= Baroque guitar =

Fretted string instrument

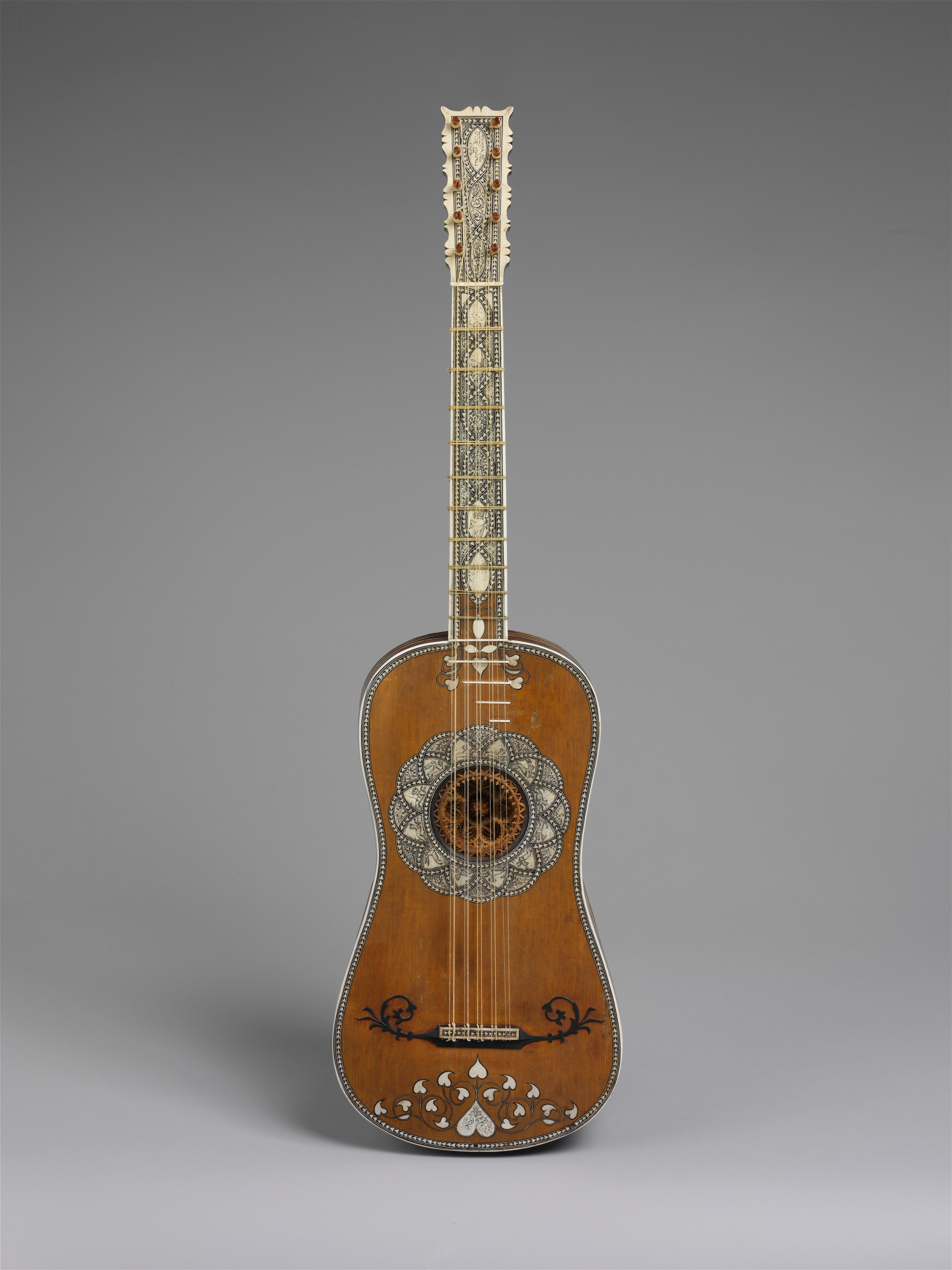
- Baroque guitar built by Matteo Sellas, c. 1630–50

String instrument
- Classification: String instrument (plucked)
- Hornbostel–Sachs classification: 321.322 (Composite chordophone)
- Developed: 17th century
- Attack: Fast

Related instruments
- List: Acoustic guitar; Classical guitar; Chitarra battente; Gittern; Lute; Parlor guitar; Romantic guitar

Musicians
- List: David Ryckaert III; Lex Eisenhardt; Eduardo Egüez; Ugo Nastrucci; Andrea Damiani; Massimo Lonardi; James Tyler; Patrick O'Brien

The Baroque guitar (c. 1600–1750) is a string instrument with five courses of gut strings and moveable gut frets. The first (highest pitched) course sometimes used only a single string.

== History ==
The earliest attestation of a five-stringed guitar comes from the mid-sixteenth-century Spanish book Declaracion de Instrumentos Musicales by Juan Bermudo, published in 1555. The first treatise published for the Baroque guitar was Guitarra Española de cinco ordenes (The Five-course Spanish Guitar), c. 1590, by Juan Carlos Amat.

The baroque guitar in contemporary ensembles took on the role of a basso continuo instrument and players would be expected to improvise a chordal accompaniment. Several scholars have assumed that the guitar was used together with another basso continuo instrument playing the bass line. However, there are good reasons to suppose that the guitar was used as an independent instrument for accompaniment in many situations. Intimately tied to the development of the Baroque guitar is the alfabeto system of notation.

== Tuning ==
Three different ways of tuning the guitar are well documented in seventeenth-century sources as set out in the following table. This includes the names of composers who are associated with each method. Few sources seem to clearly indicate that one method of stringing rather than another should be used and it is often argued that it may have been up to the player to decide what was appropriate. The matter is contentious and different theories have been proffered.

At first, commonly used tuning included courses in octaves, called a 'bordón' by the Spanish and a 'bourdon' by the French. In the end of the eighteenth century the south-French and Italians introduced guitars with five single strings, first by simply taking off the doubles (so called 'French guitar' — 'Chitarra Francese').

A very brief list of composers and tunings:

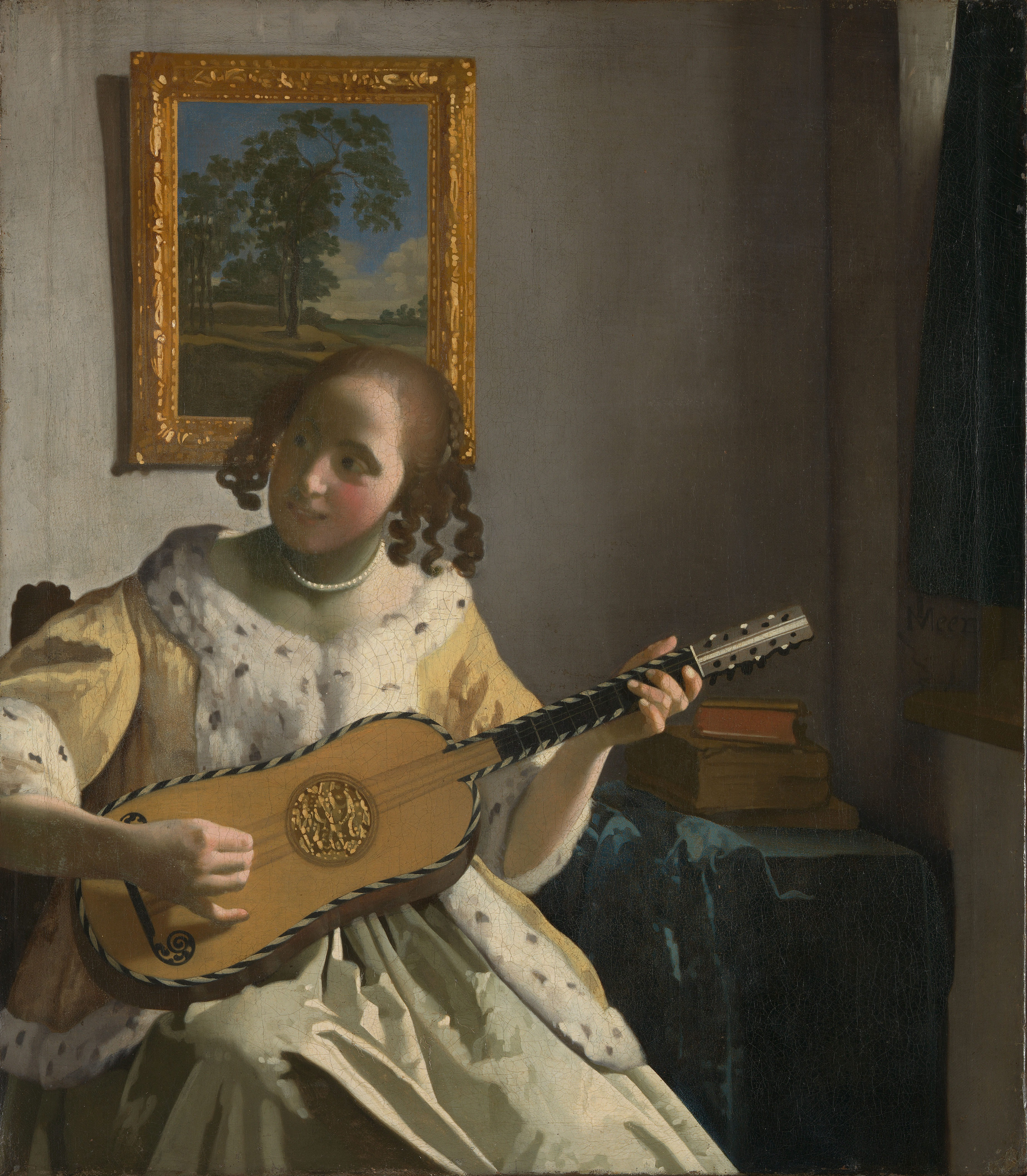
The guitar player (c. 1672), by Johannes Vermeer

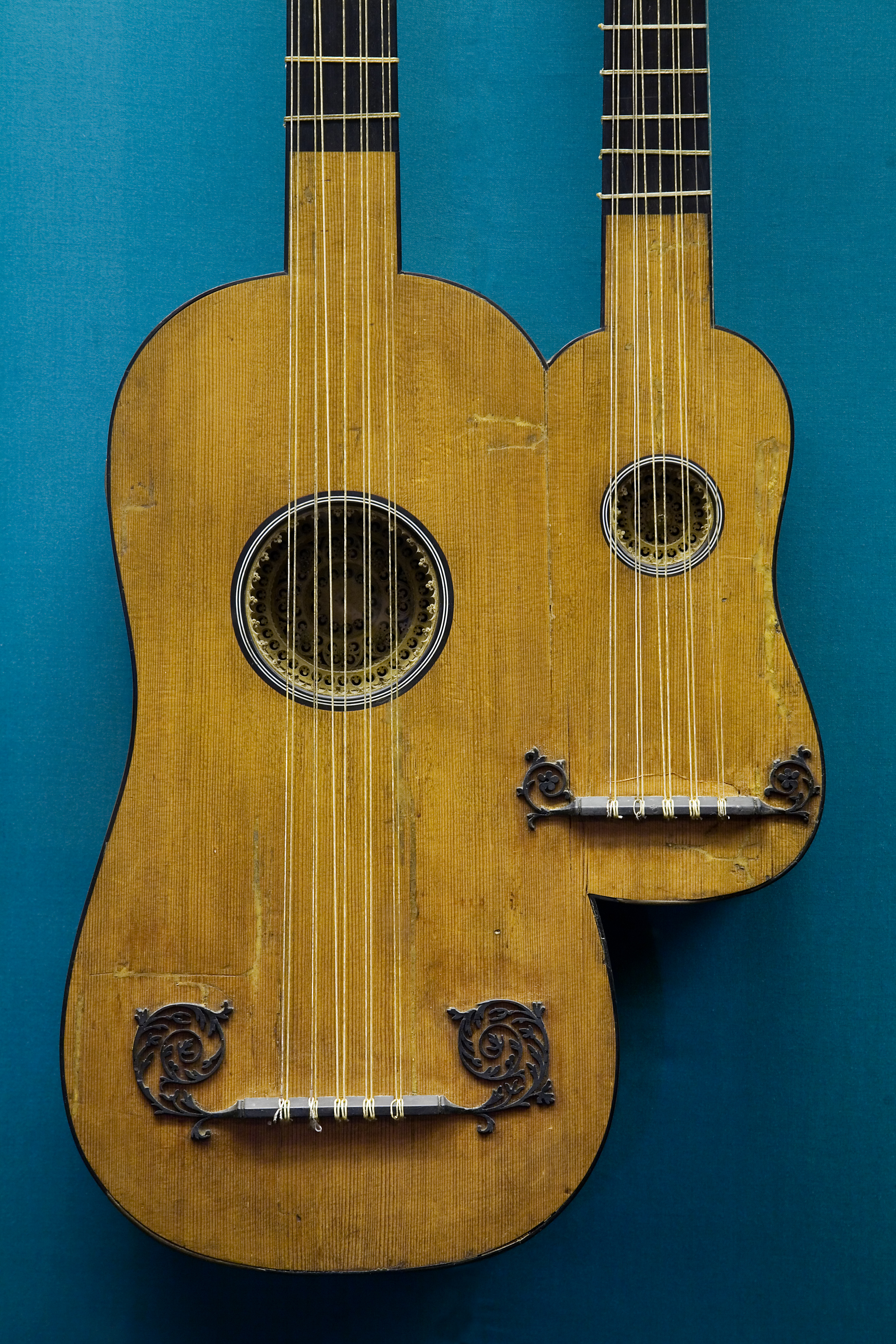
Double guitar (1690) by Alexandre Voboam, 1690 (exhibited at Kunsthistorisches Museum)

Composers	Tuning	Scale
Ferdinando Valdambrini (Italy, 1646/7); Gaspar Sanz (Spain, 1674)		e¹/e¹, b/b, g/g, d¹/d¹, a/a
Antoine Carre (France, 1671); Robert de Visée (France, 1682); Nicolas Derosier (Netherlands, 1690)		e¹/e¹, b/b, g/g, d/d¹, a/a
Girolamo Montesardo (Italy, 1606); Benedetto Sanseverino (Italy, 1620); Giovanni Paolo Foscarini (Italy, 1640); Francisco Guerau (Spain, 1694)		e¹/e¹, b/b, g/g, d/d1, A/a

== Composers ==
- Giovanni Paolo Foscarini (c. 1600 – 1650), I quattro libri della chitarra spagnola (c. 1635)
- Lodovico Monte (circa 1637)
- Francesco Corbetta (1615–1681), Varii scherzi di sonate, Libro 4 (c. 1648)
- Angelo Michele Bartolotti (c. 1615–1680)
- Giovanni Battista Granata (1620–1687)
- Gaspar Sanz (c. 1640–1710), Instrucción de música sobre la guitarra española (1674)
- Robert de Visée (c. 1658 – 1725), Livre de guittarre dédié au roy (1682) , Livre de pièces pour la guitare (c. 1686)
- Ludovico Roncalli (1654–1713), Capricci armonici sopra la chitarra spagnola (1692)
- Francisco Guerau (1649–1722), Poema harmonico (1694)
- Henri Grenerin (fl. mid-17th century)
- Santiago de Murcia (c. 1673 – 1739), Resumen de acompañar la parte con la guitarra (1714) , Cifras selectas de guitarra (1722) , Códice Saldívar No.4 (c. 1730) , and Passacalles y Obras (1732)

== Sample of makers ==
Matteo Sellas (1600s).

Antonio Stradivari (1644–1737). Of his five surviving guitars, the 1679 "Sabionari" is the only one in playable condition. Two other Stradivari guitars are in museums. An instrument of 1688 is in the Ashmolean Museum in Oxford, England, and an instrument of 1700 is in the National Music Museum in Vermillion, South Dakota.

Nicholas Alexandre Voboam II (c. 1634/46–1692/1704). French luthier with three guitars bearing his signature (from a total of 26 attributed to the Voboam Family). The guitars of Alexandre were held in high esteem during his lifetime and a century later were still considered desirable instruments.

== Performers ==
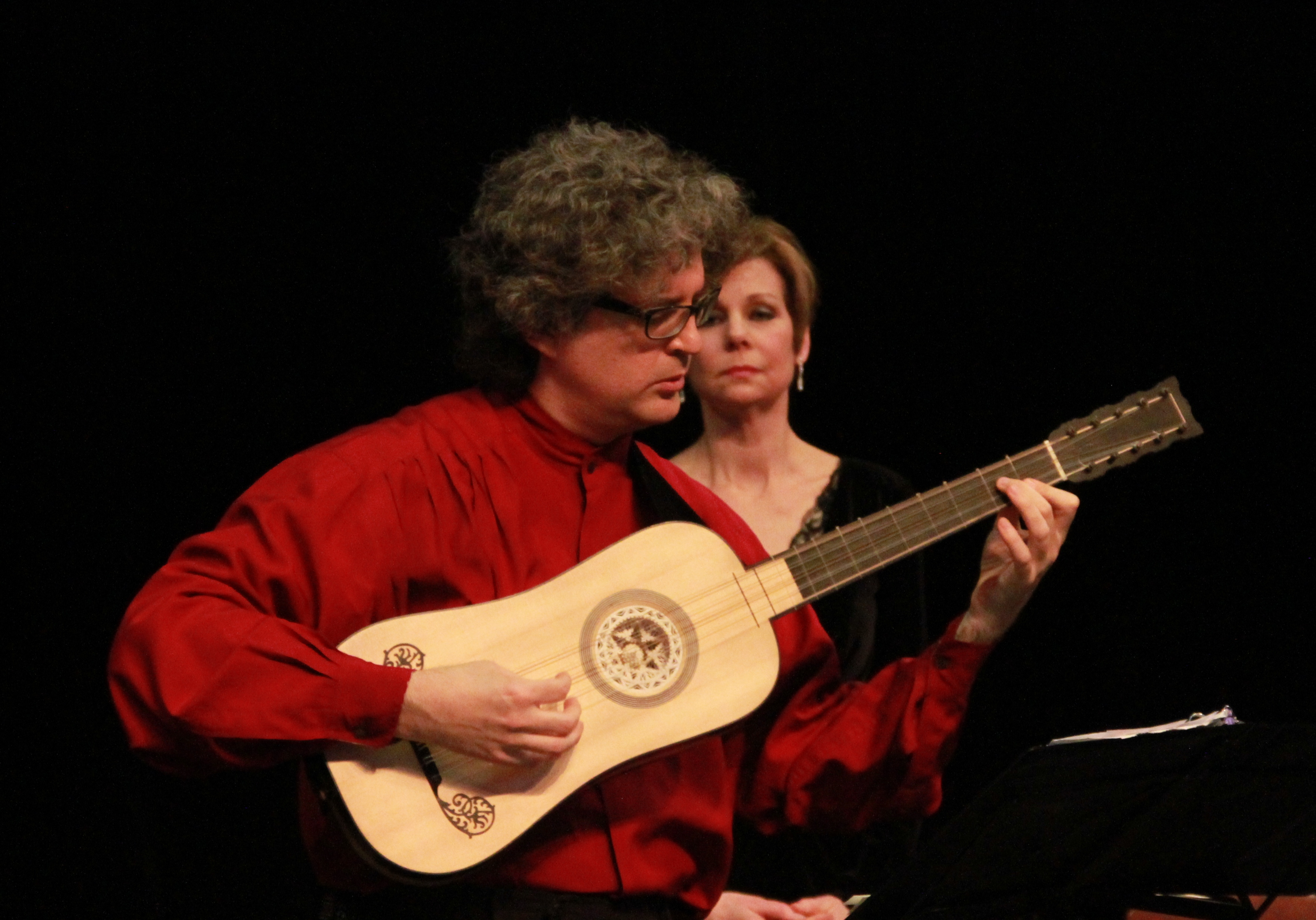
Christopher Morrongiello

- Xavier Díaz-Latorre
- Lex Eisenhardt
- Eduardo Egüez
- Rolf Lislevand
- Massimo Lonardi
- Nigel North
- Jakob Lindberg
- Barry Mason
- Ugo Nastrucci
- Patrick O'Brien
- Paul O'Dette
- Stefano Pesori
- David Ryckaert III (Antwerp 1612–1661)
- Hopkinson Smith
- Stephen Stubbs
- James Tyler

== Gallery ==
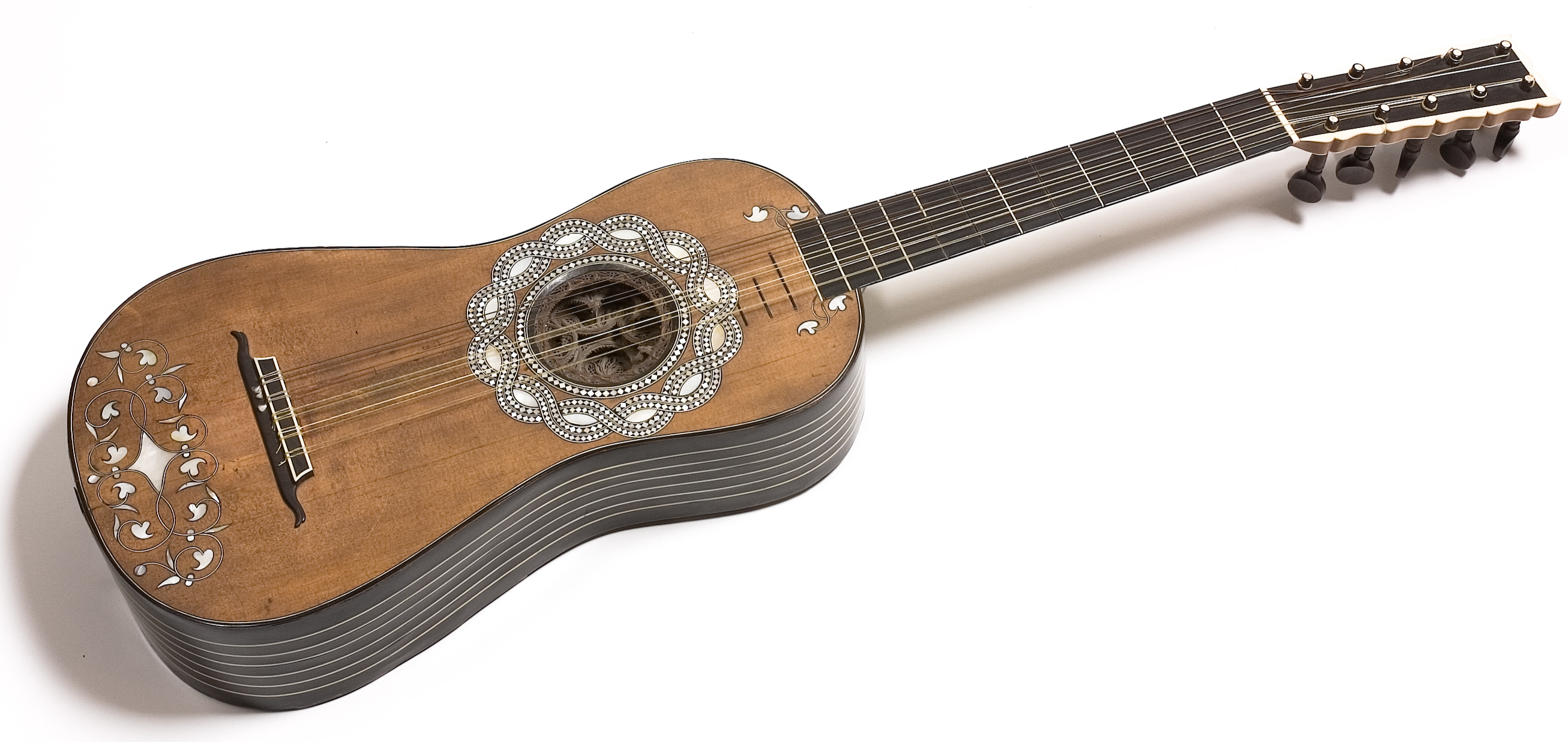
Baroque guitar by Matteo Seelos (before 1653)

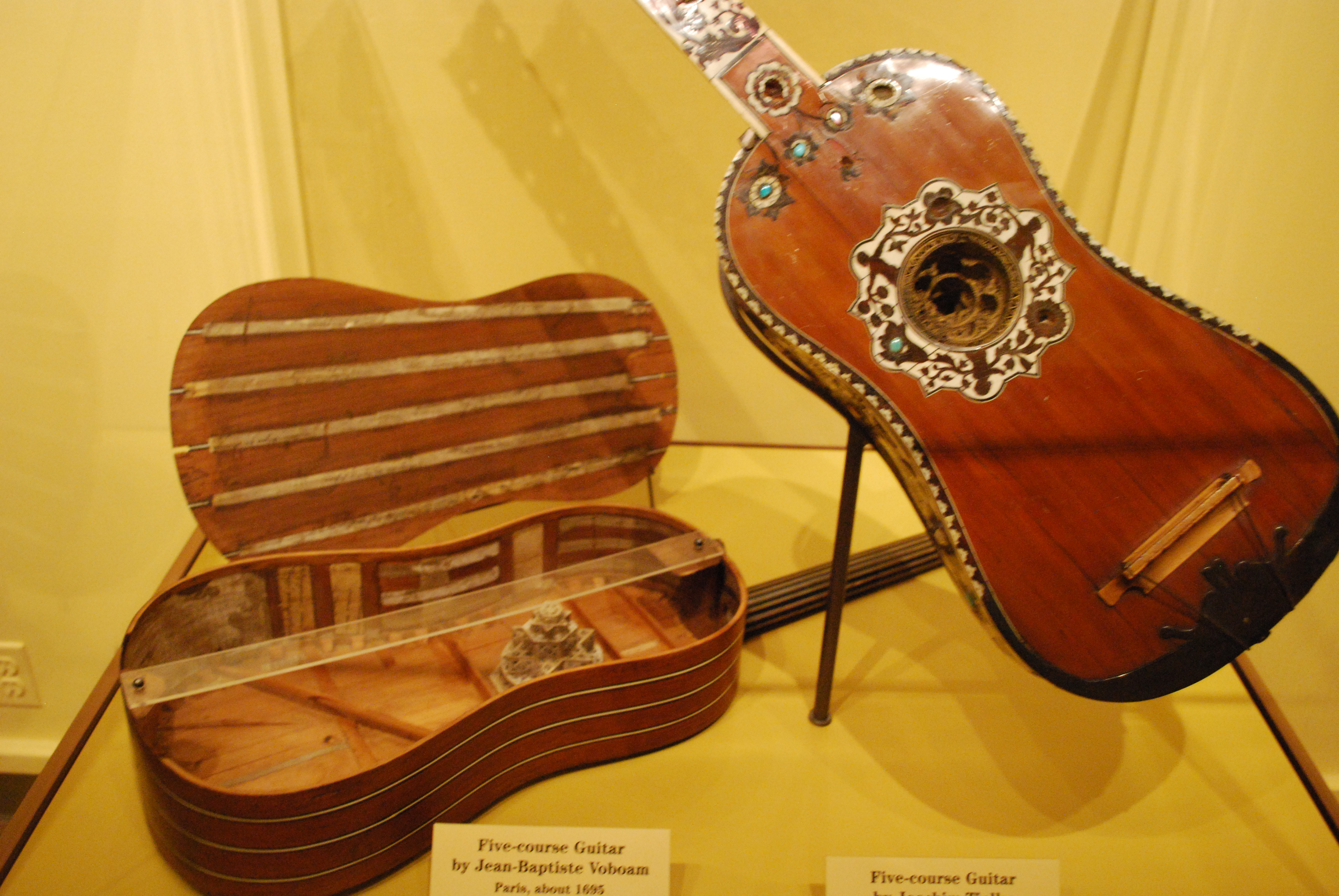
Five-course guitars by Jean-Baptiste Voboam (ca.1695) and Joachim Tielke (ca.1695–99)

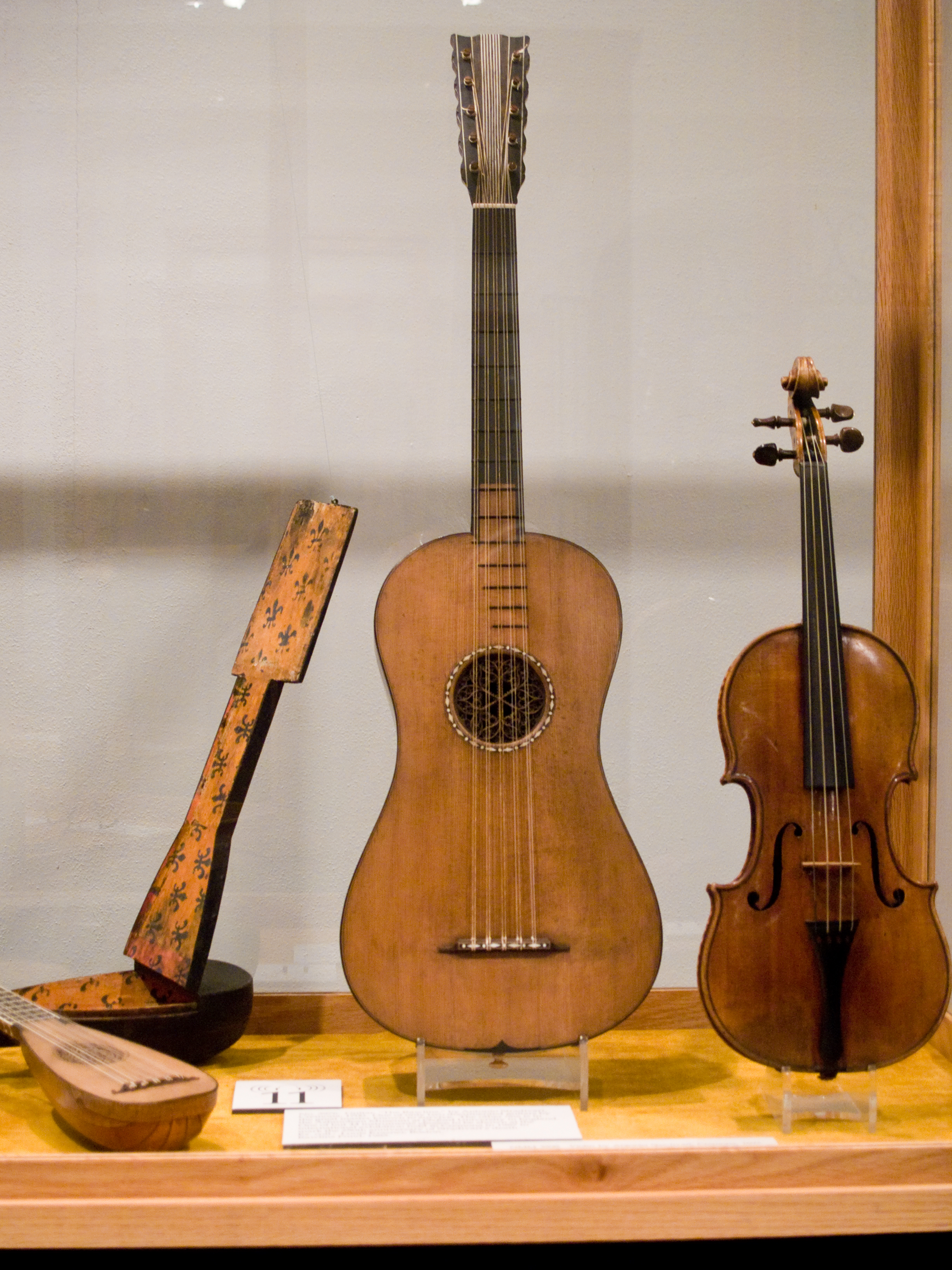
The Rawlins guitar (1700), part of the Stradivarius collection at the National Music Museum

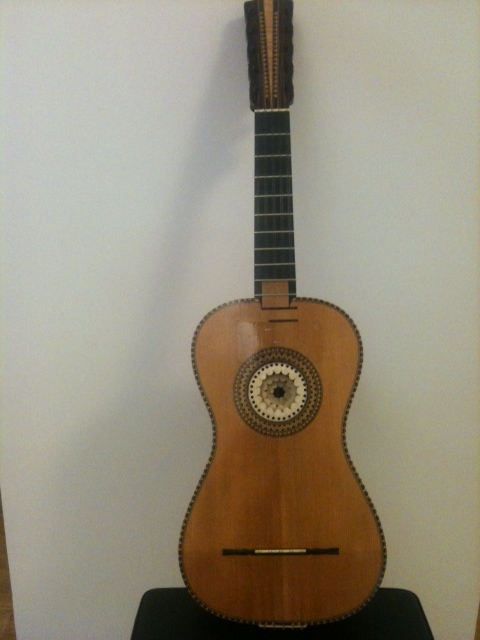
Chitarra battente

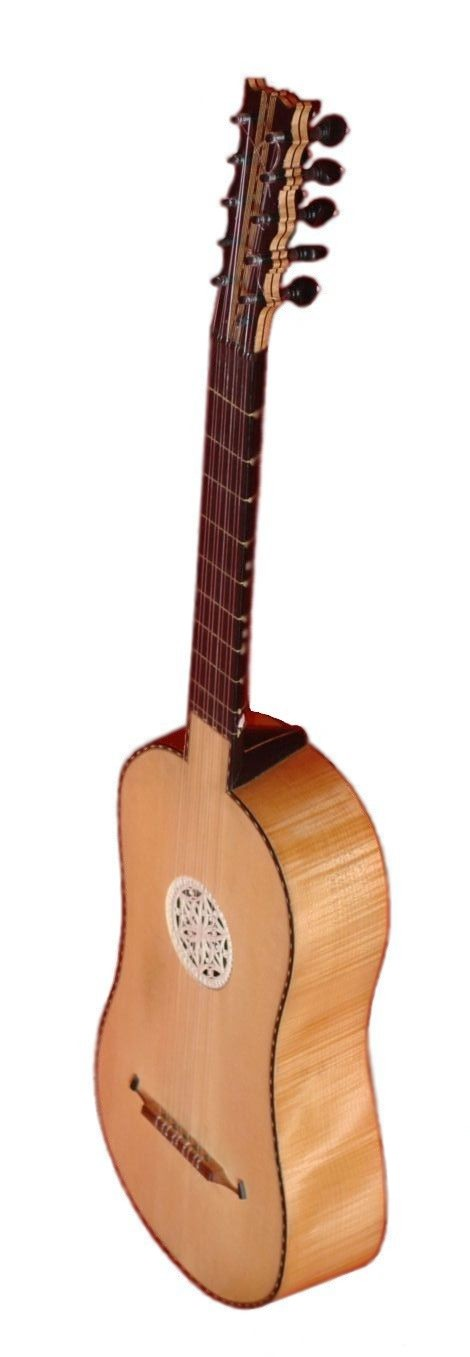
Modern copy of Baroque guitar

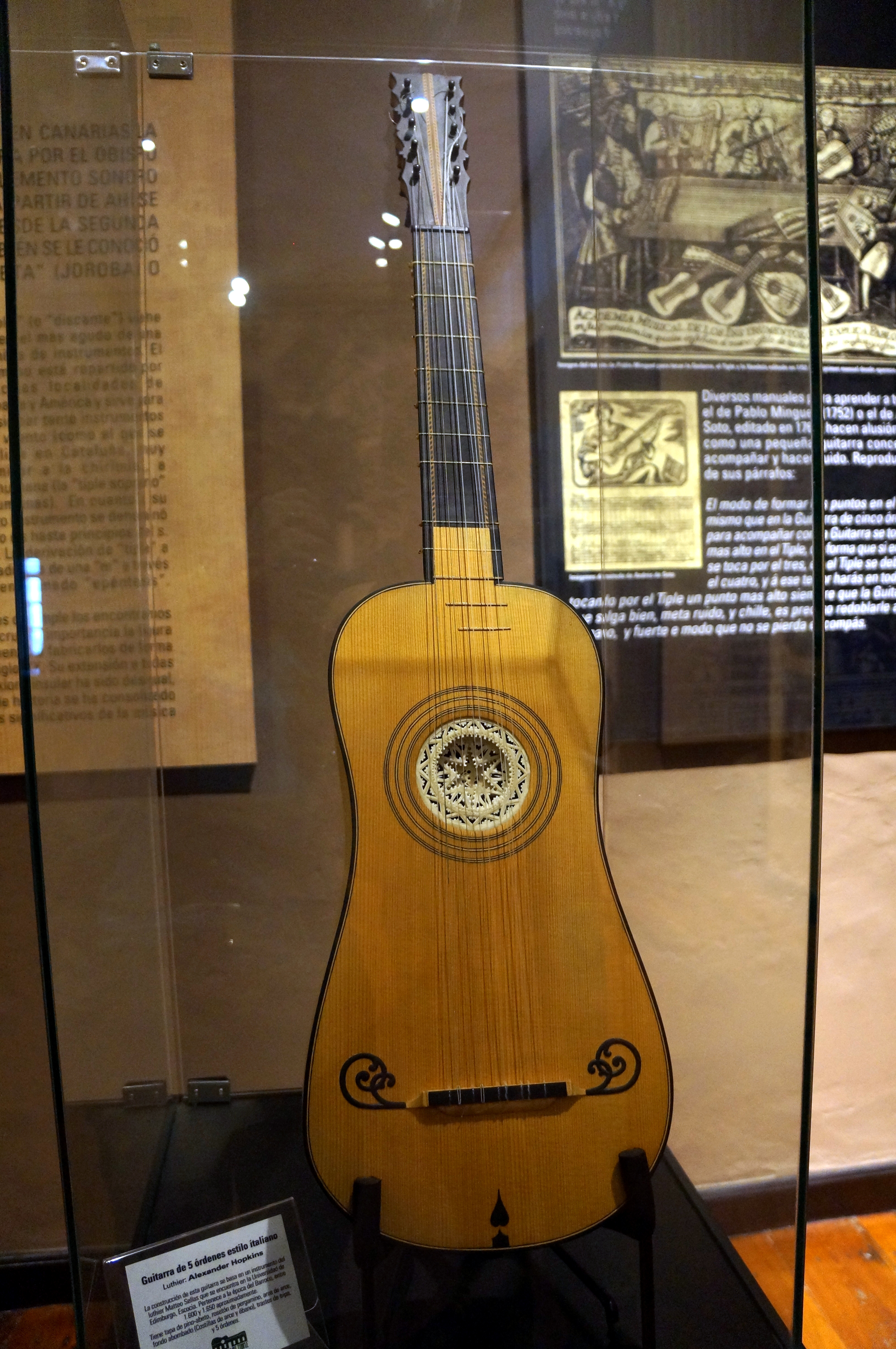
Baroque guitar at the Casa Museo Del Timple, Lanzarote, Spain.

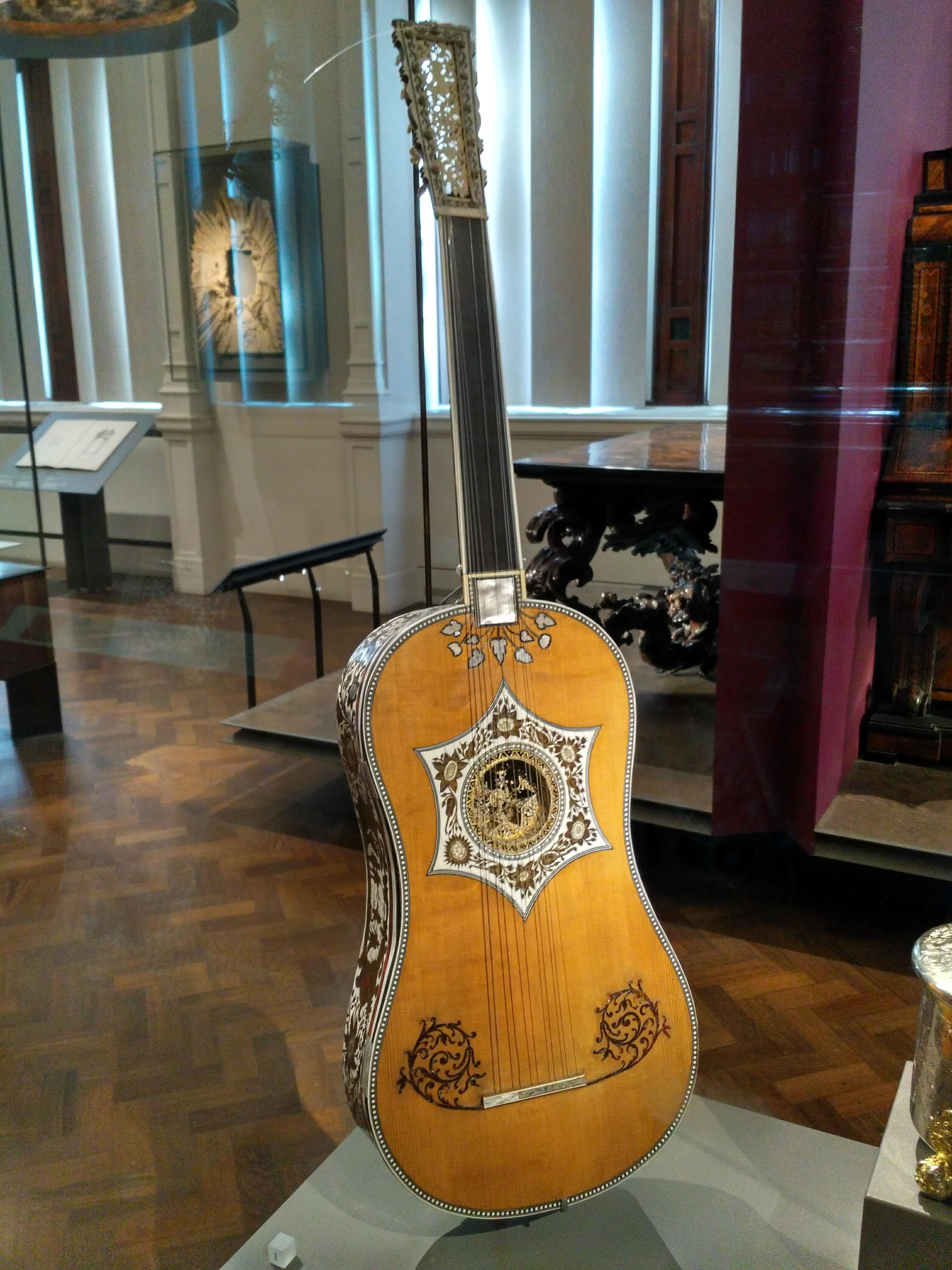
A baroque guitar by Joachim Tielke in the V&A Museum, London, UK.

== Bibliography ==
- Lex Eisenhardt, Italian Guitar Music of the Seventeenth Century, University of Rochester Press, 2015.
- Lex Eisenhardt, "Bourdons as Usual". In The Lute: The Journal of the Lute Society, vol. XLVII (2007)
- Lex Eisenhardt, "Baroque guitar accompaniment: where is the bass". In Early Music, vol. 42, No 1 (2014)
- Lex Eisenhardt, "A String of Confusion"
- James Tyler, "The Early Guitar", Oxford University Press, 1980.
- James Tyler/Paul Sparks, The Guitar and its Music", Oxford University Press, 2002.
- James Tyler, " A guide to playing the Baroque Guitar" Indiana University Press, 2011.
- Monica Hall: Baroque Guitar Stringing : a survey of the evidence (Guildford: The Lute Society, 2010) ISBN 0-905655-40-0
- Monica Hall: "Recovering a lost book of guitar music by Corbetta". In Consort: The Journal of the Dolmetsch Foundation, Vol. 61 (2005). ISSN 0268-9111
- Monica Hall: "The "Guitarra espanola" of Joan Carles Amat". In Early Music, Vol. 6, no. 3, July 1978.
- Monica Hall: "Dissonance in the guitar music of Francesco Corbetta". In Lute: The Journal of the Lute Society, Vol. XLVII (2007)
- Monica Hall: "Angiol Bartolotti's Lettere tagliate". In Lute: The Journal of the Lute Society, Vol. XLVII (2007)
- Monica Hall: "Tuning instructions for the baroque guitar in Bibliotheque Nationale Res. Vmc Ms. 59, f. 108v". In Lute: The Journal of the Lute Society, Vol. XLVII (2007)
- Antoni Pizà: Francesc Guerau i el seu temps (Palma de Mallorca: Govern de les Illes Balears, Conselleria d'Educació i Cultura, Direcció General de Cultura, Institut d'Estudis Baleàrics, 2000). ISBN 84-89868-50-6
- Hélène Charnassé, Rafael Andia, Gérard Rebours, The Guitar Books of Robert de Visée, Paris: Editions Musicales Transatlantiques, 2000, 235 pages.
- Thomas Schmitt: "Sobre la ornamentación en el repertorio para guitarra barroca en España (1600–1750)". In: Revista de Musicología, XV, nº 1, 1992
- Giovanni Accornero, Eraldo Guerci (edited and translated by Davide Rebuffa) - The Guitar: "Four Centuries of Masterpieces", (Italian/English), Edizioni Il Salabue, 2008. ISBN 978-88-87618-13-6
- Carlo Alberto Carutti, "Passioni di un collezionista", Catalogue by Giovanni Accornero (edited and translated by Davide Rebuffa), (Italian/English), Edizioni Il Salabue, 2011. ISBN 978-88-87618-15-0 (also available on CD rom)
