= Hans Gerle =

German lutenist and arranger

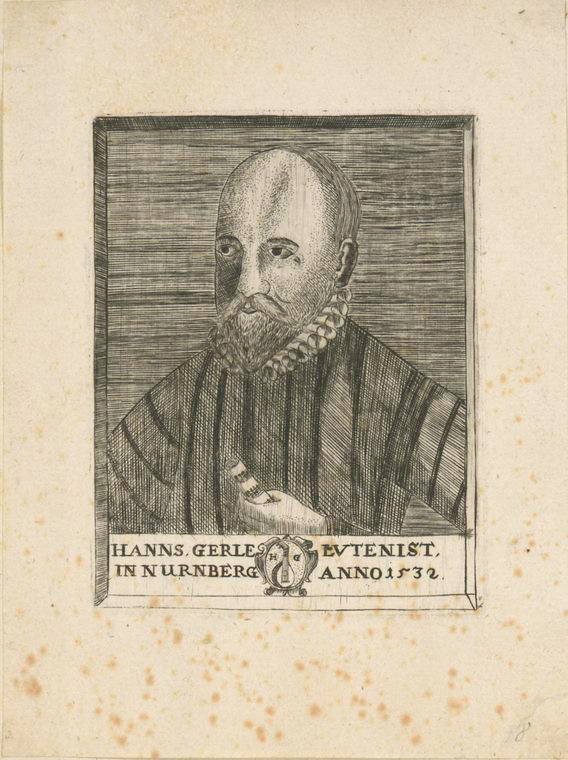
Gerle as pictured on the title page to his 1532 volume

Hans Gerle (c. 1500, Nuremberg – 1570, Nuremberg) was a German lutenist and arranger of the Renaissance. Little concrete information is available regarding Gerle's life. His father was probably Conrad Gerle (died 1521), one of the city's better-known lute makers. Gerle likely spent his entire life in Nuremberg.

== Biography ==
Gerle published three volumes of lute music through Hieronymus Formschneider, a Nuremberg publisher. The first two were issued in 1532-33, and the last in 1552; this third volume refers to Gerle as "the elder" on the title page, so it is presumed that Gerle had either a son or another relative with the same name. The first publication contains an introduction to the performance of lute, viola da gamba (Grossgeigen), and rebec (Kleingeigen), as well as an explanation of musical notation, and is a significant source of information on performance practice. The book is primarily made up of intabulations of German composers such as Ludwig Senfl, Johann Walter, Heinrich Isaac, Thomas Stoltzer, and Paul Hofhaimer.

His second volume, for solo lute, features works from many older composers, such as Hayne van Ghizeghem, Josquin des Prez, Isaac, and Jacob Obrecht, as well as popular contemporaries such as Claudin de Sermisy, Adrian Willaert, Jean Mouton, and Senfl. The third volume was a transcription into German tablature of pieces previously only available in Italian tablature, including works of Giovanni Maria da Crema, Domenico Bianchini, Simon Gintzler, Francesco Canova da Milano, Pietro Paolo Borrono, and Alberto da Ripa.

== Publications ==
- Musica teusch, auf die Instrument der grossen unnd kleinen Geygen, auch Lautten (1532)
- Tabulatur auff die Laudten (1533)
- Eyn newes sehr künstlichs Lautenbuch (1552)
