= Rafael Andia =

French classical guitarist

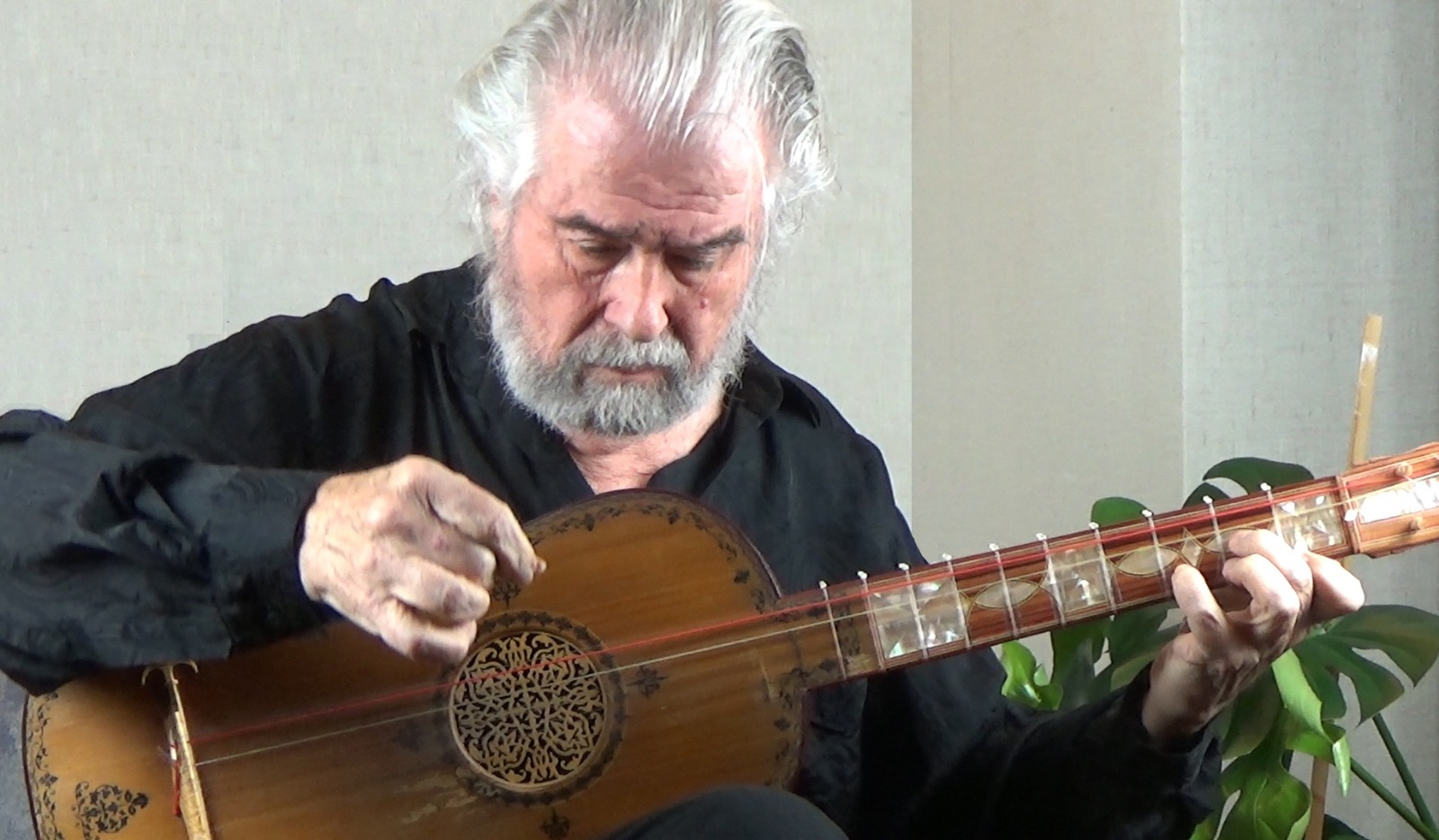
- Guitarist Rafael Andia playing a baroque guitar.

Background information
- Born: November 30, 1942 (age 82)
- Instruments: Guitar; Classical guitar; Baroque guitar
- Website: www.rafaelandia.com

Rafael Andia (born November 30, 1942) is a French classical guitarist.

== Biography ==
Born in France of Spanish Republican parents, Rafael Andia first studied the violin but was attracted by the musical tradition of his family. The flamenco that he then practiced yielded to the classical guitar, but his conception of the instrument remains durably fixed under that first influence.

Rafael Andia will remain a cornerstone for his generation because of a quite complete guitaristic activity. His reputation is as important in the field of contemporary music - where he has premiered some of the more significant works of our times - as it is in the field of ancient music, where he has widely contributed to the renewal of baroque guitar, particularly through the complete work of Robert de Visée. His contribution also extends to the field of Spanish guitar, by making popular many techniques for that instrument as a teacher of classical and baroque guitar at École Normale de Musique de Paris, where he has been teaching since 1971.

Composer and editorial director, he brings regularly his contribution to the ancient, classical or contemporary repertoire.

== Works ==
=== Records ===
- 1974 Les Classiques de la Guitare: Padre Soler, Sousa Carvalho, Domenico Scarlatti, Enrique Granados, Joaquín Turina, Emilio Pujol, Manuel de Falla. Chorus 19733
- 1979 Masterpieces of French museums: Gaspar Sanz, Francisco Guerau, on original 17th-century instruments. Densité 7
- 1984 François Lecocq (1729): works for baroque guitar. (discographic premiere). MW 80045 (GHA 126.062) re-published 2009
- 1985 Villa Lobos: The five Préludes and André Jolivet: complete works for solo guitar (discographic premiere). Lyrinx 034
- 1986 Robert de Visée (1682/1686): complete works for baroque guitar (discographic premiere). Harmonia Mundi, box 118688, CD 901186
- 1990 “Guitar”: Murail, Taïra, Reverdy, Drogoz, Ballif (discographic premiere). Adda / Musidisc CD 590019
- 1999 Joaquin Turina: transcriptions and complete works for solo guitar (discographic premiere) Harmonia Mundi CD HMC 905246
- 2002 Isaac Albéniz: works for solo guitar (discographic premiere) Mandala CD Man 5030
- 2006 Manuel de Falla: Complete Amor Brujo and other works for solo guitar (discographic premiere) Mandala CD 5112
- 2013 Inmemorial - Ouvres pour Guitare avec Claire Sananikone Compositions by Rafael Andia Solstice SOCD 295

=== Premieres ===
- solo guitar
  - Claude Ballif: Solfeggietto no 6, op. 36
  - Graciane Finzi: Non se muove una foglia
  - André Jolivet: Tombeau de Robert de Visée
  - Tristan Murail: Tellur
  - José-Luis Narvaez: Vision Clasica del Flamenco
  - Michèle Reverdy: Triade
  - Henri Sauguet: Musiques pour Claudel
  - Yoshihisa Taïra: Monodrame III
- others
  - Claude Ballif: Poème de la Félicité, for three female voices, perc. and guitar dir. Yves Prin, Radio- France 1979
  - Bruno Ducol: Des Scènes d’Enfants, with Renaud François, flute, Radio-France 1984
  - Christiane Le Bordays: Concerto de Azul, guitar and orchestra, Orchestre de Nice-Côte d’Azur, dir. Pol Mule, Radio-France 1976
  - Tod Machover: Déplacements, for amplified guitar and computer-generated tape, Festival de la Jeune Musique, Varsovia 1984 (premiere for Europe)
  - Philippe Manoury: Musique, for two harps, two perc., mandoline and guitar, dir.Guy Reibel, Radio-France 1986
  - Yoshihisa Taïra: Pénombres I et II, (version for one guitar and twelve strings), Ensemble Ars Nova, dir. Philippe Nahon, Maison de la Culture de La Rochelle 1988
  - Jean-Jacques Werner: Duo Concertant, with Francis Pierre, harp, Radio-France 1977

=== Literature ===
- Literary and scientific publications
  - 1969: Calibration of an Ebert-Fastie spectrometer, Thesis at the University of Paris VI
  - 1970: "Infrared Absorption Spectrum of Methane from 2884 to 3141 cm-1", L. Henry, N. Husson R. Andia and A. Valentin, Journal of Molecular Spectroscopy 36, 511-520 (1970)
  - 1978: Les Goûts Réunis: La Guitare Baroque, Paris,
  - 1981: The Guide of the Guitar, Paris, Mazarine editions, for the articles “the Repertory of the Guitar” and “Flamenco”
  - 1999: Robert de Visée, the two books for guitar (1682–1686), Paris, Éditions musicales transatlantiques, in collaboration with Helene Charnassé and Gerard Rebours
  - 2000: Francisco Tárrega, the collected guitar works, Heidelberg, Chanterelle verlag, foreword of the two volumes.
  - 2015 : Libertés et déterminismes de la guitare, essay, Paris, L'Harmattan.
  - 2016 : Labyrinthes d'un guitariste, témoignage, Paris, L'Harmattan.
  - 2018 : Rasgueados, novel, Paris, L'Harmattan.
  - 2019 : Guitarre Royalle, novel, Paris, L'Harmattan.

=== Collections ===
- La Guitare contemporaine, collection Rafael Andia
  - Claude Ballif, Solfeggietto op. 36
  - Leo Brouwer, El Decameron Negro
  - Stephen Dembski, Sunwood
  - Philippe Drogoz, Prélude à la mise à mort
  - Philippe Drogoz, Voyage pour une guitare
  - Arnaud Dumond, 5 Haïkus Atonaux
  - Félix Ibarrondo, Cristal y Piedra
  - André Jolivet, Le Tombeau de Robert de Visée
  - Aram Katchaturian, Prélude for guitar
  - Edith Lejet, Balance
  - Tod Machover, Déplacements
  - Georges Migot, Pour un hommage à Claude Debussy
  - Tristan Murail, Tellur
  - Yves-Marie Pasquet, Les Oiseaux du regard
  - Michèle Reverdy, Triade
  - Jeannine Richer, Piège VI
  - Anne Sédès, Pièce n° 1
  - Yoshihisa Taïra, Monodrame III
  - Alain Weber, Quasi Sonatina
- Guitarra Ibérica, collection Rafael Andia
  - Rafael Andia,
    - Canciones Flamencas Antiguas for two guitars
    - Improvisación al Estudio de Cano
    - Impulsivo
    - Flamenco Miniatura, 8 pieces for beginners
  - Miguel Castaños
    - Flamenco de base
  - Williams Montesinos
    - Imágenes para Aguirre
  - José-Luis Narvaez
    - Cerro de la Luna
    - Rumba
    - Sonata Flamenca for two guitars
    - Visión Clásica del Flamenco
  - Joaquín Turina
    - Cinq Danses Gitanes, op. 55 for guitar
    - Tango, op 8 n°2 for guitar
  - Narciso Yepes
    - Jeux Interdits for four guitars
