= Eugen Dombois =

Eugen Müller-Dombois
- Born: 15 November 1931; Bethel, Germany
- Died: 9 May 2014 (aged 82) near Basel, Switzerland
- Education: Musikhochschule Köln
- Occupations: Lutenist, music teacher
- Known for: Pioneer of the lute revival; professor at Schola Cantorum Basiliensis
- Children: 1 daughter
- Parent(s): Georg Müller (father); Johanna Dombois (mother)

Eugen Müller-Dombois (15 November 1931 – 9 May 2014) was a German lutenist and music teacher. He was a pioneer in the revival of the lute and early music revival.

== Biography ==
He was born in Bethel, Germany, on 15 November 1931 to Georg Müller, a well-known educator and Johanna Dombois. He was the second of four brothers and two sisters (both of whom died in childhood). After training as a secondary school teacher (German, music), he studied lute and guitar with Walter Gerwig at Musikhochschule Köln in Cologne from 1955 to 1958. Subsequently, he became a lecturer at the Northwest German Music Academy Detmold Hochschule für Musik Detmold and began at the same time a successful international career as a concert artist. He had a solo career as well as playing in ensembles such as the Leonhardt Consort directed by Gustav Leonhardt and Concentus Musicus of Vienna directed by Nikolaus Harnoncourt.

== Career ==
An impairment of his arm (neurotmesis of the nerve in his right arm) forced him to give up his concert career in 1977. In 1962 he was appointed by Paul Sacher to the Schola Cantorum Basiliensis and taught there until his retirement in 1996. Along with German lutenists Michael Schäffer (lutenist) and Walter Gerwig, many of the top lutenists from the 1970s to the present studied with him at the Schola.

He died 9 May 2014 near Basel, Switzerland. He left a wife and a daughter.

His students include Toyohiko Satoh, Manuel Morais, Hopkinson Smith, Robert Strizich, Catherine Liddel, Jürgen Hübscher, Paul O'Dette, Rolf Lislevand, Karl-Ernst Schröder, Robert Barto, Joachim Held, Peter Croton, Christina Pluhar, Anthony Bailes, Brian Feehan, Ray Nurse, Andreas Martin, Donna Curry inter alia.

== Discography ==
- "Lachrimae Or Seaven Teares" – RCA Victrola 1968
- Lautenmusik Der Renaissance" – Electrola 1970
- Ludwig Senfl – Wally Staempfli, Kurt Huber Und Fritz Näf, Eugen M. Dombois, Ricercare-Ensemble Für Alte Musik, Zürich, Michel Piguet – Deutsche Lieder, Die Stimme Seines Herrn 1972
- Weiss* / Kellner* / Bach* – Die BarockLaute I / The Baroque Lute I / Le Luth Baroque I, Philips 1973
- Bach* / Conradi* / Weiss* – The Baroque Lute II / Die Barocklaute II / Le Luth Baroque II Philips 1973
- Weiss* / Kellner* / Bach* / Conradi* – Die Barocklaute I und II / The Baroque Lute I and II / Le Luth Baroque I et II RCA Red Seal RL 30385 1980
- David Kellner, Johann Sebastian Bach, Johann Gottfried Conradi, Sylvius Leopold Weiss, – The Baroque Lute – (CD) Seon SBK 60372 1998
- Eugen M. Dombois – Music For Maximlian: Sounds Of The Renaissance Court Of The Holy Roman Empire
- Johannes Brenneke, Eugen Müller-Dombois*, Fritz Wunderlich, Theo Altmeyer, RIAS Chamber Choir* – Music For Maximlian: Sounds Of The Renaissance Court Of The Holy Roman Empire (LP) Angel Records S-36379
