= Lex (given name) =

Lex is a given name. It can refer to a shortened version of Alexander or Alexis.

== People with the name ==
- Lex Albrecht (born 1987), Canadian racing cyclist
- Lex de Azevedo (born 1943), American composer, songwriter, pianist
- Lex Baillie (born 1966), Scottish professional footballer
- Lex Banning (1921–1965), Australian lyric poet
- Lex Barker (1919–1973), American actor
- Lex Bell OAM (born 1945), Australian politician
- Lex Bos (born 1957), field hockey goalkeeper from the Netherlands
- Lex Brown (artist) (born 1989), American video and performance artist
- Lex Brown (businessman), Scottish businessman
- Lex Cazemier (born 1958), Dutch speed skater
- Lex Chisholm (1915–1981), Canadian ice hockey centre
- Lex Cools (1941–2013), Dutch behavioral pharmacologist
- Lex van Dam (born 1968), Dutch investment manager, investor, writer
- Lex Scott Davis (born 1991), American actress
- Lex Davison (1923–1965), Australian racing driver
- Lex van Delden (1919–1988), Dutch composer
- Lex van Delden (actor) (1947–2010), Dutch actor and singer
- Lex Delles (born 1984), Luxembourgish politician
- Lex Doyle AO, Australian paediatrician, researcher and academic
- Lex Dwyer, former Australian rules footballer
- Lex van der Eb (born 1934), Dutch molecular biologist and virologist
- Lex Eisenhardt (born 1952), performer on early plucked instruments
- Lex Fair (1926–1995), Dean of Connor from 1990 until 1995
- Lex Franken (born 1916), Dutch Olympic water polo player
- Lex Fridman (born 1983), Russian-American computer scientist
- Lex Frieden (born 1949), American disability activist and professor
- Lex Gibb, Australian professional soccer player
- Lex Gigeroff (1962–2011), Canadian television writer, actor, co-creator of the science fiction series Lexx
- Lex Gillette (born 1984), US blind Paralympic athlete competing in T11 and F11
- Lex Gold CBE (born 1940), Scottish administrator and former footballer
- Lex Goudsmit (1913–1999), Dutch actor
- Lex Govan (1914–1996), Scottish rugby union player
- Lex Grant (born 1962), Scottish football forward
- Lex Greensill (born 1976), Australian businessman, founded Greensill Capital
- Lex Green (Florida politician) (Robert A. Green) (1892–1973), U.S. Representative from Florida
- Lex de Haan (1954–2006), author, lecturer, researcher, and consultant in relational database technology
- Lex van Haeften (born 1987), Dutch professional footballer
- Lex Hester (1935–2000), public administrator in Jacksonville, Florida
- Lex Hilliard (born 1984), American football running back and fullback
- Lex Hixon (1941–1995), American Sufi author, poet, and spiritual teacher
- Lex Hudson (born 1955), Canadian professional ice hockey player
- Lex Humphries (1936–1994), jazz drummer
- Lex Immers (born 1986), Dutch professional footballer
- Lex Jacoby (1930–2015), Luxembourgian writer
- Lex Johnson, British designer, director and creative executive
- Lex van Kreuningen (born 1937), Dutch road cyclist between 1959 and 1964
- Lex Lang (born 1965), American voice actor
- Lex Lasry (born 1948), Australian lawyer and a judge on the Supreme Court of Victoria
- Lex Law, Scottish former footballer
- Lex Luger (born 1958), ring name of American professional wrestler Lawrence Pfohl
- Lex Luger (record producer) (born 1991), American record producer
- Lex Lutzus (born 1980), British film producer and financier
- Lex MacKenzie, MC (1885–1970), Canadian politician
- Lex Marinos (1949–2024), Australian actor
- Lex McLean (1908–1975), Scottish comedian
- Lex Medlin (born 1969), American actor
- Alexander "Lex" Miller (1908–1960), New Zealand Presbyterian minister, author, theologian
- Lex Mpati SC (born 1949), South African judge, Chancellor of Rhodes University
- Lex Mullink (born 1944), Dutch Olympic rower
- Lex Nederlof (born 1966), retired Dutch cyclist
- Lex Peterson (1957–2004), New Zealand bobsledder
- Lex Pritchard (born 1954), Australian rules footballer
- Lex Redelé (1939–2013), Dutch rower
- Lex Richardson (born 1958), Scottish professional football player and manager
- Lex Rijger (1944–2021), Surinamese country singer and songwriter
- Lex Robson (1898–1974), Scottish-Canadian professional golfer
- Lex Schoenmaker (born 1947), Dutch former football player and manager
- Lex Schrijver (born 1948), Dutch mathematician and computer scientist
- Lex Shrapnel (born 1979), English actor
- Lex Staley, half of the syndicated American radio morning team Lex and Terry
- Lex Stone (1885–1925), American football player, coach, politician
- Lex Thompson (1911–1954), owner of the National Football League's Philadelphia Eagles
- Lex Tupas, Filipino public servant
- Lex van den Berghe, contestant in the 2001 American television show Survivor: Africa
- Lex Veldhuis (born 1983), Dutch professional poker player
- Alexander "Lex" Watson, AM (1943–2014), Australian LGBT rights activist, historian, political scientist

== Fictional characters ==
- Lex Luthor, nemesis of Superman
- Alexis "Lex" Murphy, in the Jurassic Park novel and film franchise
- Lex "Mechoneko" Winsmore, in the webtoon series Live with Yourself! (2017–2024)
- Lex, in the New Zealand / British TV series The Tribe (1999–2003), played by Caleb Ross
- Lex, in the game Fire Emblem: Genealogy of the Holy War (1996)

== See also ==
- Lexx, a science fiction TV series and a spaceship/weapon in the series
- LEXX (text editor)
- Mr. Lexx, Jamaican dancehall artist Christopher Palmer (born 1974)
