= Andreas Martin (lutenist) =

- Born: 1963 (age 61–62); Frankfurt am Main, Germany
- Genres: Classical; early music
- Occupation: Lutenist
- Instruments: Lute; guitar

Andreas Martin (born 1963) is a German lutenist.

== Life ==
Born in Frankfurt am Main, Germany, he studied guitar with Mario Sicca (Musikhochschule Stuttgart) and Ruggero Chiesa (Conservatorio di Musica Giuseppe Verdi), as well as Anglo–Saxon and Roman Languages and Philosophy at the University of Heidelberg.

At the Schola Cantorum in Basel, he worked under the tutelage of lutenists Eugen Dombois, Hopkinson Smith, and Peter Croton.

He has given performances on German and British television and performs at numerous festivals. Andreas Martin's 2004 recording of Bach received substantial international praise and recognition.
