= Buquet =

Buquet is a French surname. Notable people with the surname include:

- Gérard Buquet (born 1954), French musician.
- Jean Baptiste Lucien Buquet (1807–1889), French entomologist.
- Marcelo Buquet (born 1963), Uruguayan actor and former model.
- Ruddy Buquet (born 1977), French football referee.
