= Ugo Nastrucci =

Italian composer, theorbist, and lutenist

Ugo Nastrucci (born 14 December 1953 in Milan, Italy) is a lutenist, theorbist, and composer.

He studied composition with Irlando Danieli and Giacomo Manzoni at the Conservatorio "G.Verdi" in Milan. He studied lute with Massimo Lonardi, Paolo Chierici and Hopkinson Smith and conducting with Simone Fontanelli.

He was a founding member of many ensembles of Early Music, notably Ens. "Pian E Forte" and collaborated with such ensembles as "Il Conserto Vago", "Lo Scrigno d’Orfeo", "Europa Galante", "Ensemble Arte-Musica", "Capella Leopoldina", ’”Alessandro Stradella Consort", 'Ensemble “Zefiro”, “I Barocchisti” and "Accademia del Ricercare".

== Compositions ==
He is the author of much incidental music for theatrical productions, orchestral, chamber and choral works, and serves as a professor of composition at the Istituto Superiore di Studi Musicali "Vittadini" in Pavia, Italy.
