= Rolf Lislevand =

- Born: 30 December 1961 (age 63); Oslo
- Origin: Norway
- Genres: Contemporary and classical music
- Occupation: Musician
- Instrument(s): Lute, vihuela, baroque guitar, theorbo
- Website: player.ecmrecords.com/lislevand

Rolf Lislevand (30 December 1961), is a Norwegian performer of Early music specialising on lute, vihuela, baroque guitar and theorbo.

== Biography ==
Lislevand was born in Oslo. From 1980 to 1984, he studied classical guitar at the Norwegian Academy of Music. In 1984 he entered the Schola Cantorum Basiliensis in Switzerland, under the tutelage of lutenists Hopkinson Smith and Eugen Dombois up to 1987 when he moved to Italy. From 1990 he was a teacher at the conservatory in Toulouse, France, from 1993 professor at the Music Academy in the German town of Trossingen.

Since his first album as main artist with works from the "Libro Quarto d'intavolatura di Chitarrone" by composer Hieronymus Kapsberger, he had gained various awards: Diapason d’Or, Choc du Monde de la Musique, 10 de Répertoire, etc.

In 1991 he played as part of the sound-track to the French film Tous les Matins du Monde together with the viol player Jordi Savall, with whom he has had an extensive collaboration.

Lislevand's son André Lislevand plays the viola da gamba.

== Honors ==
- 1994: The French Diapason d'Or de l'Année 1994
- 1994: Best Record of Music before 1650 / Cannes classical award
- 1995: Critic's choice at Gramophone
- 2001: Spellemannprisen in the category Classical music for the album Alfabeto
- 2004: Kritikerprisen, Norwegian Critics Award
- 2015: Spellemannprisen in the category Classical music for the album Scaramanzia

== Discography (in selection) ==
=== Solo albums ===
- 1993: Johannes Hieronymus Kapsberger - Libro Quarto D'Intavolatura Di Chitarone (Astrée Auvidis)
- 1996: Antonio Vivaldi - L'Oeuvre Complet Pour Luth - The Complete Works For Lute (Astrée Auvidis)
- 1997: Gaspar Sanz / Antonio de Santa Cruz - Encuentro (Astrée Naïve)
- 2000: Santiago de Murcia Codex (Astrée Auvidis), with Ensemble Kapsberger
- 2000: Johann Sebastian Bach - Intavolatura (Astrée Naïve)
- 2001: Giovanni Paolo Foscarini - Alphabeto (Astrée Naïve), with Ensemble Kapsberger
- 2003: La Belle Homicide (Astrée Naïve)
- 2005: Jul I Gammel Tid (Kirkelig Kulturverksted)
- 2006: Nuove Musiche (ECM New Series)
- 2006: Antonio Vivaldi - Musica Per Mandolino E Liuto (Naïve)
- 2009: Diminuito (ECM New Series, Universal Music Classical)
- 2015: Scaramanzia (Naïve)
- 2015: Tourdion (Inner Ear), with Bjergsted Jazz Ensemble
- 2016: La Mascarade (ECM New Series)
- 2025: Libro primo (ECM New Series)

=== Collaborations ===
- 1991: Claudio Monteverdi - Arie E Lamenti (Astrée Auvidis), with Montserrat Figueras, Ton Koopman, and Andrew Lawrence-King
- 1993: Tarquinio Merula - Arie E Lamenti (Astrée Auvidis), with Montserrat Figueras, Jean-Pierre Canihac, Ton Koopman, Andrew Lawrence-King, Lorenz Duftschmid, and Jordi Savall
- 1998: Corelli / Marais / Martin Y. Coll / Ortiz & Anónimos - La Folia (1490-1701) (Alia Vox), with Jordi Savall, Michael Behringer, Arianna Savall, Bruno Cocset, Pedro Estevan, and Adela González-Campa
- 2003: José Marín - Tonos Humanos (Alia Vox), with Montserrat Figueras, Arianna Savall, Pedro Estevan, Adela González-Camp
- 2003: Marin Marais - Pièces De Viole Du Second Livre, 1701 - Hommage À Mons.r De Lully Et Mons.r De Sainte Colombe (Alia Vox), with Jordi Savall, Pierre Hantaï, Xavier Diaz-Latorre, Philippe Pierlot
- 2003: Monsieur de Sainte Colombe le Fils / Marin Marais - Tonos Humanos (Alia Vox), with Jordi Savall, Pierre Hantaï, Xavier Díaz-Latorre, Philippe Pierlot, Jean-Pierre Marielle, and Le Parnasse De La Viole (3xCD)
- 2005: Luigi Boccherini - Fandango, Sinfonie & La Musica Notturna Di Madrid (Alia Vox), with Le Concert Des Nations, Jordi Savall, Bruno Cocset, Manfredo Kraemer, Pablo Valetti, and José De Udaeta
- 2005: Altre Follie (1500 - 1750) (Alia Vox), with Hespèrion XXI, Jordi Savall, Manfredo Kraemer, Michael Behringer, Mauro Lopes, and Arianna Savall
- 2009: Boccherini, Haydn - Boccherini: Fandango (Guitar Quintet No.4 In D / La Musica Notturna Di Madrid) - Haydn: String Quartets Opp. 3/5 & 74/3 (Sony Classical), with Carmina Quartet and Nina Corti

Awards
| Preceded by Erlend Skomsvoll/Christian Ihle Hadland | Recipient of the classical music Spellemannprisen; 2015 | Succeeded by Trondheim Soloists |
