= Massimo Lonardi =

Italian lutenist (born 1953)

Massimo Lonardi (born Milan, 1953) is an Italian lutenist who actively performs as soloist as well as in several ensembles all over Europe.

Lonardi graduated in classical guitar with Ruggero Chiesa at the Milan Conservatory, then specialized in lute with Hopkinson Smith.

Lonardi's discography includes dozens of recordings and a number of monographic CD’s devoted to the music of Francesco Canova da Milano, Pietro Paolo Borrono, Joan Ambrosio Dalza, Vincenzo Capirola, the works for vihuela of Luis Milán and the lute works of John Dowland.

Lonardi is professor of lute at the Istituto Superiore di Studi Musicali "Franco Vittadini" in Pavia and at the Scuola di Musica Antica (School of Early Music) in Venice.
