= Nicholas Alexandre Voboam II =

French luthier

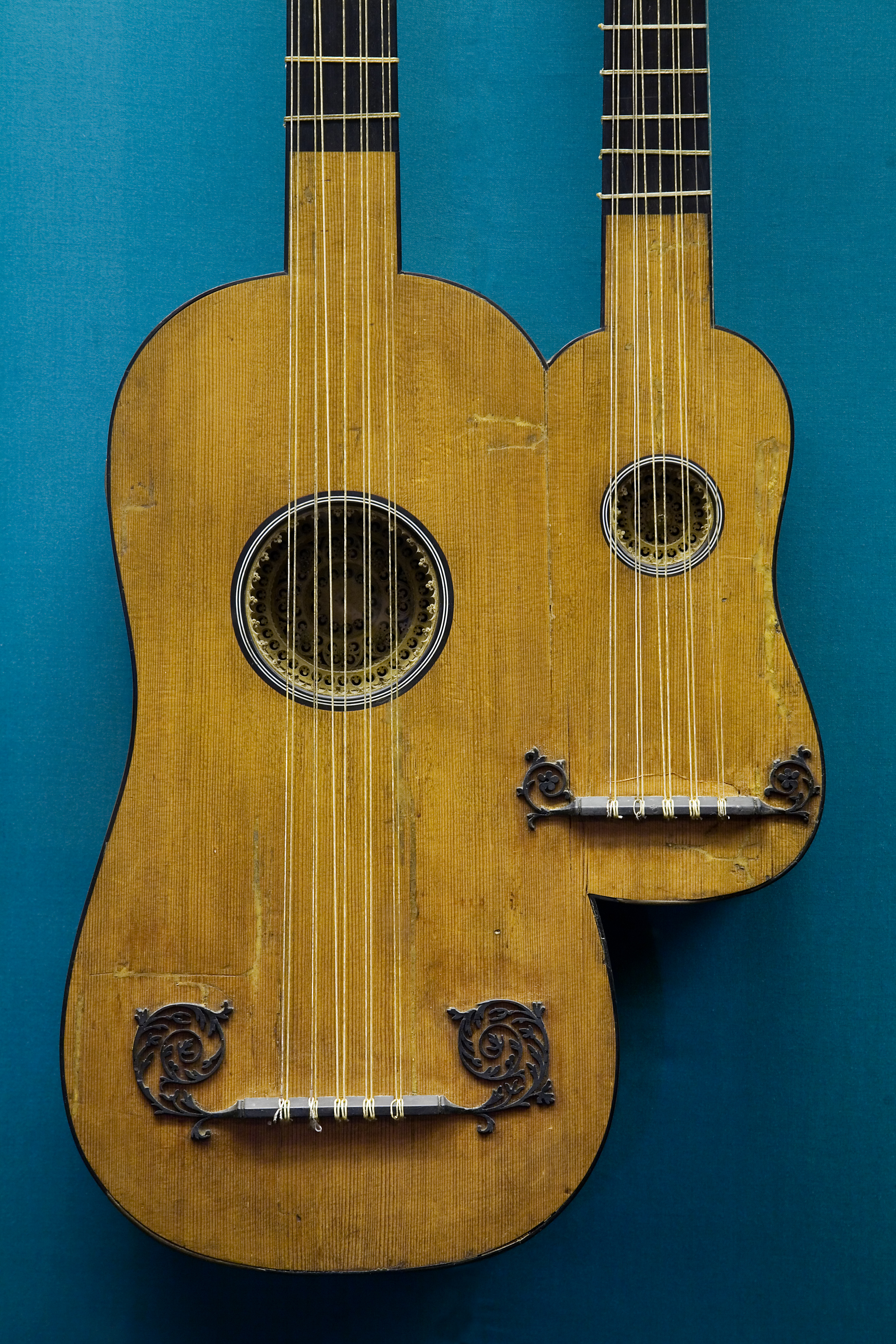
Double guitar (5 double course) by Alexandre Voboam in Paris, 1690

(Nicholas) Alexandre Voboam (1634/46–1692/1704) was a French luthier from a renowned Parisian family of instrument makers. A total of 26 signed baroque guitars and two violas da gambas have been attributed to the Voboam family of which three guitars bear the signature of Alexandre Voboam and the date 1652.

He was the son of Luthier René Voboam and brother to Jean Voboam. Records note that Alexandre Voboam lived at rue des Arcis, Paris and that he married Anne Bourdet on 19 January 1671. Alexandre's guitars were held in high esteem during his lifetime and a century later were still considered desirable instruments.
