= Stefano Pesori =

17c Italian 5-course Baroque guitarist, composer

Stefano Pesori (fl.1648 in Mantua – 1675) was a 17th-century Italian 5-course Baroque guitarist, composer, and teacher.

Pesori was a renowned guitarist in his time, and had upwards of 140 students, including high-ranking nobility. He is not well known today. He worked as a composer, teacher, and performer in the 17th century, using both written notation and Alfabeto – the precursor to modern “lead-sheet”systems – that associated letters with certain harmonies.

Stefano Pesori published five books in his lifetime. Graham Wade remarks that they, “employ[ed] both strummed and plucked styles, including battute accompaniments to songs and dances” . Many of these books heavily borrow material from one another, as shown by evidence that he used identical engraving plates for multiple sections of many of his works. The books contain lists of his students, often arranged according to their social status. His prototypical student would have been novices – as evidenced by the book's largely simplistic music. These encompass music in lower positions of the instrument that avoided complex textures, rhythms, and techniques. Some of his more famous contemporaries – such as Giovanni Paolo Foscarini (fl. 1600–1647) and Francesco Corbetta (c. 1615 – 1681), paved the way for the Guitar's popular emergence in the coming centuries.

== Writings ==
- Galeria Musicale (Verona, 1648)
- Lo Scrigno Armonico (Mantua, 1640)
- Toccate di Chitarriglia (Verona, 1660)
- I Concerti Armonici di Chitarriglia (Verona, 1645)
- Ricreationi Armoniche overo Toccate di Chitarriglia (Verona)
