= Giovanni Angelo Testagrossa =

Italian lutenist and singer

Giovanni Angelo Testagrossa (9 April 1470 – December 1530) was an Italian lutenist and singer. He was born in Pavia and worked in Milan, Mantua, Ferrara and many other cities. Testagrossa was a renowned teacher; his pupils included Isabella d'Este. A long-standing hypothesis that Testagrossa taught Francesco Canova da Milano is now considered unlikely to be true (Wilson, 1997, citing Franco Pavan). None of Testagrossa's compositions survive.
