= Toyohiko Satoh =

Japanese lutenist and composer

Toyohiko Satoh (佐藤 豊彦, Satō Toyohiko; born 1943) is a Japanese guitarist, lutenist, and composer.

== Life and career ==
Toyohiko Satoh was born on November 4, 1943, in Fukuyama, Hiroshima. At Rikkyo University in Tokyo, Satoh studied music history with Tatsuo Minagawa and guitar with Kazuhito Ohosawa. He gave his first guitar recital in the Tokyo Bunka Kaikan concert hall in 1965. At Rikkyo, he also began his studies of the lute.

In 1968, Satoh came to Europe; he studied lute with the pioneering lutenist Eugen Müller-Dombois at the Schola Cantorum Basiliensis in Basel, Switzerland. Two years later, in 1970, he recorded the first LP devoted entirely to the solo Baroque lute; since then he has recorded extensively for Philips, Telefunken, EMI, Harlekijn, and Channel Classics Records. One of his recordings won the Edison Prize. He has been involved in over 50 ensemble recordings, with such artists as Gustav Leonhardt, Nikolaus Harnoncourt, and Elly Ameling.

He has concertized throughout the world as soloist. His October, 1982 debut at the Carnegie Recital Hall in New York was praised in the New York Times; the critic Tim Page praised his "intensity and sense of drama" and "electric tension and rhythmic spring". He has also performed and recorded with many chamber ensembles, including the group Alba Musica Kyo, which he formed.

He also performs in a lute duet, named Ayumi, with his daughter Miki Satoh (born in the Netherlands in 1989, and currently studying chemical science and engineering at Ariake National College in Japan); they recorded a recital for Carpe Diem in 2010.

In 1973, he became a professor at the Royal Conservatory in The Hague, Netherlands, a position he held until 2004. He has also taught numerous master classes in Italy (Accademia Musicale Chigiana in Siena), Germany, the US, Canada and Japan. As a teacher of the baroque lute, he has advocated the use of gut strings with no metal admixtures, and of historically accurate performance techniques. His 1987 book, "Method for the Baroque Lute" (Munich: Tree Editions) is widely used.

He has been actively composing, and performing and recording his compositions since 1981, including two CDs for Channel Classics. In 2000 he became the president of LGS-Japan (Lute & Early Guitar Society of Japan) and LGS-Europe.

== Selected discography ==
- Kurofune (Black ships) – lute songs for Europeans in 17thC Japan. Carpe Diem.
