= Claude Abromont =

French musicologist, essayist and writer (born 1955)

Claude Abromont (born 1955 in Paris) is a French musicologist, essayist and writer. He is mostly known for his Guide de la théorie de la musique.

== Biography ==
After studying the history of music, harmony and counterpoint at the Conservatoire national supérieur de musique et de danse de Paris (CNSMDP), Abromont studied musical composition with Max Deutsch at the École normale de musique de Paris. He obtained a 1st Prize in musical analysis at the CNSMDP in 1986 (Claude Ballif's class).

== Publications ==
=== Articles ===
- Enseigner la composition musicale ?, in collaboration with François Leclère, in Musique en jeu n°29, November 1977, p. 7-9
- À propos de Farben : invention et figuration dans la pensée musicale de Schoenberg, Analyse musicale n°3, April 1986, p. 46-50
- Le chant de Linos by André Jolivet, Traversières magazine n°19/53-20/54, Spring/Summer 1996, p. 107-111
- La Musique complète; Berlioz, 1844, in Wagner m'a tué !, les enjeux de la musique en 25 citations, under the direction of Élisabeth Brisson, Ellipses, 2011, p. 103-110
- Sonorités brutes, in Art brut, collection abcd, under the direction of Bruno Decharme and Barbara Safarova, exhibition catalog, Flammarion, 2014, p. 68-69
- Préface, in Le Quatuor à cordes, vers les séductions de l'extrême, under the direction of Mélanie Guérimand, Muriel Joubert and Denis le Touzé, Microsillon éditions, 2016
- Analyses et interprétations de la musique, la mélodie du berger dans le Tristan et Isolde de Richard Wagner, by Jean-Jacques Nattiez, Revue musicale OICRM, vol. 3, no 2,

=== Musicological works ===
- Guide de la théorie de la musique, with Eugène de Montalembert (Fayard/Lemoine, 2001), translated into Spanish (Fondo de cultura economica)
- Abrégé de la théorie de la musique, (éditions Fayard/Lemoine, 2003)
- Petit précis du commentaire d'écoute (Panama, 2008, reissued under the same title by éditions Fayard, 2010)
- Guide des genres de la musique occidentale, with Eugène de Montalembert (Fayard/Lemoine, 2010)
- Guide des formes de la musique occidentale, with Eugène de Montalembert (Fayard/Lemoine, 2010)
- La Symphonie fantastique; enquête autour d'une idée fixe (Philharmonie de Paris, collection Rue Mus-Style, 2016), Special Jury Prize, awarded by the Prix France Musique des Muses (2017)

=== Novels ===
- Symphonie criminelle en mi bémol (Bayard, 2013)
