= Jean-Baptiste Voboam =

French luthier

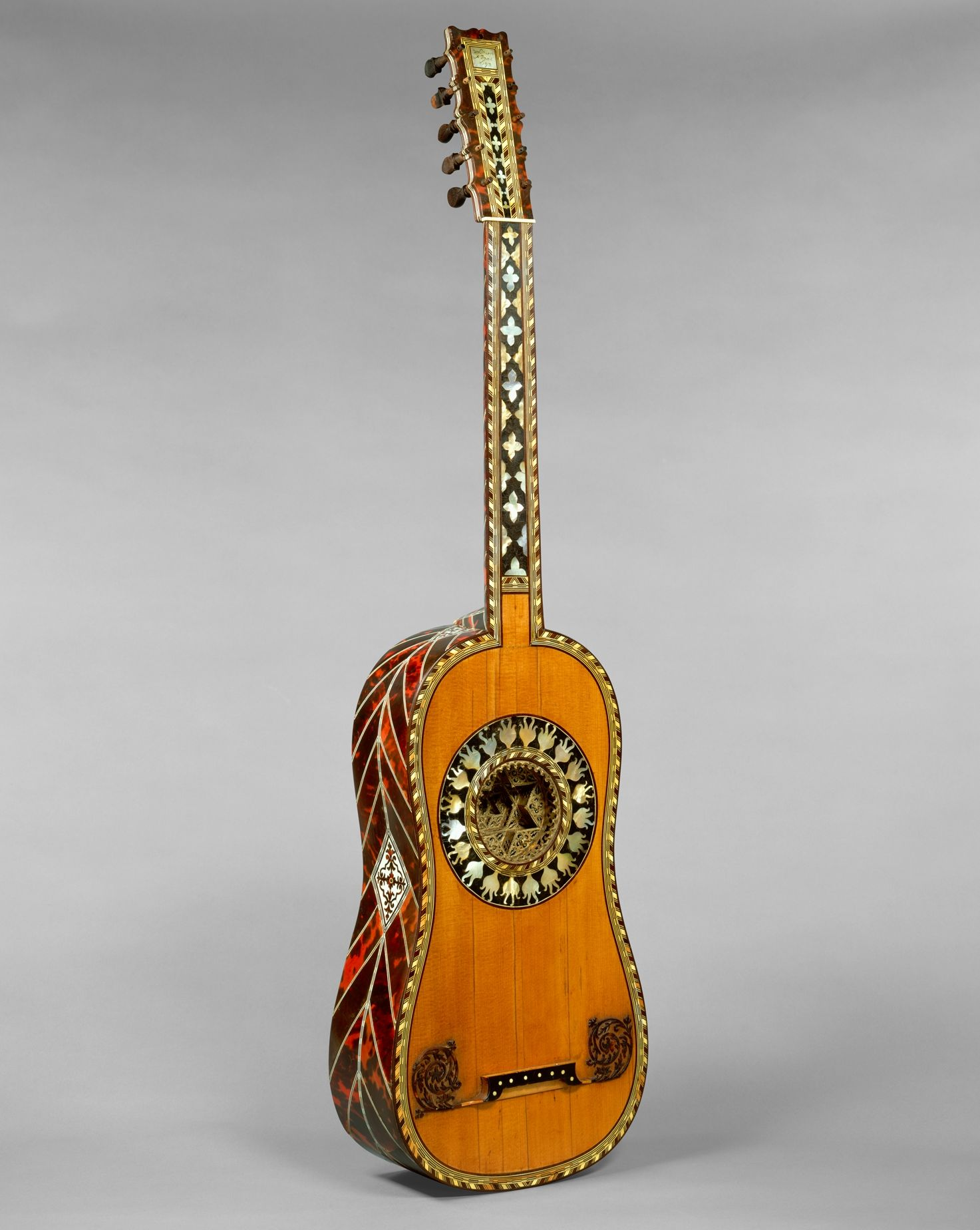
17th-century guitar, attributed to Jean-Baptiste Voboam, part of the Metropolitan Museum of Art collection, is decorated with tortoiseshell, ebony and ivory chevrons, framed scrollwork, lozenges and a gilded rossette with mother of pearl edging.

Jean-Baptiste Voboam (1634/46–1692) was a French luthier known for making elaborately embellished baroque guitars. Voboam came from a family of luthiers who were active in Paris from 1640 until 1740. Tortoise and mother of pearl would be used for decorative oval motifs called godron. The soundboard, fingerboard, pegbox and other parts of Voboam instruments were edged with ivory and ebony diagonal inlays called pistogne.

A painting by Guillaume Voiriot called Monsieur Aublet in Fancy Dress Playing the Guitar depicts a man playing a guitar very similar in appearance to one in the collection of the Metropolitan Museum of Art that has been attributed to Voboam on the basis on an engraved inscription on the instrument.

The National Museum of American History has a six course guitar made by Voboam in 1730. Based on the size of the guitar it may have originally been a 4 course guitar. Made of spruce with rosewood veneer, the rosewood sides are inlaid with ebony and ivory.
