= Louis Krasner =

Russian-born American classical violinist (1903–1995)

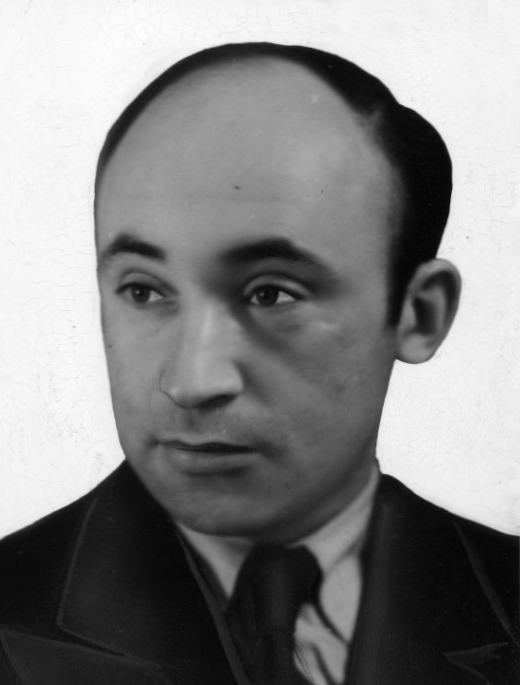
Photo by Max Fenichel (1936)

Louis Krasner (21 June [O.S. 8 June] 1903 – 4 May 1995) was a Russian-born American classical violinist who premiered the violin concertos of Alban Berg and Arnold Schoenberg.

== Biography ==
Louis Krasner was born in Cherkassy, Kiev Governorate, Russian Empire (now part of Ukraine). He arrived in the United States at the age of 5, and graduated from the New England Conservatory of Music in 1922. He continued his studies with Lucien Capet in Paris, Otakar Ševčík in Písek, Czechoslovakia, and Carl Flesch in Berlin. His concert career began in Europe, where he championed the concertos of Joseph Achron and Alfredo Casella.

In 1935 he commissioned Alban Berg's Violin Concerto, which he premiered on 19 April 1936 in Barcelona, with Hermann Scherchen conducting the Pablo Casals Orchestra. He also premiered Arnold Schoenberg's Violin Concerto in December 1940, with Leopold Stokowski leading the Philadelphia Orchestra. Among the American composers whose works he premiered were Roger Sessions, Henry Cowell, and Roy Harris.

Krasner retired from solo performing to become concertmaster of the Minneapolis Symphony Orchestra, a position he held from 1944 to 1949. From 1949 to 1972 he was professor of music at Syracuse University. In 1976 he joined the faculties of the New England Conservatory of Music and the Berkshire Music Center. He won the 1983 Sanford Medal from Yale University and the 1995 Commonwealth Award.

He died in 1995 in Brookline, Massachusetts, aged 91.

== Stradivarius guitar ==
Krasner owned one of the only surviving guitars made by Antonio Stradivari. He purchased the guitar from London based dealer W.E. Hill & Sons through Rembert Wurlitzer Co. in 1934. The antique guitar, made of spruce and maple, is not quite as large as the modern instrument and has five double strings. It is embellished with a decorative carved rose and inlaid mother-of-pearl. In 1986 the guitar was purchased for $165,000 by the Shrine to Music Museum at the University of South Dakota.
