= Giovanni Maria da Crema =

Italian Renaissance lutenist and composer

- Born: c. 1492; Crema (uncertain), Lombardy, Italy
- Died: after 1548 (traditionally c. 1550)
- Occupations: Composer, lutenist
- Era: Renaissance
- Notable work: Ricercars (c. 15 surviving)

Giovanni Maria da Crema (c. 1492 – c. 1550) was an Italian Renaissance lutenist and composer active during the first half of the 16th century.

== Biography ==
Very little is known about his life. He was probably born in Crema, Lombardy, as suggested by his surname da Crema, which appears in contemporary sources in Latinised form as Cremens. His birth is generally placed in the late 15th century, around 1492.

He was associated with the circle of Francesco Canova da Milano, one of the leading lutenists of the Renaissance. His activities were last documented in the late 1540s.

Giovanni Maria da Crema was described by contemporaries as an eccellentissimo sonatore (“most excellent player”).

== Sources ==
- Brown, Howard Mayer (1965). Instrumental Music Printed Before 1600: A Bibliography. Cambridge, MA: Harvard University Press.
- Chilesotti, Oscar (1902). "Note circa alcuni liutisti italiani della prima metà del Cinquecento". Rivista Musicale Italiana.
- Smith, Douglas Alton (2002). A History of the Lute from Antiquity to the Renaissance. Lute Society of America.
- Wilson, Christopher (1996). Dall’Aquila / da Crema: Ricercars / Intabulations / Dances. Naxos Records.
