= Lodovico Monte =

Lodovico Monte was an Italian music editor and player of the Baroque guitar born in Bologna some time in the early 17th century.

He has two known publications. The first was published in Rome and Macerata in 1637 and was co-edited with Pietro Millioni. Its original title was Vero e facil modo d’imparare a sonare et accordare da se medesimo la chitarra spagnuola. The book was a tutor as well as a songbook, containing a description of rasgueado (Battute) technique and accompaniment for a number of 17th century dances in alfabeto notation: ciaccona, passacaglia, gagliarda, and romanesca. Many of the harmonies Monte and Millioni notated were relatively dissonant for their time. It was reprinted frequently until its last run in 1737, suggesting the continued popularity of 5-course guitar.

The second publication, Vago fior di virtù, dove si contiene il vero modo per sonare la chitarriglia spagnuola, was published in Venice, Italy by music printer Angelo Salvadori. Perhaps meant as an affordable basic tutor, the short 16-page book provides tuning instructions for the 5-course baroque guitar, an explanation of the alfabeto system of chord notation, and strummed accompaniments to songs and dances.

A complete index of the first publication, including a list of pieces included in the work, was done by Gary Boye, a music librarian at Appalachian State University.
