= Resumen de acompañar la parte con la guitarra =

Resumen de acompañar la parte con la guitarra, printed in 1714, is the earliest of three collections of music for five-course guitar, composed and arranged by Santiago de Murcia.

Resumen de acompañar is dedicated to Jacome Francisco Andriani, knight of the Order of Santiago and Extraordinary Envoy of the Catholic Cantons (those areas of Switzerland which remained Catholic after the Reformation), whose patronage Murcia seems to have enjoyed after the death of Maria Luisa Gabriella of Savoy in 1714. It also includes a recommendation from the composer Antonio Literes.
