= Joseph-François Kremer =

French musician

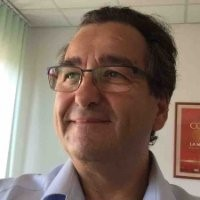
Joseph-François Kremer, October 2016

Joseph-François Kremer (born 22 June 1954) is a French composer, conductor, cellist and musicologist.

== Biography ==
Joseph-François Kremer was born in Lyon (France) in 1954. Currently director of the Conservatoire Darius Milhaud of the City of Antony (Île-de-France). He is associated with an original movement in Postmodernism, cited in the ‘‘Larousse de la musique’’. He is interested in the sound qualities of contemporary music as well as the human role in the context of musical interpretation. As a cellist, he studied with Robert Cordier, Maurice Gendron and Claude Burgos. He studied orchestral conducting with J.C. Hartmann. As a composer, he was principally the disciple of Claude Ballif.

He has written several books which deal with musical phenomenology, especially on the symbolic forms of music (1984), on the great musical topics (1994), on musical aesthetics (2000), as well as on musical theory, among them the first French reissue of Rameau’s Traité d'harmonie of 1722, a project supported by the Fondation Singer-Polignac in 1986, and in 1996 Rameau's Nouveau système de musique théorique of 1726. He has also written several works of comparative aesthetics.

From 1987 to 1994, he directed the Contemporary Music Ensemble Intervalles and performed premières, as a conductor, of works by Jean-Yves Bosseur, Claude Ballif, M. Mathias, Egberto Gismonti, as well as his own works in international festivals : in Czech Republic, Germany, France, with retransmissions on Radio-France and the Radio-Suisse-Romande. He directed the conservatory of the city of Sevran from 1985 to 1996, where he invited Claude Ballif to take a composition class in 1990 as well as Marcel Bitsch, for teaching a theory course open to composers.

Kremer is president of several musical organizations : including Musiques à vivario from 2002 to 2005 for the promotion of classical music in Corsica as well as the Association of the Vocal ensemble les Oréades, creating a repertory of baroque and contemporary music.

Joseph-François Kremer was Professor of Philosophy of Music and Aesthetics at the Schola Cantorum in Paris; he is regularly invited in France and in other countries as a guest professor (towns of Caracas, Baku, Imatra). He currently works with the Fesnojiv Foundation of Venezuela, after having published a book on the musical and social educational system (2003). He is co-author with François-Bernard Mâche of the Chart of the compositional and musicological teaching at the University of Caracas, where he has been teaching as Professor of Aesthetic since 2001.

He has contributed to the publication of more than thirty musicological works and has been the director of several collections for the parisian publishers Méridiens- Klincksieck, Kimé and L'Harmattan.

== Selected works ==
- Le chant de la nuit 5 pièces pour violoncelle seul
- Symphonie à 4 pour flûte, clarinette, violoncelle et piano
- Poussière d'oubli pour clarinette, violon, alto et violoncelle
- Klaviersätze n°1,2,3,4,5,6,7...
- Konzertstück pour violon et orchestre à cordes
- Aria I pour soprano, flûte, violoncelle et piano
- Aria II pour soprano, violoncelle et piano
- Aria III pour soprano et piano
- Symphonie de chambre pour solistes instrumentaux et soprano
- Symphonie No. 3
- Suite lyrique pour grand orchestre
- Anamorphose pour orchestre (1976)
- Anamorphoses II pour orchestre (1978)
- Naturalia pour grand ensemble de cuivres
- Dixtuor pour flûtes traversières
- Petite messe des morts "pour une âme retrouvée"
- Dio vi salvi regina, hymnus pour 5 voix solistes
- Saxophonie pour saxophone seul
- Petite pièce pour harpe
- Saxazeriphonie pour saxophone seul
- Contre chocs pour deux accordéons
- Permitted games pour quatuor de guitares
- Petite marche pour sextuor de cuivres
- Adagio pour un film muet pour accordéon et piano (1975)
- Symphonie No. 4 (2005)
- Dialogue pour double quintette à vents (1977)
- Summer Song 1 pour quatuor vocal et trio à vents (1994)
- Summer Song 2 pour 3 sopranos, flûte en sol, perc. et cordes (1995)
- Concerto pour flûte et orchestre à cordes (2008)

== Bibliography ==
- Les formes symboliques de la musique, Paris, Méridiens Klincksieck, Collection de Musicologie, 1984.
- Réédition et analyse du Traité d’Harmonie (1722) by J. P. Rameau, précédé d’une Introduction « Rameau, l’harmonie et les méprises de la tradition », Paris, Méridiens Klincksieck, Collection de Musicologie, 1986; 2nd edition 1992.
- Les grandes topiques musicales, Paris, Méridiens Klincksieck, Collection de Musicologie, 1994.
- L’Offrande musicale de Jean-Sébastien Bach, Introduction et analyse musicale de Marcel Bitsch, Paris, Éditions Kimé, Collection « Musica », 1994.
- Les Préludes pour piano de Claude Debussy en correspondance avec À la recherche du temps perdu de Marcel Proust, Introduction et analyse musicale de Marcel Bitsch, Paris, Éditions Kimé, Collection Musica, 1996.
- Réédition et introduction du Nouveau système de musique théorique (1726) de Jean-Philippe Rameau, Paris, Éditions Aug. Zurfluh, 1996.
- Esthétique musicale. La recherche des dieux enfuis, Paris, L’Harmattan, 2000.
- « Le rôle de la méthode dans l’analogie », in Méthodes nouvelles. Musiques nouvelles. Musicologie et création, under the direction of Marta Grabocz, Strasbourg, Presses Universitaires de Strasbourg, 2000, 171-198.
- « Entre découverte et reconnaissance. Pour une compréhension valide du signe », in Approches herméneutiques de la musique, under the direction of Jacques Viret, Strasbourg, Presses Universitaires de Strasbourg, 2001, 123-138.
- Une expérience musicale et sociale au Venezuela. Vue de l’Ancien Monde, Paris, L’Harmattan, 2003.
- Les formes symboliques de la musique, Paris, L'Harmattan, 2006.
