= Michèle Reverdy =

French composer (born 1943)

Michèle Reverdy (born 12 December 1943) is a French composer.

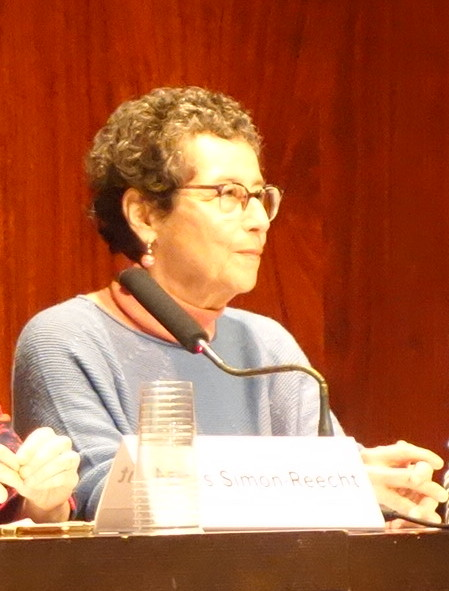
Michèle Reverdy

== Life and career ==
Michèle Reverdy was born in Alexandria (Egypt). She studied at the Conservatoire de Paris especially with Claude Ballif for music analysis and Olivier Messiaen for composition. After completing her studies she took a position in 1983 teaching music analysis and orchestration at the same school and retired as Professor Emeritus.

Reverdy was a resident of Casa de Velázquez in Madrid from 1979 to 1981 and composer-in-residence at the Conservatory of Strasbourg Musica Festival in 1993. She was a producer at Radio France from 1978 to 1992, and received a Lifetime Achievement award from Société des auteurs, compositeurs et éditeurs de musique (SACEM) in 1995. She is the author of two books on Olivier Messiaen.

== Works ==
Reverdy has composed about one hundred works for orchestra, opera, chamber ensemble, vocal music and solo instrument. Selected works include:

- Tetramorphie (Tetramorph) for viola and percussion (1976)
- Concerto for Orchestra (1994)
- Scenic Railway (1984)
- Am Stram Gram (1997)
- Anacolutha, tribute to Olivier Messiaen (2008)
- Arcanum (1979)
- Cante Jondo (1974–80)
- Les Jeux de Protée for flute, viola and harp (1984)
- Cyclades (1988)
- Capricho (1990)
- Le Précepteur, opera, libretto Hans-Ulrich Treichel (de), after the play Der Hofmeister by Jakob Michael Reinhold Lenz, premiered at the second Munich Biennale (1990)
- Crossed Paths (1996)
- Chimera (1992)
- Chimère, Concerto for viola and 18 instruments (1994)
- Rencontres for viola solo (1994)
- Médée, opera, after the novel Medea. Stimmen by Christa Wolf, premiered at the Opéra de Lyon (2001)
- Five Pieces for cello (2004)
- Harp Concerto (2005)
- Of Irony against the Absurdity of the World (2009)

=== Discography ===
Reverdy works have been recorded and issued on CDs, including:

- Michele Reverdy - Salabert actuels, Harmonia Mundi
- M.F.A. Musiques Francaises d Aujourd'hui, Harmonia Mundi
- Medee Live, Harmonia Mundi
- Autour de Messiaen, Squires Productions (NY - USA)
- Sappho, ADDA

=== Bibliography ===
- Michèle Reverdy,L'œuvre pour piano d'Olivier Messiaen, Paris : Leduc, 1978
- Michèle Reverdy, L'œuvre pour orchestre d'Olivier Messiaen, Paris : Leduc, 1988
- Michèle Reverdy, Composer de la musique aujourd'hui, Paris : Klincksieck, 2007

Yves Balmer et Emmanuel Reibel, Michèle Reverdy : compositrice intranquille, Paris : Vrin, 2014
