= Xavier Diaz-Latorre =

- Born: 1968 (age 56–57) Barcelona, Spain
- Occupation: Conductor
- Instrument: Lute

Xavier Díaz Latorre is a Spanish musician. Born in Barcelona in 1968, he studied at advanced level with Oscar Ghiglia at the Musikhochschule, Basel, graduating in 1993. His subsequent interest in early music led him to study the lute with Hopkinson Smith at the Schola Cantorum Basiliensis. He has completed several courses in choral conducting and a post-graduate course in orchestral conducting.

He has been awarded several international performance prizes in France and Spain.

Since 1995 he has been actively involved in the world of baroque opera, having participated in major productions such as Semele (Handel) at the Berlin State Opera with the Akademie für Alte Musik Berlin, conducted by René Jacobs; L'Orfeo (Monteverdi) at the Goldoni Theatre, Florence, the Théâtre de la Monnaie, Brussels, Covent Garden, London, the Grand Théâtre de Provence, Aix-en-Provence, the Théâtre des Champs-Élysées, Paris, and the BAM, New York City, again under René Jacobs but with Concerto Vocale; L’Orfeo again, but with Le Concert des Nations and Jordi Savall at the Teatro Real, Madrid and the Liceu, Barcelona; Solimano (Johann Adolph Hasse) at the Berlin and Dresden State Operas with Concerto Köln and René Jacobs; La Serva Padrona (Pergolesi) at the Philharmonie, Berlin and Ludwigsburg Palace with the Balthasar-Neumann-Ensemble and Thomas Hengelbrock; Dal Male il Bene (Marco Marazzoli and Antonio Maria Abbatini) at the Landestheater, Innsbruck with Concerto Vocale and Attilio Cremonesi; Don Chisciote della Mancia in Sierra Morena (Francesco Bartolomeo Conti) with the University of Salamanca Baroque Orchestra and Wieland Kuijken.

== Festivals ==
Xavier Díaz-Latorre frequently takes part in major international festivals in Europe, the USA, South America, and South Korea. He is a member of renowned orchestras and chamber groups such as those conducted by Jordi Savall – Hesperion XXI, La Capella Reial de Catalunya and Le Concert de Nations, and has been invited to perform with other major orchestras and ensembles such as the Orquesta Nacional de España or Al Ayre Español.

== Laberintos Ingeniosos ==
He has his own vocal and instrumental ensemble, Laberintos Ingeniosos, which specialises in the performance of music from the Spanish Golden Age. The group’s first disc, Danzas de Rasgueado y Sones de Palacio, with music by the Aragonese composer Gaspar Sanz, recorded on the Zig-Zag Territoires label, has received excellent reviews in the media, and has been broadcast by several international radio stations throughout Europe, Israel, Australia, South Korea and North America. Laberintos Ingeniosos has now made further CDs of music from the Iberian Peninsula performed on period instruments, such as Goyesca, seguidillas boleras, with music by Fernando Sor, and “...entre el cielo y el infierno...”, with works by Francisco Guerau and José Marín. In addition, Xavier Díaz-Latorre has taken part in over 30 CDs for Alia Vox and Deutsche Harmonia Mundi, and has made recordings for numerous television and radio stations in Europe, North and South America and Korea.

== Teaching ==
He has been invited to give courses at many venues in Spain, Italy, Germany and Switzerland, also at Seoul (South Korea). He is a former resident teacher of lute, basso continuo and chamber music at the Escola Superior de Música de Catalunya (ESMUC). He is a former teacher and researcher at the Royal Conservatory of Brussels. In 2024, he joined the faculty of the Schola Cantorum Basiliensis.
