= The Rawlins Stradivarius =

Antique guitar

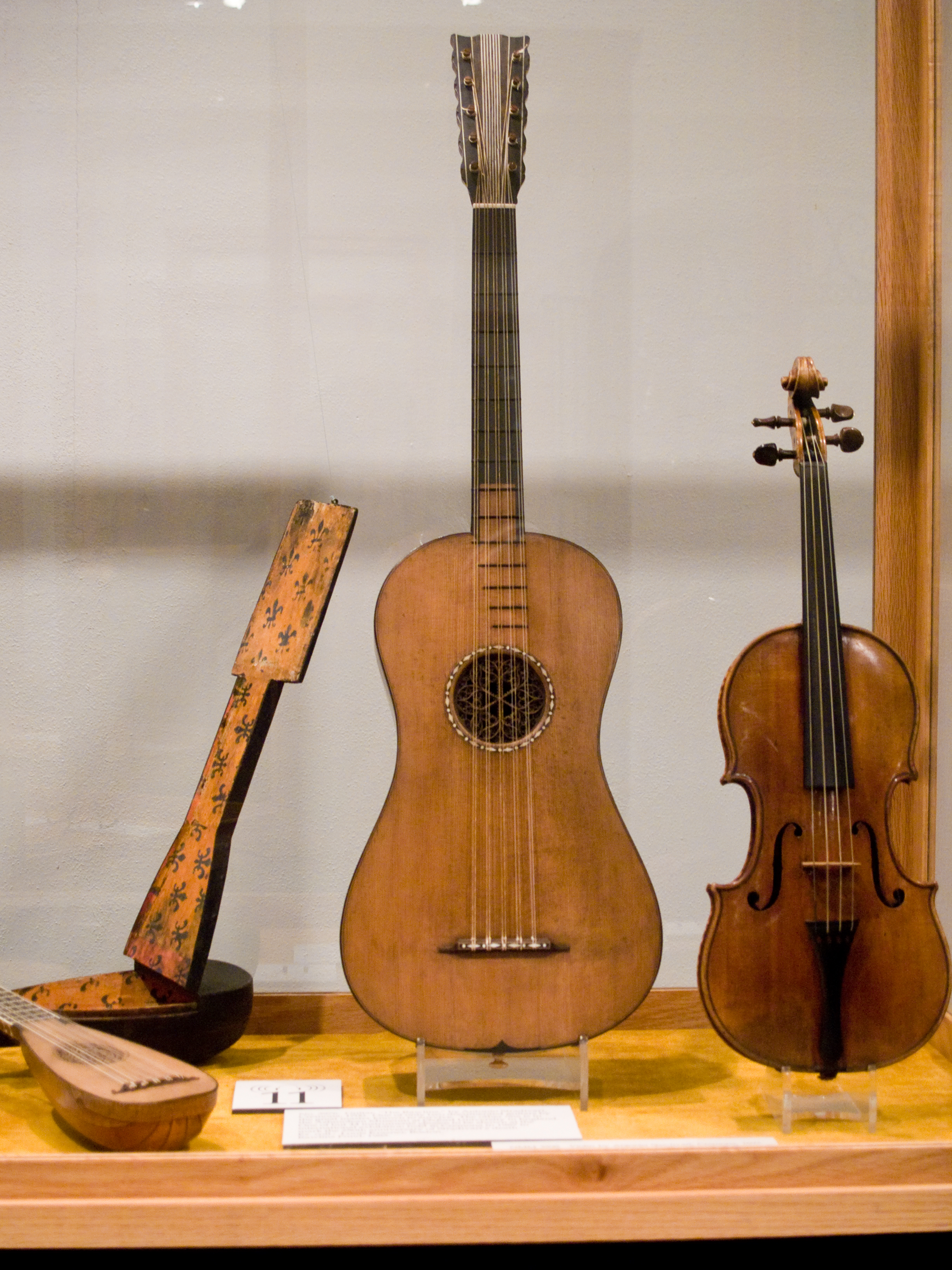
The Rawlins Stradivarius guitar (1700), part of the Stradivarius collection at the National Music Museum, Vermillion

The Rawlins Stradivarius is an antique guitar crafted by Antonio Stradivari in 1700. It is one of only four surviving guitars made by the Italian luthier. The Rawlins was purchased by the National Music Museum in South Dakota from violinist Louis Krasner in 1985. Krasner had purchased it in 1934 through a dealer in London.

== Design ==
The curator of stringed instruments at the National Music Museum notes that most Italian Baroque guitars from that period were more ornate than the Stradivari guitars: "Stradivari was probably the first maker to highlight the natural beauty of the wood on a guitar. He used a spruce top and beautiful violin-style figured maple for the back and sides instead of ebony or the other tropical hardwoods that were commonly used at the time." It has a rosette design with decorative mother of pearl inlay.

The guitar has a 29-inch scale length, which is a long scale length. Some have speculated that it might sound similar to a baritone guitar.

== See also ==
- List of guitars
