= Gérard Buquet =

French musician

Gérard Buquet (born 1954) is a tubist, conductor and composer, who was born in France.

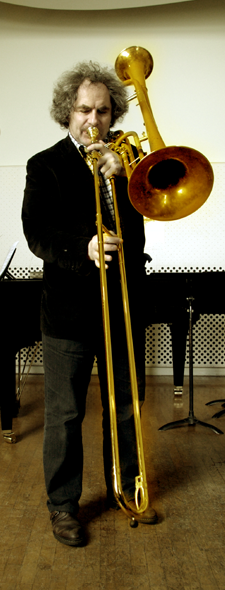
Gérard Buquet plays his contrabass trombone with two bells

== Life ==
He studied at the Conservatoire National Supérieur de Paris, and musicology at the Strasbourg University. Composition studies with Claude Ballif and Franco Donatoni.

As instrumentalist he has participated in numerous premiers, and has appeared regularly as a soloist at all leading festivals for contemporary music. He has frequently played with the Orchestre de Paris, the Orchestre National de France, and the Orchestre Philharminique de Radio France, as well as various jazz groups.

From 1976 to 2001 he was the tuba player of the 'Ensemble Intercontemporain'.

During this time he worked on several research projects at the Ircam Centre. He has written a book on the 'contemporary tuba' (funded by the French cultural ministry). His teaching is inspired by coordination and breathing techniques developed by Jacques Dropsy. Gérard Buquet taught chamber music at the CNSM in Paris from 1997 to 1999, and then obtained the poste as tuba professor there in 1999. In 1999 the television channel ‘Mezzo’ devoted a portrait film to his work.

In 2000 he became professor (director of the 'Ensemble für Neue Musik') at the Musikhochschule Karlsruhe, Germany. Since 2003 he also teaches contemporary music for the DE diploma at the 'Cefedem' in Dijon.

In October 2007 he conducted « les Etudes d’après Séraphin » by W. Rihm, for the tenth anniversary of the ZKM, with the Ensemble für Neue Musik of the Musikhochschule Karlsruhe, and the Ballet of the Staatstheater of Karlsruhe. In July 2008 he conducted a concert devoted to the harp repertoire at the ZKM (Ensemble für Neue Musik Karlsruhe, soloist : Frédérique Cambreling). He is currently working on a composition for 6 voices and 6 instruments, which will be premiered in Heidelberg in Winter 2008 by the 'Klangforum and la Scola Cantorum' of Heidelberg, and a composition for saxophone and electronics (commissioned by Ircam) which will receive its first performance in Paris 6 November 2009, interpreted by Marcus Weiss.

== Compositions (Excerpts) ==
- 2006: "Surimpressions"
- 2005: "Les danses du temps"
- 2001: "Adverb"
- 1997: "Zwischen"

== Trivia ==
Gérard Buquet owns the only ever built contrabass trombone with two bells.
