= Lex Eisenhardt =

Lex Eisenhardt (born 1952, in Netherlands) is a performer and recording artist on early plucked instruments, such as the vihuela, the baroque guitar, and the 19th-century Romantic guitar. He studied lute and guitar at the Utrecht Conservatory. In 1981 he was appointed professor of guitar and early plucked instruments at the Sweelinck Conservatorium (later the Conservatorium of Amsterdam). In the forefront of the Historically Informed Performance (HIP) on the guitar, Eisenhardt was the first to make several gramophone recordings (in 1981 and 1984) with music by the Catalan composer Fernando Sor on a period instrument from the early 19th century. He has given solo recitals and lectures in many European countries, Australia, and the United States. Well-known guitarists such as Johannes Moller and Izhar Elias studied with him.

== Recordings ==
Eisenhardt has made several recordings on period instruments. In 1993 he made a world premiere recording of works from the Secondo Libro (c. 1655) by Angelo Michele Bartolotti. Together with soprano María-Luz Álvarez he recorded two CDs: one with Spanish songs by Esteban Daza and José Marín, and another with songs and solos from the time of Monteverdi (see discography).

=== Selected discography ===
- Fernando Sor, works for guitar (Etcetera Records, 1984)
- Spanish Songbooks, works by Esteban Daça and José Marin. With María-Luz Álvarez, soprano (Emergo Classics, 2000)
- Canta Venetia, songs and solos from the time of Monteverdi. With Maria-Luz Alvarez, soprano (Etcetera Records, 2006)
- Luys de Narvaez, works for vihuela (Etcetera Records, 1991)
- Angiol Michele Bartolotti, suites (Etcetera Records, 1993)
- Francesco Corbetta, The Royal Guitar (Verbena, 2003)

== Publications ==
In 2015 Eisenhardt published a monograph on the baroque guitar, Italian Guitar Music of the Seventeenth Century, Battuto and Pizzicato (University of Rochester Press). The monograph was well received by aficionados of early music.

=== Selected articles ===
- Eisenhardt, Lex (2007). "Bourdons as Usual". The Lute, the Journal of the Lute Society. 47.
- Eisenhardt, Lex (2007). "Dissonance and battuto, a hidden practice in the performance of seventeenth-century guitar music?". The Lute, the Journal of the Lute Society. 47.
- Eisenhardt, Lex (2014). "Baroque guitar accompaniment: where is the bass?". Early Music. 42 (1): 73–84. doi:10.1093/em/cas126.
