= Pietro Paolo Borrono =

Italian composer (1490–1563)

Pietro Paolo Borrono, or Petro Paulo da Milano or Petter Paul Borrono (born about 1490, Milan - died 1563) was an Italian composer and lutenist of the renaissance.

== Known works ==
- 1536 Intabolatura de leuto de diversi autori (Milan: Giovanni Antonio Casteliono), seven of the nineteen pieces in this anthology are by Borrono
- 1546 Intabulatura di lauto del divino Francesco da Milano et dell’eccellente Pietro Paulo Borrono da Milano (Venice: Girolamo Scotto), a shared volume, also containing pieces by Francesco Canova da Milano. This is book two of Scotto's ten-volume series of lute tablatures. A German edition of this book was published in 1550 by Rudolf Wissenbach of Zürich.
- 1546 Libro secondo di una collanna di Intabolatura di lauto, Antonio Casteliono
- 1548 Intavolatura di lauto dell'eccellente Pietro Paolo Borrono da Milano (Venice: Girolamo Scotto), a collection of pavanes. This is book eight of Scotto's ten-volume series of lute tablatures.
- 1563 La intabolatura de lauto (Venice: Girolamo Scotto), a collection of dance music
