= Santiago de Murcia =

Spanish guitarist and composer (1673–1739)

Santiago de Murcia (25 July 1673 – 25 April 1739) was a Spanish guitarist and composer.

== Biography ==
Until new research was published in 2008, few details about the life of Santiago de Murcia were known. However, it is now known that he was born in Madrid and that his parents were Juan de Murcia and Magdalena Hernandez. He married Josefa Garcia in May 1695.

In his printed collection of guitar music, Resumen de acompañar, Murcia describes himself as Master of Guitar to the Spanish Queen Maria Luisa of Savoy. She was the first wife of the first Bourbon king of Spain, Philip (Felipe) V, a grandson of Louis XIV of France who succeeded to the Spanish throne on the death of Carlos II in November 1700. The marriage took place by proxy in Turin on 11 September 1701. On 3 November the marriage was re-celebrated in Figueras, Gerona. In April 1702, Felipe V left on a tour of his Italian possessions appointing Maria Luisa as regent in his absence. There is no reason to suppose that Murcia travelled with him to Naples, Italy, or met the composers Arcangelo Corelli and Alessandro Scarlatti. Maria Luisa arrived in Madrid on 30 June and Murcia is not likely to have been appointed as her Master of Guitar before this date. It is assumed that he held the post until her death in 1714. Antonio de Murcia was appointed instrument maker to the Queen in 1704.

In 1714 Murcia dedicated a guitar treatise to Jácome Francisco Andriani, a special envoy of the Catholic cantons of Switzerland to the King of Spain. (Andriani, born in northern Italy, moved to Spain where he was admitted to the Order of the Knights of Santiago in 1712). Andriani made it possible for Murcia to publish his guitar treatise by sponsoring the engraving of the work on copper plates.

Although two of the surviving manuscript collections of Murcia's music – "Passacalles y obras" and "Codice Saldivar no. 4" – came to light in Mexico in modern times, they were most probably taken there at a later date by subsequent owners. It now seems unlikely that Santiago de Murcia actually travelled to Mexico himself. "Passacalles y obras" is dedicated to a certain Joseph Alvarez de Saavedra, but it is not known whether this is the same "Joseph Alvarez" who died in Puebla in 1737.

Apparently Andriani had trading links with Latin America, especially with Chile and Mexico. The most likely scenario is that Murcia made manuscript copies of his music for patrons which were exported to the New World.

Later in his life, in 1729, he signed a declaration of poverty. He died in Madrid in 1739.

One of the important aspects of the music of Murcia is his interest in a wide range of pre-existing music for guitar. Thus the collections offer works of different styles grouped next to one another, which certainly offers a rich and varied panorama of the baroque repertoire for guitar.

On 18 September 2006, it was reported in the newspaper El Mercurio that the manuscript of music by Santiago de Murcia Cifras selectas de guitarra dating from 1722 had been discovered in Chile. The discovery was made by the musicologist Alejandro Vera from the Music Institute at Pontificia Universidad Catolica de Chile. The music consists of French and Spanish dances.

== Works ==
- 1714: Resumen de acompañar la parte con la guitarra
- 1722: Cifras selectas de guitarra
- c. 1730: Codice Saldivar no. 4
- 1732: Passacalles y obras

== Sources ==
- Monica Hall: Guitar anthologies of Santiago de Murcia. Open University dissertation. English : Book, Milton Keynes : Open University, 1983. OCLC: 59292792. British Library Reference number D50374-84
- Craig H Russell: Santiago De Murcia: Spanish theorist and guitarist of the early eighteenth century. English: Book : Thesis/dissertation/manuscript, Microform. 1981. OCLC: 25778189
- Craig H. Russell (edited) : Santiago de Murcia's Codice Saldivar no. 4. English: Book – 2 vols. University of Illinois Press. 1995.
- Elena Machado Lowenfeld: Santiago de Murcia's thorough-bass treatise for the baroque guitar (1714) Engels : Book : Thesis/dissertation/manuscript.1974. OCLC: 8075098
- Neil Douglas Pennington: The development of baroque guitar music in Spain, including a commentary on and transcription of Santiago de Murcia's 'Passacalles y obras' (1732) Engels : Book. Publisher: [S.l. : s.n.], 1979. OCLC: 66179517
- Alejandro Vera: Una nueva fuente para la música del siglo XVIII: el manuscrito Cifras Selectas de Guitarra de Santiago de Murcia (1722). Revista Resonancias Nº 18, Mayo 2006 . Facultad de Artes . Pontificia Universidad Catolica de Chile
- Alejandro Vera: Santiago de Murcia's "Cifras Selectas de Guitarra (1722) : a new source of music for the baroque guitar" in Early Music, Vol 35, No.2, May 2007, pp 251–269.
- Alejandro Vera: Santiago de Murcia (1673–1739): new contributions on his life and works. Published in Early Music, Vol 36 No 4, 2008, pp 597–608.
