= Walter Gerwig =

German lutenist and composer

Walter Gerwig (26 November 1899 – 9 July 1966) was an influential German lutenist, choral conductor and composer. He was one of the pioneers in the revival of early music revival and historical performance practice. He was also a choral conductor. Through his concerts and recordings Gerwig made a significant contribution to the revival of the lute and its repertoire in Europe and America.

Together with Fritz Jöde, he was one of the co-founders of the first folk music school in Berlin, the Berliner Volksmusikschule. From 1928 he was the lute teacher at the Berlin's Akademie für Kirchen- und Schulmusik. During the Nazi era he did not join the NSDAP and avoided appearing at Nazi-sponsored events. From 1952 he headed the lute course at the State Academy of Music in Köln.

Gerwig made numerous LP recordings of Baroque and Renaissance lute repertoire. He received the prize of the Deutschen Schallplattenkritik in 1965, for the recording of J.S. Bach's Suite in G minor (BWV 995) a year before his death. In addition, Gerwig also composed several works for lute, guitar and other stringed instruments.

== Recordings ==
- Bach: Lute Music (Nonesuch H-71137)
- The Baroque Lute (Nonesuch H-71229)
- Baroque Lute Music (Three Centuries of Musick 3C 302)
- The Art Of The Lute: Renaissance And Baroque Masterpieces From France, England And Germany (RCA VICS-1362)
- The Art of the Lute, Vol. 2: Renaissance Masterpieces From Italy (RCA VICS-1408)
