= Monica Hall =

English musician and writer

- Occupations: Author, guitarist, musicologist

Monica Hall is an English guitarist, author and musicologist. She is also a reviewer and writer for The Lute Society (UK) and article contributor to the Lute Society of America Quarterly and Classical Guitar magazine. Hall's main field of study is the baroque guitar and vihuela.

== Biography ==
On completing her music degree at the University of Manchester in 1959; Hall embarked on a career as a music archive librarian most notably for the City of Westminster, London until 1998.

== Articles and publications ==
- Baroque guitar stringing : a survey of the evidence (Guildford:The Lute Society, 2010) ISBN 0-905655-40-0
- Recovering a lost book of guitar music by Corbetta (In Consort : the journal of the Dolmetsch Foundation, Vol. 61 (2005) ISSN 0268-9111
- The "Guitarra espanola" of Joan Carles Amat (In Early Music, Vol. 6, no. 3, July, 1978)
- Dissonance in the guitar music of Francesco Corbetta (In Lute : the journal of the Lute Society, Vol. XLVII (2007) ISSN 0952-0759
- Angiol Bartolotti's Lettere tagliate (In Lute : the journal of the Lute Society, Vol. XLVII (2007) ISSN 0952-0759
- Tuning instructions for the baroque guitar in Bibliothèque Nationale Res. Vmc Ms. 59, f. 108v (In Lute : the journal of the Lute Society, Vol. XLVII (2007) ISSN 0952-0759
