= Lex Dwyer =

Australian rules footballer

Personal information
- Full name: Lex Dwyer
- Born: 22 March 1956 (age 70)
- Original team: North Reservoir
- Height: 183 cm (6 ft 0 in)
- Weight: 76 kg (168 lb)

Playing career^{1}
Years	Club	Games (Goals)
1975–1977	Fitzroy	6 (3)
- ^{1} Playing statistics correct to the end of 1977.

Lex Dwyer is a former Australian rules footballer, who played for the Fitzroy Football Club in the Victorian Football League (VFL).

Lex Dwyer transferred to VFA club Prahran for the 1978 season and kicked a goal in their historic Grand Final win over Preston in the same year.
