= Francisco Guerau =

Spanish Baroque composer (1649–1722)

Francisco Guerau (1649–1722) was a Spanish Baroque composer. After being born on Mallorca, he entered the singing school at the Royal College in Madrid in 1659, becoming a member of the Royal Chapel as an alto singer and composer ten years later. Named a member of the Royal Chamber of King Charles II of Spain in 1693, he also served as a teacher at the singing school until 1701. His best-known work is a collection of pieces for baroque guitar entitled Poema harmónico that was published in 1694.
