= Peter Croton =

Swiss-American lutenist and guitarist

Peter Croton (born 1957, in New York City) is a Swiss-American lutenist and guitarist. He has attained prominence in his field through his numerous recordings, performances, publications, and teaching engagements. His recorded repertoire includes music from the Renaissance, Baroque and Classical periods, as well as his own compositions. His publications include a figured bass manual for classical guitarists and publications of compositions for voice and lute.

== Career ==
Peter Croton began playing folk guitar as a child, and classical and jazz guitar as a teenager. He began his lute studies with Loris Chobanian at the Oberlin Conservatory of Music and continued with Eugen Müller-Dombois and Hopkinson Smith at the Schola Cantorum Basiliensis. In 1984 he won first prize at the "Erwin Bodky" competition for Early Music in Cambridge, Massachusetts. He has performed widely on the lute and guitar as a soloist and with musical partners such as Theresia Bothe, Derek Lee Ragin and Susanne Rydén. He has also appeared on numerous CD recordings. He specializes in instruments of the lute family, but also occasionally performs and records on romantic guitar and jazz guitar.

He teaches lute and thoroughbass at the Schola Cantorum Basiliensis, guitar-thoroughbass at the Conservatory of Music in Basel, and guitar-thoroughbass and historical performance practice at Bern University of the Arts (Musikhochschule).

Since 2011 Peter Croton has been included in the Marquis Who's Who in the World.

== Publications ==
- “Open House” (German Lute Society 2001), five new compositions for lute and voice, and one lute solo.
- ”Remembrance of things past” (Tree Edition 2009), four new musical settings of texts by William Shakespeare for voice and lute.
- "Figured Bass on the Classical Guitar" (Amadeus Verlag 2005).
- "A Dialogue on a Kisse" by Henry Lawes (Tree Edition 2009) editor and arranger.

== Selected recordings ==
- Bach on the Italian Lute (Guild, 2008)
- The Renaissance lute - yesterday and today (Musicaphon, 1996))
- THE LUTE PLAYER and other songs (Centaur Records, 2012), music by Peter Croton, with Theresia Bothe – vocals, and others
- Remembrance of Things Past - lute songs & solos by John Dowland & Peter Croton (Guild, 2010), with Theresia Bothe – voice, and special guest Derek Lee Ragin - voice
- Love Songs from Five Centuries – from Baroque to Folk (Centaur Records, 2006), songs and lute solos, with Theresia Bothe - soprano
- Italian Lute Songs (Channel Classics Records, 1993), with Derek Lee Ragin - countertenor
- I'll sing a song for you (Zah Zah/Guild, 2008), songs by Peter Croton, with Theresia Bothe - vocals, and others
- Sweeter Than Roses (Balance, 1997), with Derek Lee Ragin, countertenor and Gerd Lünenberger, recorder
