= Francesco Canova da Milano =

Italian composer

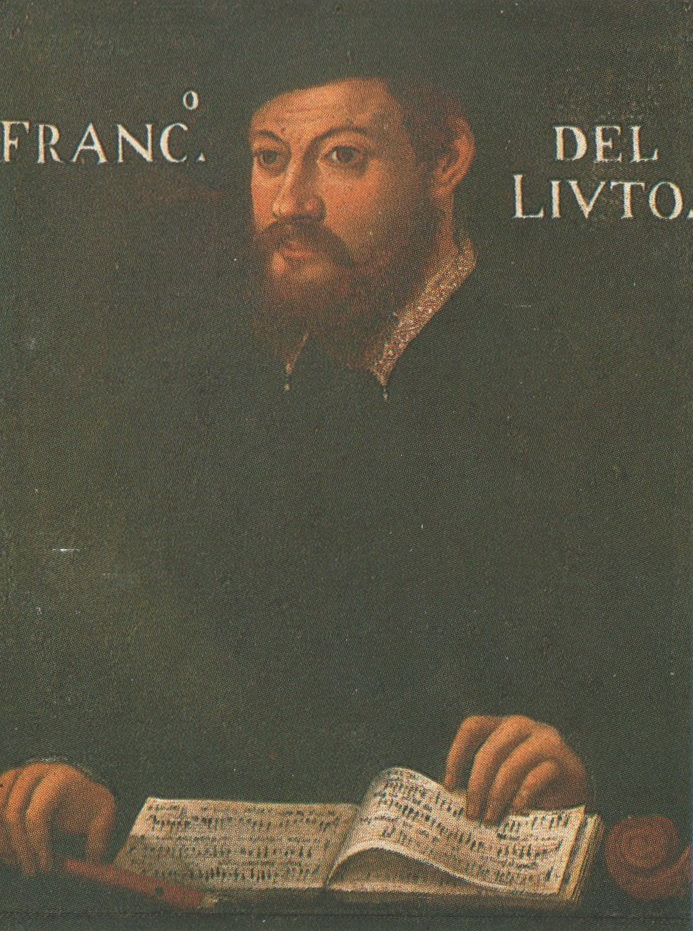
A possible portrait of Francesco Canova da Milano (Pinacoteca Ambrosiana, Milan)

Francesco Canova da Milano (Francesco da Milano, also known as Il divino, Francesco da Parigi, etc.) (18 August 1497 – 2 January 1543) was an Italian lutenist and composer. He was born in Monza, near Milan, and worked for the papal court for almost all of his career. Francesco was heralded throughout Europe as the foremost lute composer of his time. More of his music is preserved than of any other lutenist of the period, and his work continued to influence composers for more than a century after his death.

== Life ==
Francesco da Milano was almost certainly born in Monza, a small city some 15 km north-northeast of Milan. His father Benedetto was a musician, as was his elder brother Bernardino. According to Luca Gaurico's Tractatus astrologicus (1552), Francesco studied under Giovanni Angelo Testagrossa, but today this is considered somewhat unlikely. By 1514 Francesco was a member of the papal household in Rome. From that time for most of his career he was closely associated with the papal court. He and his father became private musicians to Pope Leo X in October 1516; Francesco's father kept this position until December 1518, but Francesco stayed until Leo's death in 1521. Little is known about his subsequent career in Rome, but he was still living in the city in early 1526: on 16 January 1526 he and one other lutenist performed for Pope Clement VII and Isabella d'Este.

Details of Francesco's later life are sketchy. He may have served at the Parisian court for a short time, since some sources refer to him as Francesco da Parigi. In 1528 he obtained a canonry in S Nazaro Maggiore in Milan, which he would cede to his brother in 1536. He may have travelled to Murano in 1530. Between 1531 and 1535 he served Cardinal Ippolito de' Medici, who died in 1535. In the same year Francesco worked as lute teacher to Ottavio Farnese, grandson of Pope Paul III. In a document dated 1 January 1538 Francesco is listed as a member of the household of Cardinal Alessandro Farnese, a famous patron of the arts. In July Francesco married one Clara Tizzoni, a Milanese noblewoman, and moved to Milan, where the couple lived at least until September. By early 1539 Francesco and his father were once again employed by the papal court.

Nothing is known about Francesco's last years and his death, except that he probably did not die in Milan. The exact date of death, 2 January 1543, was recorded only by Luca Gaurico. Francesco's brother outlived him by at least 19 years, and died sometime after 1562. Francesco's father probably outlived his son as well; he died at some point before 1555.

== Works ==
Already by 1530 Francesco's music was widely known and studied. A few of his works were published in France by Pierre Attaingnant in 1529, five volumes of lute music comprising mostly Francesco's works were published in Milan in 1536. There are many 16th- and 17th-century manuscript sources for his works, as well. Today, more than a hundred ricercars and fantasias (two terms used interchangeably in Francesco's oeuvre), some 30 intabulations and a few other pieces by Francesco are known. His music represents the transition from the loose improvisational style of his predecessors to the more refined polyphonic textures of later lute music. One of the defining characteristic features of Francesco's style is the manipulation and development of short melodic motifs within a "narrative" formal outline. Francesco was drawing on techniques found in contemporary vocal music, e.g. works by Josquin des Prez and composers of his generation. Aside from his influence on the development of lute music, he is also important for being among the first composers to create monothematic ricercars. Francesco's reputation today rests on his ricercars and fantasias, but contemporaries apparently held his intabulations of vocal works by other composers to be the best part of his œuvre.

The collected extant lute music of Francesco, edited by Arthur Ness, was published by Harvard University Press in 1970 (ISBN 0-674-53955-9). As such, the organizing number, akin to the Opus number and other such devices, is Ness.

== "Canzona" ==
A composition called "Canzona by Francesco da Milano" (better known as the song "The City of Gold") is commonly misattributed to da Milano. It is actually a musical hoax by lutenist and famous mystificator Vladimir Vavilov, who composed this tune and credited it to Francesco da Milano. After being released by rock band Aquarium in 1987, the song became a big hit in the Soviet Union and beyond and raised questions about the actual credit. It was not until the 2000s that mystification was revealed and the credit for the hit went posthumously to Vavilov.

== Recordings ==
- Christopher Wilson and Shirley Rumsey, "Francesco Canova da Milano - Fantasias, Ricercars and Duets", Naxos (1994)
- Ben Salfield, "Fantasie: 21 Fantasias by Francesco Canova da Milano", Red C (2004)
- Hopkinson Smith, "Francesco da Milano: Fantasias, Intabulations, Ricercari, Dances, Reconstructions", Naïve (2008)
- Tsiporah Meiran, Francesco da Milano : Research for lute, Band of Hippies (2010)
- Paul O'Dette, "Francesco di Milano 'Il divino'", Harmonia Mundi (2013)
- Nigel North "Dolcissima Et Amorosa: The Lute Music of Il Divino, Francesco Canova da Milano Vol. 1" RGS (2014)
- Nigel North "A Decoration of Silence: The Lute Music of Il Divino, Francesco Canova da Milano Vol. 2 " RGS (2015)
- Sandro Volta, "Francesco da Milano: Music for lute" Brilliant Classics (2015)
- Siro Pillosu, "Fantasie Divine, lute music by Francesco da Milano", Ibé (2019)
- Duo Imbesi Zangarà, Francesco da Milano Complete Duets Original works and Joanne Matelart’s Arrangements players Carmelo Imbesi e Carmen Zangarà, Classical Music 3.0, (2021)
- Duo Imbesi Zangarà, Francesco da Milano Fantasia a due Liuti from Castelfranco Veneto Manuscript, Single Track, players Carmelo Imbesi e Carmen Zangarà, Classical Music 3.0, (2024)
