= Hopkinson Smith =

Lutenist and guitarist

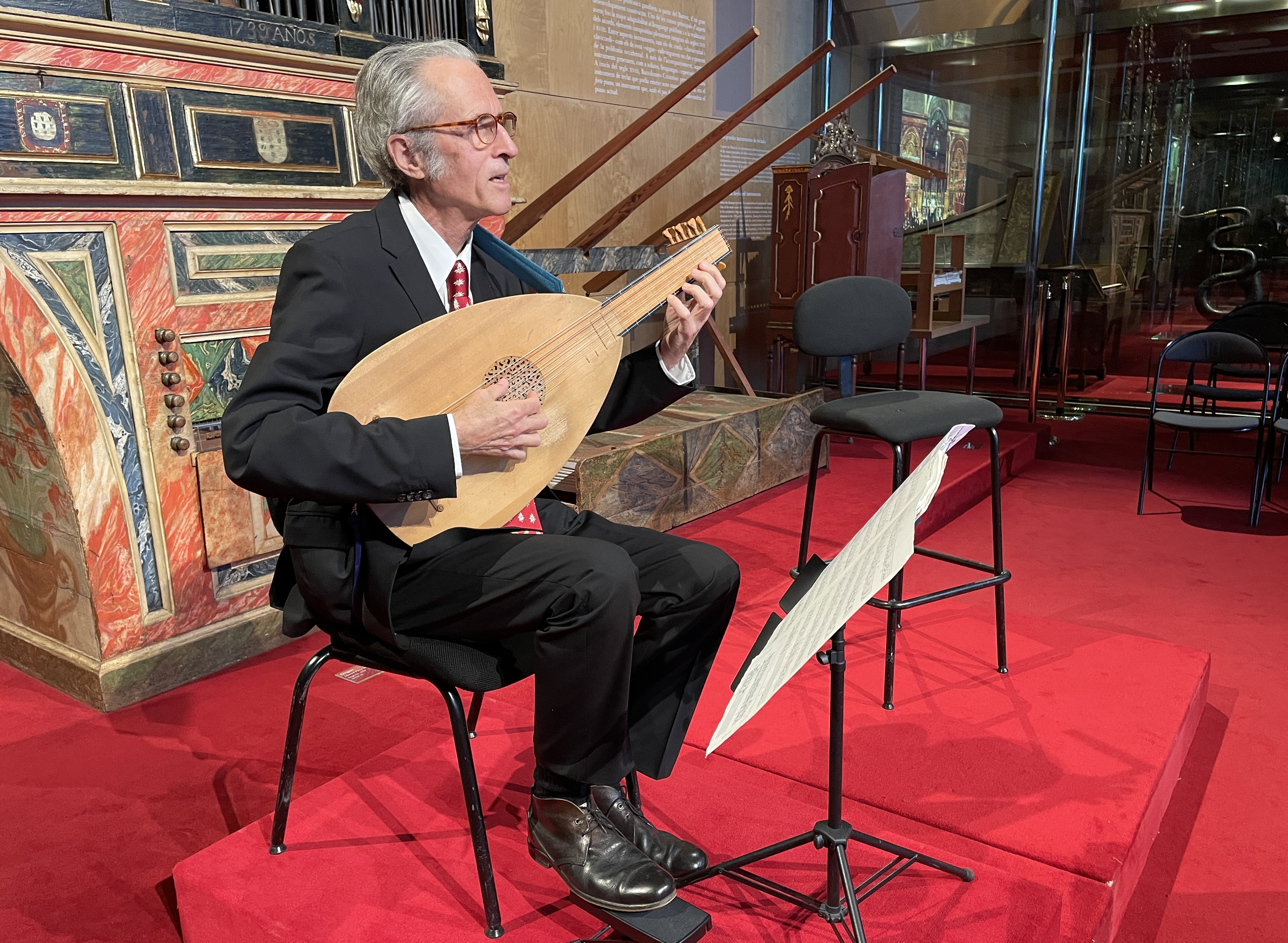

Background information
- Born: 7 December 1946 (age 79); New York City, New York, United States
- Genres: Renaissance music, Baroque music
- Occupations: Composer, instrumentalist, music teacher, pedagogue
- Instruments: lute, baroque guitar, vihuela
- Years active: 1970s–present

Hopkinson Smith (born December 7, 1946) is a Swiss-American lutenist and pedagogue, longtime resident in Basel, Switzerland.

Smith was born in New York City, the son of architectural writer and photographer G. E. Kidder Smith. He graduated from Harvard University with Honors in Music (Thesis on "The Pavans of Daniel Bacheler"). He moved to Europe in 1973 to study lute and vihuela with the renowned Catalan classical guitarist Emilio Pujol, as well as Eugen Mueller-Dombois.

In the mid-1970s, Hopkinson Smith was involved in the founding of the ensemble Hespèrion XX, which led to his ten-year collaboration with Jordi Savall.

Since the mid-1980s, Hopkinson Smith has focused principally on solo music for early plucked instruments. These include the vihuela, Renaissance lute, theorbo, Renaissance and Baroque guitars and the baroque lute.

His 2000 recording of the J.S. Bach sonatas and partitas for solo violin adapted for baroque lute has been called 'arguably the best you can buy of these works – on any instrument' by Gramophone magazine. He additionally recorded the J.S. Bach cello suites adapted for theorbo.

Hopkinson Smith gives concerts and masterclasses throughout Europe, Asia, Australia and North and South America. He lives in Basel, Switzerland, where he taught at the Schola Cantorum Basiliensis until his retirement in 2020.

== Teacher ==
Hopkinson Smith’s former students include Rolf Lislevand, Xavier Diaz-Latorre, Evangelina Mascardi, Miguel Yisrael, Edin Karamazov, Luciano Contini, Andreas Martin, Yasunori Imamura, Rafael Bonavita, and Peter Croton.
