= Pieces de viole =

French Baroque bass suites

Pièces de viole were collections of suites for bass viol and usually continuo written by several French Baroque composers, most notably Marin Marais, whose five books of 596 pieces published between 1686 and 1725 form a core of the viol repertoire.

Early pièces did not include continuo parts; examples of these may be found in the oeuvres of Sieur de Sainte-Colombe and Nicolas Hotman. Derived from lute and theorbo music, they often featured preludes non mesurés, and virtuosic bowed trills, whilst remaining French in their dance rhythms and melodies. Formally they also mirrored the pièces de clavecin being written by virtuoso harpsichordists.

Marais and his contemporaries further established a uniquely French tradition of virtuosic pieces for viol and continuo. The pièces were typically written in dance forms like the Allemande, Gavotte, Sarabande, and Gigue, augmented by a Prélude or a Fantaisie and with additional character pieces like Plaintes and Tombeaux.

The French pièce de viole is also recognizable by the trend, brought to perfection by Marais, of the composer including detailed directions for performance in the score. Ornaments, bowings, dynamics, and incredibly specific fingerings make this repertoire a veritable time capsule for modern performers to explore. Marais generally did not provide realisations or instruction regarding his ornamentation, but further understanding of his intentions as a composer can be gained by consulting the works of his contemporaries Danoville and De Machy, among others.

Marais went so far as to distinguish between two different kinds of vibrato and direct which chords should be “broken”. This particular repertoire is one of the first to have such consistent attention paid to giving directions for technical execution, in contrast to the vast majority of contemporaneous compositional practices. It is all the more remarkable given the inherently costly and labour-intensive business of printing and publishing sheet music at that time.

== Notable composers ==
Composers who wrote pièces de viole:

- Sieur de Sainte-Colombe
- Sieur de Sainte-Colombe le Fils
- Marin Marais
- Sieur de Machy
- François Couperin
- Louis de Caix d'Hervelois
- Joseph Bodin de Boismortier
- Antoine Forqueray
- Jean-Baptiste Forqueray
- Charles Dollé
- Roland Marais
- Jacques Morel (composer)
