= Charles Medlam =

English bass violist and cellist

Charles Medlam (born 1949) is an English cellist, also known for his performances on viola da gamba.

== Biography ==
Medlam was born on 10 September 1949 in Port of Spain, Trinidad. He studied the cello with Jane Cowan in London, Maurice Gendron at the Paris Conservatoire, Wolfgang Herzer at the Vienna Hochschule für Musik. Subsequently, at the Salzburg Mozarteum, he studied cello with Heidi Litschauer and performance practice with Nikolaus Harnoncourt.

Medlam become interested in the bass viol and early performing styles, and founded London Baroque with his wife Ingrid Seifert in 1977. As well as ensemble work, Medlam has popularised and recorded the solo gamba music of composers such as Nicolas Hotman, Jean Lacquemant (Dubuisson), Sainte-Colombe and De Machy.

A hand-book for cellists "Approaches to the Bach Cello Suites" was published in 2014 by Fretwork Editions and is now in its third edition.

His novel "Sally and Caitlin" was published in 2025.

== Selected recordings ==
- Marc-Antoine Charpentier, Sonate à huit H.548, Musique de théâtre pour "Andromède" H.504, Concert pour quatre parties de violes H.545, Musique de théâtre pour "Circé" H.496, London Baroque, basse de violon and conducting, Charles Medlam. CD Harmonia Mundi 1986 (HMC 901244)
