= A 2 Violes Esgales =

The Ensemble À Deux Violes Esgales, stylized on their website as A 2 Violes Esgales, was formed in 1984 by the gambists Sylvia Abramowicz and Jonathan Dunford. The group has recorded a dozen albums mostly for Accord, Universal Music France. Based in Paris they tour the world with varied programs from recitals to a larger group with singers.

The ensemble takes its name from the manuscript now known as the Concerts à Deux Violes Esgales du Sieur de Sainte Colombe which bears the inscription A 2 Violes Esgales, is the name given to a 17th-century manuscript of music for two bass viola da gambas by Monsieur de Sainte-Colombe found in Alfred Cortot's music library that was transferred to the Bibliothèque Nationale in the 1960s. The book contains music by Lully and 67 Concerts à Deux Violes Esgales. Sainte Colombe's music was brought to public attention by the film Tous les matins du monde by Alain Corneau in 1991, but the pioneer recordings of his music by Jordi Savall and Wieland Kujiken brought the music to the attention of Alain Corneau and music enthusiasts in general.

== Selected discography ==
- Marin Marais suites, 2CD, Ensemble a Deux Violes Esgales, Accord 2006.
