= Dolmetsch =

Dolmetsch is a surname. Notable people with the surname include:

- Arnold Dolmetsch (1858–1940), French-born English musician and instrument-maker
- Carl Dolmetsch (1911–1997), French instrumentalist
- Cécile Dolmetsch (1904–1997), French instrumentalist
- Ricardo Dolmetsch (born 1969), Colombian-American neuroscientist and entrepreneur
- Rudolph Dolmetsch (1906–1942), American-born British instrumentalist, conductor and composer

== See also ==
- Dolmetscher
