= Arnold Dolmetsch =

French-born musician and instrument maker (1858–1940)

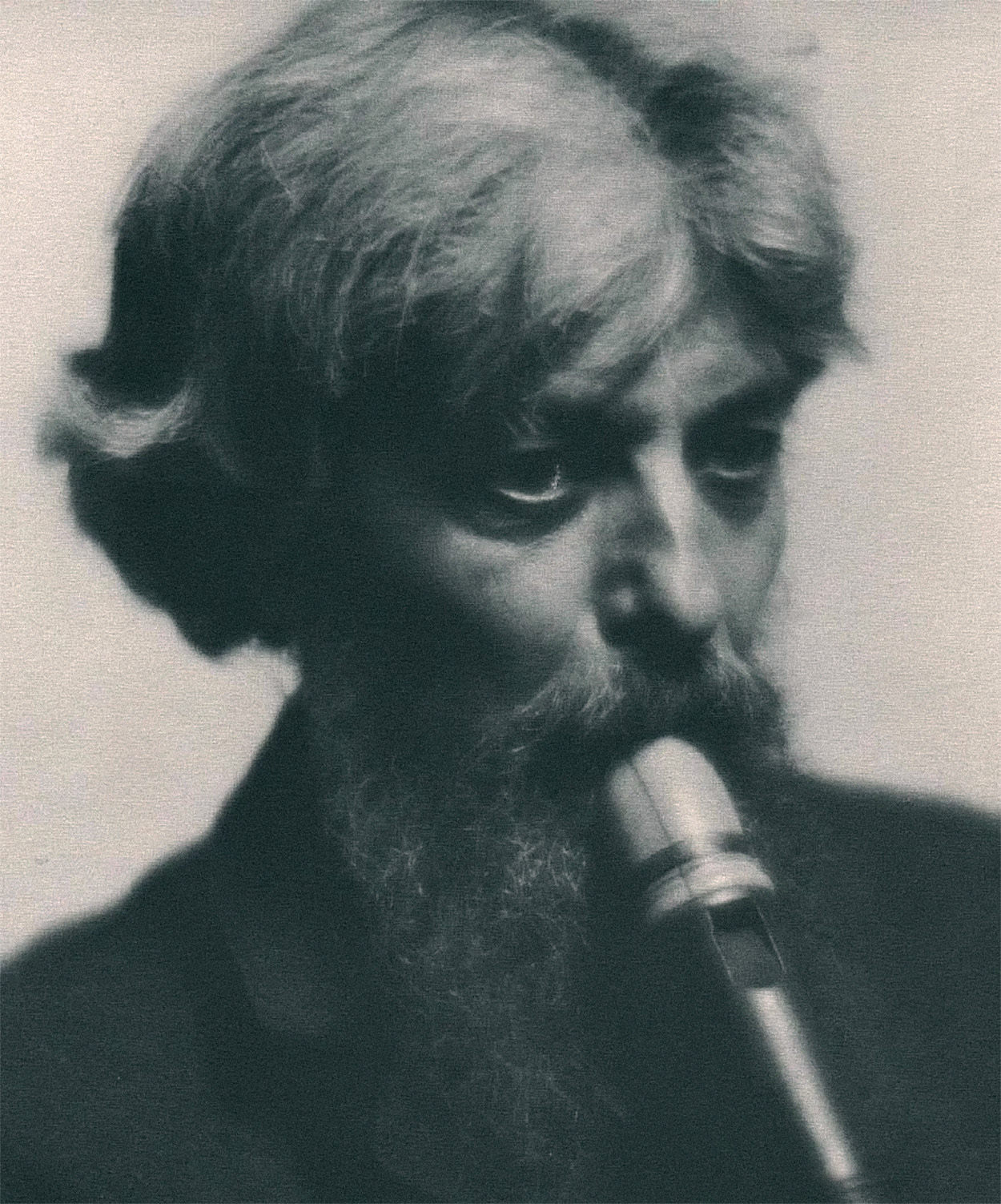
- Portrait of Arnold Dolmetsch playing a recorder, by Alvin Langdon Coburn, 1916
- Born: Eugène Arnold Dolmetsch; 24 February 1858; Le Mans, France
- Died: 28 February 1940 (aged 82); Surrey, England
- Education: Royal College of Music; Brussels Conservatoire
- Occupations: Musician; instrument maker
- Spouses: Marie Morel (m. 1878; div. 1898) Elodie Désirée (m. 1899; div. 1903) Mabel Johnston (m. 1903)
- Children: 4
- Awards: Chevalier of the Legion of Honour

Eugène Arnold Dolmetsch (24 February 1858 – 28 February 1940) was a French-born musician and instrument maker who spent much of his working life in England and established an instrument-making workshop in Haslemere, Surrey. With his family, he was a leading figure in the 20th-century early music revival.

== Early life ==
The Dolmetsch family was originally of Bohemian origin, but Dolmetsch was born in Le Mans, on 24 February 1858, the son of Rudolph Arnold Dolmetsch and his wife Marie Zélie (née Guillouard), where the family had established a piano-making business. It was in the family's workshops that Dolmetsch acquired the skills of instrument-making that would later be put to use in his early music workshops.

He studied music at the Brussels Conservatoire and learnt the violin with Henri Vieuxtemps. In 1883, he travelled to London to attend the Royal College of Music, where he studied under Henry Holmes and Frederick Bridge and was awarded a Bachelor of Music degree in 1889.

== The early music revival ==
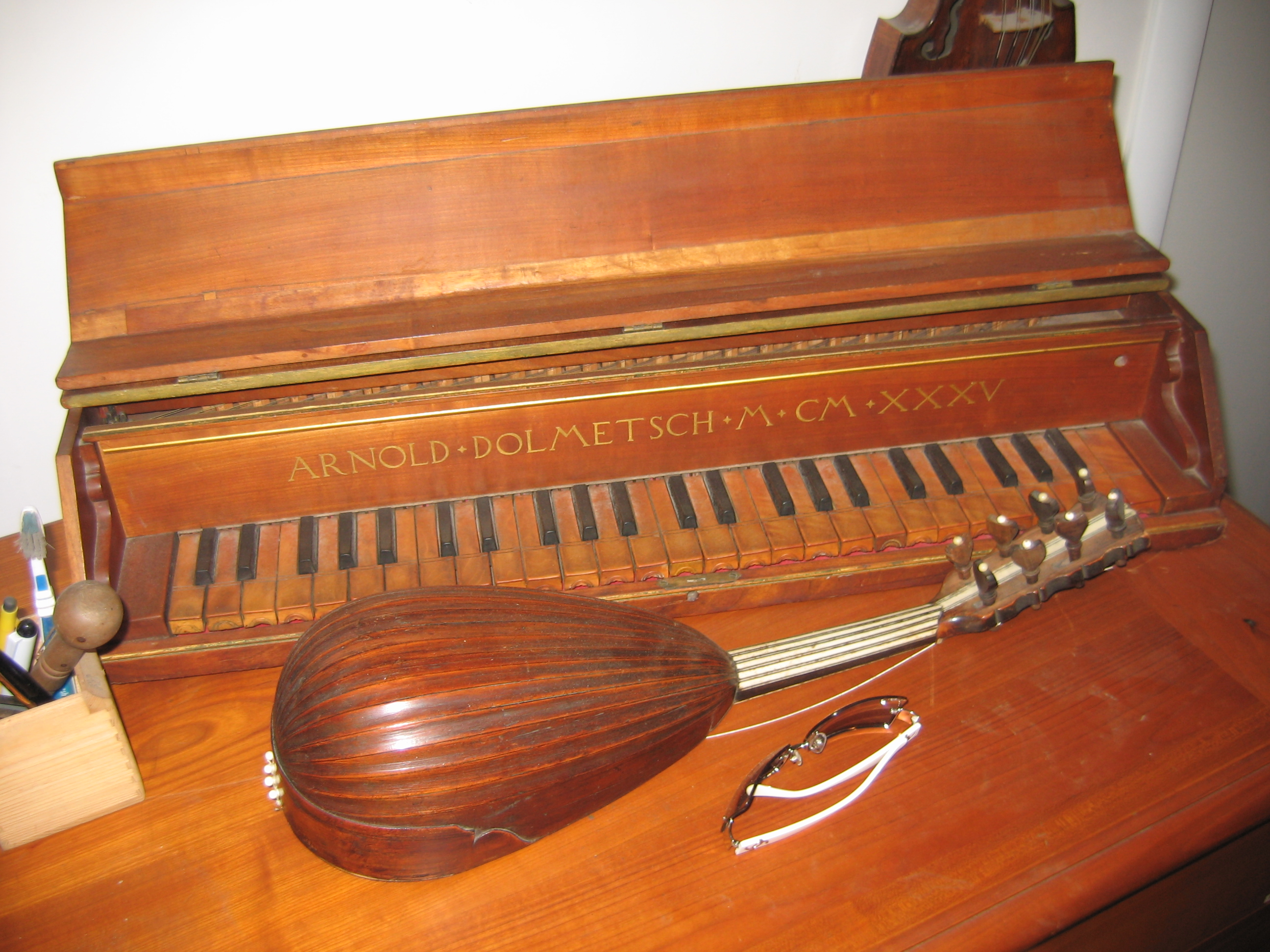
A harpsichord spinet with Arnold Dolmetsch's inscription, in the studio of Swiss luthier, Claude Lebet

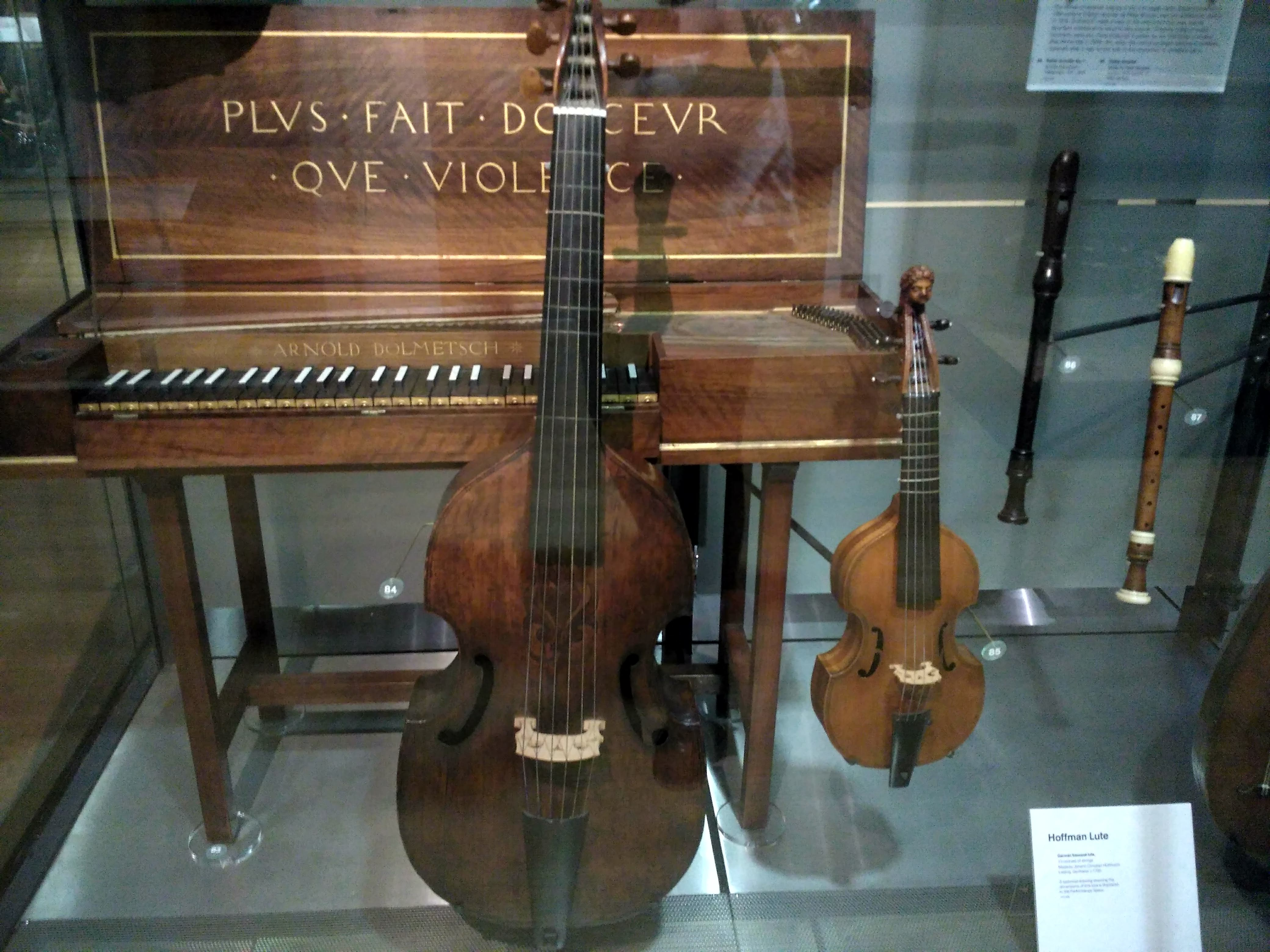
Instruments built and restored by Dolmetsch in the Horniman museum, London, UK.

Dolmetsch was employed for a short time as a music teacher at Dulwich College, but his interest in early instruments was awakened by seeing the collections of historic instruments in the British Museum. After constructing his first reproduction of a lute in 1893, he began building keyboard instruments. William Morris encouraged him to build his first harpsichord which was exhibited in the Arts and Crafts exhibition of 1896. In 1900, he conducted the orchestra at Carpenter’s Hall playing 17th century instruments in a revival of the First Quarto version of Hamlet by the Elizabethan Stage Society. He left England to build clavichords and harpsichords for Chickering of Boston (1905–1911), then for Gaveau of Paris (1911–1914).

During Dolmetsch's time at Chickering, he resided in a house in Cambridge, Massachusetts, partially of his own design, with the aid of architects Luquer and Godfrey. It was through Dolmetsch's work in Cambridge that a wealthy benefactress, Miss Belle Skinner, was able to restore a number of rare instruments, including a spinet owned by Marie Antoinette, which today comprise the founding collection of Yale's Collection of Musical Instruments.

He went on to establish an instrument-making workshop in Haslemere, Surrey, and proceeded to build copies of almost every kind of instrument dating from the 15th to 18th centuries, including viols, lutes, recorders and a range of keyboard instruments. His 1915 book The Interpretation of the Music of the XVIIth and XVIIIth Centuries was a milestone in the development of historically informed performance of early music.

In 1925, he founded an annual chamber music festival, the International Dolmetsch Early Music Festival, which is held every July at Haslemere in the Haslemere Hall.

Dolmetsch settled in Dulwich (at 'Dowlands', 172 Rosendale Road) and was active in the cultural life of London. His friends and admirers included William Morris, Selwyn Image, Roger Fry, Gabriele D'Annunzio, George Bernard Shaw, Marco Pallis, Ezra Pound, George Moore, whose novel Evelyn Innes celebrates Dolmetsch's life and work, and W. B. Yeats.

He was responsible for rediscovering the school of English composers for viol consort (including John Jenkins and William Lawes), leading to Sir Henry Hadow's tribute that Dolmetsch had "opened the door to a forgotten treasure-house of beauty". He was also largely responsible for the revival of the recorder, both as a serious concert instrument, and as an instrument which made early music accessible to amateur performers. He went on to promote the recorder as an instrument for teaching music in schools.

In 1937, he received a British Civil list pension and in 1938 he was created a chevalier of the Légion d'honneur by the French government.

== Dolmetsch family ==
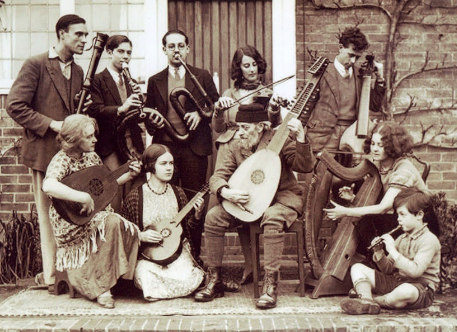
Arnold Dolmetsch and his family: c.1928 Back row: Leslie Ward (Cécile’s husband), Carl, Rudolph, Millicent Wheaton–Dolmetsch, George Carley. Front row: Mabel, Nathalie Dolmetsch–Carley, Arnold, Cécile Dolmetsch-Ward, Christopher Ward - Arnold and Mabel Dolmetsch's family outside Jesses

Arnold Dolmetsch was married three times. On 28 May 1878, he married Marie Morel of Namur, Belgium (a widow, ten years his senior) but was divorced in 1898. Their daughter was Hélène Dolmetsch (1878-1924) who played the viola da gamba and cello. His second wife, to whom he was married on 11 September 1899, in Zürich, was Elodie Désirée, a harpsichord player and the divorced wife of his brother Edgar. This marriage also ended in divorce, in 1903. Thirdly, he was married on 23 September 1903 to Mabel Johnston, one of his pupils, with whom he had four children.

Dolmetsch encouraged the members of his family to learn the skills of instrument-making and musicianship and the family frequently appeared together in concerts, playing instruments constructed in the Dolmetsch workshops. Following the death of Arnold Dolmetsch at Haslemere in 1940, his family continued to promote the building and playing of early instruments.

- Mabel Dolmetsch (1874–1963), his third wife, was a noted player of the bass viol. In 1949 she published Dances of England and France 1450–1600, which includes tunes set by Arnold Dolmetsch.
- Cécile Dolmetsch (1904–1997), his second daughter, was a soprano and specialist of the pardessus de viole.
- Nathalie Dolmetsch (31 July 1905 – 14 February 1989), his third daughter, was born in Chicago to Dolmetsch and his wife Mabel. Nathalie continued her mother's tradition of early dancing and specialised in playing the viola de gamba. She founded the Viola da Gamba Society in 1948 and edited music and wrote on the viols. Her publications include Twelve Lessons on the Viola da Gamba, with Advice by Christopher Simpson (1659), Thomas Mace (1676), Marin Marais (1686), Jean Rousseau (1687), and Hubert Le Blanc (1740) (Schott & Co., London, 1950), and The Viola da Gamba: its Origin and History, its Technique and Musical Resources (Hinrichsen, London, 1962, Hinrichsen No. 759).
- Rudolph Dolmetsch (1906–1942), his first son, was a gifted keyboard player, gamba player, and composer, who died in the sinking of the SS Ceramic in 1942. His Concerto for clarinet, harp and orchestra (1939) was revived and recorded in 2019.
- Carl Dolmetsch (1911–1997), his second son, was a noted recorder player and took over his father's instrument-making business.

=== Family tree ===
- Friedrich Dolmetsch (1782–1861), Swiss composer
  - Frédéric (Frederik) Dolmetsch (1814–1892), director of municipal orchestra in Nantes, arranger and composer
  - Arnold Rudolf Dolmetsch (1827–1874), piano maker, married Marie Zélie Guillouard
    - Arnold Dolmetsch (1858–1940), instrument maker in England, married pianist Marie Morel (1848–1916), Elodie Desirée Franche Lelong (1869–1926) and bass viol player Mabel Johnstone (1874–1963)
      - Hélène Dolmetsch (1878–1924), daughter of Marie, viola da gamba and cello player
      - Cécile Dolmetsch (1904-1997), daughter of Mabel, pardessus de viole player
      - Nathalie Dolmetsch (1905–1989), daughter of Mabel, performer, editor, founder Viola da Gamba Society
      - Rudolph Dolmetsch (1906–1942), son of Mabel, keyboard player, gamba player and composer
      - Carl Dolmetsch (1911–1997), son of Mabel, recorder player and instrument maker
        - Jeanne-Marie Dolmetsch (1942–2018), violinist, pianist, teacher, editor
        - Marguerite Mabel Dolmetsch (born 1942), younger twin sister of Jeanne-Marie, recorder and viol performer and teacher
        - Richard Arnold Dolmetsch (1945–1966), recorder player
    - Edgard Dolmetsch (1864–1904), married Elodie Desirée Franche Lelong, who later became the second wife of Arnold Dolmetsch

== Books and writings ==
- "The Interpretation of Music From The 17th and 18th Centuries" (1915/1946)
- "Select English songs and dialogues of the 16th and 17th centuries" (1954)
- "The Viols," The Consort (1982): 467–471.

== See also ==
- List of historical harpsichord makers
- John Challis (harpsichord), apprentice of Dolmetsch whose instruments gradually incorporated modern mechanics with traditional construction
