= Paris quartets =

1730-38 compositions by Georg Philipp Telemann

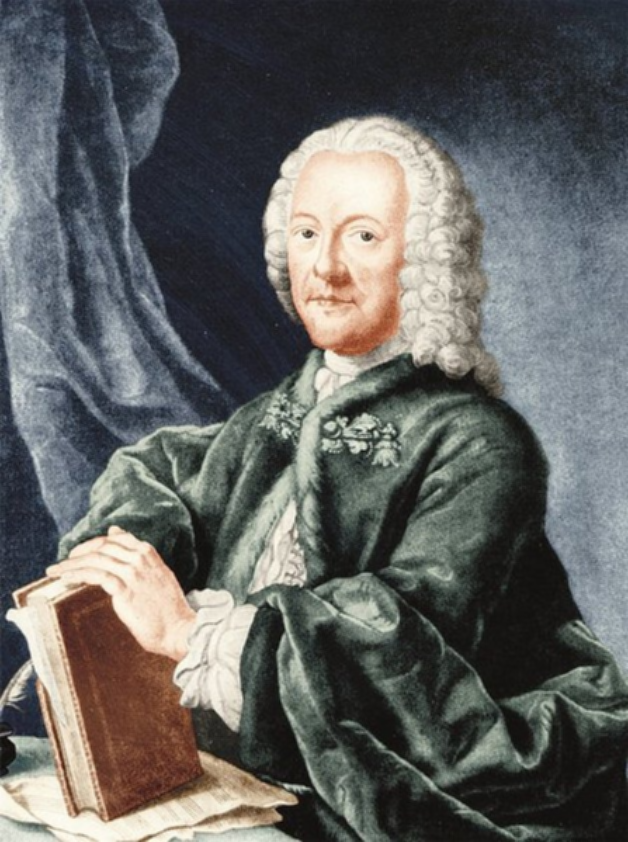
Georg Philipp Telemann

The Paris quartets is a collective designation for two sets of Chamber music compositions, each consisting of six works for flute, violin, viola da gamba (or cello), and continuo, by Georg Philipp Telemann, first published in 1730 and 1738, respectively. Telemann called his two collections Quadri and Nouveaux Quatuors. The collective designation "Paris quartets" was only first bestowed upon them in the second half of the twentieth century by the editors of the Telemann Musikalische Werke, because of their association with Telemann's celebrity visit to Paris in 1737–38. They bear the numbers 43:D1, 43:D3, 43:e1, 43:e4, 43:G1, 43:G4, 43:g1, 43:A1, 43:A3, 43:a2, 43:h1, 43:h2 in the TWV (catalog of Telemann's works).

== History ==
At Michaelmas (29 September) 1737, Telemann finally left Hamburg for a long-delayed journey to Paris, where he had been invited at least seven years earlier by four prominent French musicians: flautist Michel Blavet, violinist Jean-Pierre Guignon, gambist Jean-Baptiste Forqueray, and a cellist/harpsichordist called Prince Édouard, whose precise identity is not known. By 1730 Telemann's fame had spread across Europe, thanks in large part to dissemination of his music in printed form, which had been the main source of appreciation by his French hosts. It was in preparation for this visit (and for these four musicians) that Telemann composed the first set of six Paris quartets, which he published in Hamburg under the (Italian) title Quadri a violino, flauto traversiere, viola da gamba o violoncello, e fondamento: ripartiti in 2. concerti, 2. balletti, 2. suonate in 1730. In anticipation of his arrival the Paris publisher Le Clerc reprinted them in 1736, as Six quatuors a violon, flute, viole ou violoncelle et basse continue. In the meantime, Telemann had composed a second set of six quartets. These, too, were printed by Le Clerc, in 1738 during Telemann's stay in Paris, under the title Nouveaux quatuors en six suites: à une flûte traversiere, un violon, une basse de viole, où violoncel, et basse continuë. All twelve quartets were played during the composer's visit, by the four musicians who had invited him and doubtless accompanied by Telemann himself on the harpsichord. So that Forqueray and Edouard could take turns playing the solo and continuo bass lines, Telemann composed separate versions of the obbligato part, one for viola da gamba and the other for cello—"a cunning diplomatic gesture, which is typical of Telemann's practical mind".

== Analysis ==
=== Quadri ===
Concerto No. 2 in D major, TWV 43:D1
Performed by New Comma Baroque: Peter Lekx (Baroque violin & viola), Leighann Daihl Ragusa (traverso), Phillip W. Serna (bass viol), Emily Jane Katayama (harpsichord)

The six Quadri, for flute, violin, viola da gamba or cello, and basso continuo constitute a réunion des goûts, in that they represent three national styles in pairs of (Italian) concertos in G major and D major, (German) sonatas in A major and G minor), and (French) suites in E minor and B minor. It is possible that this mixture of styles is a deliberate nod toward François Couperin, who in 1724 had published a series of chamber works under the general title le goûts réunis (prefaced by an "Essai de la réunion des Goûts François et Italien"), and two years later a set of four trio sonatas titled Les nations, in which French, Spanish, Imperial, and Piedmontese national traits are represented. The multisectional, quasi-improvisational construction of the first quartet suggests a function as prelude to the rest of the collection, similar to the "sonades" that introduce each suite in Les nations. Despite their designation as "Paris" quartets, "the Quadri are no more 'Parisian' than other Hamburg publications that were known in the French capital".

The combination of instruments chosen by Telemann allows a great deal of flexibility in grouping, since the obbligato gamba part (which is entirely independent of the continuo bass) can function in bass, tenor, or alto register. Although he supplied separate versions for viola da gamba and cello, it appears from the indication "Violoncello, in luogo della Viola" on Telemann's title page and on the separate part for the cello that his first choice was the viola da gamba. The three obbligato instruments participate equally in the thematic working out of the quartets, frequently exhibiting kaleidoscopic textures with rapidly shifting pairings of instruments. Although there is an emphasis on technical virtuosity, Telemann's progressive approach to form applies the emerging galant style that contributed to the quartets' popularity.

=== Nouveaux quatuors ===
The Nouveaux quatuors en six suites, as the title indicates, are all in suite form (in contrast to the first set of quartets). The keys are D major, A minor, G major, B minor, A major, and E minor. This second set maintains and even in some ways surpasses the high standard for quartet writing Telemann had set in the Quadri. Despite the French title and forms, these quartets are more a continuation of the réunion des goûts than a bow to the French style, and this up-to-date feature was an important factor in obtaining for these quartets popular appeal in Paris. Another factor may have been the equal participation of the three obbligato parts, which had a strong cultural resonance in a society fascinated by the art of conversation.

=== Further quartets ===
Two further collections, each of six quartets by Telemann and with scorings that differ at least slightly from the quartets associated with Telemann's 1737–38 visit, were published subsequently in Paris. In approximately 1746 to 1748, Le Clerc issued a collection of Six quatuors ou trios à 2 flûtes traversières ou 2 violons et à 2 violoncells ou 2 bassons, dont le second peut être entierement retranché, ou se joüer sur le clavessin (Six quartets or trios for two flutes or violins and two cellos or bassoon, the second of which may be omitted entirely or replaced with harpsichord). Like the Quadri, these were a reissue of a collection first published in Hamburg in 1733. This was therefore the third collection of Telemann quartets published in Paris. At some time between 1752 and 1760, Le Clerc issued a Quatrième livre de quatuors, flute, violin, viola, and basso continuo. This edition was almost certainly not authorized by the composer, for it consists of rather clumsy arrangements of early works, originally scored entirely for strings. The original versions are found in manuscripts at Darmstadt and Dresden, copied between 1710 and 1735, which are in Telemann's Italianate style of 1709–15.

== Reception ==
Two years after returning to Hamburg, Telemann himself reported on the effect his quartets had in Paris:

The admirable performances of these quartets by Messrs Blavet (transverse flute), Guignon (violin), the younger Forcroy [i.e. Forqueray] (viola da gamba) and Edouard (cello) would be worth describing were it possible for words to be found to do them justice. In short, they won the attention of the ears of the court and the town, and procured for me in a very little time an almost universal renown and increased esteem.

Telemann was famous in his lifetime for the composition of quartets, of which he wrote at least 40. However, only two contemporary writers offer detailed discussion of quartet writing in general, and of Telemann's quartets in particular, Johann Adolph Scheibe and Johann Joachim Quantz.

In the issue for Tuesday, 26 January 1740 of his weekly music magazine, Der Critische Musikus, Scheibe wrote an article explaining that quartet writing presented the composer with special challenges. According to Scheibe, they could be written in the French manner, or in a style unique to themselves; formally, they may be sonatas, or else in concerto form. It seems clear from these remarks that Scheibe had Telemann's Paris quartets in mind, and especially when he observed, "it is generally best to use four different instruments together; above all, a transverse flute, a violin, a viola da gamba and a bass sound best together".

In his Versuch, Quantz seems tacitly to criticise Telemann's later style by praising only the earlier quartets, written before 1734. Upon publication of Quantz's book in 1752, Telemann wrote to the author. Though his letter does not survive, to judge from Quantz's reply he evidently demanded to know why Quantz had referred only to his early, unpublished trios and quartets. Quantz answered that "these very quartets are the ones that first made me personally most clearly aware of the characteristics of good quartets and inspired me some years ago to venture into just this field. Would you blame me if, without slighting the others, I have a special love for these?" It seems apparent from this response as well as from his own quartets that Quantz was not so much thinking of the compositional details of Telemann's works as he was nostalgically remembering his fondness for those pieces he had studied in his youth.

== Editions ==
- Telemann, Georg Philipp. 1730. Quadri a violino, flauto traversiere, viola da gamba o violoncello, e fondamento: ripartiti in 2. concerti, 2. balletti, 2. suonate. Hamburg: Telemann. Reprinted, Shumilov Facsimile Collection SH 01. [Gustavsberg]: Musici Segreti; [Magdeburg]: Edition Walhall, 2004.
- Telemann, Georg Philipp. 1736. Six quatuors a violon, flute, viole ou violoncelle et basse continuë, nouvelle edition, gravée par De Gland, graveur du roy. Paris: Mr. Le Clerc le Cadet, Le Sr Le Clerc, La vieuve Boivin. Reprinted, from a copy in the Library of Congress. Basel: Musica Musica, Mark A. Meadow, 1981.
- Telemann, Georg Philipp. 1738. Nouveaux quatuors en six suites: à une flûte traversiere, un violon, une basse de viole, où violoncel, et basse continuë. Paris: L'auteur, Vater, Boivin, et Le Clerc. Reprinted, from a copy in the Library of Congress. Performers' Facsimiles 98224. New York: Performers' Facsimiles, 1998.
