= Alcyone (opera) =

Opera by Marin Marais

- Opera by Marin Marais
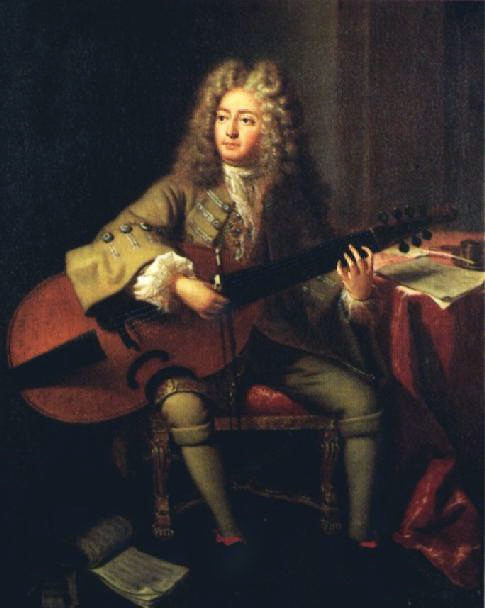
- Portrait of Marin Marais by André Bouys, 1704
- Librettist: Antoine Houdar de la Motte
- Language: French
- Based on: Myth of Alcyone and Ceyx, recounted in Ovid's Metamorphoses
- Premiere: 18 February 1706; Théâtre du Palais-Royal, Paris

Alcyone (or Alcione) is an opera by the French composer Marin Marais. It takes the form of a tragédie en musique in a prologue and five acts. The libretto, by Antoine Houdar de la Motte, is based on the Greek myth of Alcyone and Ceyx as recounted by Ovid in his Metamorphoses. The opera was first performed on 18 February 1706 by the Académie royale de musique at the Théâtre du Palais-Royal in Paris. The score is particularly famous for the storm scene (tempête) in act 4. The "Marche pour les Matelots", from act 3, became popular as a dance tune and is the basis of the Christmas carol "Masters in This Hall".

Having been recorded by Erato in 1990, Alcyone received its first stage production since the composer's death as the first work to appear at the newly refurbished Opéra Comique in Paris on 25 April 2017; directed by Louise Moaty, Jordi Savall conducted Le Concert des Nations, with Lea Desandre in the title role and Marc Mauillon, Cyril Auvity, Lisandro Abadie and Antonio Abete among the cast.

== Roles ==
Roles, voice types, premiere cast
Role	Voice type	Premiere cast, 18 February 1706
Alcyone	soprano	Marie-Louise Desmatins
Ceyx	haute-contre	Marin Boutelou fils
Pelée (Peleus)	baritone	Gabriel-Vincent Thévenard
Sommeil (Sleep)	haute-contre	Pierre Chopelet
Pan/ Phorbas/ Chief sailor	bass	Jean Dun "pére"
Tmole/ High Priest/ Neptune	bass	Charles Hardouin
Phosphore	haute-contre	Robert Lebel
Sailor/Morphée (Morpheus)	taille (baritenor)	Louis Mantienne
Apollon (Apollo)	haute-contre	Jacques Cochereau

== Synopsis ==
Prologue: The mountain god Tmolus decides a musical competition between Pan and Apollo in favour of the latter. Apollo wishes for a return to the reign of peace over the world, symbolised by the Halcyons.

Act 1: Ceyx, King of Trachis, and Alcyone, daughter of Aeolus, are due to be married. Peleus, the best friend of Ceyx, is also in love with Alcyone. The wedding ceremony is disrupted by the magic of Phorbas, whose ancestors once ruled Trachis and who is bent on revenge against Ceyx.

Act 2: Ceyx goes to Phorbas's cave to entreat him to stop his evil spells. But Phorbas tells Ceyx he must journey to the oracle of Apollo on the island of Claros to hear the god's verdict. In reality, this is a plan by Phorbas to bring about the death of Ceyx.

Act 3: Ceyx sets sail from the port of Trachis. Phorbas tells Peleus that he has arranged the voyage so Peleus can be free to woo Alcyone for himself. But Peleus's conscience is troubled when he sees Alcyone faint at the departure of Ceyx.

Act 4: Alcyone goes to the temple of Juno to pray for the safe return of Ceyx. She falls asleep and in a dream conjured up by Sommeil (Sleep) she sees a ship in trouble on a stormy sea.

Act 5: Alcyone is full of foreboding. Peleus confesses his love for her and is so ashamed he offers to commit suicide. Alcyone sees a body washed up on the beach and, believing it is Ceyx, runs herself through with a sword. But Neptune restores the lovers to life and makes them responsible for calming the seas.

== Recordings ==
- Alcione, Jennifer Smith, Gilles Ragon, Philippe Huttenlocher, Les Musiciens du Louvre, conducted by Marc Minkowski (3 CD Erato, 1991)
- Alcione, Suites des Airs à joüer (1706), Le Concert des Nations, conducted by Jordi Savall, (CD Astrée-Auvidis 1994)
- Alcione, Lisandro Abadie (Pan, Phorbas, Marc Mauillon (Pelée), Cyril Auvity (Ceix), Lea Desandre (Alcione) Le Concert des Nations, conducted by Jordi Savall, (3 SACD Alia Vox 2020)
