= 1687 in music =

The year 1687 in music involved some significant events.

== Events ==
- January 30 – Louis XIV's entrance into the city hall inspires André Raison to write his offertory, subtitled "Vive le Roi de Parisiens" ("Long live the King of Parisians").
- During a performance of his own Te Deum, Jean-Baptiste Lully injures his foot with the point of his cane; this results in death from gangrene a few weeks later.
- Jean-Nicolas Francine, Lully's son-in-law, becomes director of the Paris Opera.

== Publications ==
- Angelo Berardi – Documenti armonici
- Le Sieur Danoville – L'Art de toucher le dessus et le basse de violle
- Jean Rosseau – Traité de la viole

== Classical music ==
- John Blow – Ode for New Year's Day
- Dieterich Buxtehude
  - Bedenke Mensch das Ende, BuxWV 9
  - Der Herr ist mit mir, BuxWV 15
  - Domine salvum fac regem, BuxWV 18
  - Eins bitte ich vom Herrn, BuxWV 24
  - Herren vår Gud, BuxWV 40
- Marc-Antoine Charpentier
  - Regina coeli, H.30
  - Sub tuum praesidium, H.352
- Michel Richard Delalande – Super flumina Babylonis, S.13
- Giovanni Antonio Gianettini – L'uomo in bivio
- Elisabeth Jacquet de La Guerre – Pièces de clavecin, Livre 1
- Nicolas Lebègue – Pieces de Clavessin, Livre 2
- Isabella Leonarda
  - Mottetti a 1, 2 e 3 voci con violini, e senza, Op.13
  - Motetti a voce sola, Op.14
- Bernardo Pasquini – I fatti di Mosè nel deserto
- Henry Purcell
  - Sound the Trumpet, Beat the Drum, Z.335
  - Oh Solitude, Z.406
  - Suite in G major, Z.662
  - A Song Tune, ZT.695
- Johann Adam Reincken – Hortus Musicus
- Gregorio Strozzi – Capricci da sonare cembali et organi
- Giovanni Battista degli Antoni
  - Ricercate, Op. 1, one of the earliest examples of music for solo cello
  - Versetti per tutti li tuoni, tanto naturali, Op. 2, one of the largest Italian publications of liturgical organ versets of the era

== Opera ==
- Antonio Draghi – La vendetta dell'onestà
- Giuseppe Fabrini – Lodovico
- Jean-Baptiste Lully, Pascal Collasse – Achille et Polyxène
- Carlo Pallavicino – La Gerusalemme Liberata
- André Danican Philidor – Le Canal de Versailles
- Bernardo Sabadini – Didio Giuliano
- Agostino Steffani – Alarico

== Births ==
- February 1 – Johann Adam Birkenstock, violinist and composer (died 1733)
- June 7 – Gaetano Berenstadt, castrato singer (died 1734)
- July 16 – Paolo Antonio Rolli, librettist (died 1765)
- c. August 26 – Henry Carey, poet, dramatist, songwriter and theatrical composer (suicide 1743)
- October 12 – Sylvius Leopold Weiss, lutenist and composer (died 1750)
- November 23 – Jean Baptiste Senaillé, violinist and composer (died 1730)
- December 5 – Francesco Geminiani, composer (died 1762)
- December 26 – Johann Georg Pisendel, composer (died 1755)
- date unknown
  - Willem de Fesch, musician and composer (died 1761)
  - William Hine, composer (died 1730)
  - Charles King, musician and composer (died 1748)
  - François-Augustin de Paradis de Moncrif, librettist (died 1770)

== Deaths ==
- March 22 – Jean-Baptiste Lully, composer (born 1632)
- March 28 – Constantijn Huygens, Dutch poet and composer (born 1596)
- April 25 – Johannes Caioni, priest, musician and organ repairer
- August 24 – Michael Wise, composer (born c. 1647)
- December 5 – Ercole Bernabei, composer (born 1622)
- date unknown
  - John Gamble, court musician and composer
  - Giovanni Battista Granata, guitarist and composer (born c.1621)
  - Gregorio Strozzi, composer (born 1615)
  - Michael Wise, organist and composer (born 1648)
  - Giovanni Antonio Pandolfi Mealli (1624–1687)
