= Michel Blavet =

French flutist and composer

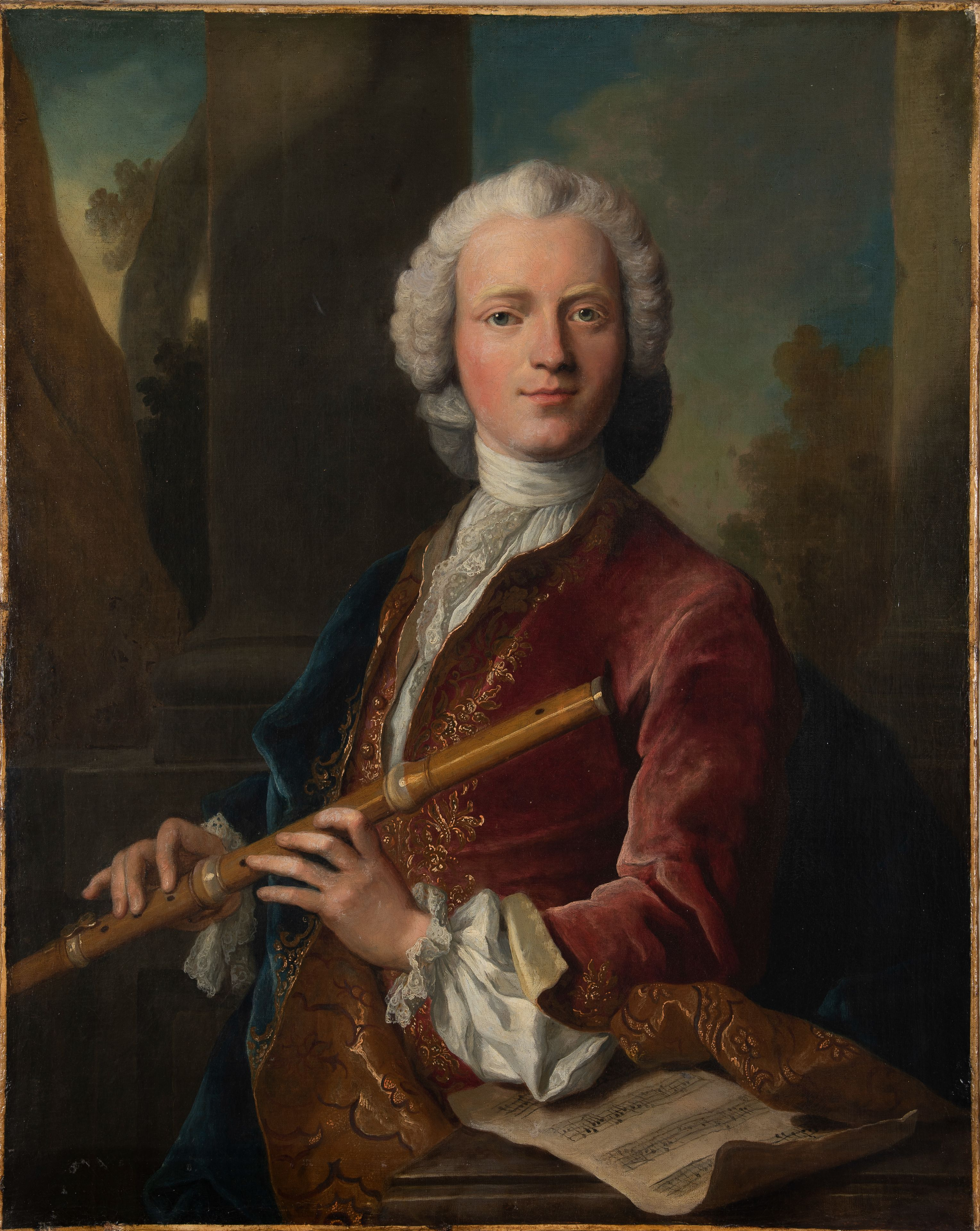
Presumed portrait of Blavet by Henri Millot

Michel Blavet (French: [miʃɛl blavɛ]; March 13, 1700 – October 28, 1768) was a French composer and flute virtuoso. Although Blavet taught himself to play almost every instrument, he specialized in the bassoon and the flute which he held to the left, the opposite of how most flutists hold theirs today.

Quantz wrote of Blavet: "His helpfulness and good way of living caused us to become friends, and I must praise him for the many kindnesses which he showed me in various ways."

== Life ==
Born on March 13, 1700, in Besançon, as the son of wood turner Jean-Baptiste Blavet, (though one source says he was baptised, rather than born on March 13) a profession which he followed for some time, he accidentally became the possessor of a flute and soon became the finest player in France. Blavet was famous for maintaining impeccable intonation, even when he played in difficult keys, and for the beauty of his tone. Voltaire expressed his admiration for his playing and Marpurg spoke of him as a virtuoso of the highest excellence who preserved his innate modesty despite his unbroken popularity.

In 1726 he joined the Duke of Carignan and took part in the newly formed Concert Spirituel for the first time. On 1 October 1728 Louis XV granted Blavet a privilege to publish flute sonatas for a period of six years, but by 1731 he had transferred to the service of Louis, Count of Clermont and became his steward of music. In 1728 he published his first book of flute music, containing six sonatas for two flutes without bass. From 1731 to 1735, he performed at the Concert Spirituel with Jean-Marie Leclair, Jean-Pierre Guignon, Jean-Joseph de Mondonville, Jean-Baptiste Senaillé, and Jacques Aubert.

In 1738, Blavet became the principal flute in Louis XV's personal musical ensemble, the "Musique du Roi", and in 1740 at the Paris Opera orchestra. He played in the quartet (flute – Blavet, violin – Guignon, viola da gamba – Forqueray the younger, cello – Édouard) that played the premiere performance of the Paris quartets by Telemann. Blavet turned down a post in Frederick the Great's court, which Quantz eventually accepted after the pay had been increased significantly. In 1752 Blavet modeled on Italian interludes a French comic opera, Le Jaloux corrigé. He also wrote a march for the Grande-Loge, having joined the Masons under the influence of the Comte de Clermont who was Grand Master of the Order in France. Blavet's three Recueils for two flutes are undated, but internal evidence suggests that they come from the early 1750s. The breathing marks (h, for haliene) indicated in the Recueils and his op. 2 remain an invaluable aid in understanding eighteenth-century French musical phrasing. He died in Paris in 1768.

== Musical works ==
Blavet wrote primarily for the transverse flute, in the so-called 'Italian' as well as the French style. His surviving works include a concerto and three books of sonatas (1740). (Note: A selection of Blavet's sonatas was published in 1908 in New England. Several arrangements have appeared in Blavet's works for the recorder (soprano and alto).) His surviving works are written only in the easiest keys, since he published them for amateurs to play.

=== Compositions ===
Flute Sonata No. 1 in G major
Performed by Albert Tipton (flute) and Mary Norris (piano)

Flute Sonata in B minor
Performed by Alex Murray (flute) and Martha Goldstein (harpsichord)

- Six sonatas for two flutes without bass, Opus 1 (1728)
- Six sonatas for flute and continuo, Op 2 (1732)
  - Nr. 1 in G major L'Henriette
  - Nr. 2 in D minor La Vibray
  - Nr. 3 in e minor La Dherouville
  - Nr. 4 in g minor La Lumagne
  - Nr. 5 in D major La Chauvet
  - Nr. 6 in a minor Le Bouget
- Concerto in A minor for flute and strings (without viola) (1745, 1954 rediscovered). (Note: It has some of the composer's elaborate cadences, sounding over a pedal point.)
- Four operas, of which only Le Jaloux Corrigé (1752) survived.
  - Le jaloux corrigé (1752)
  - Floriane ou la grotte des Spectacles (1752)
  - Les Jeux olympiques (1753)
  - La Fête de Cythère (1753)
- Arrangements and original compositions for two flutes
  - Premier recueil de pièces accomodé pour les flûtes traversières; Deuxième recueil de pièces accomodé pour les flûtes traversières; Troisième recueil de pièces accomodé pour les flûtes traversières. Paris s.d.
