= All the World's Mornings =

1991 novel by Pascal Quignard

- Author: Pascal Quignard
- Original title: Tous les matins du monde
- Translator: James Kirkup
- Language: French
- Genre: Novel
- Publisher: Gallimard
- Publication date: 31 December 1991
- Publication place: France
- English publication date: 1993
- Media type: Print (Paperback)
- ISBN: 2-07-038773-9 (paperback edition)
- OCLC: 30103618

All the World's Mornings (French: Tous les matins du monde) is a 1991 novel by Pascal Quignard. It is a story of the apprenticeship of Marin Marais in the house of the austere, reclusive and mysterious violist, Monsieur de Sainte-Colombe, obsessed with his late wife, and of his romantic entanglements with his master's two daughters, Madeleine and Toinette. The story is taken from an anecdote in the work of Evrard Titon du Tillet. Among the historical facts that the book outlines are Sainte-Colombe's addition of the viola da gamba's seventh and lowest string.

The novel's narration has a contemplative pace, weaving in impressions of melancholy music and still life paintings. Sainte-Colombe is portrayed as a country recluse who eschews court life because of its artificiality.

In the same year as the book was published, the author participated in creating the screen adaptation with director Alain Corneau for the film of the same title.

== See also ==
- Tous les matins du monde, the film of the same name
