= Carl Dolmetsch =

French instrumentalist (1911–1997)

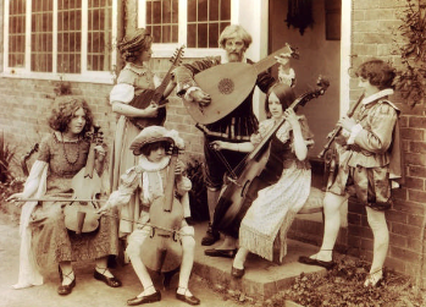
Dolmetsch family c.1919. Left to right: Cécile Dolmetsch, mum Mabel, Carl Dolmetsch, his dad Arnold Dolmetsch, Nathalie and Rudolph

Carl Frederick Dolmetsch (1911–1997) CBE was an Anglo-French virtuoso recorder player. He ran the family musical instrument firm from 1940, helped popularize the use of cheap, plastic recorders in schools after the war, and also commissioned many new works for the recorder from leading composers over a period of 50 years.

== Life and work ==
The son of Arnold Dolmetsch, he was born in Fontenay-sous-Bois on 23 August 1911 but lived in England from 1914. After three years in Hampstead he lived in Haslemere for the rest of his life. Dolmetsch was educated at St George's Wood in Haslemere, before leaving to work alongside his father in the Dolmetsch workshops.

He took part in the first of his father's Haslemere Festivals of Early Music, and from then on throughout his life. Dolmetsch developed and improved the production of recorders at Haslemere. He became an accomplished player and gave his first recital at Wigmore Hall in 1939.

After the death of his father in 1940 he became head of the firm. During the war it produced plastic aircraft parts, and from 1947 Dolmetsch began producing huge numbers of plastic recorders for use in schools. Dolmetsch wasn't the first to introduce plastic recorders: Edgar Hunt (who had founded the Society of Recorder Players with Dolmetsch in 1937) was already doing so during the war. But Dolmetsch further developed the production of injection-moulded Bakelite recorders, matching the exact specifications of premium wooden Dolmetsch models and making high-quality intonation affordable for schools on a global scale. He also followed Hunt in retaining baroque fingering (eschewing the simplified German tuning of pre-war cheap instruments), which helped to maintain acoustic standards and pitch accuracy. In 1954 he was appointed a CBE for his services to music education.

In 1978 the family firm, Arnold Dolmetsch Ltd, was split in two after a boardroom dispute. Carl and his twin daughters Jeanne and Marguerite set up a new independent company, J & M Dolmetsch Ltd of Haslemere, to make wooden recorders and early bows. The firms reunited in 1982 under the new name Dolmetsch Musical Instruments.

Dolmetsch was also pivotal in getting many composers to write pieces for the recorder. He was "the first virtuoso recorder player in England in the twentieth century", and toured annually between 1961 and 1981. He was elected a fellow at both Trinty College of Music and London College of Music. Dolmetsch was elected Master of the Art Workers' Guild in 1989.

Dolmetsch died on 11 July 1997 and is buried in Shottermill Cemetery. His wife Mary Ferguson, who he married in 1937, had died in October the previous year. Their children included the photographer Francois Dolmetsch (b. 1940), as well as twin daughters Jeanne-Marie and Marguerite (b. 1942, Jeanne-Marie died in 2018), and son Richard (1945-1966), all musicians.

== Commissioned works ==
Dolmetsch gave his first Wigmore Hall recital in February 1939, with another later that year. A third followed in 1941. Then, from 1948 until 1989, there was an unbroken series of 42 recitals. At each he presented a new work (sometimes two or more) for the recorder. These included:

- Carl Dolmetsch. Theme and Variations for recorder and harpsichord (1939)
- Lennox Berkeley. Sonatina for treble recorder or flute and piano (1939, repeated 1951)
- Martin Shaw. Sonata in E flat for flute and piano (or recorder and harpsichord) (1941)
- York Bowen. Sonata for treble recorder and piano, Op. 121 (1948)
- Edmund Rubbra. Meditazioni sopra "Coeurs desolés for recorder & harpsichord (1949)
- Herbert Murrill. Sonata for treble recorder and harpsichord (1950)
- Cyril Scott. Aubade for treble recorder and piano (1952)
- Antony Hopkins. Suite for descant (soprano) recorder and piano (1953)
- Norman Fulton. Scottish Suite for treble recorder and piano (1954)
- Edmund Rubbra. Fantasia on a Theme of Machaut, Op. 86. for recorder, string quartet and harpsichord (1955)
- Lennox Berkeley. Concertino, Op. 49, for treble recorder and piano or harpsichord (1956)
- Edmund Rubbra. Cantata Pastorale for high voice, treble recorder, cello and harpsichord or piano, Op. 92 (1957)
- Gordon Jacob. Suite for treble recorder and strings or piano (1958)
- Robert Simpson. Suite for treble recorder and strings (1959)
- Arnold Cooke. Divertimento for alto recorder and strings (1960)
- Georges Migot. Sonatine for recorder (1961)
- Alan Hovhaness. Sextet for recorder, string quartet and harpsichord (1961)
- Edmund Rubbra. Passacaglia sopra (Plusieurs regrets) for treble recorder and harpsichord or piano,, Op. 113 (1962)
- Hans Gál. Concertino for treble recorder and string quartet or piano (1962)
- Gordon Jacob. Variations for treble recorder and harpsichord or piano (1963)
- Ingolf Dahl. Variations on an Air by Couperin for alto recorder or flute and harpsichord or piano (1963 - composed 1956)
- John Gardner. Little Suite in C for treble recorder and piano (1964)
- Arnold Cooke. Sonata for treble recorder, violin, cello, and harpsichord (1965)
- Edmund Rubbra. Sonatina for treble recorder and harpsichord, Op. 128 (1965)
- Nigel Butterley. The White-throated Warbler for sopranino recorder and harpsichord (1966)
- Richard Arnell. Prelude and Variations for recorder and string quartet (1966)
- Hans Gál. Trio-Serenade for treble recorder, violin and cello, Op. 88 (1967)
- John Gardner. Concerto da camera for treble recorder, violin, cello, and harpsichord (1968)
- Joseph Horovitz. Quartetto Concertante for recorder, violin, cello, and harpsichord (1969)
- Francis Chagrin. Preludes for Four, for treble recorder, violin, cello and harpsichord or piano (1970)
- Stephen Dodgson. Warbeck Dances for treble/descant recorder and harpsichord (1971)
- Nicholas Maw. Discourse for treble recorder and harpsichord (1972)
- Walter Bergmann. Song (Pastorella) for soprano and sopranino recorder (1972)
- Martin Dalby. Paginas for recorder and harpsichord (1973)
- Arnold Cooke. Suite for soprano, alto and tenor recorders with or without harpsichord or piano (1973)
- Gordon Jacob. Recorder Quartet, Four Old Tunes (1973)
- William Mathias. Concertino for recorder (or flute), oboe, bassoon and harpsichord or piano (1974)
- Hans Gál. Suite for three recorders and harpsichord (1974)
- Alan Ridout. Sequence for recorder and lute (1975)
- Malcolm Lipkin. Interplay for treble recorder, percussion, viola da gamba and harpsichord (1976)
- Alun Hoddinott. Italian Suite for treble recorder and guitar, Op. 92 (1977)
- Edmund Rubbra. Fantasia on a Chord, Op. 154, for treble recorder, harpsichord and viola da gamba (1978)
- Lennox Berkeley. Una and the Lion, cantata for soprano, treble recorder, harpsichord and viola da gamba (1979)
- Michael Berkeley. American Suite for recorder and bassoon (1980)
- Alan Ridout. Chamber Concerto for recorder and string quartet (1981)
- Donald Swan. Rhapsody from Within for treble recorder and piano (1982)
- Gordon Jacob. Suite for recorder, violin, cello and harpsichord (1983)
- Colin Hand (1929-2015). Concerto Canticö 5 for recorder and strings (1984)
- Michael Short (b. 1937). Sinfonia for recorder and strings (1985)
- Arnold Cooke. Divertimento for alto/soprano recorder, violin, cello and harpsichord (1986)
- Lionel Salter. Air and Dance for recorder and piano (1987)
- Jean Françaix. Quintette for recorder (or flute), 2 violins, cello and harpsichord (1988)
- Alan Ridout. Variations on a Theme by Howells for descant recorder and harpsichord (1989).
