= Antoine Forqueray =

French composer and virtuoso of the viola da gamba

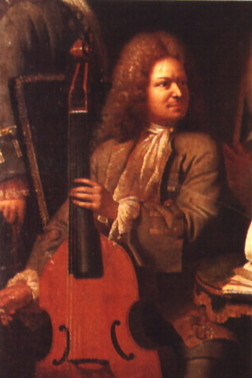
Antoine Forqueray.

Antoine Forqueray (September 1672 – 28 June 1745) was a French composer and virtuoso of the viola da gamba.

Forqueray, born in Paris, was the first in a line of composers which included his sons Jean-Baptiste (1699–1782) and Nicolas Gilles (1703–1761) as well as his brother Michel (1681–1757).

== Career at Versailles ==
Forqueray's exceptional talents as a player led to his performing before Louis XIV at the age of ten. The king was so pleased with him that he arranged for Forqueray to have music lessons at his own expense and then, seven years later, in 1689, named him musicien ordinaire of La chambre du Roy, a position Forqueray held until the end of his life. To supplement his official income he gave lucrative private lessons to members of the royal family and the aristocracy. In Louis XIV's later years the normal routine of concerts at the court of Versailles was augmented by Mme de Maintenon. She arranged almost daily performances in her apartments by such musicians as Robert de Visée (guitar), René Descoteaux (flute), Jean-Baptise Buterne (harpsichord) as well as Forqueray.

== Distinctive style ==
At the time of Forqueray's appointment the most renowned viol player at court was Marin Marais, who was famous for his sweet and gentle musical style. Forqueray in contrast became renowned for his dramatic, striking and brash style. According to Hubert Le Blanc Marais played like an angel, and Forqueray like the devil. The Mercure de France of 1738 chided both Antoine and his son Jean-Baptiste-Antoine for writing pieces 'so difficult that only he and his son can execute them with grace'.

Forqueray's style was so distinctive that three of his near-contemporaries Jean-Philippe Rameau, François Couperin and Jacques Duphly each composed a piece named 'La Forqueray' as a tribute to him.

== Family and later years ==
In 1697 Forqueray married Henriette-Angélique Houssou, daughter of a church organist. Forqueray was often accompanied by his wife on the harpsichord when he played. Their marriage was apparently very unhappy and after several short periods apart, they separated finally in 1710. His relationship with his son Jean Baptiste was just as difficult. He had his son imprisoned in 1719 and exiled by lettre de cachet in 1725.

In 1730, he retired to Mantes-la-Jolie outside Paris, where he continued to draw his salary and died in 1745.

His son Jean Baptiste published his works for the viola da gamba in 1747 (two years after his father's death) together with a version for harpsichord. Although Forqueray's obituary notice indicated that at the time of his death around three hundred pieces written by him still existed, the thirty-two pieces contained in his son's edition are all that survive today.

== Selected recordings ==
Pièces de Clavecin, Blandine Rannou, clavecin. 2 CD Zig-Zag Territoires 2007. Diapason d'Or.

- L'œuvre pour clavecin par Yannick Le Gaillard, Mandala (1994)
- L'intégrale des Pièces de clavecin par Blandine Rannou, 2 CD Zig-Zag Territoires (enregistré en 2007, sorti en 2008) Diapason d'or.
- Works for Harpsichord par Michael Borgstede, 2 CD Brilliant Classics (2011) - Diapason d'or
- Antoine & Jean-Baptiste Forqueray. ou les tourments de l'âme par Michèle Dévérité, Kaori Uemura, Ryo Terakado, Ricardo Rodriguez, Robert Kohnen, [PIAS] CD harmonia mundi (2018)
- Suite en ré mineur, À Deux Violes Esgales, Jonathan Dunford, basse de viole, Sylvia Abramowicz, basse de viole, Nanja Breedjijk, harpe triple, Daphni Kokkoni, clavecin, CD AS musique ASM003 2007
