= Pascal Quignard =

French writer (born 1948)

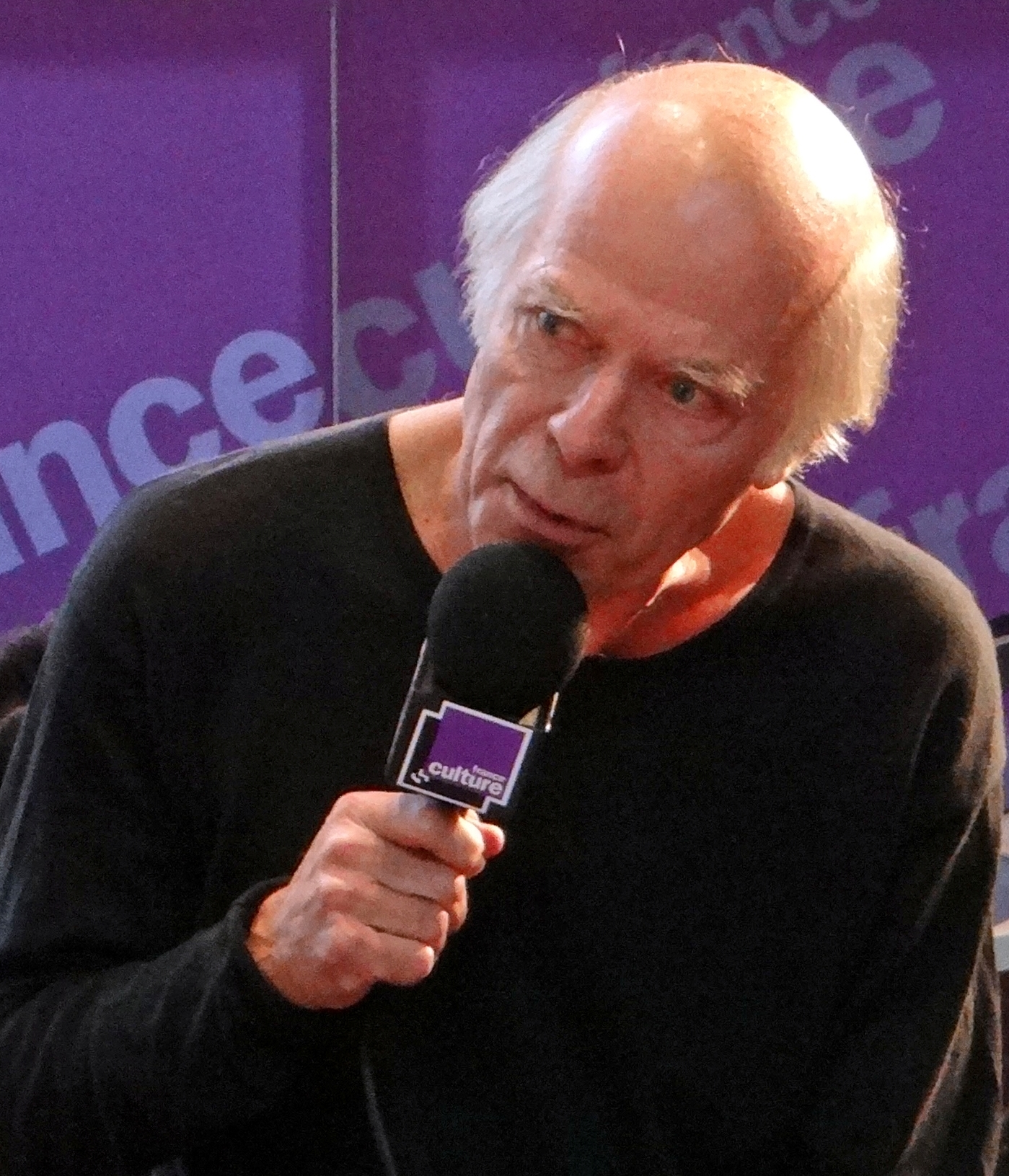
- Quignard in 2013
- Born: 23 April 1948 (age 78); Verneuil-sur-Avre, Eure, France
- Occupation: Writer
- Writing career
- Language: French
- Genres: Fiction, essay

Pascal Quignard (French: [kiɲaʁ]; born 23 April 1948) is a French writer born in Verneuil-sur-Avre, Eure. In 1980 his novel Carus was awarded the Prix des Critiques. In 2002 Les Ombres errantes (The Roving Shadows) won the Prix Goncourt, France's most prestigious literary prize. Terrasse à Rome (A Terrace in Rome), received the French Academy prize in 2000. He also won the 2023 Prix Formentor.

Among Quignard's most commented-upon works are his eighty-four "Little Treatises" (Petits traités), first published in 1990 by Maeght. But his most popular book is probably All the World's Mornings (Tous les matins du monde), about 17th-century viola de gamba player Marin Marais and his teacher, Sainte-Colombe, which was adapted for the screen in 1991, by director Alain Corneau. Quignard wrote the screenplay of the film, in collaboration with Corneau. Tous les matins du monde, starring Jean-Pierre Marielle, Gérard Depardieu and son Guillaume Depardieu, was a tremendous success in France and sold 2 million tickets in the first year. It was subsequently distributed in 31 countries, and released in 1992 in the United States. The soundtrack was certified platinum (500,000 copies) and contributed to musician Jordi Savall’s international celebrity. Quignard has also translated works from the Latin (Porcius Latro), Chinese (Kong-souen Long), and Greek (Lycophron).

== Works ==
=== Novels, novellas, récit ===
- Le Lecteur (Gallimard, 1976)
- Carus (Gallimard, 1979)
- Les Tablettes de buis d’Apronenia Avitia (Gallimard, 1984). On Wooden Tablets: Apronenia Avitia, trans. Bruce X (Burning Deck, 2001)
- Le Salon du Wurtemberg (Gallimard, 1986). The Salon in Württemberg, trans. Barbara Bray (Grove Weidenfeld, 1991)
- Les Escaliers de Chambord (Gallimard, 1989)
- Tous les matins du monde (Gallimard, 1991). All the World's Mornings, trans. James Kirkup (Graywolf Press, 1993)
- L'Amour conjugal (Patrice Trigano, 1994)
- L'Occupation américaine (Seuil, 1994)
- Dernier Royaume (Last Kingdom) series (1997–ongoing):
  1. Les Ombres errantes (Grasset, 2002). The Roving Shadows, trans. Chris Turner (Seagull Books, 2011)
  2. Sur le jadis (Grasset, 2002). The Fount of Time, trans. Chris Turner (Seagull Books, 2021)
  3. Abîmes (Grasset, 2002). Abysses, trans. Chris Turner (Seagull Books, 2015)
  4. Les Paradisiaques (Grasset, 2005). The Paradisiacs, trans. John Taylor (Seagull Books, 2026)
  5. Sordidissimes (Grasset, 2005)
  6. La Barque silencieuse (Le Seuil, 2009). The Silent Crossing, trans. Chris Turner (Seagull Books, 2013)
  7. Les Désarçonnés (Grasset, 2012). The Unsaddled, trans. John Taylor (Seagull Books, 2023)
  8. Vie secrète (Gallimard, 1997)
  9. Mourir de penser (Grasset, 2014). Dying of Thinking, trans. John Taylor (Seagull Books, 2024)
  10. L'Enfant d'Ingolstadt (Grasset, 2018)
  11. L'Homme aux trois lettres (Grasset, 2020)
  12. Les Heures heureuses (Albin Michel, 2023). Happy the Hours, trans. Chris Turner (Hermits United, 2026)
- Terrasse à Rome (Gallimard, 2000). A Terrace in Rome, trans. Douglas Penick and Charles Ré (Wakefield Press, 2016)
- Requiem (Galilée, 2006)
- Villa Amalia (Gallimard, 2006). Villa Amalia, trans. Chris Turner (Seagull Books, 2018)
- Le Petit Cupidon (Galilée, 2006)
- Les Solidarités mystérieuses (Gallimard, 2011). Mysterious Solidarities, trans. Chris Turner (Seagull Books, 2021)
- Les Larmes (Grasset, 2016). The Tears, trans. Chris Turner (Seagull Books, 2023)
- Dans ce jardin qu'on aimait (Grasset, 2017)
- L'Amour, la Mer (Gallimard, 2022)
- Trésor caché (Albin Michel, 2025)

=== Short stories ===
- Éthelrude et Wolframm (Galilée, 2006)
- Le Secret du domaine, illustrations by Jean Garonnaire (Éditions de l’Amitié, 1980). Reprinted in 2006 under the title L'Enfant au visage couleur de la mort
- Triomphe du temps (Galilée, 2006)
- Princesse Vieille Reine (Galilée, 2015)
- Le Chant du marais (Chandeigne, 2016)

=== Essays and other ===
- L'Être du balbutiement (Mercure de France, 1969)
- La Parole de la Délie : essai sur Maurice Scève (Mercure de France, 1974)
- Michel Deguy (Seghers, 1975)
- Sarx (Maeght, 1977). Sarx, trans. Keith Waldrop (Burning Deck Press, 1997)
- Petits traités (Little Treatises) series (1981–90):
  - Petits traités, Book I (Clivages, 1981)
  - Petits traités, Book II (Clivages, 1983)
  - Petits traités, Book III (Clivages, 1984)
  - Petits traités, Books I to VIII (Maeght, 1990)
- Le Vœu de silence: essai sur Louis-René des Forêts (éditions Fata Morgana, 1985)
- Albucius (POL, 1990). Albucius, trans. Bruce Boone (The Lapis Press, 1992)
- Le Sexe et l'Effroi (Gallimard, 1994). Sex and Terror, trans. Chris Turner (Seagull Books, 2011)
- La Haine de la musique (Calmann-Lévy, 1996). The Hatred of Music, trans. Matthew Amos and Fredrik Rönnbäck (Yale University Press, 2016)
- La Nuit sexuelle (Flammarion, 2007). The Sexual Night, trans. Chris Turner (Seagull Books, 2015)
- La Réponse à Lord Chandos (Éditions Galilée, 2020). The Answer to Lord Chandos, trans. Stéphanie Boulard and Timothy Lavenz (Wakefield Press, 2024)

=== Books translated in English ===
- The Salon in Württemberg, trans. Barbara Bray (Grove Weidenfeld, 1991)
- Albucius, trans. Bruce Boone (The Lapis Press, 1992)
- All the World's Mornings, trans. James Kirkup (Graywolf Press, 1993)
- Sarx, trans. Keith Waldrop (Burning Deck Press, 1997)
- On Wooden Tablets: Apronenia Avitia, trans. Bruce X (Burning Deck, 2001)
- The Roving Shadows, trans. Chris Turner (Seagull Books, 2011)
- Sex and Terror, trans. Chris Turner (Seagull Books, 2011)
- The Silent Crossing, trans. Chris Turner (Seagull Books, 2013)
- Abysses, trans. Chris Turner (Seagull Books, 2015)
- The Sexual Night, trans. Chris Turner (Seagull Books, 2015)
- A Terrace in Rome, trans. Douglas Penick and Charles Ré (Wakefield Press, 2016)
- The Hatred of Music, trans. Matthew Amos and Fredrik Rönnbäck (Yale University Press, 2016)
- Villa Amalia, trans. Chris Turner (Seagull Books, 2018)
- Mysterious Solidarities, trans. Chris Turner (Seagull Books, 2021)
- The Fount of Time, trans. Chris Turner (Seagull Books, 2021)
- The Tears, trans. Chris Turner (Seagull Books, 2023)
- The Unsaddled, trans. John Taylor (Seagull Books, 2023)
- Dying of Thinking, trans. John Taylor (Seagull Books, 2024)
- The Answer to Lord Chandos, trans. Stéphanie Boulard and Timothy Lavenz (Wakefield Press, 2024)
- The Paradisiacs, trans. John Taylor (Seagull Books, 2026)
- Happy the Hours, trans. Chris Turner (Hermits United, 2026)

== Awards and honours ==
- 1980: Prix des Critiques, for Carus
- 1991: Prix de la langue française
- 1998: Grand prix de littérature de la SGDL, for Vie secrète
- 1998: Grand prix du roman de la Ville de Paris
- 2000: Grand Prix du roman de l'Académie française, for Terrasse à Rome
- 2000: Prix de la Fondation Prince Pierre de Monaco
- 2002: Prix Goncourt, for Les Ombres errantes
- 2006: Grand prix Jean Giono, for Villa Amalia
- 2023: Prix Formentor for his body of work
