= Sonnerie de Sainte-Geneviève du Mont de Paris =

Sonnerie de Sainte-Geneviève du Mont de Paris "The Bells of St. Genevieve" from La Gamme et Autres Morceaux de Symphonie (1723)
Performed by New Comma Baroque

Sonnerie de Sainte-Geneviève du Mont de Paris "The Bells of St. Genevieve" from La Gamme et Autres Morceaux de Symphonie (1723)
Performed by the Advent Chamber Orchestra with Stephen Balderston (cello)

Sonnerie de Sainte-Geneviève du Mont de Paris, "The Bells of St. Genevieve" in English, is a work by Marin Marais written in 1723 for viol, violin and harpsichord with basso continuo. It can be considered a passacaglia or a chaconne, with a repeating D, F, E bass line. It is perhaps Marais' most famous composition that explores the various techniques of the viol, an instrument he studied as a student of Monsieur de Sainte-Colombe.

The work begins with 4 measures of the bass line played by the continuo and viol, then, on the 5th measure the violin takes over the melody. Throughout the piece, the violin and viol take turns with the melody. Music critics describes the three-note repeating motif as representing the three bells from the abbey of Saint Genevieve.

The viol part is of great difficulty because of Marais's mastery of that instrument. The centerpiece is not the melody, the violin, but the viol. His work can be thought of as something to showcase the violist's skill, although it does not always have the melody.

The piece also exists in a version for solo double bass, having been arranged by Norman Ludwin for Ludwin Music. An electronic version on a Fairlight synthesizer was used in the soundtrack of the 1982 film "Liquid Sky".
