= John Hsu =

John Hsu may refer to:

- John Hsu (musician)
- John Hsu (filmmaker)
