= The Roving Shadows =

- Author: Pascal Quignard
- Original title: Les Ombres errantes
- Language: French
- Publisher: Éditions Grasset
- Publication date: 2002
- Publication place: France
- Pages: 190
- ISBN: 2-246-63741-4

The Roving Shadows (French: Les Ombres errantes) is a 2002 fiction book by the French writer Pascal Quignard. It won the Prix Goncourt. The English edition, translated by Chris Turner, was published in November 2011.

== See also ==
- 2002 in literature
- Contemporary French literature
