= London Baroque =

Chamber orchestra

London Baroque is a chamber orchestra formed in 1978 by Charles Medlam and Ingrid Seifert. Its members are Ingrid Seifert and Richard Gwilt (violins), Charles Medlam (cello & viola da gamba) and Steven Devine (harpsichord and organ). Its repertoire ranges from the late 16th up to late 18th century.

London Baroque is a regular visitor at the festivals of Salzburg, Bath, Beaune, Innsbruck, Utrecht, York, Bachwoche Ansbach and Bachwoche Stuttgart. London Baroque has appeared on television in England, France, Germany, Belgium, Austria, Holland, Spain, Sweden, Poland, Estonia and Japan.

== Recordings and reviews ==
London Baroque's recording releases have been widely acclaimed. Charpentier's instrumental music (H.548, H.504, H.545, H.496), a world premiere in 1986 was well received by the specialised press. Their recording with Emma Kirkby of Handel cantatas was described as "Sympathetic and alert... with some finely poetic playing." (Gramophone, September 2001) and "They have never made a better disc and neither have I heard a superior performance of any Handel trio sonata." (Goldberg, July 2001). Of their release of Vivaldi Op. 1 trio sonatas, a reviewer said "London Baroque bring their customary virtues to these performances, including excellent internal rapport and blend, a richly mined string tone, passion and intensity." (Gramophone, March 2001).
