= Jean Desfontaines =

French composer

Jean Desfontaines (c. 1658 – after 1752) was a French Baroque composer.

Desfontaines was a pupil of Monsieur de Sainte-Colombe. He was a prolific music teacher in Paris, however, it does not seem that he held a public office.

== Works ==
His output includes airs, the cantata Narcisse, the pastorale Le Désespoir de Tircis and sacred music, which consists of 192 works numbered JeD. 1 to JeD. 192. He wrote music on all 150 psalms, a magnificat Anima mea and 41 petits motets on liturgical texts of Neo-Latin poetry.
