= Jonathan Dunford =

American violist

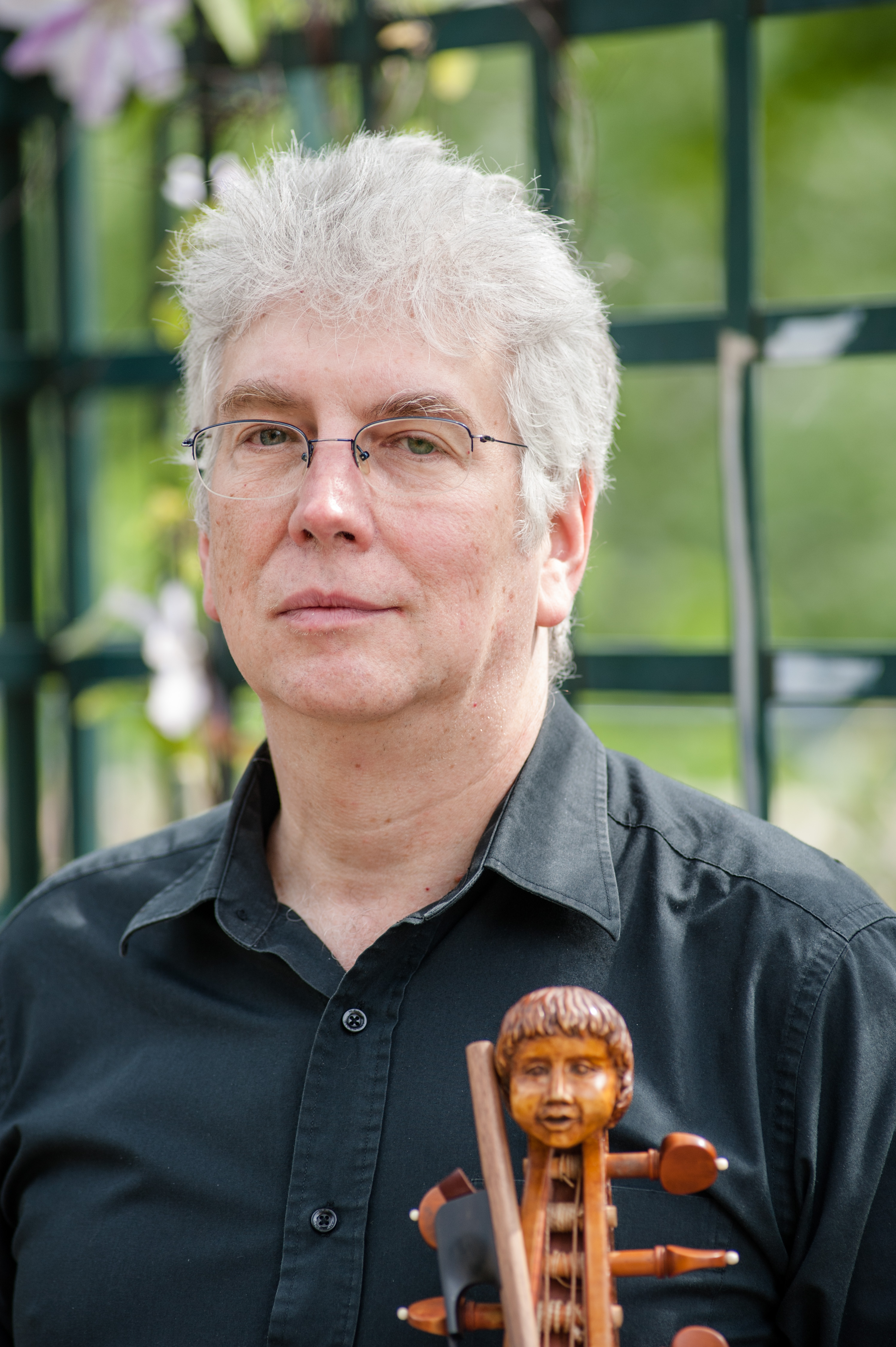
Jonathan Dunford in 2015

Jonathan Dunford (born 30 October 1959 in Trenton, New Jersey) is an American violist specialising in the baroque repertoire.

== Biography ==
After studying the viol at the New England Conservatory of Music in Boston, Dunford was awarded a scholarship in 1980 for further training by Jordi Savall at the Schola Cantorum Basiliensis.

He obtained his mastery of viola da gamba in 1987 in Boston then his State Diploma of Ancient Music in 1989 in France.

Jonathan Dunford has been living in Paris since 1985, is married to the gambist Sylvia Abramowicz and taught at the Conservatoire de Strasbourg between 1990 and 1997 and also at the Conservatoire de Metz. He has been teaching at the Conservatory of Saint-Cloud since 2013.

He has conducted extensive research at the Bibliothèque nationale de France on music for viola da gamba.

In 2004, he was appointed workshop leader for viola da gamba for the data base "Philidor" at the Centre de musique baroque de Versailles. He has published numerous articles on the viola da gamba (Goldberg, l'Œil, record booklets) and regularly participates in radio programs (France Musique, Radio Bleu, etc.) and television programs (Mezzo).

In 2016 he founded his own digital label "Astres Disques".

Jonathan Dunford plays on a bass viola da gamba built in 1741 by Parisian luthier Solomon.

His son Thomas Dunford, born in Paris in 1988, plays the lute and theorbo and participates in recordings and in early music festivals.

== Discography (selection) ==
- 1992: Pièces de Viole en manuscrit (excerpt from Manuscrit 1111 of the Bibliothèque Nationale de Paris) with pieces by Dietrich Stöeffken, Tobias Hume, Daniel Farrant, Thomas Ford, Nicolas Hotman, August Verdufen, Jean Lacquemant (Dubuisson), John Jenkins and several anonymous Germans
- 1996: Le Sieur Dubuisson, music by Jean Lacquemant better known under the name Sieur Dubuisson
- 1998: Suites pour une et trois lyra-violes by William Lawes
- Pièces de Viole en Tablature by De Machy or Demachy
- Suites pour viole seule by Ditrich Stöeffken
- Suites pour viole seule / Concerts à deux violes esgales by Jean de Sainte-Colombe
- 1997: Tombeau pour Mr. de Sainte-Colombe le père Sainte-Colombe le fils Adès (Universal)
- 2000 & 2002: Pièces de viole inédites - Marin Marais Accord-Universal
- 2007: Le Tombeau de Marin Marais AS Productions, Paris (distribution Abeille Musique)
- 2011: Les surprises de l'amour de Rameau, transcriptions de M. Hesse Alpha Productions, Paris distribution Harmonia Mundi
- 2011: Love is the Cause of My Mourning, Scottish tunes for Baroque Guitar and Viola da Gamba Alpha Productions, Paris distribution Harmonia Mundi
- 2011: Bertrand de Bacilly, L'Art D'Orner Le Beau Chant Saphir Productions, Paris
- 2014: Alfonso Ferrabosco, Ayres & Lessons for the Lyra Viol ARION
- 2015: Marin Marais, Suites à Deux Violes (1686) Musica Ficta
- 2015 : Music for the Viol Lyra-Way - Musique inédite de Jenkins et Simpson (uniquement téléchargement) - Astres Disques
- 2016 : Le Sieur de Sainte-Colombe - Suites for Solo Viola da Gamba (uniquement téléchargement) - Astres Disques
- 2016 : Telemann - Fantasies for Solo Viola da Gamba - (uniquement téléchargement) - Astres Disques
- 2016 - Jean-Baptiste Cappus: Pièces de Viole - 1730 - (uniquement téléchargement) - Astres Disques
- 2016 Meditation sur la vie et la mort - Astres Disques
- 2016 Gervise Gerrarde: Paven - Single - Astres Disques
- 2016 Le Sieur de Sainte-Colombe: Le Retour - Single - Astres Disques
- 2017 La Princesse Palatine: Portrait d'encre et de notes - Astres Disques
- 2018 The Best Of: Marin Marais - Charles Hurel - Astres Disques
- 2019 Paris, 1666 - Astres Disques
- 2020 Demachy - Pièces De Viole - 1685 - Astres Disques
- 2020 John Merro's Book: Music for Lyra Viol from 17th Century England - Astres Disques
- 2020 Mr. Marsh's Lyra-Viol Book - Astres Disques
- 2020 Thomas Morley: Fantasies to Two Voices - Astres Disques
- 2021 Louis de Caix d'Hervelois: Sonata No. 3 in B Minor - Astres Disques
- 2021 Marin Marais: Les folies originelles - Single - Astres Disques
- 2021 Sainte-Colombe le fils - Astres Disques

== Bibliography ==
- Jonathan Dunford and Pierre-Gilles Girault. Un portrait du musicien Marin Marais par Jean Dieu de Saint-Jean au musée du château de Blois ("a portrait of the musician Marin Marais by Jean Dieu de Saint-Jean in the musée du château de Blois"). Les cahiers du château et des musées de Blois, no.37, Dec 2006 – June 2007, (p. 15–21).
- Le Mystère Saint-Colombe on Classicalacarte.net
