= Le Sieur de Machy =

French viol player and composer

Machy, known as Le Sieur de Machy (fl. 1655–1700) was a French viol player, composer, and teacher remembered principally for his Pièces de Violle en Musique et en Tablature (1685), a valuable source of information on the performance practices of his time. "The publication of the Pièces de Violle (..) unleashed a veritable polemic or querelle with Jean Rousseau concerning the “true manner of playing the viol”, which had been described by Machy with a wealth of details in the prologue to his work (..)". As a reply to Machy's 1685 prologue, Rousseau in 1688 published Réponce de Monsieur Rousseau. This polemic and a general discussion of Machy was treated by Ng in 2008.

Machy studied with Nicolas Hotman. He resided in Paris from at least 1692. He described himself as the first composer whose viola da gamba works were published. This is not technically correct, as the collection Fantaisies pour les violles by Nicolas Métru had already been published in 1642. These and other earlier pieces were, however, written as duets for treble and bass viol, while Machy, in his Pièces de violle (1685), preferred polyphonic playing for solo gamba in the tradition of Nicolas Hotman, André Maugars and Jean de Sainte-Colombe. The eight surviving suites by Machy are printed half in notation and half in tablature. He preceded these suites with a technical introduction that has high historic value, as it lists the most important ornaments along with the methods of playing those instruments.
