= John Hsu (musician) =

American musician (1931–2018)

John Tseng-Hsin Hsu (April 21, 1931 in Shantou – March 24, 2018 in Chapel Hill, North Carolina) was a viol player, barytonist, cellist, and conductor. He was a leading specialist in French baroque viol music and a professor of music at Cornell University.

== Biography ==
John Hsu was born in Shantou, China. When he was young, he fled the Second Sino-Japanese War with his family, first to Hong Kong, then to Shanghai, where he began his cello studies, with Johann Kraus and Walter Joachim. In 1949, he moved to the United States to attend Carroll University, where he studied with Joseph Schroetter. The following year, he transferred to the New England Conservatory of Music, studying with Albert Zighera and Samuel Mayes. He was a cellist in the Rhode Island Philharmonic and Springfield Symphony orchestras from 1950 to 1953. From 1953 to 1955, he was part of the Handel and Haydn Society and the New England Opera. At the New England Conservatory, he earned undergraduate and master's degrees in 1953 and 1955, respectively, and the Honorary Doctor of Music in 1971.

During his 50-year tenure at Cornell University, Hsu served five years from 1966 to 1971 as chair of the department and was appointed the Old Dominion Foundation Professor in 1976. Through the years he taught lessons in cello and viola da gamba, and courses in music theory, music history and performance practice; conducted the Cornell Collegium Musicum, the Sage Chapel Choir, the Cornell Chamber Orchestra, the Cornell Symphony Orchestra; and was cellist of the Amadé Trio, Cornell's resident ensemble. He founded the Cornell Summer Viol Program in 1970 which from 1972 to 1996 was the longest continuing summer music program devoted to the study of the French solo viola da gamba performing tradition.

Hsu was Artistic Director and Conductor of the Atlanta Baroque Orchestra from 2006 to 2009, and guest conducted The Vivaldi Project in 2009, 2010, and 2014.

His publications include recordings of the works of Charles Dollé, Jacques Morel, and Marin Marais; the first complete recording of the five suites for viola da gamba by Antoine Forqueray, made in 1972; and the six sinfonias for string orchestra (W. 182) by C.P.E. Bach, made with The Vivaldi Project in 2010. His 7-volume edition of Marais' complete instrumental works, published by Broude Brothers Limited, was completed in 2002. He recorded three disks of Haydn's early symphonies with the Apollo Ensemble, a period instrument orchestra that he founded in 1991, one of which was nominated for the 1996 International Cannes Classical Music Award. He made three CD's of Haydn's baryton trios, one of which was chosen Winner in the Early Instrumental category of the Music Retailers Association Annual Award of Excellence in London, 1989. His Handbook of French Baroque Viol Technique was published by Broude Brothers Limited in 1981. He received the Chevalier de l'Ordre des Arts et des Lettres from the government in France in 2001 in recognition of his work with French baroque music.

His memoir, entitled It's All About Music, is available from Amazon. His papers are housed in the Cornell University Department of Manuscripts and Archives.
