= Nicolas Métru =

French organist and composer

Nicolas Métru (c. 1610 in Bar-sur-Aube – 1668 in Paris) was a French organist, viol player, and composer of pieces for viol and airs. From 1642 he was organist at St. Nicolas-des-Champs, then some time later master of music for the Jesuits. He taught Couperin and Lully and was an outstanding viol player.

His first publication - which survives - was a collection of laudatory airs to verse by Guillaume de Baïf, a minor poet but son of Jean-Antoine de Baïf, for the victorious return of Louis XIII to Paris in 1628 after the end of the 14-month siege of Protestant La Rochelle. His third collection of airs also contains laudatory texts, for the marriage of Louis XIV.

His duets for two viols (Paris, 1642) are the first printed example, and therefore probably antedate the duets of Sainte-Colombe. His fantasias for viols, as those of Henry and Moulinié, derive from the air de cour and the dance rather than older styles. His 1642 publication reflects the change in development of the viol in the 1630-1650s with the upper parts being written with the new smaller viols in mind.

== Works, editions and recordings ==
Works

- Recueil des vers du Sr. G. de Baïf, mis en musique par N. Métru, chantez en l'alégresse de l'heureux retour du roy, Paris, 1628
- Fantaisies, a 2 viole, Paris, 1642
- Premier livre d'airs Paris 1646, - lost
- Deuxième livre d’airs, Paris, 1646
- Troisième livre d'airs, Paris, 1661
- Missa ad imitationem moduli Brevis oratio, Paris, 1663
- Contrafacta, 1632

Editions The CMBV have prepared editions of his duets.

Recordings

- Neufiesme Fantaisie on Orpheus, Ensemble L'Amoroso, Sou GuiBalestraccio. Zig Zag, 2008

== Sources ==
Jean-Paul C. Montagnier, The Polyphonic Mass in France, 1600-1780: The Evidence of the Printed Choirbooks, Cambridge: Cambridge University Press, 2017.
