= Charles Dollé =

French viol player and composer

Charles Dollé (fl. 1735 – 1755) was a French viol player and composer. Very little is known about his life. He was active in Paris and was a sought-after teacher of viol. His music, all of which involves the viol in some way, was influenced by Marin Marais (whose death the composer commemorated in a tombeau) and Italian style, which is most prominent in Dollé's late works (although they retain the characteristically French ornamentation).

Dollé's music survives in five printed collections (all published in Paris):

- Sonates en trio pour les violons, flûtes-traversières et violes avec la basse continue, op. 1 (1737)
- Pièces de viole (for bass viol and basso continuo), op. 2 (1737)
- Pièces pour le pardessus de viole (for 1/2 pardessus de viole and basso continuo), op. 3 (1737)
- Sonates, duos & pièces (for 1/2 pardessus de viole/violin/violone/flute and basso continuo, op. 4 (1737)
- Sonates à deux pardessus de viole sans basse, op. 6 (1754)

Another print, Livres troisième, pour le pardessus de viole, tant à cinq qu'à six cordes (op. 5, c. 1749–1750), is lost. The extant music includes character pieces (twenty-five in op. 3, five in op. 4).
