= Suitte d'un Goût Étranger =

Suitte d'un Goût Étranger is a composition for bass viola da gamba and continuo by Marin Marais.

== Origins ==
The Suite in a Strange Style was included in Marin Marais's Livre IV of pieces for viol and continuo, and which also included the pieces for three viols, which Marais referred to in the Avertissement as 'a completely new departure in France.' The first suites in Livre IV are charming and simple and closely resemble Livre III, where Marais had endeavored to present pieces of an easy and accessible nature for the less proficient players. However, these suites are followed immediately by the Suitte d'un Goût Étranger, which is famous for its technical and musical demands.

These pieces have a very French style, which makes the use of the adjective "étranger/foreign" curious. While « Étranger » is usually translated by "foreign", in this case it most likely refers to the word « étrange » "strange, unconventional", because the style of the pieces making up this suite is at the very least unusual for the time, at once innovative, profoundly original and somewhat "foreign" to the usual tastes of the time. These pieces, with sometimes unusual names, make up a rather atypical set, and playing the suite in its entirety allows each of these pieces to be best appreciated in its context.

== Style ==
The suite is remarkable in many aspects. For one, in it Marais did away with conventional forms and structures and instead presented the public with a collection of what are essentially pièces de charactère, a clear departure from his previous suites which were built around the typical dance forms preferred and upheld by his contemporaries. The thirty-three pieces are arranged by keys, but not as separate suites in the traditional sense. Rather, they are a succession of small groups of pieces in thirteen different keys (McDowell 1974, 78). In addition to this formal and structural iconoclasm, the suite is filled with music that is supremely virtuosic, descriptive, and adventurous—both melodically and harmonically (Thompson 1960, 495).

One might expect that, in an effort to 'fill in' Livre IV, Marais inserted some especially difficult or highly favored pieces that he had been saving, and put them all into their own suite. It might also be postulated that Marais was responding to the French penchant for highly descriptive and idiomatic orchestral music—a tradition upheld by the likes of Jean-Philippe Rameau and Jean-Féry Rebel—with virtuosic chamber music, as opposed to his earlier works which mimic the older generation of French Baroque composers.

The Suitte also bears some resemblance to François Couperin's intimate style cultivated in his music for the harpsichord. In any case, the Suitte d'un Goût Étranger with all of its garish flair and supreme elegance, might be viewed as a culmination in French Baroque chamber music.

== Contents ==
1. Marche Tartare (March of the Tartars)
2. Allemande
3. Sarabande
4. La Tartarine (The Tartar Girl)
5. Double (of La Tartarine)
6. Gavotte
7. Feste Champêtre (Rustic Festival)
8. Gigue la Fleselle
9. Rondeau le Bijou (The Jewel)
10. Le Tourbillon (The Whirlwind)
11. L'Uniforme (The Uniform)
12. Suitte (with L'Uniforme)
13. Suitte (with L'Uniforme)
14. L'Ameriquaine (The American)
15. Allemande (Sujet) & Gigue (Basse)—contained in one piece, the soloist plays an Allemande before switching parts with the continuo, transforming it into a Gigue.
16. Allemande L'Asmatique (The Asthmatic)
17. La Tourneuse (The Spinner)
18. Muzette
19. Caprice ou Sonate
20. Le Labyrinthe (The Labyrinth)
21. La Sauterelle (The Grasshopper)
22. La Fougade
23. Allemande La Bizarre
24. La Minaudière (The Affected)
25. Allemande La Singulière
26. L'Arabesque
27. Allemande La Superbe
28. La Rêveuse (The Dreaming Girl)
29. Marche
30. Gigue
31. Pièce Luthée (Piece in a lute style)
32. Gigue La Caustique (The Caustic)
33. Le Badinage (The Banter)
