= Hubert Le Blanc =

Violin player, doctor of law and abbé

Hubert Le Blanc (fl. 1740) was a French viol player, doctor of law and abbé. Strongly regretting that viol playing was falling out of fashion, he wrote the treatise Défense de la basse de viole contre les enterprises du violon et les prétentions du violoncelle, which was published in Amsterdam by Pierre Mortier in 1740.

Those who have written about him are unanimous in considering him an eccentric: his German translator (Erhard, 1951) called him "a somewhat sarcastic old gentleman"; his English translator (Jackson, 1973) said he had a "colorful and eccentric personality"; his only biographer (Fétis, 1863) tells us that when he learned that his treatise was to be published in Amsterdam, he was so transported with joy that he set off immediately (presumably from Paris), attired as he was when he received the news, in bathrobe, slippers, and nightcap. Despite his reputation for eccentricity and his purple prose, larded with mythological allusions, he provides a wealth of eyewitness information about eighteenth-century musical life. The treatise is divided into three parts.

== Dissertation on pièces and sonatas ==
In the first part, Le Blanc associates pièces with the viol, music in the French taste, and musical poetry; he associates sonatas with the violin, music in the Italian taste, and musical prose. He discusses the viol playing of Marin Marais (1656–1728) and Antoine Forqueray (c. 1671-1745) in detail, suggesting that he was old enough to have witnessed their playing in person.

== The viola da gamba vs. the violin ==
The second part, the longest in the treatise, is told in the form of a dialogue between "Sultan Violin, an abortion and a pygmy," and Lady Viol, in which these allegorical characters debate the relative merits of the viol and the violin in the Jardin des Tuilieres prior to a Concert Spirituel in which the violinists Giovanni Battista Somis (1686–1763) and Francesco Geminiani (1687–1762) are to play in the Italian style at a highly publicized concert. This section provides insight into the transition from private music-making by amateurs amongst the nobility and high bourgeoisie to music-making by professionals in a public concert hall.

== Rules for making everything playable on the viol ==
In the third part, Le Blanc offers a solution to the declining popularity of the viol and expanding popularity of the violin, by explaining how to play violin music on the viol. The wealth of detail in this part demonstrates that Le Blanc must have been an expert player himself, and describes contemporary performance practice, both on the viol and on other instruments.
