= Roland Marais =

French viol player and composer

Roland Pierre Marais (c. 1685, Paris – c. 1750, Paris) was a French viol player and composer. He was the son of the composer Marin Marais (1656–1728).

His compositions are written in a similar style to his father's.

== Works ==
- 1711: Nouvelle méthode de musique pour servir d'introduction aux amateurs modernes (lost)
- Règles d'accompagnement pour la basse de viole (The Hague)
- 1735: Premier Livre de Pièces de Viole
- 1738: Deuxième Livre
