= Cécile Dolmetsch =

British instrumentalist (1904–1997)

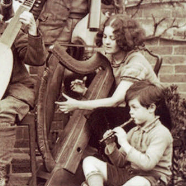
- Cécile Dolmetsch and her son
- Born: 22 March 1904; Dorking, Surrey, England
- Died: 9 August 1997 (aged 93); Guildford, Surrey, England

Cécile Dolmetsch Ward (22 March 1904 – 9 August 1997) was a British pardessus de viole player.

== Biography ==
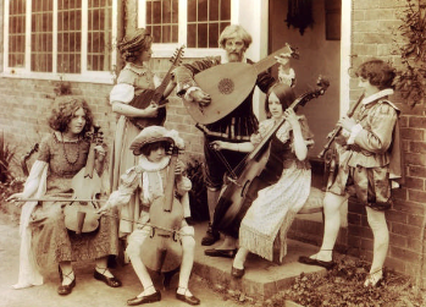
Cécile Dolmetsch, her viol and her family in 1919

Dolmetsch was born in Dorking, on 22 March 1904. She was the first child born to (Eugène) Arnold Dolmetsch and his third wife Mabel (born Johnston). Her family moved abroad shortly after her birth and her father had to make a special trip to collect her in June. They spent seven years in the United States and three years in France where her father worked as a musical instrument maker. She had three siblings and a half-sister but she and her father were estranged. The family would always speak French at home and the family's interest in early musical instruments resulted in a family concert every evening where they would all try different instruments and they would be joined by friends. This led to the formation of a family concert group.

In 1917, the whole family moved to their new home at Haslemere at a house called "Jesses". They were moved as a favour by the French-Canadian army as they had befriended them as fellow francophones. The Haslemere Festival began in 1925 and Cécile would play each year until the 1990s.

Everyone in the family could play several instruments but she was the only one known for her singing. In 1930, she sang John Dowland's "Awake Sweet Love" from 1575 on Columbia's first volume of their "History of Music" edited by Percy Scholes. She was accompanied by a viol and a lute.

In 1948, she was a founder of the Viola da Gamba Society and her sister, Nathalie, served for many years as President. Cecile took over from her when she died in 1989.

She became an advocate for the pardessus de viole which is the descant member of the viol family. In some years she was the only professional musician to play the pardessus de viole. Dolmetsch also used her time to find lost music for the pardessus de viole in French libraries. The music collection she curated included solo compositions by Jean-Baptiste Barrière, Thomas Marc and Caix d'Hervelois.

Dolmetsch died on 9 August 1997, aged 93, in Guildford.
