= Tous les Matins du Monde =

Tous les matins du monde
- Film poster
- Directed by: Alain Corneau
- Written by: Pascal Quignard; Alain Corneau
- Produced by: Jean-Louis Livi
- Starring: Gérard Depardieu; Jean-Pierre Marielle; Anne Brochet
- Cinematography: Yves Angelo
- Edited by: Marie-Josephe Yoyotte
- Music by: Jordi Savall; Sainte-Colombe; Marin Marais
- Distributed by: BAC Films
- Release date: 18 December 1991; (France)
- Running time: 115 minutes
- Country: France
- Language: French
- Box office: $4 million (US/UK)

Marin Marais (1656-1728) – Sonnerie de Sainte-Geneviève du Mont de Paris "The Bells of St. Genevieve" from La Gamme et Autres Morceaux de Symphonie (1723)
Performed by New Comma Baroque (Performed by Jordi Savall in the Film)

Tous les matins du monde (English: "All The Mornings of The World") is a 1991 French film based on the book of the same name by Pascal Quignard. Set during the reign of Louis XIV, the film shows the musician Marin Marais looking back on his young life when he was briefly a pupil of Monsieur de Sainte-Colombe, and features much music of the period, especially that for the viola da gamba. The title of the film comes from words of the narrator in Quignard's novel.

== Background ==
In the same year as the book's release, author Quignard, together with director Alain Corneau, adapted the novel for the film that starred Jean-Pierre Marielle, Gérard Depardieu, Anne Brochet and Guillaume Depardieu.

The film's central character, Marin Marais, was a French composer during the late-17th and early-18th centuries who wrote for the viol (viola da gamba), of which he was a master. The story revolves around his life as a musician and his relationship with his mentor Monsieur de Sainte-Colombe and Sainte-Colombe's daughters. The ageing Marais, played by Gérard Depardieu, narrates the story, while Depardieu's son Guillaume Depardieu plays the young Marais. The haunting sound of his instrument, the viol, here played by Jordi Savall, is heard throughout the film and plays a major role in setting the mood. The story is based on historical characters. Although fictional, it generally respects what little is known about the lives of the characters and the worlds in which they lived. The film was shot mainly at the Château Bodeau in Rougnat. The film credits the scenes set in the salon of Louis XV as having been filmed in the Golden Gallery (Galerie dorée) of the Banque de France in Paris.

Described as a "crossover movie" with the music integrated into the story-line, Derek Malcolm saw Marielle's performance as "matching the music note for note".

== Synopsis ==
Aging court composer Marin Marais recalls his former master, the unequalled violist and composer Monsieur de Sainte-Colombe. After the death of his wife, Sainte-Colombe buries himself in his music, secluding himself in a cabin in his garden in order to perfect the art of viol playing and to indulge in visions of his dead wife. Sainte-Colombe is a stern father and brings up his two daughters on his own, teaching them to be musicians, and playing in a consort with them for local noble audiences. His reputation reaches the court of Louis XIV and the king sends an envoy, Caignet, to request him to play at the Palace of Versailles. Sainte-Colombe curtly dismisses the envoy. Offended, the King ensures that very few attend concerts by Sainte-Colombe and his daughters.

Some years later, 17-year-old Marin Marais visits Sainte-Colombe, seeking to learn from the master. Marais reveals that he was once a choirboy at the Louvre Palace before losing his position due to voice change, which resonates with Sainte-Colombe and convinces him to take Marais in as a student. After a short time, Sainte-Colombe sees no musical merit in the young man and sends him away, refusing to teach him. Madeleine, the elder daughter, is saddened as she has fallen in love with Marais, and the two begin a relationship. She teaches Marais what her father has taught her and allows him to listen in secret to her father playing, which infuriates Sainte-Colombe. During this time, Marais is hired to be a court musician at Versailles, and he gradually grows indifferent to Sainte-Colombe's teachings.

Sainte-Colombe continues to refine his mastery of the viol, and is visited by visions of his late wife with whom he imagines walking and speaking. One day, Marais leaves Madeleine to chase his career at Versailles, and she becomes pregnant and gives birth to a still-born child. Life goes on; Marais marries another woman, and Madeleine's younger sister marries and has five children. Later, Madeleine falls gravely ill. Sainte-Colombe calls Marais to his house where the dying Madeleine asks to hear her former lover play a piece he wrote for her: La rêveuse or The Dreaming Girl. After Marais leaves, an enraged and broken Madeleine hangs herself with the ribbons of a pair of shoes, a gift Marais had given her.

Years later, a renowned Marais returns to Sainte-Colombe, seeking purpose in his music and recognizing his past faults with the Sainte-Colombe family. He requests one final lesson with his old master, who tells Marais he considers it his first. As Marais accompanies Sainte-Colombe during their playthrough of his unpublished opus Tombeau des regrets or Tomb of Sorrows, Sainte-Colombe finally recognises Marais's musicianship.

The story cuts back to the present day, where a vision of Sainte-Colombe appears in front of Marais. The movie ends with a redeemed Marais playing La rêveuse in honor of his late master.

== Cast ==
- Gérard Depardieu as Marin Marais
- Jean-Pierre Marielle as Monsieur de Sainte-Colombe
- Anne Brochet as Madeleine
- Guillaume Depardieu as Young Marin Marais
- Carole Richert as Toinette
- Michel Bouquet as Lubin Baugin
- Jean-Claude Dreyfus as Abbe Mathieu
- Yves Gasc as Gabriel Caignet
- Yves Lambrecht as Charbonnières
- Jean-Marie Poirier as Monsieur de Bures
- Myriam Boyer as Guignotte
- Caroline Silhol as (the ghost of) Madame de Sainte-Colombe

== Music ==
As listed in the film's credits, the music heard includes the following:

- Sainte Colombe: Les pleurs; Gavotte du tendre; Le retour
- Marin Marais: Improvisation sur les Folies d'Espagne; L'arabesque; Le Badinage; La rêveuse
- Jean-Baptiste Lully: Marche pour la cérémonie des Turcs
- François Couperin: Troisième leçon de Ténèbres
- Savall: Prélude pour Monsieur Vauquelin; Une jeune fillette, d’après une mélodie populaire; Fantaisie en mi mineur, d’après un anonyme du XVIIème

Apart from Savall, the musicians are Montserrat Figueras and Mari-Cristina Kiehr (sopranos), Christophe Coin and Jérôme Hantaï (viola da gamba), Rolf Lislevand (theorbo) and Pierre Hantaï (harpsichord and organ).

== Reception ==
The film grossed $3,089,497 in the United States and Canada. In the United Kingdom it grossed £793,748 ($1.2 million).

On review aggregator website Rotten Tomatoes, the film holds an approval rating of 91% based on 11 reviews, with an average rating of 7.5/10.

== Awards and nominations ==
- César Awards (France)
  - Won: Best Actress – Supporting Role (Anne Brochet)
  - Won: Best Cinematography (Yves Angelo)
  - Won: Best Costume Design (Corinne Jorry)
  - Won: Best Director (Alain Corneau)
  - Won: Best Film
  - Won: Best Music (Jordi Savall)
  - Won: Best Sound (Anne Le Campion, Pierre Gamet, Gérard Lamps and Pierre Verany)
  - Nominated: Best Actor – Leading Role (Jean-Pierre Marielle)
  - Nominated: Best Editing (Marie-Josèphe Yoyotte)
  - Nominated: Best Original Screenplay or Adaptation (Alain Corneau and Pascal Quignard)
  - Nominated: Most Promising Actor (Guillaume Depardieu)
- 42nd Berlin International Film Festival (Germany)
  - Official selection / Nominated: Golden Bear (Alain Corneau)
- Golden Globe Awards (USA)
  - Nominated: 1993 Best Foreign Language Film
- Louis Delluc Prize (France)
  - Won: Best Film
- National Board of Review (USA)
  - Won: Top Foreign Films
- Turkish Film Critics Association (Turkey)
  - Nominated: Best Foreign Film (3rd Place)
- Italian National Syndicate of Film Journalists (Italy)
  - Nominated: European Silver Ribbon
