= Jean Lacquemant =

French composer

Jean Lacquemant or Jean Lacman, also known as Dubuisson or du Buisson (1622 or 1623 – 1680 or 1681) was a French composer of Baroque music.

== Life ==
Lacquemand was born in Picardie. What little is known about him is due to Jonathan Dunford who showed that Jean Lacquemant and DuBuisson would be the same composer. Moreover, the name or nickname Du Buisson seems to be that of several French musicians of the 16th, 17th and 18th centuries; it is mostly unknown if they are related.

== Works ==
Dubuisson composed at least 111 pieces. They are all composed for the viola da gamba alone. The known works are contained in six manuscripts, held in libraries in Europe and the United States.
