= Lisandro Abadie =

Argentine bass-baritone

Lisandro Abadie (born 28 July 1974) is an Argentine bass-baritone. He studied in Switzerland, initially in Basel at the Schola Cantorum (music diploma in 2001) and subsequently at the Music School of Lucerne University, graduating with a solo-singing diploma in 2005 and winning the Edwin Fischer Memorial Prize in 2006.

He has performed under conductors such as William Christie, Facundo Agudin, Laurence Cummings, Václav Luks, Anthony Rooley or Hervé Niquet, in concert, on stage and in recordings, and has sung works by Mozart, Bach, Purcell, Händel, Marais, Monteverdi and Brahms. He has also sung in Bach's St Matthew and St John Passions.
