= Jean-Baptiste Barrière =

French cellist and composer (1707–1747)

Jean-Baptiste Barrière (2 May 1707 – 6 June 1747) was a French cellist and composer. He was born in Bordeaux, Gascony and died in Paris, at 40 years of age.

== Musical career ==
Barrière first studied the viol, and published a set of viol sonatas. In due course however he became a skilled cellist during a period when the cello was gaining popularity over the viol in France, and later came to completely replace it, as indeed had already happened in Italy some 40 years prior. He became one of the best known virtuoso cellists of his time.

In 1731 he went to Paris, and entered the Académie Royale de Musique (also known as the Opera), with an annual salary of 445 livres. He was accorded special privileges by King Louis XV at Fontainebleau, on 22 October 1733 for six years, to compose and publish several sonatas and other instrumental works. One of his most famous pupils was the Count of Guergorlay, Seigneur of Trousily. After his first book Livre I - Sonates pour violoncelle et basse continue was a success, in November 1733, he published a second edition of it in 1740. His second book, Livre II, was published around 1735.

He went to Italy in 1736 to study with the well-known Italian cellist Francesco Alborea, known as Franciscello, who during that time seems to have also been employed in Vienna from 1726 until 1739. He undertook a further long tour in Italy in April 1737 and returned to Paris in summer of 1738, to appear at the renowned Concert Spirituel on 15 August and 8 September where he impressed his audience with "grand precision", according to the local press. In 1739, a new 12-year privilege was granted to him at Versailles, and registered on 5 January 1740. In that year he published his Livre III, and other works followed suit the following year. He died at a relatively young age of 40 years, at the pinnacle of his creativity.

Barrière rise to popularity a few years after his death. Pierre-Louis Daquin de Chateau-Lyon describe him as: the famous Barrière, deceased only recently, possessed all that one can desire...few could perform as well as he.

== Style ==
His works are best known for their sensitivity and fine tonality, their emotional resonance and deep sonority. Several of his works are quite demanding in terms of technical performance, especially in terms of left and right hand coordination, and with complicated fingerings and frequent complex bowing techniques. Much subtlety is required to achieve virtuosity in the performance of several of his pieces, for while he assimilated elements of Italian style, there is also a rich French flavour in his musical discourse and its subtlety.

== Compositions ==
- Livre I de sonates pour violoncelle et basse continue (1733 Paris, dedicated to Count Guergolay, Seigneur of Trousily)
- Livre II de sonates pour violoncelle et la basse continue (1735 Paris, dedicated to Madame Jourdain)
- Livre III de sonates pour violoncelle et la basse continue (1739 Paris)
- Livre IV de sonates pour violoncelle et la basse continue (1740 Paris)
- Livre V Sonates pour le Pardessus de viole avec la Basse Continue
- Livre VI Sonates et Pièces pour le Clavecin (Harpsichord Sonatas)
