= Jean-Baptiste Forqueray =

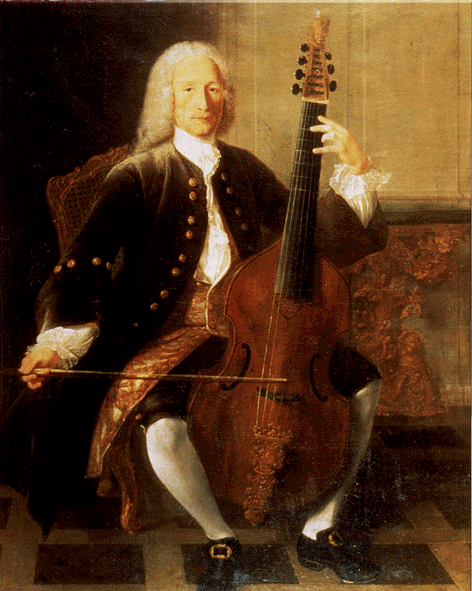
Jean-Baptiste Forqueray

Jean-Baptiste Forqueray (3 April 1699 – 28 June 1782), the son of Antoine Forqueray, was a player of the viol and a composer.

Forqueray was born in Paris. He is most famous today for his 1747 publication of twenty-nine pieces for viol and continuo which he attributed to his father (except for three, for which he himself took credit). In the avertissement he states that he was responsible for the bass line (thus the figures as well) and the viol fingerings. Stylistically, they are very much influenced by Italian music and belong to the generation of Jean-Marie Leclair (1697–1764) and Jean-Pierre Guignon (1702–1774). Modern violists regard these Pieces de viole as the most virtuosic music for the instrument. Paolo Pandolfo and Lorenz Duftschmid have both recorded the complete publication.

Forqueray published the same pieces for harpsichord, possibly in arrangements made by his wife Marie-Rose, in 1749 (ed. Colin Tilney, Paris, 1970) but remarkably did not transpose any of the music, so the melodies lie relatively low in the range of the harpsichord.

Forqueray's pupils included Louis XV's daughter Princesse Henriette-Anne and the future King Frederick William II of Prussia. Forqueray was married twice: to Jeanne Nolson (maternal aunt of Anne-Jeanne Boucon, wife of Jean Joseph Cassanea de Mondonville) on 29 July 1732 and, after her death, to the harpsichordist Marie-Rose Dubois on 13 March 1740 He died in Paris.

== Issue ==
Forqueray had two children with Marie-Rose Dubois.

- Jean-Baptiste Forqueray
- Marie Forqueray

== Selected recordings ==
Pièces de clavecin, Michael Borgstede, clavecin. 2 CD Brilliant Classics 2008.
