= Le Sieur Danoville =

17th-century French musician and teacher

Le Sieur Danoville (fl. late 17th century) was a French gambist and instrumental teacher.

He described himself as a disciple of Monsieur de Sainte-Colombe. In Paris in 1687, he published the book L'Art de toucher le dessus et le basse de violle about playing on viola da gamba. This concise work of 47 pages was written only for self-study. It comprises four parts, in which the attitude of the viol, the notation and the fingerboard in notation and tablature, the decorations and finally bowing are explained. Unlike Jean Rousseau's Traité de la Viole, which appeared in the same year and won extraordinary popularity, Danoville's textbook did not include an historical and aesthetic chapter, but was limited only to the technical instructions.
