= André Bouys =

French painter (c.1656–1740)

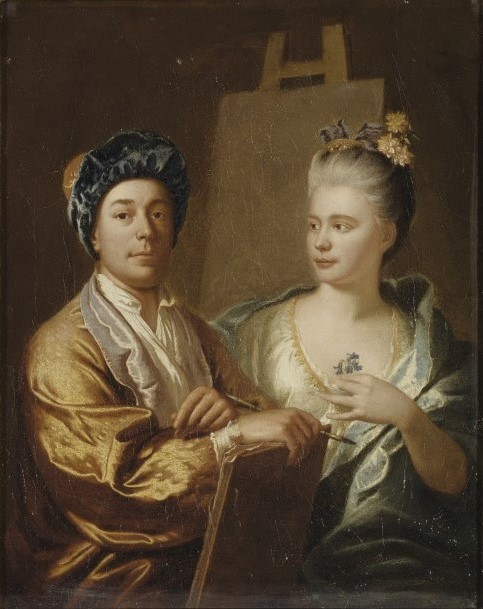
Self-portrait with his first wife Marie-Anne Rousseau (1713)

André Bouys (c. 1656 – 1740) was a French portrait painter and mezzotint engraver.

Born at Hyères, Provence in about c. 1656, Bouys studied under François de Troy, and acquired sufficient reputation to gain admission into the Académie royale de peinture et de sculpture in 1688, when he presented a portrait of the painter Charles de La Fosse, now at Versailles, where there are likewise two portraits of himself, one of them representing also his first wife. He died in Paris, in 1740.
