= Pardessus de viole =

Highest-pitched viol instrument

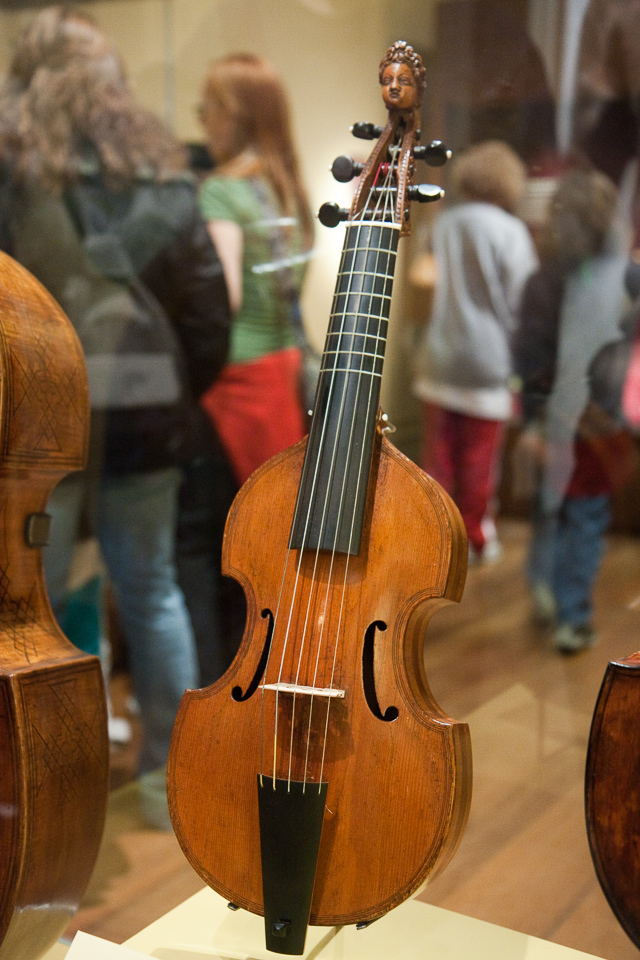
Pardessus de viole

The pardessus de viole is the highest-pitched member of the viol family of instruments. It is a bowed string instrument with either five or six strings and a fretted neck. The pardessus first appeared in the early 18th century, and was commonly played by women, particularly in French-speaking countries.

== Description ==
The pardessus de viole is the smallest of the viol family. Its size is similar to the violin's, and its range is correspondingly similar. The strings are made of gut (like on any bowed string instrument until the 1970s) and the top string was tuned to g'', a fourth higher than the top string of the treble viol. Like the treble viol, the pardessus de viole was almost never used to play accompaniment chords, but was always a melody instrument. When played, it is played upright on the lap with a bow.

Unlike the treble viol and other viol instruments, the pardessus usually has only five strings. The five string pardessus is tuned in fifths and fourths (g, d', a', d'', g''), while the slightly earlier six stringed pardessus is tuned like other viols in fourths with a third (g, c', e', a', d'', g''). Notice, however, that the third is between the fourth and fifth strings (rather than between the third and fourth as on other six-string viols), so that the lowest five strings of the six-string pardessus are the same as the highest six strings of the treble viol.

== History ==
The pardessus de viole was invented around the year 1700. Violins had begun emerging in Italy, and the pardessus was developed to allow people accustomed to viols to play violin music. With a sound more reminiscent of the viol to audiences unaccustomed to the sound of the violin, musicologist Annette Otterstedt has characterized the pardessus as a hybrid between viols and violins.

The pardessus was often played by women, as the method of holding the pardessus in one's lap was considered more lady-like than holding a violin on the shoulder. The pardessus was most popular in French-speaking countries, but by 1770 it was starting to disappear from the landscape as viols generally were being eclipsed by the louder stringed instruments of the violin family.

Cecile Dolmetsch became an advocate for the instrument. Some years she may have been the only professional musician to play the pardessus de viole. Dolmetsch also used her time to find lost music for the pardessus de viole in French libraries. The music collection she curated included solo compositions by Jean-Baptiste Barrière, Thomas Marc and Caix d'Hervelois.
