= Rudolph Dolmetsch =

British instrumentalist, conductor and composer

Rudolph Arnold Dolmetsch (8 November 1906 – 7 December 1942) was an American-born British instrumentalist, conductor and composer, one of the Dolmetsch family of musicians.

== Biography ==
Dolmetsch was born on 8 November 1906, in Cambridge, Massachusetts, the son of French-born Arnold Dolmetsch and his third wife Mabel Johnston. In 1911, at the age of four, he travelled with his family to France, and in 1914 the family moved again to England, settling in Haslemere, Surrey. His musical talent first became evident in Paris, when he played the spinet in public, aged five. By age 14, he had formed a local orchestra in Haslemere.

In 1929, he married one of his viola da gamba pupils, Millicent Wheaton. They lived at Pinewood, Old Haslemere Road in Haslemere. Together they toured, performed and broadcast recitals for viola da gamba and harpsichord, making a number of recordings. But unlike most of his family Rudolph Dolmetsch was interested in modern music - conducting and composing - as well as in early music for traditional instruments. He studied conducting with Constant Lambert and Adrian Boult at the Royal College of Music and submitted his orchestral composition Spring Tidings to the BBC. It was broadcast in 1936 with the composer conducting.

He formed his own chamber orchestra (leader Olive Zorian) and conducted a contingent of the London Symphony Orchestra at the Wigmore Hall on 12 November 1938, performing works by Delius, Grieg, Haydn, Kodaly and Sibelius, which was well received. Other London orchestral concerts followed, the last in February 1940. Dolmetsch also wrote a book on conducting which was published in 1942.

Once war was declared Dolmetsch was called up for active service as a gunner in the Royal Artillery. In 1941, while at an anti-aircraft station in Newquay, he put on a series of local music recitals. But at the end of 1942 he was appointed Regimental Bandmaster and posted overseas. He was reported missing on 7 December 1942, aged 36, when his ship, the SS Ceramic, was torpedoed in the Atlantic Ocean.

== Legacy ==
When his wife Millicent died in July 1998 she bequeathed his manuscripts to the Royal College of Music. His Concerto for clarinet, harp and orchestra (1939) was revived and recorded in 2019 revealing the use of neo-baroque elements in his work.

== List of works ==
- Caprice for solo viola da gamba (1929)
- Symphony No. 1 in D minor (1932)
- Sinfonietta for orchestra (1933)
- Ground and Caprice for orchestra (1934)
- Spring Tidings for orchestra (1934)
- Symphony No. 2 in B flat (1936)
- Pastoral Rhapsody for orchestra (1937)
- Chinese Caprice, a fantasy on Chinese folk tunes for orchestra (1939)
- Concerto for clarinet, harp and orchestra (1939)
- Songs of Flight, for voice and piano (1939)
- Concerto for viola da gamba and small orchestra (1941)
- Symphony (two movements, conceived as a completion of Borodin's Third Symphony in A (1940-42)
- Violin Concerto (1942)
- Innisfallen Suite for military band (date unknown)
