= Jean Rousseau (violist) =

French musician and writer (1644–1699)

Jean Rousseau (1 October 1644 – 1 June 1699) was a French viol player, theorist, composer, and author remembered principally for his Traité de la viole (1687), a valuable source of information on the performance practices of his time, as well as on techniques used in the construction of viols (Green 2001).

Rousseau was a pupil of Sainte Colombe for just one month, as the culmination of three years' study of the viol, and later dedicated his Traité to him. In that work, Rousseau defended Sainte Colombe's innovations in left-hand technique, and systematically refuted the attacks made by Le Sieur de Machy in the preface to his Pièces de violle (1685) (Green 2001).
