= Jean-Pierre Guignon =

Franco-Italian composer

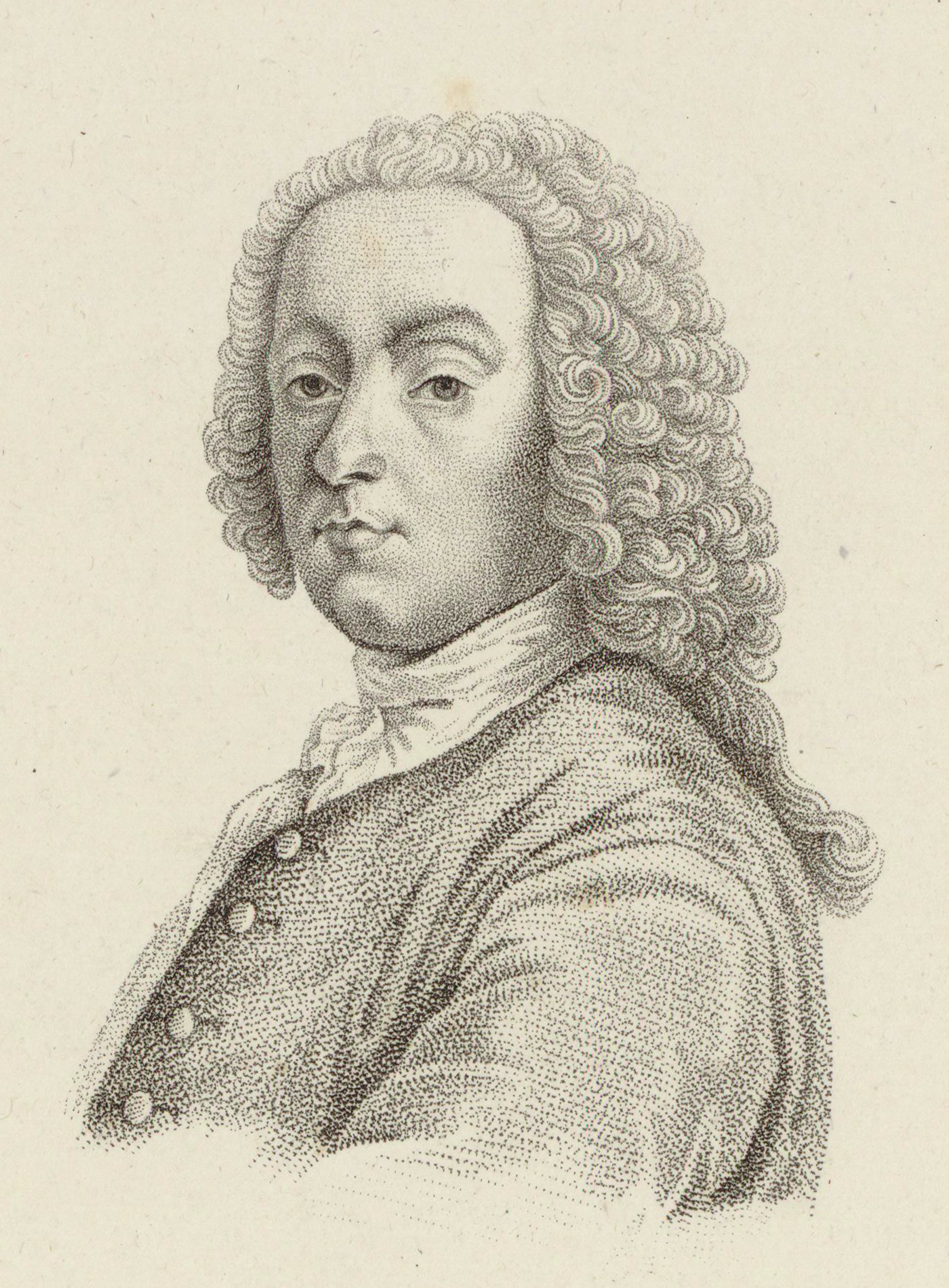
Jean-Pierre Guignon

Jean-Pierre Guignon, né Giovanni Pietro Ghignone (10 February 1702 – 30 January 1774) was an 18th-century Franco-Italian composer and violinist.

== Life ==
Born in Turin, Guignon was the son of a merchant from this city and a disciple of Giovanni Battista Somis. He gave his first performance in Paris in 1725. He became a musician in the chapel of the Prince of Savoie-Carignan in 1730, a position he retained for about 20 years. At the same time, he was admired by the queen and also entered the royal chapel in 1733, where he remained until his pension in 1762.

His merits as a violinist earned him the nickname of "Roy des violonistes", i.e. director of the ménestrandise, a title which was then in disuse and which would be deleted after him. The performances of his own concertos and those of the Venetian master Antonio Vivaldi at the Concert Spirituel were received with great success.

A viola da gamba piece and a solo harpsichord piece by Antoine Forqueray bears his name: La Guignon, published in 1747 by Forqueray's son Jean-Baptiste. However, the similarity of age between Guignon and Jean-Baptiste may indicate that Jean-Baptiste actually wrote the pieces, and published them in his father's name.

== Royal Maître des Ménétriers ==
In 1741, king Louis XV granted him French nationality and the title of "Royal Master of the Menetriers". Guignon thus supervised the singers and dancers of the kingdom, officially becoming the first violin of the time.

Guignon died in Versailles aged 71.

== Selected works ==
- 18 duets for two violins (Op. II, III and VII),
- 17 violin sonatas with basso continuo (Op. I and VI)
- 1 sonata for transverse flute with basso continuo (Op. I No 8)
- 12 trio sonatas (Op. IV and V)
- His violin concertos, masses and other compositions were not printed.
