= Nicolas Hotman =

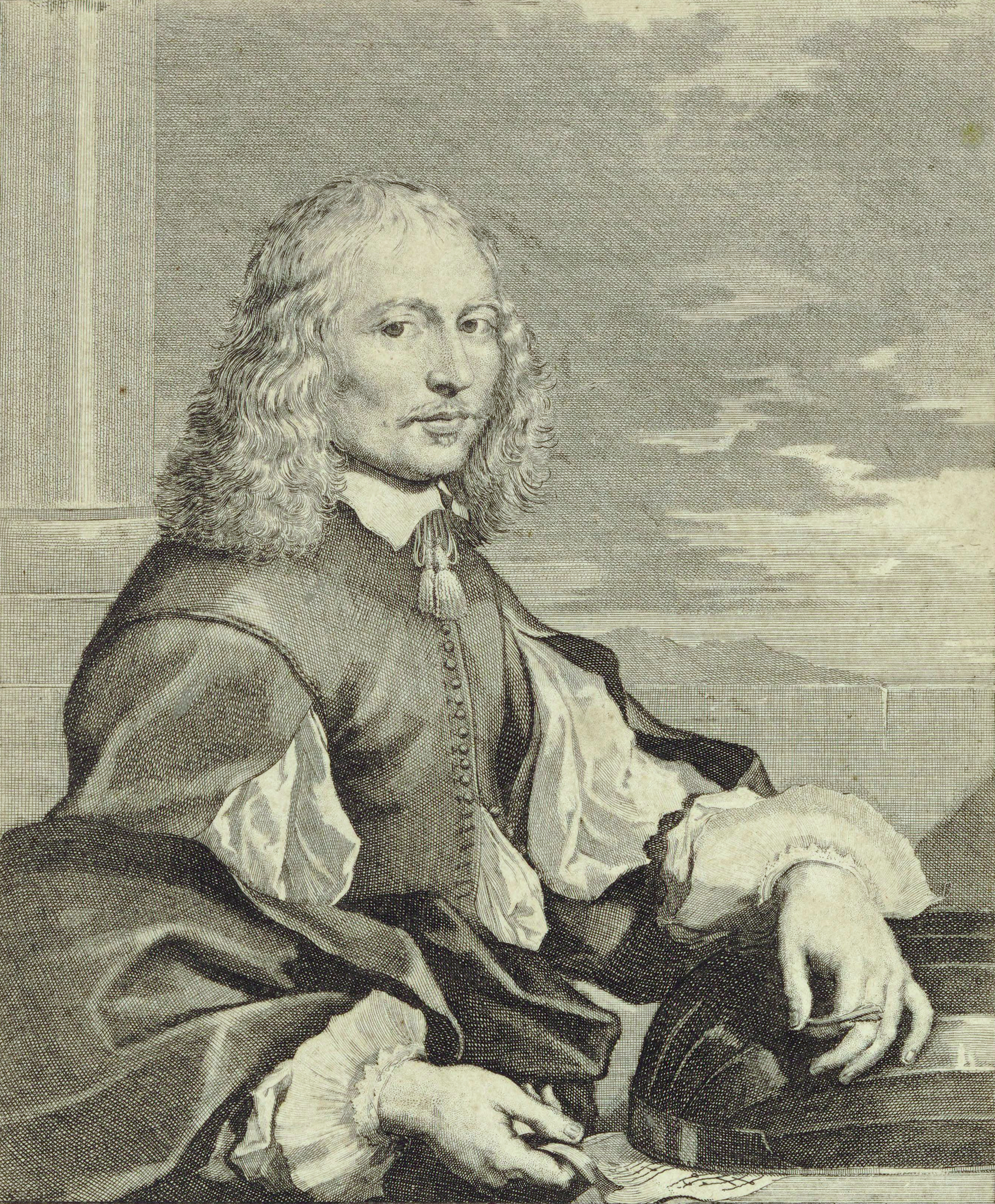
Nicolas Hotmann, 1650

Nicolas Hotman (also Autheman, Haultemant, Hautman, Otteman; ca. 1610–1663) was a Baroque composer, who spent most of his career in France. He is believed to have been from Germany, but was probably born in Brussels. He came with his family to Paris around 1626, where he died in April of the year 1663.

He was known to be an expert player of the lute, theorbo, and the viola da gamba, as well as the composer of a few surviving musical compositions. Hotman is sometimes referred to as the teacher of violist Monsieur de Sainte-Colombe.

== Works ==
- Suite de Monsieur Otteman
- Airs à boire à 3 parties (Paris, 1664)
