= Marin Marais =

French composer and viol player (1656–1728)

- Portrait by André Bouys, 1704
- Born: 31 May 1656; Paris, Kingdom of France
- Died: 15 August 1728 (aged 72); Paris
- Occupations: Composer; violist
- Spouse: Catherine d'Amicourt (1676-1728)
- Children: 19, incl. Roland Marais (son)

Marin Marais (French: [maʁɛ̃ maʁɛ]; 31 May 1656, Paris – 15 August 1728, Paris) was a French composer and viol player of the middle Baroque era. He studied composition with Jean-Baptiste Lully, often conducting his operas, and with the master of the bass viol Monsieur de Sainte-Colombe for six months. In 1676 he was hired as a musician to the royal court of Versailles and was successful there, being appointed in 1679 as ordinaire de la chambre du roy pour la viole, a title he kept until 1725.

He was the father of the composer Roland Marais (c. 1685 – c. 1750).

== Career ==
Marin Marais was a master of the viol, and the leading French composer of music for the instrument. He wrote five books of Pièces de viole (1686–1725) for the instrument, generally suites with basso continuo. These were quite popular in the court, and for these he was remembered in later years as he who "founded and firmly established the empire of the viol" (Hubert Le Blanc, 1740). His other works include a book of Pièces en trio (1692) and four operas (1693–1709), Alcyone (1706) being noted for its tempest scene.

Titon du Tillet included Marais in Le Parnasse françois, making the following comments on two of his pieces, Le Labyrinthe, perhaps inspired by the labyrinth of Versailles, and La Gamme:

A piece from his fourth book entitled The Labyrinth, which passes through various keys, strikes various dissonances and notes the uncertainty of a man caught in a labyrinth through serious and then quick passages; he comes out of it happily and finishes with a gracious and natural chaconne. But he surprised musical connoisseurs even more successfully with his pieces called La Gamme [The Scale], which is a piece de symphonie that imperceptibly ascends the steps of the octave; one then descends, thereby going through harmonious songs and melodious tones, the various sounds of music.

As with Sainte-Colombe, little of Marin Marais's personal life is known after he reached adulthood. Marin Marais married a Parisian, Catherine d'Amicourt, on 21 September 1676. They had nineteen children together.

Facsimiles of all five books of Marais's Pièces de viole are published by Éditions J. M. Fuzeau. A complete critical edition of his instrumental works in seven volumes, edited by John Hsu, is published by Broude Brothers.

Marais is credited with being one of the earliest composers of program music. His work The Bladder-Stone Operation, for viola da gamba and harpsichord, includes composer's annotations such as "The patient is bound with silken cords" and "He screameth." The title has often been interpreted as "The Gall-Bladder Operation," but that surgery was not performed until the late 19th century. Urinary bladder surgery to remove stones was already a medical specialty in Paris in the 17th century.

Marin Marais (1656–1728) – Pièces a Une Viole du Premier Livre (1686) – Prelude – Fantaisie – Allemande – Double – Courante – Double – Sarabande – Gigue – Double
Performed by New Comma Baroque

Marin Marais (1656–1728) – Chaconne, No. 82 from Premier livre de pièces à une et à deux violes (1689)
Performed by New Comma Baroque

Marin Marais (1656–1728) – Tombeau de Mr. Meliton, No. 83 from Premier livre de pièces à une et à deux violes (1689)
Performed by the Viols of Fort Wayne

Marin Marais (1656–1728) – Excerpts from Suite No.3 from Pieces en trio pour les flutes, violon, et dessus de viole (1692)
Performed by New Comma Baroque

Sonnerie de Sainte-Geneviève du Mont de Paris "The Bells of St. Genevieve" from La Gamme et Autres Morceaux de Symphonie (1723)
Performed by New Comma Baroque

Sonnerie de Sainte-Geneviève du Mont de Paris "The Bells of St. Genevieve" from La Gamme et Autres Morceaux de Symphonie (1723)
Performed by the Advent Chamber Orchestra with Stephen Balderston (cello)

== Works ==
=== Instrumental music ===
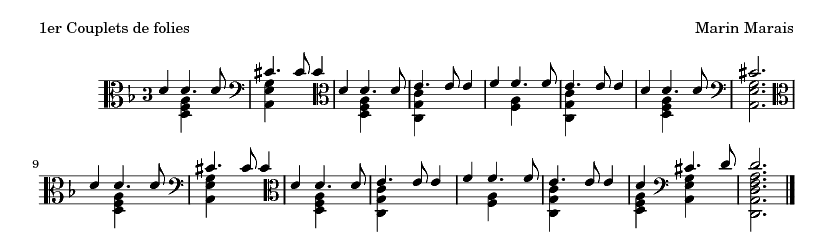
Viol part of Premiers couplets (sic) des Folies d'Espagne from Marin Marais's deuxième livre de pièces de viole for viola da gamba and figured bass

- Pieces for 1 and 2 viols, Book I (20 August 1686, only solo viols, 1 March 1689 first published with associated basso continuo)
- Pieces en trio pour les flutes, violon, et dessus de viole (published on 20 December 1692, dedicated to Marie-Anne Roland)
- Pieces for 1 and 2 viols, Book II (1701), including 32 couplets on "Les folies d'Espagne"
- Pièces de violes, Book III (1711)
- Pieces for 1 and 3 viols, Book IV (1717; includes the famous Suitte d'un Goût Étranger.)
- La gamme et autres morceaux de symphonie (1723, includes La Gamme en forme d'un petit Opéra, Sonate à la Maresienne, Sonnerie de Ste-Geneviève du Mont-de-Paris)
- Pièces de violes, Book V (1725)
- 145 Pieces for viol (ca. 1680), about 100 pieces were published in Books I–III

=== Operas ===
- Idylle dramatique of 1686 (music lost)
- Alcide (1693, in collaboration with Louis Lully)
- Ariane et Bacchus (1696)
- Alcyone (premiered on 18 February 1706)
- Sémélé (1709)
- Pantomime des pages (with Louis Lully, music lost)

=== Sacred works ===
- Te Deum (1701) for the recovery of the Dauphin (lost)
- Motet Domine salvum fac regem (1701) for the recovery of the Dauphin (lost)

== Discography ==
- Sonnerie de Ste-Genevieve du Mont, Suite en Do majeur (C major), Suite en Re majeur (D major); performers: Nikolaus Harnoncourt, A. Harnoncourt, L. Stastny, H. Tachezi; recording label: Harmonia Mundi, France, no. HMC 90414; 1973, 1987.
- Les Folies d'Espagne, La rêveuse, L'arabesque, Le badinage, Sonnerie de Ste-Genevieve du Mont; performers: Jordi Savall (Bass viola da gamba), Pierre Hantaï (Harpsichord), Rolf Lislevand (Theorbo); recording label: Alia Vox, 9821; 2002.
- Pièces de viole du Second Livre (1701) (Le Parnasse de la Viole, vol. II) – Jordi Savall et al. – Alia Vox AV 9828
- Suite d'un Goût Étranger, Pièces de viole du Quatrième Livre (1717), (Le Parnasse de la Viole, vol. III) – Jordi Savall et al. – Alia Vox AVSA 9851
- Pièces de viole du Cinquième Livre ~ J. Savall, C. Coin, T. Koopman, H. Smith, A. Gallet ~ Alia Vox AVSA 9872
- Alcione, Tragédie lyrique, Jennifer Smith, Gilles Ragon, Philippe Huttenlocher, Vincent Le Texier, Véronique Gens, Les Musiciens du Louvre, conducted by Marc Minkowski, 3 CD Erato 1990
- Alcione, Suites des Airs à joüer (1706), Le Concert des Nations, conducted by Jordi Savall, CD Astrée-Auvidis 1994
- Sémélé, Tragédie lyrique, Shannon Mercer, Bénédicte Tauran, Jaël Azzaretti, Marc Labonnette, Le Concert Spirituel conducted by Hervé Niquet, 2 CD Glossa 2007. Le Diamant magazine Opéra, 10 de Classica, Diapason découverte.
- Ariane et Bacchus (1696), Suite d'orchestre, The Versailles Revolution, Indiana Baroque Orchestra, conducted by Barthold Kuijken, CD Naxos 2018
- Sémélé, Ouvertures et danses, Montréal Baroque, conducted by Wieland Kuijken, SACD Atma baroque 2006
- Premier Livre de pièces de viole, complete (1686), L'Achéron, François Joubert-Caillet, viole de gambe. 4 CD Ricercar 2016–2017. Diapason d'or.
- Deuxième Livre de pièces de viole, complete (1701), L'Achéron, François Joubert-Caillet, viole de gambe. 5 CD Ricercar 2019. Diapason d'or.
- Troisième Livre de Pièces de Viole, complete (1711), L'Achéron, François Joubert-Caillet, viole de gambe. 4 CD Ricercar 2021.
- Quatrième Livre de Pièces de Viole , complete (1717), L’Achéon, François Joubert-Caillet, viole de gambe. 4 CD Ricercar 2021.
- Cinquième Livre de pièces de Viole, complete (1725), L’Achéron, François Joubert-Caillet, viole de Gambe. 3 CD Ricercar 2021 (parution 11/2023).
- Alcione, Tragédie lyrique, Lisandro Abadie, Marc Mauillon, Cyril Auvity, Le Concert des Nation, conducted by Jordi Savall, 3 SACD Alia Vox 2020
- Ariane et Bacchus (1696), Tragédie lyrique, Judith Van Wanroij (Ariane), Mathias Vidal (Bacchus), Véronique Gens (La Nymphe de la Seine, Juno), Marie Perbost (La Gloire, Corcine), David Witczak (Adraste), Les Chantres du Centre de Musique baroque de Versailles, Le Concert Spirituel, conducted by Hervé Niquet. 2 CD Alpha 2023. Diapason d'or

== References in film ==
- Marais and his music were featured in the film Tous les matins du monde (1991), an atmospheric, meticulously imagined life of Monsieur de Sainte-Colombe. Marais's music figured prominently in that film, including his longer work Sonnerie de Ste-Geneviève du Mont-de-Paris (1723). The role of Marin Marais is played by Gérard Depardieu as an old man and by Guillaume Depardieu as a young man. The soundtrack was done by the violist Jordi Savall.
- A recording of the Sonnerie performed on a Fairlight synthesizer was used in the cult classic film Liquid Sky.
- "Le badinage" features in No Other Choice (2025) by Park Chan-wook.
