= Monsieur de Sainte-Colombe =

French composer and violist (c.1640–1700)

Jean (?) de Sainte-Colombe (c. 1640 – c. 1700) was a French composer and violist. He was a celebrated master of the viola da gamba and was credited (by Jean Rousseau in his Traité de la viole (1687)) with adding the seventh string, tuned to the note AA (A_{1} in scientific pitch notation), on the bass viol.

== Life and works ==
Few details of his life are known; for example, neither the names of his parents, nor the precise dates of his birth and death. Research has revealed that his first name was Jean (other sources mention the name of Augustine of Autrecourt, Sieur de Sainte-Colombe) and also that he had as teacher the theorbo and viola player, Nicolas Hotman.

Sainte-Colombe performed publicly in the Parisian Salons, as did most of his colleagues and music masters such as Le Sieur Dubuisson. According to Titon du Tillet, he often performed in consort with his two daughters and with his own students, as attested by the copyist who wrote out his pieces for two viols as well as the solo-viol Tournus Manuscript. Sainte-Colombe's most notable student was Marin Marais, who wrote Tombeau pour Monsieur de Sainte-Colombe, in 1701, as a memorial to his instructor. Sainte-Colombe's students also included the Sieur de Danoville, Jean Desfontaines, Pierre Méliton, Jean Rousseau and two women known only as Mlle Rougevillle and Mlle Vignon.

Amongst the extant works of Sainte-Colombe are sixty-seven Concerts à deux violes esgales, and over 170 pieces for solo seven-string viol, making him perhaps the most prolific French viol composer before Marin Marais.

== Family history ==
It is speculated by various scholars that Monsieur de Sainte-Colombe was of Lyonnais or Burgundian petty nobility; and also the selfsame 'Jean de Sainte-Colombe' noted as the father of 'Monsieur de Sainte-Colombe le fils.' This assumption was erroneous, according to subsequent research in Paris by American bass viol player and musicologist Jonathan Dunford. Dunford suggests he was probably from the Pau area in southernmost France and a Protestant, that his first name was "Jean" and that he had two daughters named Brigide and Françoise.

== Contemporary references ==
In 1991, Pascal Quignard published a novel giving a conjectural picture of the relationship between M. de Sainte-Colombe and Marin Marais, entitled Tous les matins du monde (All the Mornings of the World). Alain Corneau directed a film based on it, with Jean-Pierre Marielle as Sainte-Colombe, Guillaume Depardieu as the young and Gérard Depardieu as the aged Marin Marais. The soundtrack of the film was realized by Jordi Savall.

A quotation from a composition of Monsieur de Sainte-Colombe is used in Carlo Forlivesi's Requiem (1999).
