= William Drew (composer) =

English composer

William Drew (died August 1637) was an English composer. Few of his compositions are known, all for viola da gamba solo, in lyra-viol style, or for a consort of viols. One of the many lyra-viol tunings takes its name from him. This suggests that he was a lyra-violist.

== Biography ==
Drew was one of the musicians of the Queen Henrietta Maria of France, wife of Charles I of England, from Michaelmas 1627 until his death in August 1637. Then, he was replaced by the French musician William le Grand. As most people in Henrietta Maria's entourage, he was presumably Catholic. He was married to Susan, who survived him.

== Works ==
- His works for lyra-viol (Prelude, Almans, Corants, Sarabands etc.) are known from three manuscripts:

GB-Cu ms. Hen.Dep. 77/1 (14 pieces); GB-Ob ms.mus.sch. F.575 (6 pieces); D-Kl 4° Ms. Mus. 108, vol.7, ff. 6 and 10 (3 pieces) (violadagambanetwork).

- The remaining compositions are trios for treble, tenor and bass viols (Almans, Coranto, Sarabands) from:

GB-Och Mus. 379-381, items 41-51 (11 pieces), where they are collected together with compositions by John Jenkins (composer), Charles Coleman, Simon Ives, John Cobbs and others (Christ Church Library).
