= Chest of viols =

Consort of viols, or cabinet

Chest of viols is a term which was used primarily in the 16th and 17th centuries in England for either a consort of viols, or the specialized cabinet made to contain a small consort of viols, usually containing six: two treble, two tenor, and two bass viols, or alternately two treble, three tenor, and one bass viol. According to Thomas Mace, "a good chest of viols" contained "six in number, 2 Basses, 2 Tenors, 2 Trebles, all truly proportionally suited."

When the term refers to instruments, they are generally similar in make, tone, power, relative size (proportional), wood type, and color. In terms of size, the bass viol's string length should be exactly twice that of the treble viol's. The similarity required of the viols in a chest of viols usually meant that they were made by the same maker, and sometimes were ordered in sets. Similar viols were desirable because they would blend better, and also stay in tune with each other better than more disparate instruments.

One enclosure is described by Thomas Tudway in Hawkins's General History as "a large hutch, with several apartments and partitions in it; each partition was lined with green bays, to keep the instruments from being injured by the weather." These cases were sometimes expanded to house an expanding collection of instruments. As mentioned in the above quote, the purpose of the chest was not only to house the instruments, but also to protect them from changes in temperature and humidity, which can damage instruments.

Many wealthy English families owned a chest of viols, which speaks to the popularity of consort music for viol in home music-making, as a private entertainment. In 1617 Richard Boyle, 1st Earl of Cork bought a chest of viols for £8 sterling. £8 sterling in 1600 would be worth about US$1550 in 2010. A similar grouping can be found in chests of lutes.

== See also ==
- Viol
