= Ganassi =

Ganassi may refer to:

== People ==
- Silvestro Ganassi dal Fontego (1492–1565), Italian musician
  - Ganassi recorder, constructed according to Silvestro's fingering charts
- Chip Ganassi (b. 1958), American businessman and former auto racing driver
  - Chip Ganassi Racing, an automotive racing organization founded and owned by Chip Ganassi
- Sonia Ganassi (b. 1966), Italian mezzo-soprano

== Other ==
- Ganassi, Lanao del Sur, a municipality in the Philippines
