= Schola Cantorum Basiliensis =

Music academy in Basel, Switzerland

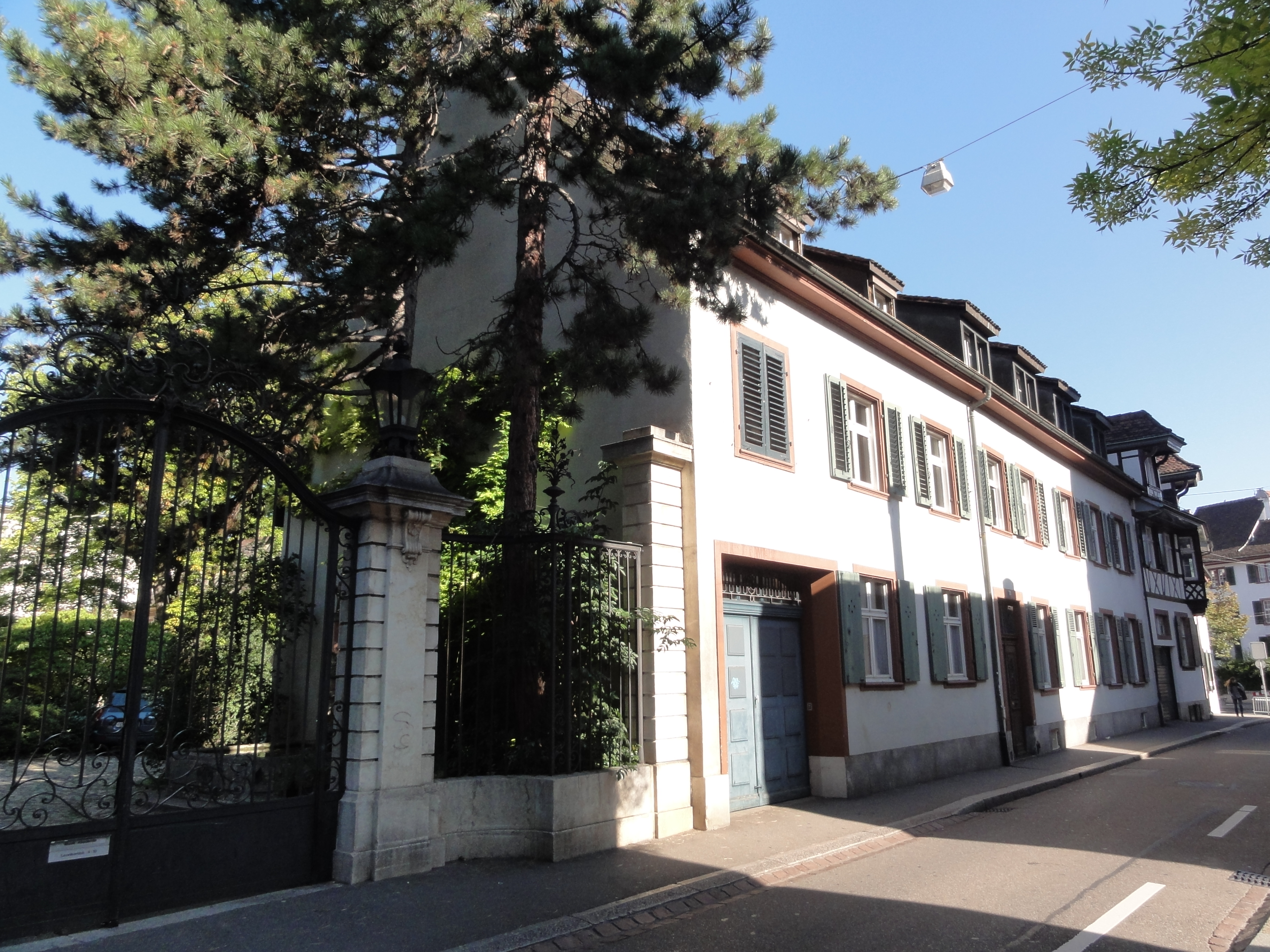
Schola Cantorum Basiliensis in 2012

The Schola Cantorum Basiliensis (SCB) is a music academy and research institution located in Basel, Switzerland, that focuses on early music and historically informed performance. Faculty at the school have organized performing ensembles that have made notable recordings of early music. One of the more popular of these is the 1994 album Chill to the Chant.

== History ==
Paul Sacher founded the school in 1933. Influential faculty included August Wenzinger (cello and viola da gamba), Ina Lohr (violin), and Max Meili (vocal music). In 1954 the Schola merged with two other Basel music schools to form the City of Basel Music Academy.

== Faculty ==
Among the school's other notable faculty members, past and present, are musicians from many countries. By nationality, they include:

- Australia: keyboardist and conductor Geoffrey Lancaster
- Belgium: countertenor and conductor René Jacobs
- England: lutenist and ensemble leader Anthony Rooley; soprano Evelyn Tubb; viola da gambist Alison Crum
- France: cellist and conductor Christophe Coin; flautist Marc Hantaï; conductor Dominique Vellard; fiddler Baptiste Romain
- Germany: flautist/recorder player and conductor Hans-Martin Linde; countertenor Andreas Scholl; tenor Gerd Türk; viola da gambist Veronica Hampe; lutenist Marc Lewon
- Italy: organist Lorenzo Ghielmi, organist, harpsichordist and conductor Andrea Marcon; harpsichordist Francesco Corti; viola da gambist Paolo Pandolfo
- Netherlands: cantor and conductor Jan Boeke; harpsichordist, organist and conductor Gustav Leonhardt; violinist Jaap Schröder; sackbuttist Charles Toet; cantor and gambist Henk Waardenburg; flautist, gambist and music therapist Wil Waardenburg.
- Portugal: lutenist and conductor Manuel Morais
- Spain: viola da gambist and conductor Jordi Savall
- Switzerland: violinist and conductor Chiara Banchini; violist da gambist and cellist Hannelore Mueller; baritone Kurt Widmer
- United States of America: bassoonist Donna Agrell, lutenists Hopkinson Smith and Crawford Young; cornettist Bruce Dickey; fiddler Randall Cook; and trumpeter Edward H. Tarr.

== Alumni ==
Notable alumni have included such musicians such as Gustav Leonhardt, Jordi Savall, Barbara Thornton, Christina Pluhar, Elam Rotem, Jorge Guerrero Dantur, Benjamin Bagby and Miriam Andersén.

=== Lutenists ===
Lutenists who have studied at the Schola include:

- Robert Barto (b. USA; studied with Eugen Müller-Dombois)
- Luciano Contini (b. Italy; studied with Eugen Müller-Dombois and Hopkinson Smith)
- Eduardo Egüez (b. Argentina; studied with Hopkinson Smith)
- Paul O'Dette (b. USA; studied with Eugen Müller-Dombois and Thomas Binkley)
- Anthony Bailes (b. Great Britain; studied with Eugen Müller-Dombois)
- Toyohiko Satoh (b. Japan; studied with Eugen Müller-Dombois)
- Manuel Morais (b. Portugal; studied with Eugen Müller-Dombois)
- Edin Karamazov (b. Bosnia-Herzegovina; studied with Hopkinson Smith)
- Marc Lewon (b. Germany, studied with Crawford Young)
- Rolf Lislevand (b. Norway; studied with Eugen Müller-Dombois and Hopkinson Smith)
- Evangelina Mascardi (b. Argentina; studied with Hopkinson Smith)
- Rafael Benatar (b. Venezuela; studied with Eugen Müller-Dombois and Hopkinson Smith)
