= Rose Consort of Viols =

The Rose Consort of Viols
- Genres: Renaissance consort music on viol
- Years active: 1990–present
- Labels: Naxos, Deux Elles
- Members: Alison Crum, John Bryan, Roy Marks, Peter Wendland, Ibrahim Aziz, Andrew Kerr, Susanna Pell
- Website: roseconsort.co.uk

The Rose Consort of Viols is an English ensemble of viol players, formed in 1990. They perform mainly early consort music, including works by Orlando Gibbons, John Dowland, and Henry Purcell.

They have performed around the world at many events, have appeared a number of times for the BBC, and have made a number of recordings, several of which have been made in collaboration with Red Byrd, a vocal group from Hyperion Records.

The name was taken from a famous family of viol makers.

== Discography ==
- Elizabethan Christmas Anthems (with Red Byrd) (Saydisc, 1990)
- Born is the Babe: Renaissance Music for Christmas (Woodmansterne, 1990)
- Dowland: Lachrimae (Saydisc, 1992)
- Ah, Dear Heart (Woodmansterne, 1993)
- Jenkins: All in a Garden Green (Naxos, 1993)
- William Byrd: Consort and Keyboard Music, Songs and Anthems (with Red Byrd) (Naxos, 1994)
- Thomas Tomkins: Consort Music for Viol and Voices; Keyboard Music (Naxos, 1995)
- William Lawes: Consort Music for Viols, Lutes and Theorboes (Naxos, 1996)
- Orlando Gibbons: Consort and Keyboard Music, Songs and Anthems (with Red Byrd) (Naxos, 1997)
- John Dowland: Consort Music and Songs (Naxos, 1997)
- Henry Purcell: Complete Fantazias and In Nomines (Naxos, 1997)
- Alfonso Ferrabosco: Consort Music (CPO, 1997)
- John Ward: Upon a Bank of Roses, Consort Music (CPO, 1998)
- Elizabethan Consort Music and Dramatic Songs (Naxos, 1999)
- Four Gentlemen of the Chapel Royal (Deux-Elles, 2008)
- Loquebantur: Music from the Baldwin Partbooks with the Marian Consort (Delphian, 2010)
- An Emerald in a Work of Gold: Music from the Dow Partbooks with the Marian Consort (Delphian, 2012)
- Serenissima: Music from Renaissance Europe on Venetian Viols (Delphian, 2014)
- Mynstrelles with Straunge Sounds: the earliest consort music for viols (Delphian, 2015)
