= Ina Lohr =

Dutch musicologist (1903–1983)

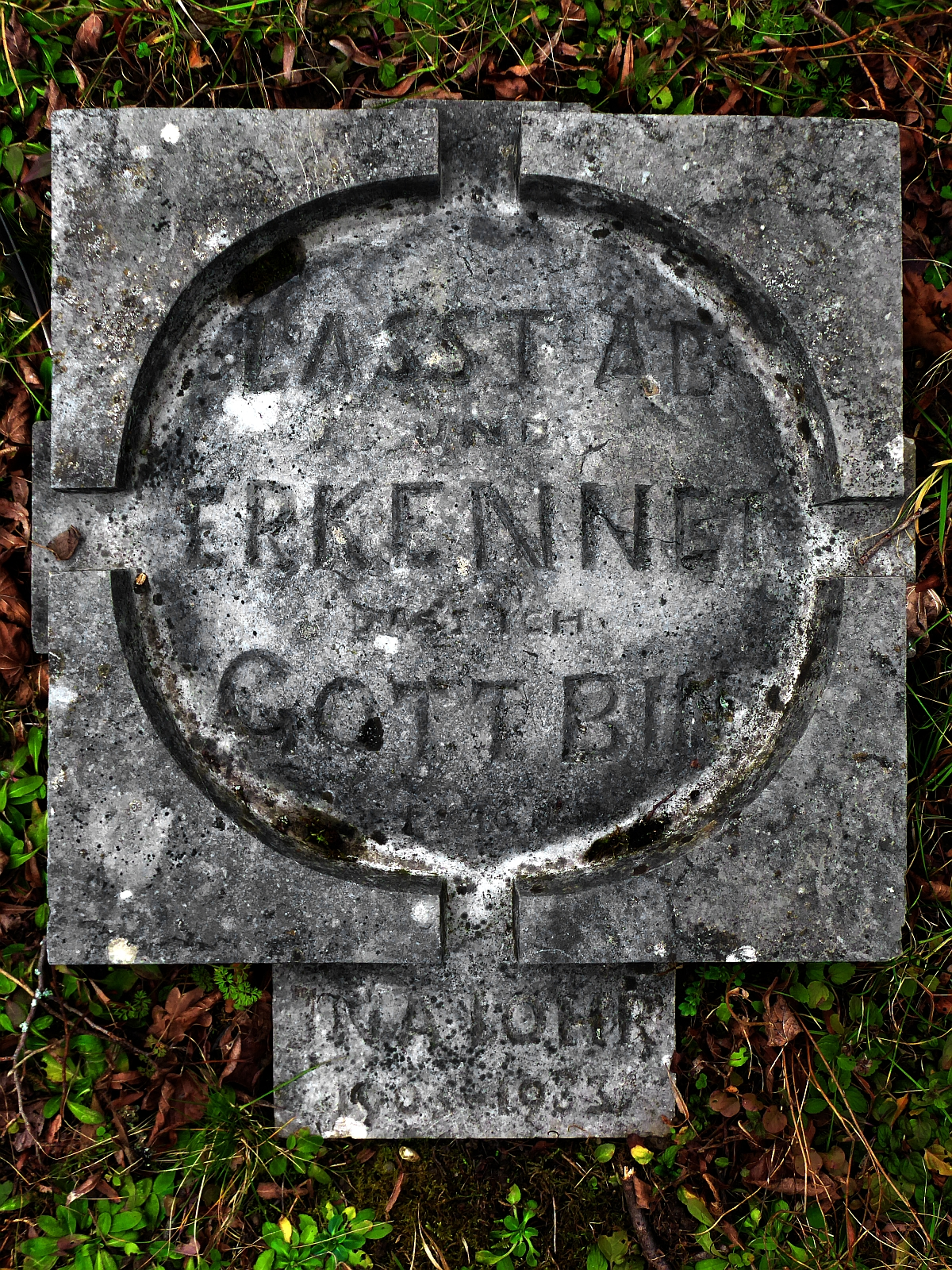
Ina Lohr (1.8.1903–8.10.1983) Music educator, teacher, author, Dr. H.C. Theol. The University of Basel. Grave at the cemetery Hoernli, Riehen, Basel, Switzerland. Wikipedia Photo by Memorywall

Ina Lohr (also Marina Lohr; 1 August 1903 – 1983) was a Swiss composer, music teacher, conductor and a founding member of Schola Cantorum Basiliensis. She was a pioneer in early music, and received an honorary doctorate in theology from the University of Basel.

== Personal life and career ==
Lohr was born in Amsterdam on 1 August 1903 as Marina Lohr. She grew up in a musical family, and studied the violin at the Muziek-Lyceum Amsterdam under Ferdinand Helman and graduated from there in 1929 with a violin pedagogy degree. As a student she learned Gregorian chant from Hubert Cuypers and was an assistant for the boys’ choir at the Mozes en Aäronkerk in Amsterdam. She also knew Belgian musicologist Charles van den Borren and Safford Cape, who was a pioneer of early music.

After her studies, Lohr took a trip to Davos, Switzerland by train for a vacation with her sister, who was recuperating from tuberculosis there. During the journey she felt weak and got off in Basel to stay with friends. The stop of a few days became permanent, and she decided to live there in 1942. She studied with H. Rutters, Professor Karl Nef and G. Gueldenstein.

In 1930, Lohr became an assistant of Paul Sacher which heavily impacted her music career. Lohr later became a founding member and instructor of Schola Cantorum Basiliensis, where she taught Protestant church music and liturgy, basso continuo, Gregorian chant, and hymnology. Due to her health, she gave up performing around 1940 to concentrate on teaching. In 1958, the University of Basel gave her an honorary doctorate in theology.

A biography of Ina Lohr by Anne Smith called Ina Lohr (1903-1983). Transcending the Boundaries of Early Music was published by Schola Cantorum Basiliensis Scripta in 2020.
