= Paolo Pandolfo =

Italian musician

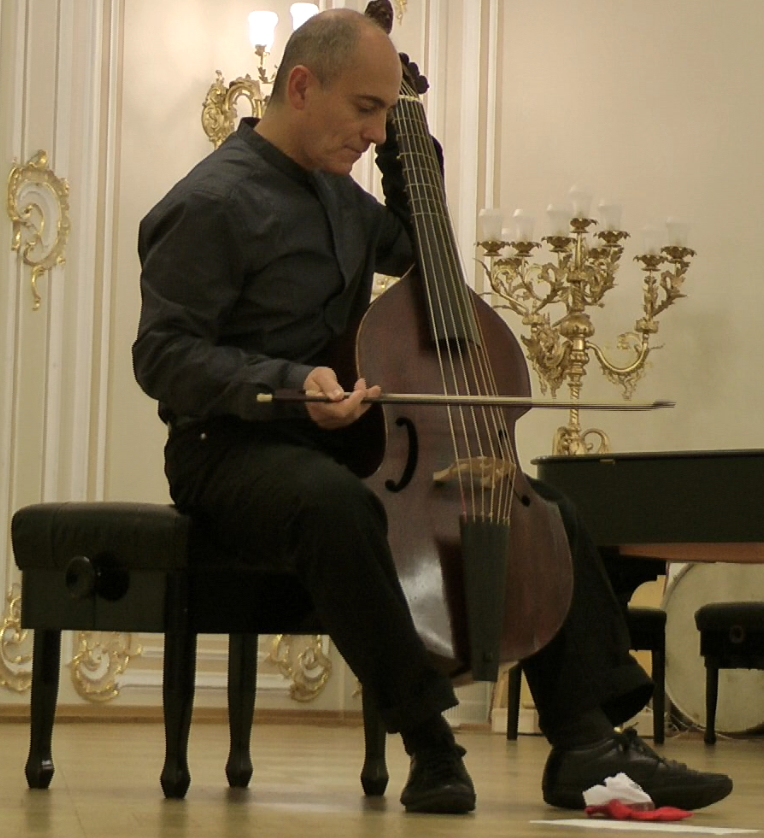

Paolo Pandolfo is an Italian virtuoso player, composer, and teacher of music for the viola da gamba, born on September 2, 1959.

He began his studies as a double bass and guitar player, becoming a skilled performer of jazz and popular music. In the mid-late 1970s he studied double bass at the Rome Conservatory with Maestro Lucio Buccarella. At the same time he played the viola da gamba as an autodidact with ensemble Musica Insieme Roma and Thatrum Instrumentorum Roma. In 1979 he co-founded the early music ensemble La Stravaganza with Enrico Gatti and Rinaldo Alessandrini, and then moved to Basel, Switzerland in 1981 where he studied with Jordi Savall at the Schola Cantorum Basiliensis. From 1982 to 1990 Pandolfo was a member of Jordi Savall's early music groups Hespèrion XX.

From 1990 Pandolfo to 2025 served as professor of viola da gamba at the Schola Cantorum Basiliensis — a position previously held by maestros August Wenzinger and Jordi Savall. He also directs, records, and performs regularly with his viola da gamba-oriented early music ensemble Labyrinto, which he co-founded in 1992.

Pandolfo has recorded numerous CDs. For most of the 1980s he recorded primarily with Jordi Savall and others. His first recording as a soloist was in 1990 with the release of his highly acclaimed CD C. P. E. Bach: Sonatas for Viola da Gamba (Tactus). He has also recorded a viola da gamba interpretation of the cello suites of J. S. Bach. Pandolfo explains that the suites, although written for the cello, were conceived in the polyphonic style of the viola da gamba; further, the dance suite was a common form for viola da gamba music, and playing the Bach suites on the gamba is thus a way to reclaim this tradition for the viola da gamba.

Pandolfo has said that the patrimony of ancient music can be a powerful inspiration for the future of the Western musical tradition. Building bridges between past and present is therefore an important part of his work.

== Discography ==
- 1990: C. P. E. Bach: Sonatas for Viola da Gamba (Tactus, reissued Brilliant Classics)
- 1995: J. S. Bach: Sonatas for Viola da Gamba and harpsichord (Harmonia Mundi)
- 1996: Forqueray: Pièces de viole avec la basse continuë (integrale, Glossa; 2 CDs)
- 1996: Tobias Hume: The Spirit of Gambo (Glossa; with Emma Kirkby and Labyrinto)
- 1997: Io Canterei d'Amor - O. diLasso, T. Crequillon, Arcadelt, D. Ortiz, R. Rogniono, A. Gabrieli (Labirinto V. Ruffo - Harmonia Mundi)
- 1998: A Solo - P. Pandolfo, T. Hume, Corkins, DeMachy, M. Marais, J. S. Bach, C. F. Abel (Glossa)
- 1999: Canzon del Principe (solos by Oratio Bassani played by P. Pandolfo) (Divox Antiqua)
- 1999: Corelli: Sonate per Viola da Gamba e basso continuo, Op. 5 (Symphonia)
- 2000: Marin Marais: Le Labyrinth et autres Histoires (Glossa)
- 2002: Marin Marais: Le Grand Ballet (Glossa)
- 2002: Heinrich Isaac: La Spagna - Includes D. Ortiz - Variations on La Spagna played by P. Pandolfo (Bongiovanni)
- 2004: Travel Notes: New Music for the Viola da Gamba composed by Paolo Pandolfo (Glossa)
- 2005: J. S. Bach: The Six Suites (Glossa)
- 2005: Mr. de Sainte-Colombe: Pièces de viole (Glossa)
- 2006: Improvisando (Glossa)
- 2009: Carl Friedrich Abel: The Drexel Manuscript (Glossa)
- 2010: J. S. Bach: Sonatas for Viola da Gamba & Harpsichord (Glossa)
- 2011: J. H. Schmelzer: Sonatas (Glossa; with Labyrinto and Ensemble Aurora)
- 2012: Mr. De Machy: Pièces de Violle (Glossa)
- 2013: François Couperin: Pièces de violes (Glossa)
- 2016: Marais 1689: Pièces à une et à deux violes et basse continue (Glossa)
- 2017: Kind of Satie (Glossa; with Andrea Pandolfo and Michelangelo Rinaldi)
- 2017: The Excellency of Hand: English Viola da Gamba Duos (Resonus; with Robert Smith)
- 2017: G. P. Telemann: Fantasias for Viola da Gamba (Glossa)
- 2018: Regina Bastarda (Glossa)
- 2020: Carl Friedrich Abel: A Sentimental Journey – Sonatas for Viola da Gamba and Bass (Glossa)
- 2024: Alfonso Ferrabosco the younger: To The World - The Lessons For Lyra Viol (1609)

Pandolfo is also a contributing performer on dozens of other recordings, collaborating with various well known artists, including:

- Jordi Savall: Hespèrion XX and Hespèrion XXI (numerous titles)
- 1985: Bach: Die Kunst der Fuge – Hespèrion XX / Jordi Savall
- 1990: Diego Ortiz: Recercadas del Trattado de Glosas, 1553 (Alia Vox) – with Savall, Ton Koopman, Andrew Lawrence-King, Rolf Lislevand
- 2021: Dieterich Buxtehude: Complete Chamber Music – Ton Koopman
