= Alison Crum =

- Born: 23 November 1949 (age 76); United Kingdom
- Genres: Classical
- Occupation: Gambist
- Instrument: Viola da Gamba,
- Website: Alisoncrum.co.uk

Alison Crum (born 23 November 1949, in the United Kingdom), is an English viol player.

== Biography ==
She got her first viol while studying music at Reading University, and went on to study at the Royal Conservatory of Brussels with Wieland Kuijken and, later, with Jordi Savall at the Schola Cantorum Basiliensis. She has made around ninety recordings - mostly with the Consort of Musicke, the Dowland Consort, Musica Antiqua of London, and the Rose Consort of Viols - but also featuring as a soloist on two discs of Marais, and more recently with Laurence Cummings, on a recording of the three Bach gamba sonatas, and playing Italian virtuoso divisions on renaissance viols with Musica Antiqua on their 'Word Play' CD.

She is President of the Viola da Gamba Society of Great Britain, and is Professor of Viola da gamba at Trinity College of Music in London. She directs many courses for viol players, including the International Viol Summer School, attracting players from all over the world, and has had published a series of graded music books centred on her highly acclaimed textbook 'Play the Viol' - now in its fifth reprint. Her second book, 'The Viol Rules' was published in November 2009.

== Discography ==
- Bach; Viola da gamba sonatas (Signum SIGCD 024)
- Marais; Greatest Masterworks (Naxos 8.550750 and 8.553081)
- Buxtehude; Jubilate Domino (Meridian CDE 84332)
- Elizabethon Christmas Anthems (Amon Ra CD-SAR-46)
- Lawes: Consort music for Viols, Lutes and Theorbos (Naxos 8.550601)
- Tomkins: Consort Music for Viols and Voices (Naxos 8.550602)
- Gibbons: Consort and Keyboard Music (Naxos 8.550603)
- Byrd: Consort and Keyboard Music (Naxos 8.550604)
- Jenkins: All in a Garden Green (Naxos 8.550687)
- Dowland: Consort Music and Songs (Naxos 8.553326)
- Purcell: Fantazias (Naxos 8.553957)
- Elizabethan Songs and Consort Music (Nazos 8.554284)
- Four Gentlemen of the Chapel Royal (DXL 1129)
- John Ward Consort Music: Upon a bank with roses (CPO 999 928)
- Alfonso Ferrabosco: Consort Music (CPO 999 859)
- Ah, Dear Heart (Woodmansterne 002–2)
- Lachrymae (Amon Ra CD-SAR-55)
- Born is the Babe (Woodmansterne 001–2)
