= Lyra viol =

Musical instrument

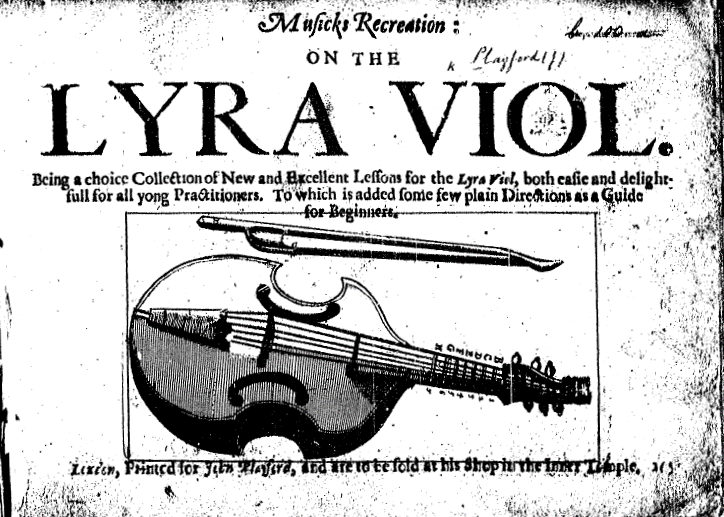
- Other names: Leero viol, Leerow viol, Liera viol, Lyro viol
- Classification: Bowed string instrument

Related instruments
- Viol

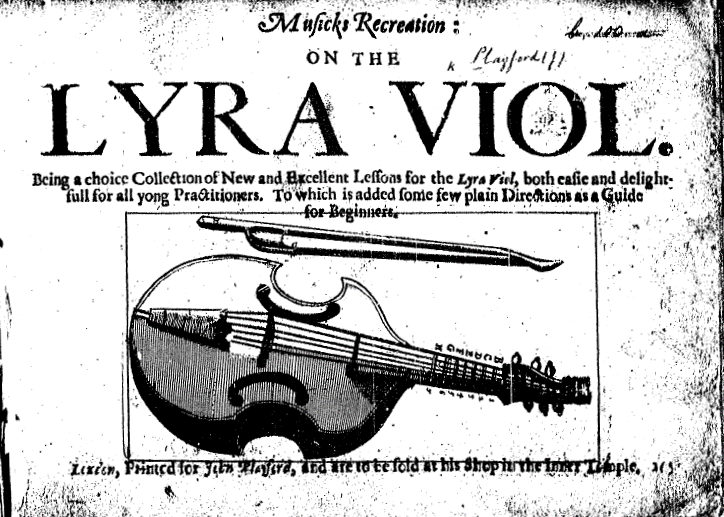
Frontispiece from John Playford's Musicks recreation on the lyra viol

The lyra viol is a small bass viol, used primarily in England in the seventeenth century.

Described as "the smallest of the bass viols", one should consider that the consort bass was much larger in 17th century England than most bass viols nowadays (hovering between 78 and 80 cm string length, while the division viol hovers around 76 cm (30 inches according to Christopher Simpson). The lyra viol therefore is the "smallest" and according to James Talbot (end of the 17th century) is therefore 72 cm string length. John Talbot's 17th century measurements for viols, The Orthodox viol sizes There is a large and important repertoire which was developed specifically for the lyra viol. Due to the number of strings and their rather flat layout, the lyra viol can approximate polyphonic textures, and because of its small size and large range, it is more suited to intricate and quick melodic lines than the larger types of bass viol.

The lyra viol has been favorably compared to both the lute and the violin, by Tobias Hume and Roger North respectively. The name lyra viol came into use because the playing style of bowed chords is similar to that of the lirone.

== Structure ==
The structure of the lyra viol has been fluid throughout its history. In seventeenth century England sympathetic strings were added, which according to John Playford was credited to Mr. Farrant. This use of sympathetic may have led to the development of the baryton, but it was not a lasting development for the lyra viol. The most common lyra viols had six strings, but there were also viols with four, five or seven strings. John Playford describes the lyra viol as the smallest of three types of bass viol: the consort bass, division viol, and lyra viol. Christopher Simpson wrote that the strings on the lyra viol were lighter and the bridge flatter than those on the other bass viols. The strings were also closer to the fingerboard than they were on the consort bass. These modifications were probably in part to make playing chords easier. The first description of bowed polyphonic music for the viol is in a treatise by Johannes Tinctoris, and the first development of its repertoire can be traced back to Sylvestro di Ganassi dal Fontego in the mid-sixteenth century. This technique of chordal writing with heavy use of ornamentation became integral with the French viol composers.

Despite these differences in structure, the lyra viol is not significantly different from other bass viols, and lyra viol music can be played on any bass viol. Although as we have seen during the 17th century builders made instruments specifically for this repertoire.

== Repertoire ==
Captaine Tobias Hume (1569-1649) - Tobacco, No.3 from the First Part of Ayres or the Musicall Humours (1605)

Captaine Tobias Hume (1569-1649) - Captaine Humes Pavan, No.46 from the First Part of Ayres (1605)

Captaine Tobias Hume (1569-1649) - The Spirit of Gambo (The Lord Dewys Favoret) from Captaine Hume’s Poeticall Musicke (1607)

John Playford (1623-1686) - Gerards Mistresse, No. 55, Musicks Recreation on the Viol, Lyra-Way (1652)

John Playford (1623-1686) - Farewell Fair Armida, No. 94, Musicks Recreation on the Viol, Lyra-Way (1682)
Performed by Phillip W. Serna, Viols & Violone

Some of the most famous English composers of the seventeenth century wrote pieces for the lyra viol, or even entire anthologies. These composers include John Cooper, John Jenkins, Christopher Simpson, Charles Coleman, and William Lawes. The types of pieces written for the instrument range from single melodic lines, to lyra trios and duets, lyra with other instruments, and lyra as accompaniment for a song. Almost all music for the lyra viol is written in tablature, mainly French lute tablature, but also some Italian and a little bit of German lute tablature.

Polyphonic music is idiomatic for the lyra viol. It is most similar to lute music, as the number of voices can change within a piece, unlike harpsichord music where the number of voices tends to stay consistent. Since the lyra viol is bowed, all chords must be formed using adjacent strings. This leads to very close harmonic voice leading, which may also be the reason for the frequent unison double stops in lyra viol music, perhaps also intended to imitate the double course of strings on the lute. Since all the chords must be formed using adjacent strings, scordatura tunings are the rule rather than the exception. Almost 60 different tunings from the seventeenth century have been found. They tended to be formulated so as to put the most important notes on open strings, and were composed in sets of pieces, so that players would not have to retune too frequently.

Another technique for the lyra viol was the ornament or grace known as the "thump", where the player plucks the open strings with the fingers of the left hand. This may have been the forerunner of the technique of plucking the sympathetic strings on the baryton. The viol may also have sometimes been held in the lap and played lute-style. The first reference to this practice is in Tobias Hume's The First Part of Ayres (1605), which was written a number of years before Claudio Monteverdi's Combattimento di Tancredi e Clorinda (1624) which is frequently cited as the earliest source of pizzicato. Hume's work also discusses playing col legno on the lyra viol.

Many manuscripts of lyra viol music survive showing the level of interest this style enjoyed. The last published collection of music for solo lyra viol John Playford published in 1682. In all, Playford published 5 collections of solo lyra viol music forming the largest published collection (1651, 165[5], 1661, 1669, and 1682). Dating Playford's second collection is difficult given that the few surviving volumes lack the final number in the date. Some sources date this collection to 1652. More recent scholarship by Pullens suggests a date of 1655.

Collections exist from France, Germany, and Sweden. Works for multiple lyra viols also exist. This style influenced the works of France's bass viola da gamba virtuosos of the late Baroque period.

The solo lyra viol music during the 17th century was identified as lessons. Generally, these works are either dance music, patriotic music (mainly loyalists), purely instrumental (preludium and symphony), or vocal music of a secular nature, often being transcriptions of popular songs of the day. Musicians were free to improvise upon a piece, often using ornaments, divisions, polyphonic textures, or adding their own music.

Lyra viol music frequently contains ornaments. However, ornamental signs were not consistently used even within a single publication or manuscript. This problem was never fully settled during the 1600s and is still one of the more vexing issues for lyra viol players and editors.

Even into the 20th century, lyra viol music was often misidentified in library catalogs. Some catalogs still retain these misattributions. Differentiating between tab for lute and lyra viol music requires careful examination of the music by an expert. Broken chords, and strings marked below the tablature lines are clear indications the music is not suitable for the lyra viol. Additionally, some catalogs lump lyra viol music with division music. Though this is a minor point, lyra viol music is traditionally set in tablature. Division music is traditionally set in staff notation.

With the revival of lyra viol performing, some composers have written works using tablature. Among these composers are Martha Bishop, Carol Herman (student of Dr. Frank Traficante), and Peter H. Adams (student of Carol Herman). Both Martha Bishop and Carol Herman have authored publications to assist musicians to learn to play lyra viol music. Peter H. Adams is publishing new editions of historic collections and composed over 100 lessons for solo lyra viol.

Research is still underway to answer basic questions such as how many lyra viol lessons currently exist; how many compositions can be ascribed to any one composer; and can we identify the composer of anonymous lessons. To that end, Gordon Dodd published "The Thematic Index of Music for the Viola da Gamba." This online index is a massive database that can only be searched by visually examining this multi-authored index. The database is not limited to lyra viol lessons. The database encompasses all historic music for viola da gamba. The Index is hosted by the Viola da Gamba Society of Great Britain.

== Recordings ==
Pavan from the Manchester Lyra Viol Book on a lyra-viol according to John Talbot's measurements (late 17th century) by John Pringle, 2014 Listen to Pavan by Gervise Gerrarde
