= Anthony Bailes =

Anthony Bailes (born 18 June 1947) is a British lutenist.

Anthony Bailes initially played the classical guitar, and after meeting Diana Poulton began to study the lute with her. He was awarded a grant by the Arts Council of Great Britain in 1971, and subsequently studied with Eugen Müller-Dombois at the Schola Cantorum Basiliensis in Basel, Switzerland. He has performed widely as a soloist, made numerous recordings, and published articles about lute performance practice. He has worked with many prominent musicians, such as Jordi Savall, Nigel Rogers, Emma Kirkby, and James Bowman. For many years he taught lute at the Sweelinck Conservatory of Music in Amsterdam.

== Selected recordings ==
- Lute Music of The Netherlands (Carpe Diem)
- Apollon Orateur, music by Denis & Ennemond Gaultier (Ramée)
- Old Gautiers Nightinghall, French lute music from the 17th century (Ramée)
- Une Douceur Violente - Lute pieces by Jaques de Gallot & Charles Mouton (Ramée)
- Lauten Galanterie – music by Falkenhagen, Hagen, and Baron (EMI/Reflexe)
- Pieces de Luth - music by Mesengau, Gaultier, and Mouton (EMI/Reflexe)
