= Thomas Mace =

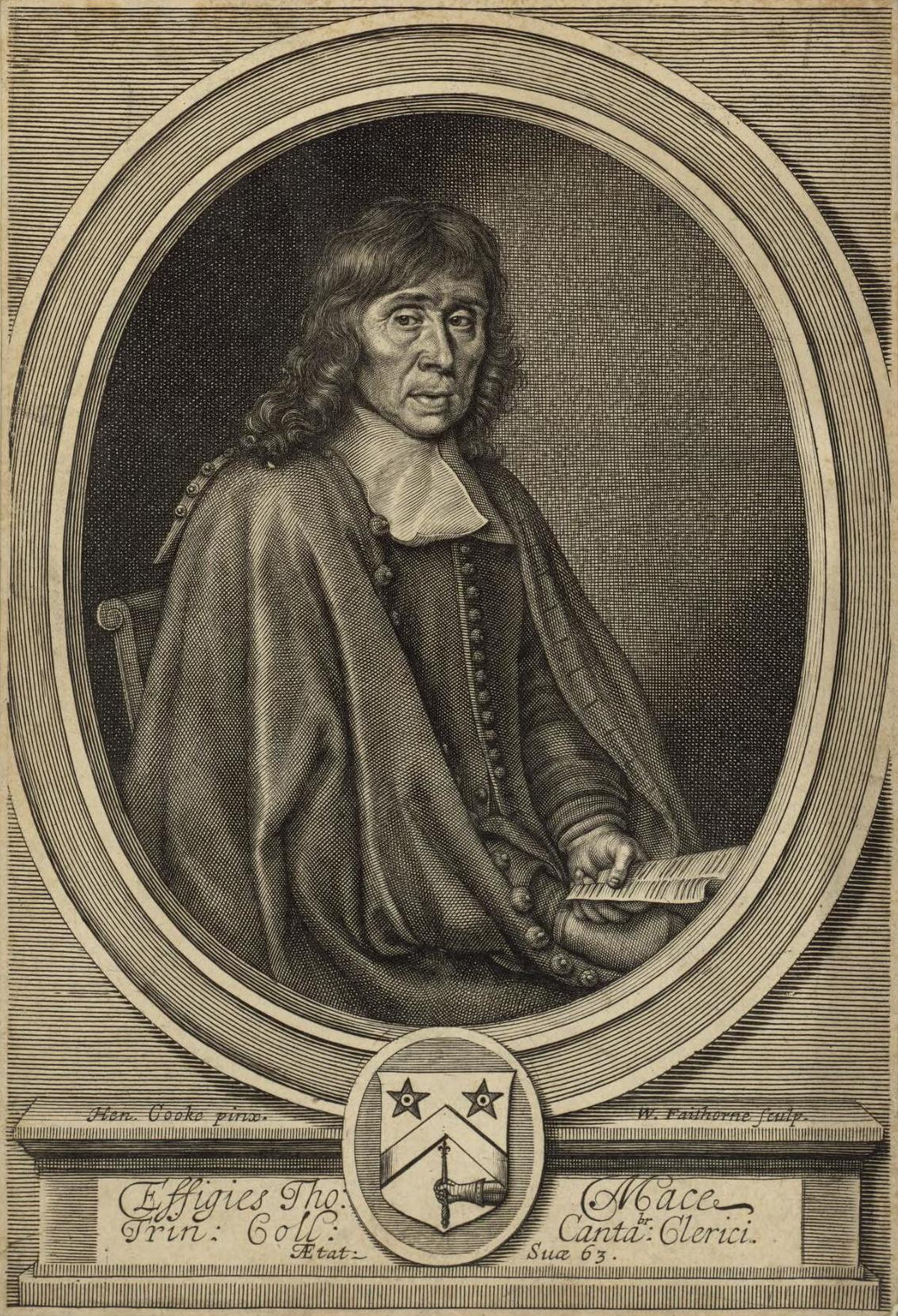
Portrait of Thomas Mace

Thomas Mace (1612 or 1613 – c. 1706) was an English lutenist, viol player, singer, composer and musical theorist of the Baroque era. His book Musick's Monument (1676) provides a valuable description of 17th century musical practice.

== Biography ==
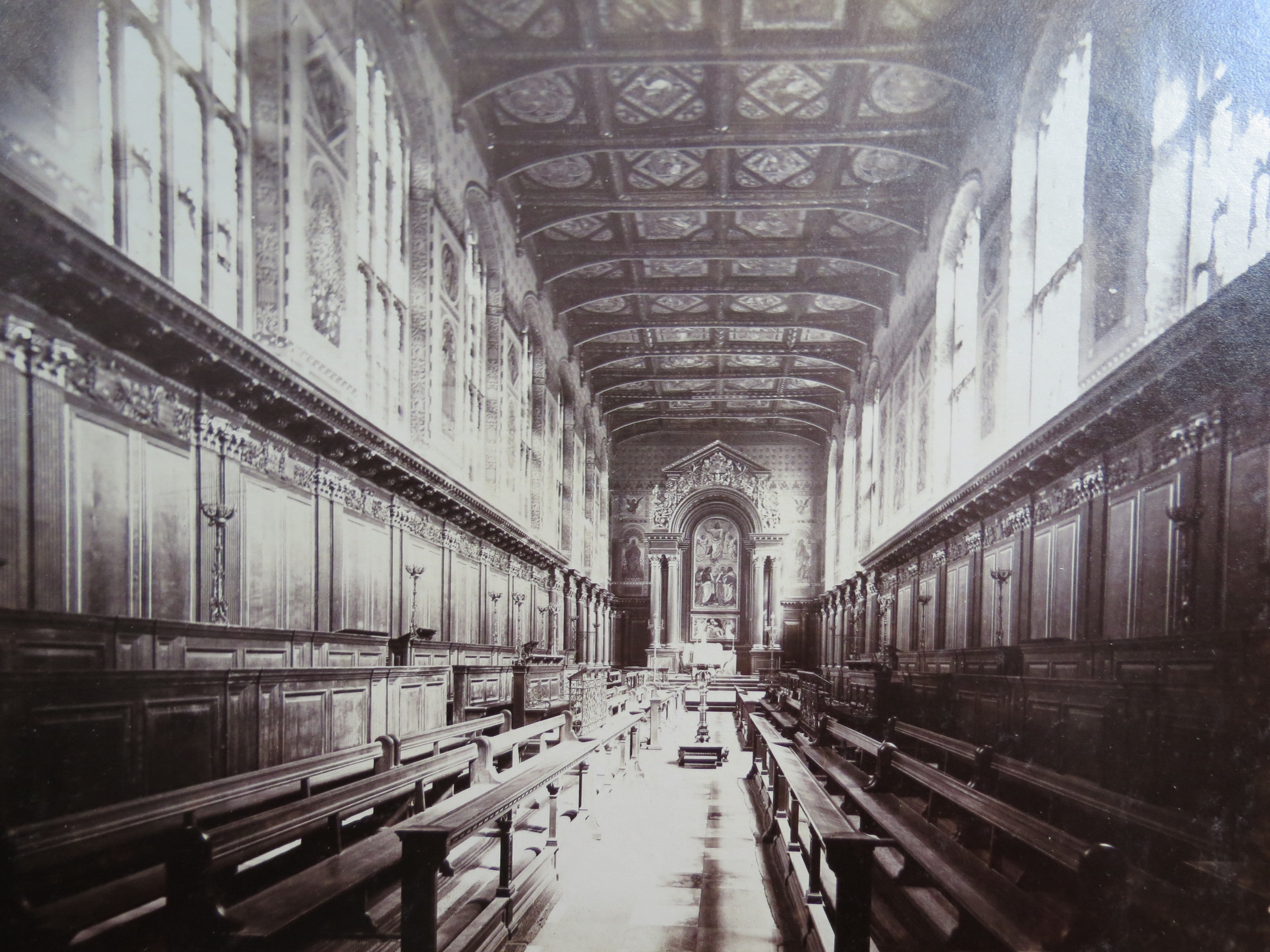
Chapel of Trinity College, Cambridge, interior

Born in 1612 or 1613, he played the lute from c. 1621, but his teacher if any is unknown. He also played the viol. He was a singer, termed a lay clerk, in the choir of Trinity College, Cambridge from 1635 until his death.

During the 1644 Siege of York, in the English Civil War, he was present in that city, where he had family.

He died c. 1706.

== Works ==
In 1676 he published Musick's Monument, for about 300 subscribers. The title page described it as:

Musick's Monument; OR, A REMEMBRANCER Of the Best Practical Musick, Both DIVINE, and CIVIL, that has ever been known, to have been in the World. Divided into Three Parts. The First PART, Shews a Necessity of Singing Psalms Well, in Parochial Churches, or not to Sing at all; ... The Second PART, Treats of the Noble Lute, (the Best of Instruments) now made Easie; ... In the Third PART, The Generous Viol, in Its Rightest Use, is Treated upon; with some Curious Observations, never before Handled, concerning It, and Musick in General.

Its large section on the lute contained a comprehensive lute tutorial and guide to the instrument, and there was a similar, smaller section on the viol. The book also contained some metaphysical speculation regarding the significance of musical ratios such as the octave.

John Hawkins in A General History Of The Science and Practice Of Music (1776) commented:

Under whom he was educated, or by what means he became possessed of so much skill in the science of music, as to be able to furnish out matter for a folio volume, he has no where informed us; nevertheless his book contains so many particulars respecting himself, and so many traits of an original and singular character, that a very good judgement may be formed both of his temper and ability. With regard to the first, he appears to have been an enthusiastic lover of his art; ... As to the latter, his knowledge of music seems to have been confined to the practice of his own instrument, and so much of the principles of the science, as enabled him to compose for it; but for his style in writing he certainly never had his fellow.
