= John Jenkins (composer) =

English composer

John Jenkins (c. 1592–c. 1678), was an English composer of the early Baroque period. He was born in Maidstone, Kent and died in Kimberley, Norfolk.

== Biography ==
Little is known of his early life. The son of Henry Jenkins, a carpenter who occasionally made musical instruments, he may have been the "Jack Jenkins" employed in the household of Anne Russell, Countess of Warwick in 1603. The first positive historical record of Jenkins is amongst the musicians who performed the masque The Triumph of Peace in 1634 at the court of King Charles I. Jenkins was considered a virtuoso on the lyra viol. Charles commented that Jenkins did "wonders on an inconsiderable instrument."

When the English Civil War broke out in 1642 it forced Jenkins, like many others, to migrate to the rural countryside. During the 1640s he was employed as music-master to two Royalist families, the Derham family at West Dereham and Hamon le Strange of Hunstanton. He was also a friend of the composer William Lawes (1602–1645), who was shot and died in battle at the siege of Chester.

Around 1640 Jenkins revived the In Nomine, an archaic form for a consort of viols, based upon a traditional plainsong theme. He wrote a notable piece of programme music consisting of a pavane and galliard depicting the clash of opposing sides, the mourning for the dead and the celebration of victory after the siege of Newark (1646).

In the 1650s Jenkins became resident music-master of Lord Dudley North in Cambridgeshire, whose son Roger wrote his biography. It was in these years, during the Commonwealth under Oliver Cromwell, in the absence of much competition or organised music-making, that Jenkins took the occasion to write more than 70 suites for amateur household players.

After the Restoration he obtained a place as a musician to the Royal Court. Although the viol consort was less fashionable in the court of king Charles II, Roger North wrote:

Tho' he for many years was incapable to attend, the Court musicians had so much value for him, that advantage was not taken, but he received his salary as they were paid.

Something of Jenkins's own temperament is indicated by his setting the religious poetry of George Herbert to music. Like Joseph Haydn, he was a pious, reticent, and private person. Workmanlike and industrious in composition, he wrote dances by the cart-load according to North, who also stated –

he was certainly a happy person,....of an easy temper, superior in his profession, well accepted by all, knew no want, saw himself outrun by the world, and having lived a good Christian, died in peace.

Jenkins is buried in the nave of St. Peter's Church, Kimberley, Norfolk, with this inscription:

Under this Stone Rare Jenkins lie
The Master of the Musick Art
Whom from the Earth the God on High
Called up to Him to bear his part.
Aged eighty six October twenty seven
In anno seventy eight he went to Heaven.

== Musical style ==
Pavan à6 in F, VdGS No.2, Oxford. Bodleian Library, Mus.Sch. c.83, II/2 (ca.1667)
Performed by Phillip W. Serna, Treble, Tenor & Bass Viols

Jenkins was a long-active and prolific composer whose many years of life, spanning the time from William Byrd to Henry Purcell, witnessed great changes in English music. He is noted for developing the viol consort fantasia, being influenced in the 1630s by an earlier generation of English composers including Alfonso Ferrabosco the younger, Thomas Lupo, John Coprario and Orlando Gibbons. Jenkins composed numerous 4, 5, and 6 part fantasias for viol consort, almans, courants and pavanes, and he breathed new life into the antiquated form of the In Nomine. He was less experimental than his friend William Lawes; indeed, Jenkins's music was more conservative than that of many of his contemporaries. It is characterised by a sensuous lyricism, highly skilled craftsmanship, and an original usage of tonality and counterpoint.

The musicologist Wilfrid Mellers claimed that J. S. Bach's Orchestral Suites No. 3 and No. 4 in D major (BWV 1068–69) recalled the sensibility of the physician-philosopher Sir Thomas Browne; however, the melancholic pavans, meditative fantasias and vigorous allemands of Jenkins are closer in era, antique style and temperament, to his Norfolk contemporary than Bach. Jenkins may even have socially met or performed in the presence of Browne while employed in his retirement years by Sir Philip Wodehouse of Kimberley as correspondence between Browne and Wodehouse survives.

== Table of works ==
| Title (key is nominal) | Year written (mostly circa) | Scoring (unless needed for title) | Cat. ref. | Remarks |
|---|---|---|---|---|
| In nomine 1 (in e) | 1630 | for 6 Viols (Trebles, Tenors, Basses) and Organ | MB39/13 | - |
| In nomine 2 (in g) | 1630 | for 6 Viols (Trebles, Tenors, Basses) and Organ | MB39/14 | - |
| Air for 4-Part Viol Consort | 1650 | - | ChChMus 367-70/35 | VdGS 1 |
| Pavan for 4-Part Viol Consort | 1650 | - | ChChMus 367-70/34 | VdGS 45 |
| Pavan and Galliard “Newarke Seidge” | 1646 | for 4 Viols | MB26 | - |
| Pavan 1 “Bell” (in a) | 1630 | for 6 Viols (Trebles, Tenors, Basses) and Organ | MB39/15 | - |
| Pavan 2 (in F) | 1630 | for 6 Viols (Trebles, Tenors, Basses) and Organ | MB39/16 | - |
| Fantasy 07 (in c) for 4 Viols | 1650 | - | MB26 | - |
| Fantasy 09 (in c) for 4 Viols | 1650 | - | MB26 | - |
| Fantasy 12 (in D) for 4 Viols | 1650 | - | MB26 | - |
| Fantasy 15 (in C) for 4 Viols | 1650 | - | MB26 | - |
| Fantasy 16 (in d) for 4 Viols | 1650 | - | MB26 | - |

== Discography ==
- Consort Music

Ars Nova, dir. Peter Holman, Meridian E 77020 (1978)

- Consort Music

The Consort of Music, dir. Trevor Jones, Decca (1983)

- Consort Music for Viols in Six Parts

Hespèrion XX, Astrée E 8724 (1991)

- All in a Garden Green: Pavan, Newarke Seidge, 4-Part Ayres, Fantasia-Suite

Rose Consort of Viols, Naxos 8.550687 (1993)

- Six Airs: Almain, Pavane, Courante, Courante, Almain, Almain

Double Reed Ensemble of New York Kammermusicker, Dorian DOR-90189 (1995)

- The Mirrour and Wonder of his Age: John Jenkins Consort Music

Fretwork, Virgin 7243 5 45230 2 1 (1996)

- Fantasias

Les Voix Humaines, Atma ACD2 2205 (2001)

- Fantazia

Ensemble Jérôme Hantaï, Naive-Astrée E 8895 (2004)

- Five-Part Consorts

Phantasm, Avie (2007)

- Six-Part Consorts

Phantasm, Avie (2008)

- Music for the Viol Lyra-Way

Jonathan Dunford, Lyra-Viol (2014)

- Four-Part Consort Music

Fretwork, Signum SIGCD 528 (year unknown)
