= Silvestro Ganassi dal Fontego =

Venetian musician

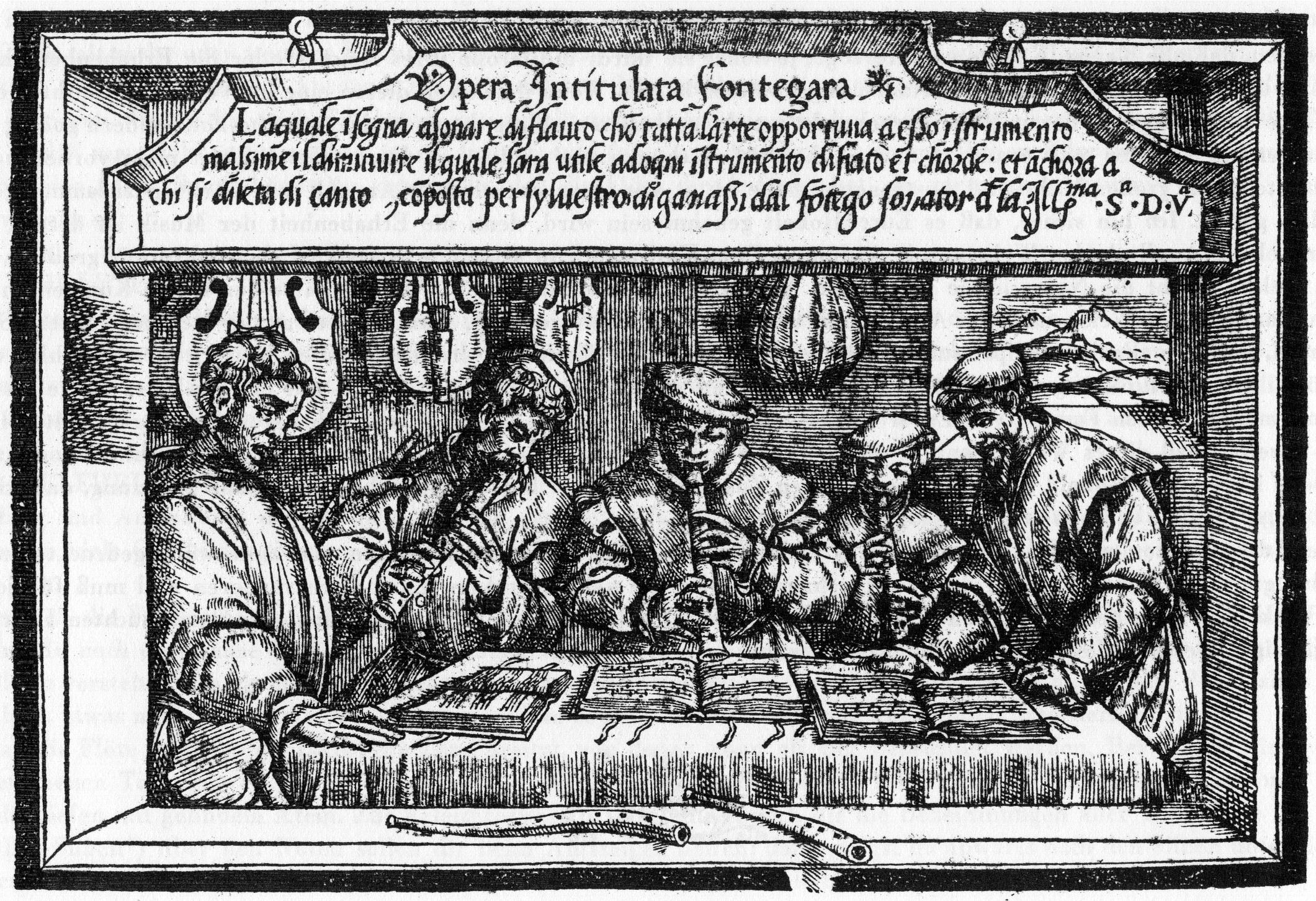
La Fontegara

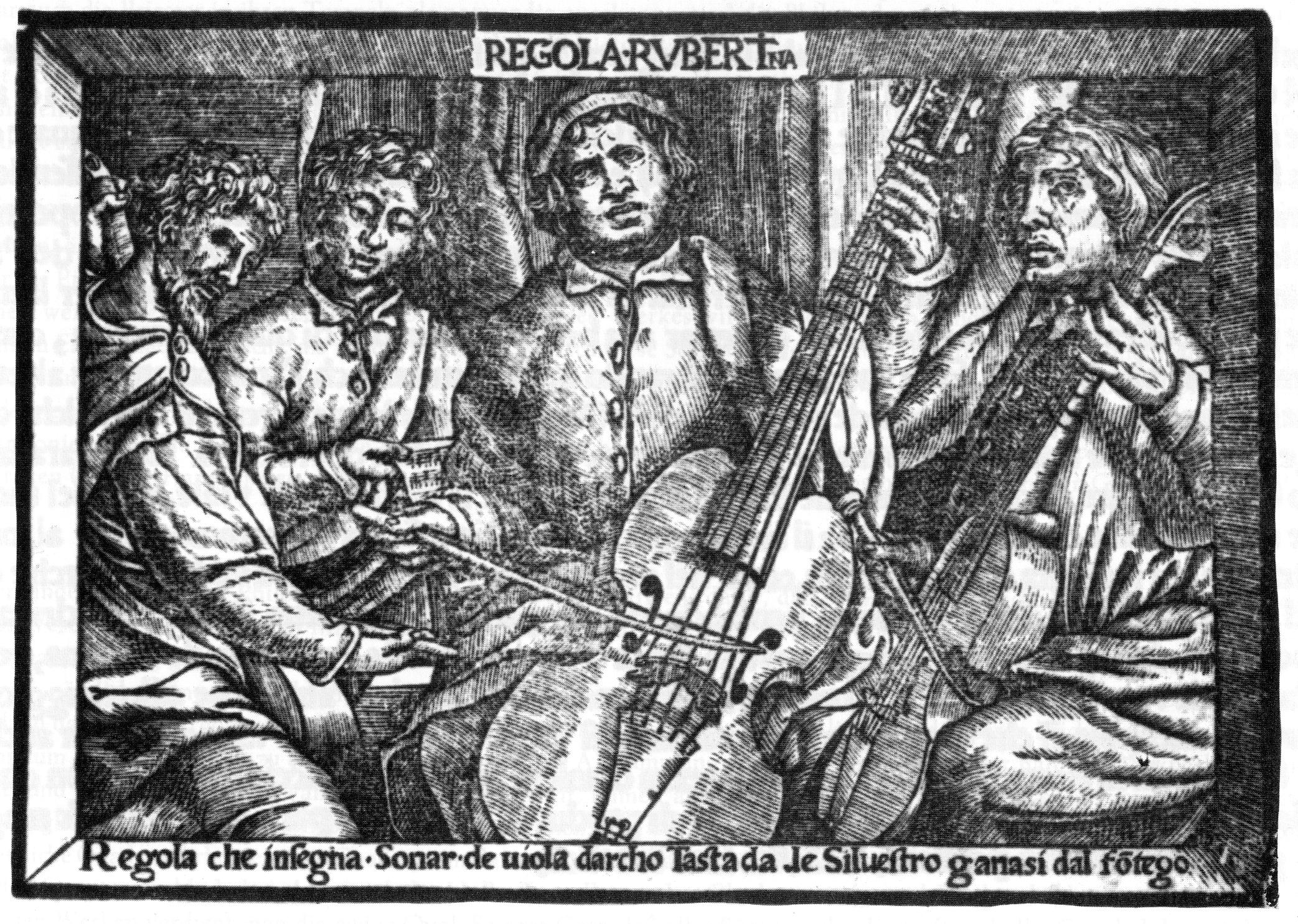
Regola Rubertina

Silvestro di Ganassi dal Fontego, also given as Sylvestro di Ganassi dal Fontego, Silvestro Ganasi dal Fontego, and Silvestro dal Fontego (1 January 1492 – 1565) was a Venetian musician and author of two important treatises on instrumental technique.

His first treatise covers recorder playing: Opera intitulata Fontegara (Venice, 1535). His second (in two volumes) is about the viola da gamba: Regola Rubertina (Venice, 1542) and Lettione Seconda (Venice, 1543). They cover both technicalities of playing and the subtleties of expression. There is also guidance on ornamentation—passaggi.

The revival of interest in historically aware musical performance has resulted in renewed interest in Ganassi's writings. His treatises are now available in modern editions.

== Viol technique ==
Ganassi's Regola Rubertina is among the earliest sources of advice to the viol player on how to hold the bow. In Chapter III, Ganassi says:

You know that the bow is to be held with three fingers, that is to say the thumb, the index and middle fingers. The thumb and middle finger ensure, in holding the bow, that it does not fall, and the index finger serves to strengthen and stabilize it, keeping it on the strings and exerting more or less pressure according to the need.

The illustration from Regola Rubertina (lower right, opposite) appears to show this hold. Some interpretations of this passage conclude that the bow is to be held without touching the hair, whereas in later bow-holds the fingers tension the hair in order to allow louder or accented playing without the stick of the bow hitting the string. In a later passage, however, Ganassi makes it clear that the hair may be tensioned with the fingers in at least some circumstances, for example when playing chords to accompany a song:

I can say that if you wished to play a piece which is in four or five parts while singing the fifth, you would need to use a longer bow than is customarily used. This is because the hairs on a longer bow would be less stretched, allowing one to draw the bow with less pressure on the strings while playing a chord. Then you could use the fingers to stretch the hairs when playing fewer strings or a single string.

== Discography ==
- 2000: Wordplay - Madrigals and chansons in virtuosic instrumental settings from 16th century Italy, Musica Antiqua of London directed by Philip Thorby
- 2001: Harmonice Musices Odhecaton A, Les Flamboyants (Michael Form)
- 2008: Sylvestro Ganassi: Io amai sempre, Pierre Boragno & Marianne Muller & Massimo Moscardo & François Saint-Yves, Outhere
- 2011: Glosas: Embellished Renaissance Music, More Hispano (Vicente Parrilla), Carpe Diem
- 2015: Discorsi delle comete, Ensemble Daimonion
- 2016: Philippe Verdelot, Silvestro Ganassi : Madrigali Diminuiti, Doulce Mémoire (Denis Raisin Dadre), Ricercar
- 2018: Co’l dolce suono, Ensemble arcimboldo (Thilo Hirsch)
- 2018: La Fontegara, Le Concert Brisé (William Dongois), Ricercar
- 2019: Florid early baroque songs and polyphony, ensemble Cantate Violini

== Sources ==
- Crum, Alison: Play the viol (Oxford: Oxford University Press, 1989) ISBN 0-19-317422-7.
- Ganassi, Silvestro: Regola Rubertina and Lettione Seconda (Venice, 1542–3), translated by Richard Bodig (S.l.: Saraband Music, 2002) ISBN 1-876571-13-6.
- Pio, Stefano: Liuteria veneziana, 1490–1630 / Viol and Lute makers of Venice 1490–1630, English translation by Marina De Marchi and Robert Schoen (Venice: Venice Research, 2011) ISBN 9788897039617.
