= Viol =

Bowed, fretted and stringed instrument

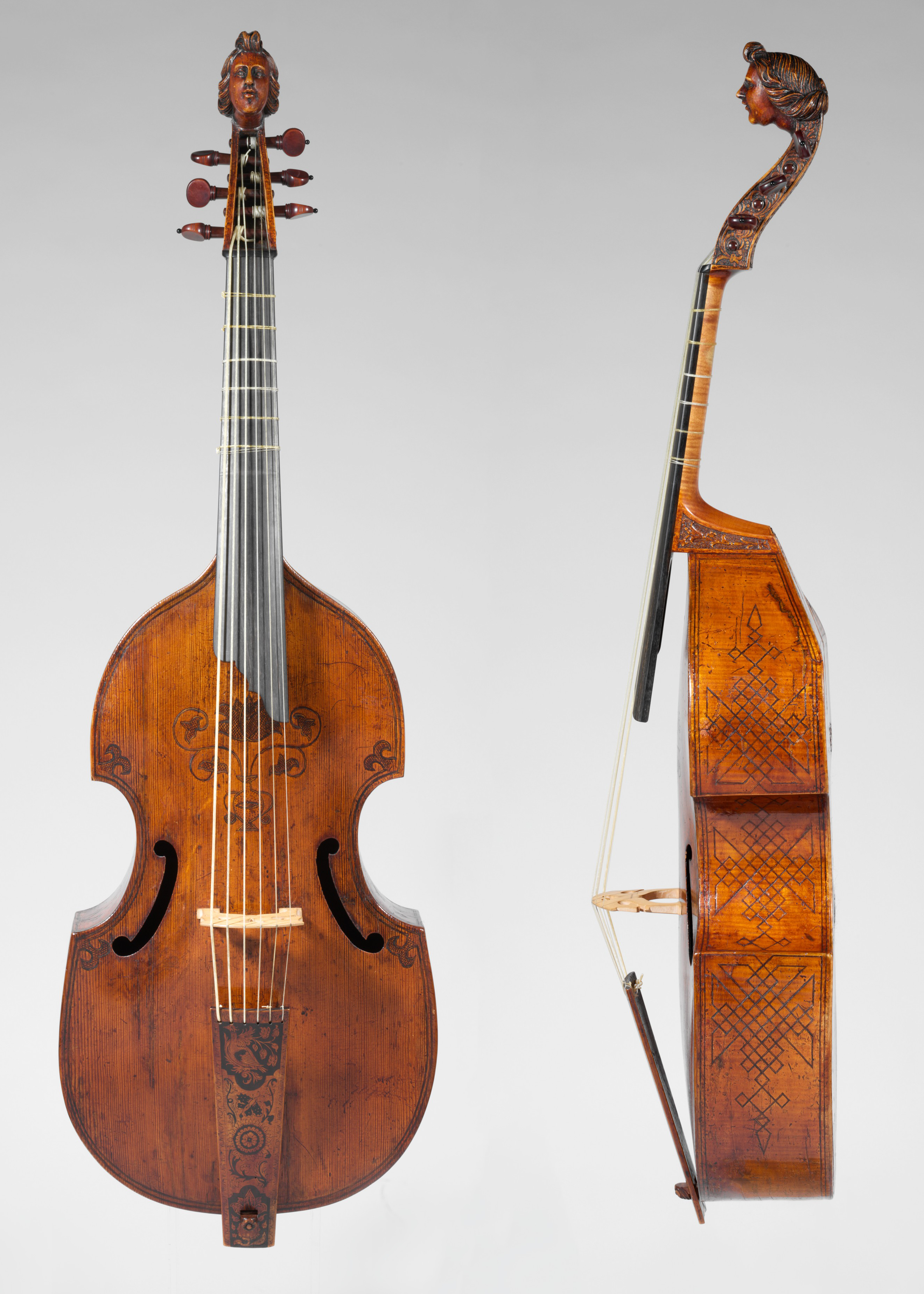

String instrument
- Other names: Viola da gamba gamba (informal)
- Hornbostel–Sachs classification: 321.322-71 (Composite chordophone sounded by a bow)
- Developed: Spain, late 15th century from the vihuela

Related instruments
- Arpeggione; Bass guitar; Byzantine lyra; Guitar; Lute; Vihuela; Violone

Sound sample
- Carl Friedrich Abel (1723–1787) – From 27 Pieces for Unaccompanied Viola da Gamba, New York. NYp, Drexel 5871 (ca. 1790–99): [Arpeggio], AbelWV A1:A26 Performed by Phillip W. Serna, viol

The viol (also viola da gamba, Italian: [ˈvjɔːla da (ɡ)ˈɡamba, viˈɔːla -], or informally gamba) is a family of bowed, fretted string instruments that developed in Spain in the late 15th century, particularly in Valencia within the Crown of Aragon, and subsequently spread to Italy and other parts of Europe. Most viols have six strings tuned primarily in fourths, with a third in the middle, and are played upright, with the instrument held on or between the legs—hence the Italian name viola da gamba, meaning "leg viol".

Viols are distinguished from instruments of the violin family by features including their frets, tuning, generally flat backs and sloping shoulders, and the use of an underhand bow grip. The family developed in several sizes, most commonly treble, tenor and bass, and became widely used during the Renaissance and Baroque periods as solo, consort and continuo instruments.

The early development of the viol was closely connected with the vihuela, a family of Spanish string instruments that could be played with the fingers, a plectrum or a bow. Bowed vihuelas were established in the Crown of Aragon by the late 15th century and contributed to the emergence of the viol family, which underwent further development in Italy during the 16th century.

The term viola da gamba may refer to the viol family as a whole, although without qualification it commonly refers to the bass viol. Viols remained prominent in European art music through the 17th and 18th centuries before declining in use, and were revived in the 20th century as part of the historically informed performance movement.

== History ==
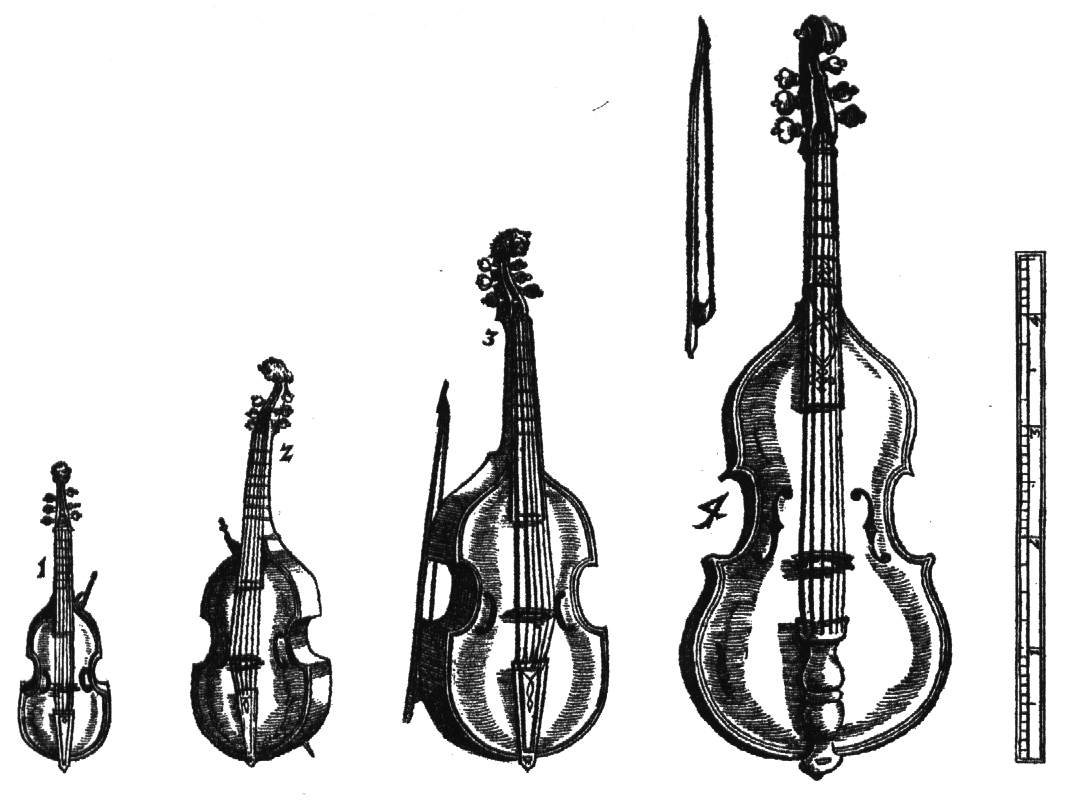
Four viols (1618)

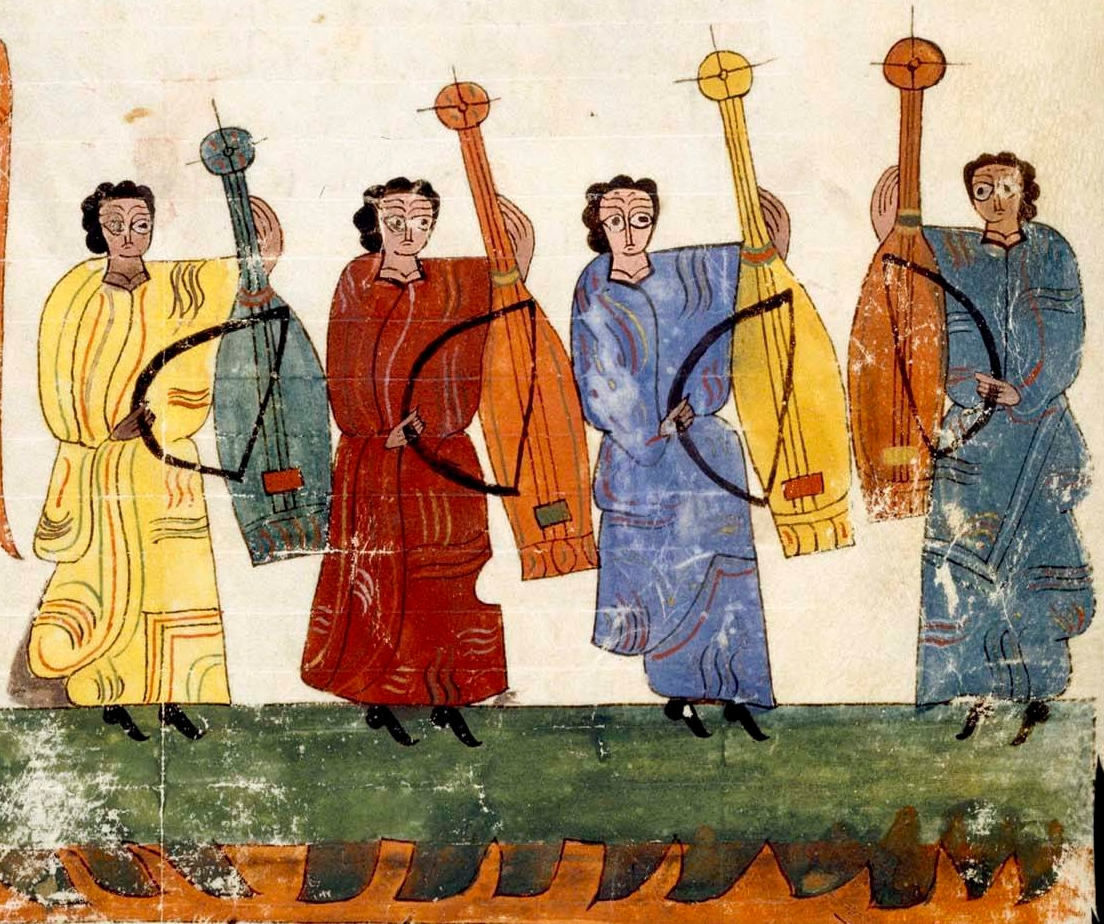
Spanish instruments from before the name viol or vihuela were coined, played with a bow. From Commentary on the Apocalypse, Codice VITR 14.1, "second third of 10th century".

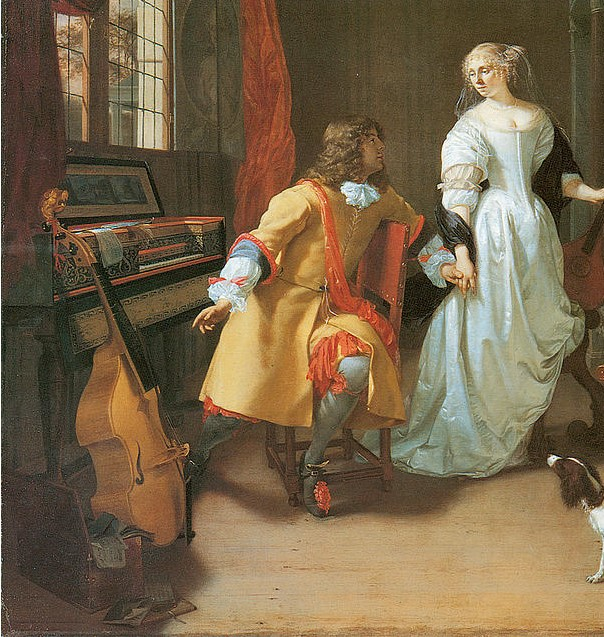
Detail from a painting by Jan Verkolje, Dutch, c. 1674, Elegant Couple (A Musical Interlude). The theme is similar to the classic Music Lesson genre, and features a bass viol, virginal, and cittern (in the woman's hand, out of frame in this detail; see full image). This image highlights the domestic amateur class of viol players.

Vihuelists began playing their flat-topped, originally plucked, instruments with a bow in the second half of the 15th century. Within two or three decades, this led to the evolution of an entirely new and dedicated bowed string instrument that retained many of the features of the vihuela: e.g., a flat back, sharp waist-cuts, frets, thin ribs initially, and identical tuning—hence its original name, vihuela de arco; arco is Spanish for "bow". An influence on the playing posture has been credited to the example of Moorish rabab players.

However, Stefano Pio (2012) argues that a re-examination of documents in light of new data indicates an origin different than the vihuela de arco from Aragon. According to Pio, the viol had its origins in Venice, and evolved independently there. He asserts it was implausible that the vihuela de arco underwent such a rapid evolution by Italian rather than Venetian instrument makers. Nonetheless, a ten-year span brought the birth and diffusion in Italy of a new family of instruments (viola da gamba, or viols). These comprised instruments of different sizes, some as large as the famous violoni—as 'big as a man'—mentioned by Prospero Bernardino in 1493.

Pio also notes that the fifth string of the viola da gamba is uniquely called a bordone (drone)—both in the manuscript of the early 15th-century music theorist Antonius de Leno, and in the treatises of the Venetian Silvestro Ganassi dal Fontego and Giovanni Maria Lanfranco. However, it is not a drone and is played the same as the other strings. This inconsistency is justified, Pio argues, only by assuming the invention (in the latter 15th century) of a larger instrument derived from the medieval violetta, which gradually added more strings to allow greater extension to the low register. The fifth string was incorporated into the neck. This was surpassed by a sixth string (basso) which fixed the lower sound produced by the instrument. Pio's view was: the origin of the viola da gamba is tied to the evolution of the smaller violetta, or vielle, which was originally fitted with a fifth-string "drone"; and the name 'stuck' even after it ceased to perform this function.

Ian Woodfield, in his The Early History of the Viol, points to evidence that the viol does start with the vihuela, but that Italian luthiers immediately began to apply their own highly developed instrument-making traditions to the early version of the instrument after it was introduced into Italy.

== Construction ==
Dutch viols overseas

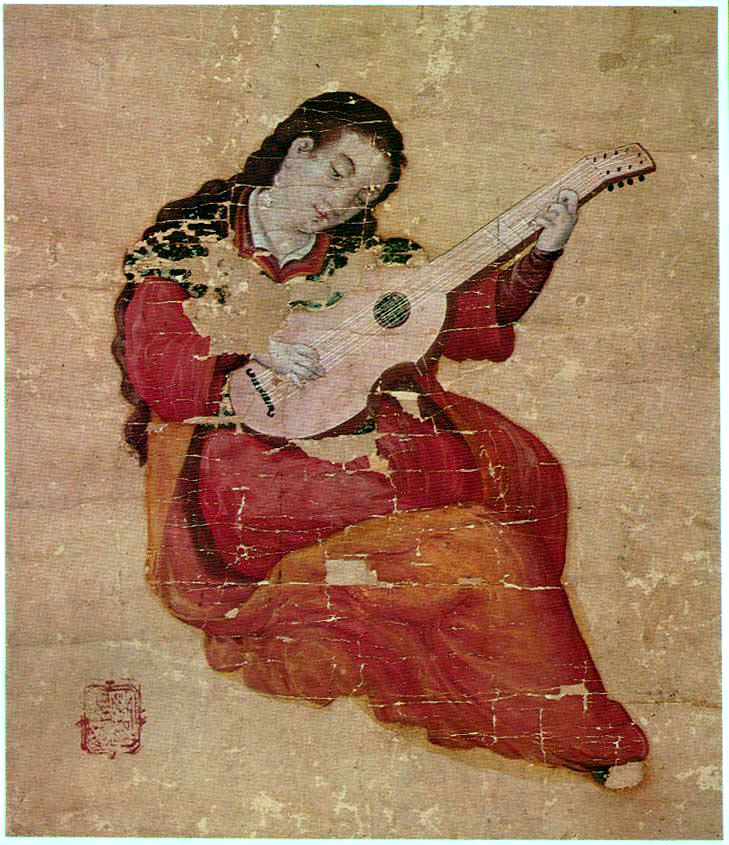
Late 16th or early 17th-century viol from a Japanese painting. Has four courses of strings.

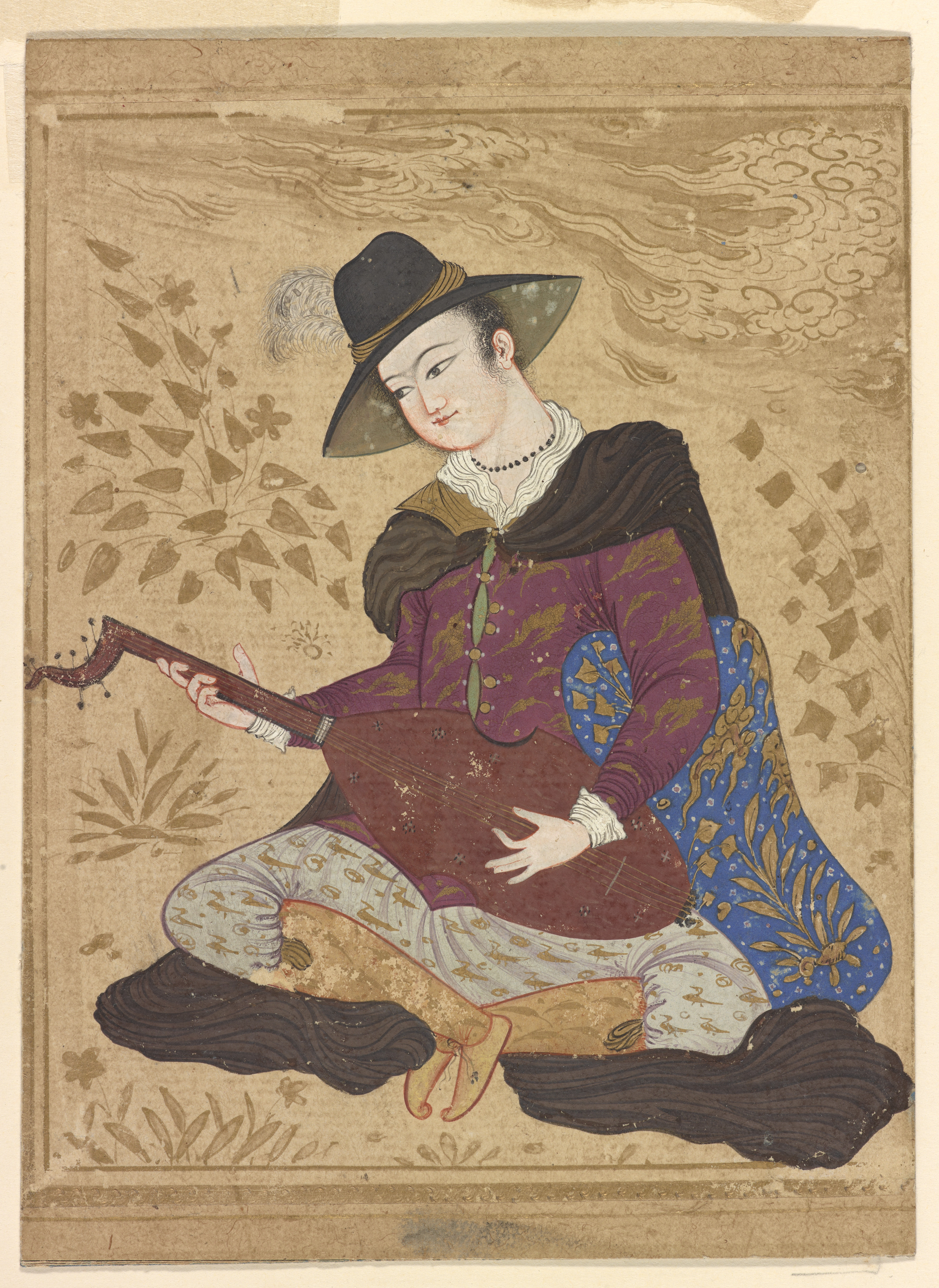
Painting by Reza Abbasi c. 1634, showing a musician dressed in European clothing, playing what may be a viol. The instrument has Persian-style soundholes and a thinner neck than the instrument in the Japanese painting.

In places where European ships landed in the 16 and 17th centuries, painters illustrated them playing musical instruments.

Bass viol c. 1700, at St Cecilia's Hall, Edinburgh

Viols most commonly have six strings, although many 16th-century instruments had only four or five strings, and during the 17th century in France, some bass viols featured a seventh lower string. Viols were (and are) strung with gut strings of lower tension than on the members of the violin family. Gut strings produce a sonority far different from steel, generally described as softer and sweeter. Around 1660 in Bologna, gut or silk core strings overspun with copper wire first became available; these were then used for the lowest-pitched bass strings on viols, and many other string instruments as well. In 1664, a style of string incorporating a copper wire spun within the gut fibers, called a 'gimped' string, was introduced, mimicking the style of embroidery of the same name.

Viols are fretted like early guitars or lutes, using movable wrapped-around and tied-on gut frets. A low seventh string was supposedly added in France to the bass viol by Monsieur de Sainte-Colombe (c. 1640–1690), whose students included the French gamba virtuoso and composer Marin Marais. Also, the painting Saint Cecilia with an Angel (1618) by Domenichino (1581–1641) shows what may be a seven-string viol.

Unlike members of the violin family, most of which are tuned in fifths, viols are usually tuned in fourths with a major third in the middle, mirroring the tuning employed on the vihuela de mano and lute during the 16th century and similar to that of the modern six-string guitar.

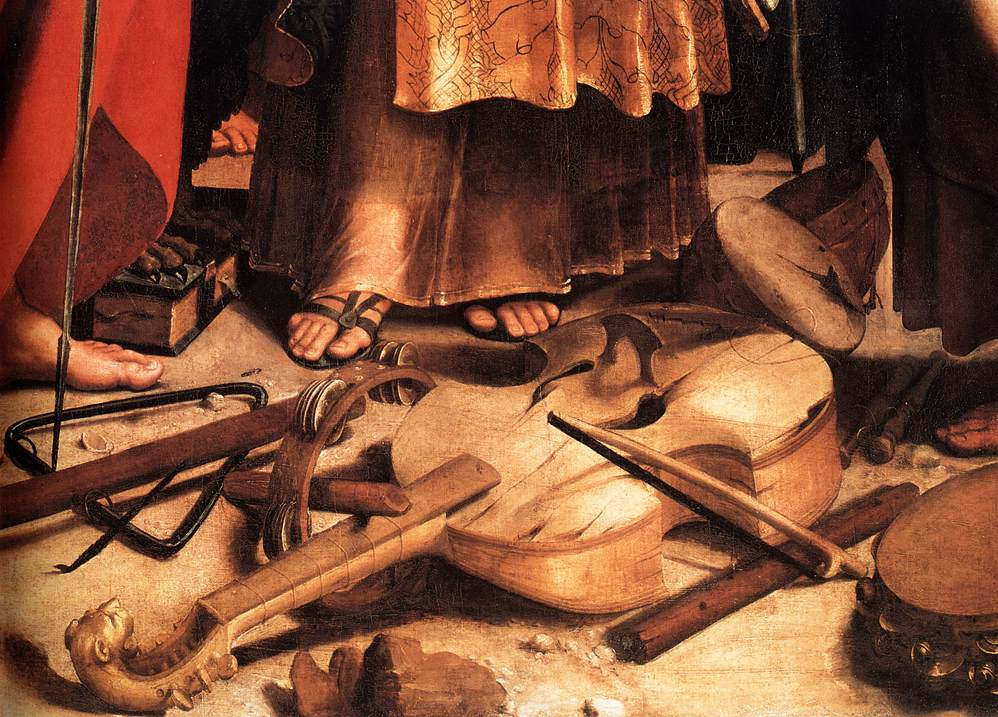
Early Italian tenor viola da gamba, detail from the painting St. Cecilia, by Raphael, c. 1510

Viols were first constructed much like the vihuela de mano, with all surfaces, top, back, and sides made from flat slabs or pieces of joined wood, bent or curved as required. However, some viols, both early and later, had carved tops, similar to those more commonly associated with instruments of the violin family. The ribs or sides of early viols were usually quite shallow, reflecting more the construction of their plucked vihuela counterparts. Rib depth increased during the 16th century, finally coming to resemble the greater depth of the classic 17th-century pattern.

The flat backs of most viols have a sharply angled break or canted bend in their surface close to where the neck meets the body. This serves to taper the back (and overall body depth) at its upper end to meet the back of the neck joint flush with its heel. Traditional construction uses animal glue, and internal joints are often reinforced with strips of either linen or vellum soaked in hot animal glue—a practice also employed in early plucked vihuela construction. The peg boxes of viols (which hold the tuning pegs) were typically decorated either with elaborately carved heads of animals or people or with the now-familiar spiral scroll finial.

The earliest vihuelas and viols, both plucked and bowed, all had sharp cuts to their waists, similar to the profile of a modern violin. This was a key and new feature—first appearing in the mid-15th century—and from then on, it was employed on many different types of string instruments. This feature was also key in seeing and understanding the connection between the plucked and bowed versions of early vihuelas. If one were to go searching for very early viols with smooth-curved figure-eight bodies, like those found on the only slightly later plucked vihuelas and the modern guitar, they would be out of luck. By the mid-16th century, however, "guitar-shaped" viols were fairly common, and a few of them survive.

The earliest viols had flat, glued-down bridges just like their plucked counterpart vihuelas. Soon after, however, viols adopted the wider and high-arched bridge that facilitated the bowing of single strings. The earliest of viols would also have had the ends of their fretboards flat on the deck, level with or resting upon the top or soundboard. Once the end of their fretboards was elevated above the top of the instrument's face, the entire top could vibrate freely. Early viols did not have sound posts, either (again reflecting their plucked vihuela siblings). This reduced damping again meant that their tops could vibrate more freely, contributing to the characteristic "humming" sound of viols. However, the absence of a sound post also resulted in a quieter and softer voice overall.

It is commonly believed that C-holes (a type and shape of pierced sound port visible on the top face or belly of string instruments) are a definitive feature of viols, a feature used to distinguish viols from instruments in the violin family, which typically had F-shaped holes. This generality, however, renders an incomplete picture. The earliest viols had either large, open, round, sound holes (or even round pierced rosettes like those found on lutes and vihuelas), or they had some kind of C-holes. Viols sometimes had as many as four small C-holes—one placed in each corner of the bouts—but more commonly, they had two. The two C-holes might be placed in the upper bouts, centrally, or in the lower bouts. In the formative years, C-holes were most often placed facing each other or turned inwards.

In addition to round or C-holes, however, and as early as the first quarter of the 16th century, some viols adopted S-shaped holes, again facing inward. By the mid-16th century, S-holes morphed into the classic F-shaped holes, which were then used by viols and members of the violin family alike. By the mid-to late 16th century, the viol's C-holes facing direction were reversed, becoming outward-facing. That configuration then became a standard feature of what we today call the "classic" 17th-century pattern. Yet another style of sound holes found on some viols was a pair of flame-shaped Arabesques placed left and right. The lute- and vihuela-like round or oval ports or rosettes became a standard feature of viols made in the Holy Roman Empire (modern day Germany and Austria). That feature was retained in most German and Austrian viols to the very end and served as a reminder of the viol's more ancient plucked vihuela roots, or the "luteness" of viols.

Historians, makers, and players generally distinguish between renaissance and baroque viols. The latter are more heavily constructed and are fitted with a bass bar and sound post, like modern stringed instruments.

=== Viol bows ===
The bow is held underhand with the palm facing upward, similar to a German double bass bow grip, but away from the frog towards the balance point. The stick's curvature is generally convex as were violin bows of the period, rather than concave like a modern violin bow. The "frog" (which holds the bow hair and adjusts its tension) is also different from that of modern bows: whereas a violin bow frog has a "slide" (often made of mother of pearl), which pinches the hair and holds it flat and stationary across the frog, viol bows have an open frog that allows more movement of the hair. This facilitates a traditional playing technique where the performer uses one or two fingers of the bow hand to press the hair away from the bow stick. This dynamically increases bow hair tension to control articulation and inflection.

== Different versions ==
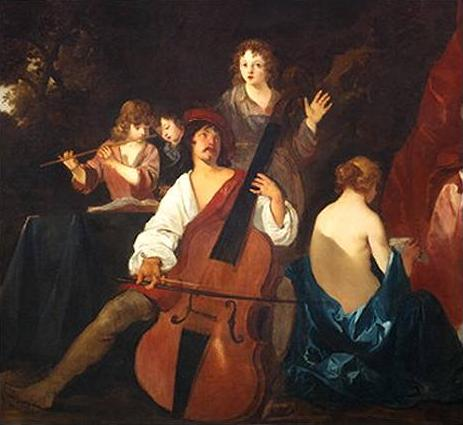
Violone or great bass viol. Painting by Sir Peter Lely, c. 1640, Dutch-born English Baroque era painter. Note the Italianate shape, square shoulders, and F-holes, apart from its massive size.

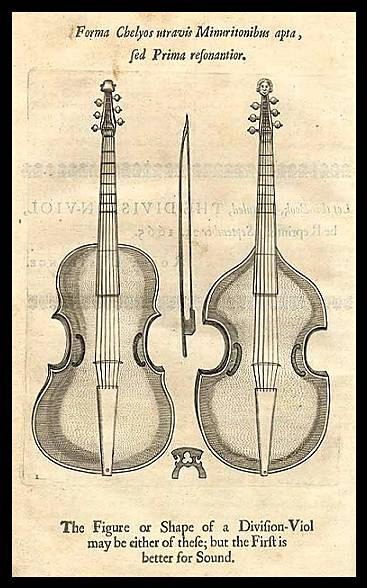
Plate from Christopher Simpson's book, The Division Violist, England, 1659–1667 edition

Viols come in seven sizes: "pardessus de viole" (which is relatively rare, exclusively French and did not exist before the 18th century), treble (dessus in French), alto, tenor (in French taille), bass, great bass, and contrabass (the final two are often called violone, meaning large viol), the smaller one tuned an octave below the tenor (violone in G, sometimes called great bass or in French grande basse) and the larger one tuned an octave below the bass (violone in D, or the contrabass viol). This latter instrument is not to be confused with the double bass.

Their tuning (see next section) alternates G and D instruments: pardessus in G, treble in D, tenor in G, bass in D (the seven-string bass was a French invention, with an added low A), small violone in G, large violone in D and the alto (between the treble and the tenor).

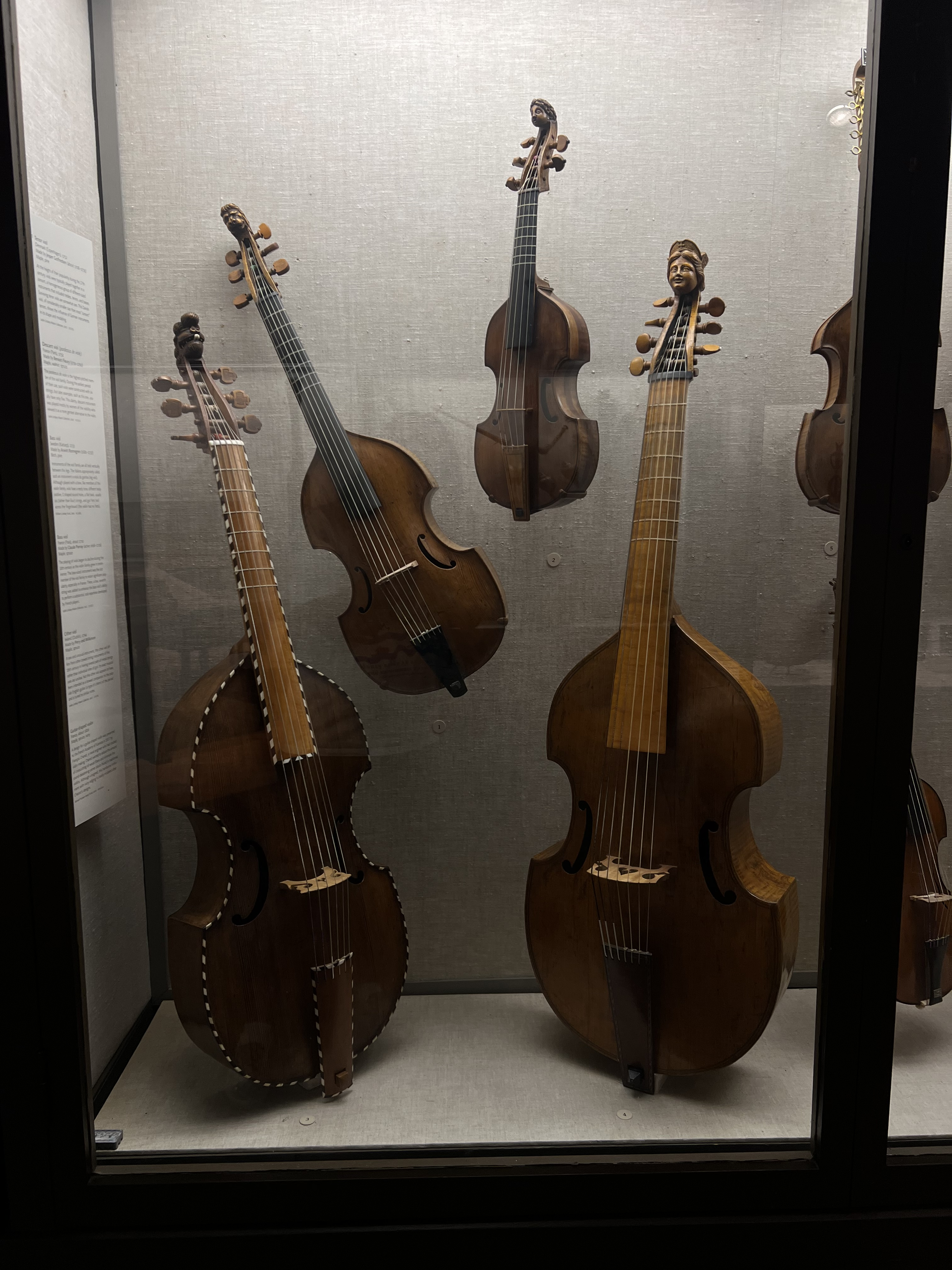
Different sizes of viols in the Museum of Fine Arts, Boston

The treble has a size similar to a viola but with a deeper body; the typical bass is about the size of a cello. The pardessus and the treble were held vertically in the lap. The English made smaller basses known as division viols, and the still-smaller Lyra viol. The viola bastarda was a similar type of viol used in Italy for a virtuosic style of viol repertoire and performance. German consort basses were larger than the French instruments designed for continuo.

Those instruments were not all equally common. The typical Elizabethan consort of viols was composed of six instruments: two basses, two tenors and two trebles, or one bass, three tenors and two trebles (see Chest of viols). Thus the bass, tenor and treble were the central members of the family as far as music written specifically for viols is concerned. Besides consort playing, the bass could also be used as a solo instrument (there were also smaller basses designed especially for a virtuosic solo role, namely the division viol, lyra viol, and viola bastarda) or could serve as a continuo bass. The pardessus was a French 18th-century instrument that was introduced to allow ladies to play mostly violin or flute music (Note: The violin and the flute were not considered appropriate for ladies; no longer, in the case of the violin, as in the 17th century, because of its popular origins and association with people who made a living playing music, but because the physical effort required to hold the violin a braccio or to play the flute were not considered lady-like.) but eventually acquired its own repertoire. The alto was a relatively rare smaller version of the tenor. The violones were rarely part of the consort of viols but functioned as the bass or contrabass of all kinds of instrumental combinations.

== Tuning ==
The standard tuning of most viols is in fourths with a major third in the middle (like the standard Renaissance lute tuning), or in fourths with a major third in between the 2nd and 3rd strings (like a modern guitar). The following table shows the tunings that have been adopted at least somewhat widely during the 20th and 21st-century revival of the viols. (Lyra viol tunings are not included.)

Viol tuning
Instrument	Strings (low to high)							Harmonic relation (low to high)
Instrument	7	6	5	4	3	2	1	Harmonic relation (low to high)
Pardessus (5-string) (Note: The pardessus de viole most often has only five strings, but six-string instruments are not uncommon.)			G_{3}	D_{4}	A_{4}	D_{5}	G_{5}	5th, 5th, 4th, 4th
Pardessus (6-string)		G_{3}	C_{4}	E_{4}	A_{4}	D_{5}	G_{5}	4th, Maj3rd, 4th, 4th, 4th
Treble		D_{3}	G_{3}	C_{4}	E_{4}	A_{4}	D_{5}	4th, 4th, Maj3rd, 4th, 4th
Alto		C_{3}	F_{3}	A_{3}	D_{4}	G_{4}	C_{5}	4th, Maj3rd, 4th, 4th, 4th
Tenor in A		A_{2}	D_{3}	G_{3}	B_{3}	E_{4}	A_{4}	4th, 4th, Maj3rd, 4th, 4th
Tenor in G		G_{2}	C_{3}	F_{3}	A_{3}	D_{4}	G_{4}	4th, 4th, Maj3rd, 4th, 4th
Bass	A_{1} (Note: The baroque bass viol has either six or seven strings.)	D_{2}	G_{2}	C_{3}	E_{3}	A_{3}	D_{4}	(4th), 4th, 4th, Maj3rd, 4th, 4th
Violone in A		A_{1}	D_{2}	G_{2}	B_{2}	E_{3}	A_{3}	4th, 4th, Maj3rd, 4th, 4th
Violone in G		G_{1}	C_{2}	F_{2}	A_{2}	D_{3}	G_{3}	4th, 4th, Maj3rd, 4th, 4th
Violone in D		D_{1}	G_{1}	C_{2}	E_{2}	A_{2}	D_{3}	4th, 4th, Maj3rd, 4th, 4th

Alternative tunings (called scordatura) were often employed, particularly in the solo lyra viol style of playing, which also made use of many techniques such as chords and pizzicato, not generally used in consort playing. An unusual style of pizzicato was known as a thump. Lyra viol music was also commonly written in tablature. There is a vast repertoire of this music, some by well-known composers and much by anonymous ones.

Much viol music predates the adoption of equal temperament tuning by musicians. The movable nature of the tied-on frets permits the viol player to make adjustments to the tempering of the instrument, and some players and consorts adopt meantone temperaments, which are more suited to Renaissance music. Several fretting schemes involve frets that are spaced unevenly to produce better-sounding chords in a limited number of keys. In some of these schemes, the two strands of the gut that form the fret are separated so that the player can finger a slightly sharper or flatter version of a note (for example G♯ versus A♭) to suit different circumstances.

== Treatises ==
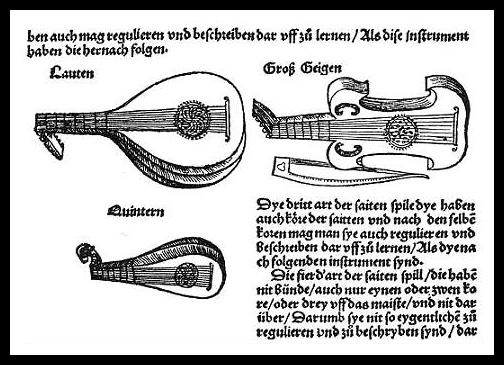
Illustration from German composer Sebastian Virdung's 1511 treatise Musica Getutsch, showing the lute family—plucked and bowed. This is the first printed illustration of a viol in history.

Descriptions and illustrations of viols are found in numerous early 16th-century musical treatises, including those authored by:

- Sebastian Virdung: Musica getutsch, 1511
- Hans Judenkünig: Ain schone kunstliche Vunderwaisung, 1523
- Martin Agricola: Musica instrumentalis deutsch, 1528
- Hans Gerle: Musica Teusch (or Teutsch), 1532

Both Agricola's and Gerle's works were published in various editions.

There were then several important treatises concerning or devoted to the viol. The first was by Silvestro Ganassi dal Fontego: Regola Rubertina & Lettione Seconda (1542/3). Diego Ortiz published Trattado de Glosas (Rome, 1553), an important book of music for the viol with both examples of ornamentation and pieces called Recercadas. In England, Christopher Simpson wrote the most important treatise, with the second edition being published in 1667 in parallel text (English and Latin). This has divisions at the back that are very worthwhile repertoire. A little later, in England, Thomas Mace wrote Musick's Monument, which deals more with the lute but has an important section on the viol. After this, the French treatises by Machy (1685), Rousseau (1687), Danoville (1687), and Étienne Loulié (1700) show further developments in playing technique.

== Popularity ==
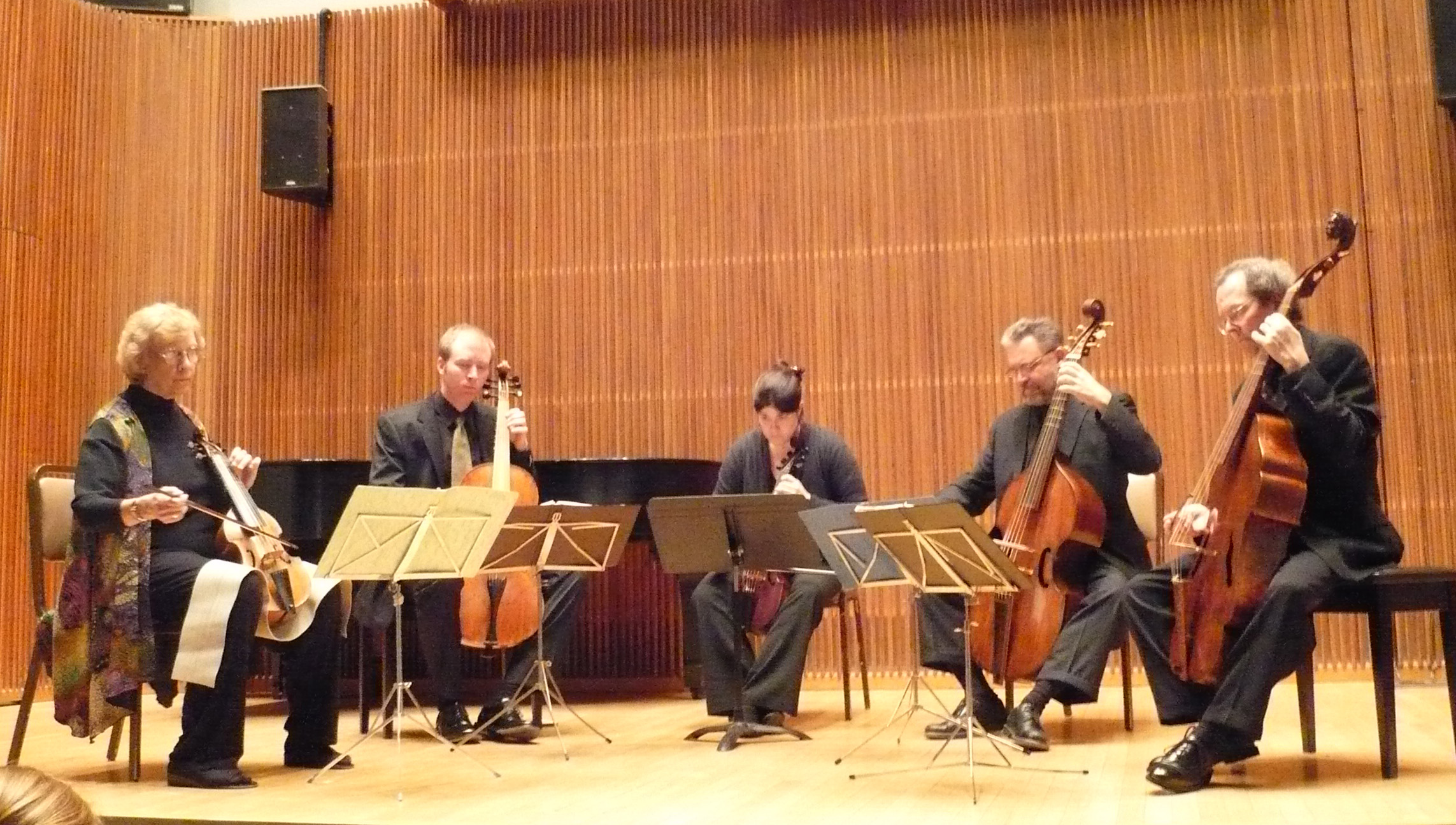
The Smithsonian Consort of Viols, a contemporary viol consort

Carl Friedrich Abel (1723–1787) – Duetto in G major, AbelWV A3:5A from the Maltzan Collection
Performed by ViolMedium – Eric Miller and Phillip W. Serna, viols

Carl Friedrich Abel (1723–1787) – Sonata in G major, AbelWV A3 for unaccompanied viola da gamba. Composed for the Lady Pembroke, London. GB-Lbl, Add.Ms.31697 (1760–1770)
Performed by Phillip W. Serna, viol

Elway Bevin (ca.1554-1638) - Browning à3 from the Baldwin Partbooks, Oxford. Christ Church, Ms.979-83 (ca.1570)

William Byrd (ca.1540–1623) – Prelude & Voluntarie à4 for my Ladye Nevell, My Ladye Nevells Booke, No.26. London. GB-Lbl, MS Mus.1591 (1591)

John Coprario (ca.1570–1626) – Fantasia à2, VdGS No.1, Cambridge. King's College, Rowe Mss.112–113 (ca.1620)

William Daman (ca.1540–1591) – Ut Re Mi Fa Sol La à3 from XX konincklycke fantasien. Mathysz press, Amsterdam (1648)

John Dowland (1563–1626) – M. George Whitehead His Almand, Lachrimae, No.21 (1604)

Leonora Duarte (1610–1678) – Sinfonia à5, No.7 Terti toni, Oxford. Christ College, Mus.Ms.429 (ca.1625–1650)

Michael East (ca.1580–1648) – Both alike, Fancy à2, No.3 from the Seventh Set of Bookes (1638)

Alfonso Ferrabosco the Elder (1543–1588) – Fantasia 'Di Sei Bassi’ from the Sambrook Manuscript, New York. NYp, Drexel 4302, p.255, no.45 (ca.1613–19)

Alfonso Ferrabosco the Younger (ca.1575–1628) – Fantasia 'On the Hexachord' à4, VdGS No.10 – The Hexachord Ascending, Oxford. Christ College, Mus.Ms.436 (ca.1630)
Performed by Phillip W. Serna, treble, tenor and bass viols with violone

Viols were second in popularity only to the lute (although this is disputed), and like lutes, were very often played by amateurs. Affluent homes might have a so-called 'chest of viols', which would contain one or more instruments of each size. Gamba ensembles, called 'consorts', were common in the 16th and 17th centuries, when they performed vocal music (consort songs or verse anthems) as well as that written specifically for instruments. Only the treble, tenor, and bass sizes were regular members of the viol consort, which consisted of three, four, five, or six instruments. Music for consorts was very popular in England in Elizabethan times, with composers such as William Byrd and John Dowland, and, during the reign of King Charles I, John Jenkins, William Lawes and Tobias Hume. The last music for viol consorts before their modern revival was probably written in the early 1680s by Henry Purcell.

Perhaps even more common than the pure consort of viols was the mixed or broken consort (also called Morley consort). Broken consorts combined a mixture of different instruments—a small band, essentially—usually comprising a gathering of social amateurs and typically including such instruments as a bass viol, a lute or orpharion (a wire-strung lute, metal-fretted, flat-backed, and festoon-shaped), a cittern, a treble viol (or violin, as time progressed), sometimes an early keyboard instrument (virginal, spinet, or harpsichord), and whatever other instruments or players (or singers) might be available at the moment. The single most common and ubiquitous pairing of all was always and everywhere the lute and bass viol: for centuries, the inseparable duo.

The bass viola da gamba remained in use into the 18th century as a solo instrument (and to complement the harpsichord in basso continuo). It was a favorite instrument of Louis XIV and acquired associations of both courtliness and "Frenchness" (in contrast to the Italianate violin). Composers such as Marc-Antoine Charpentier, François Couperin, Marin Marais, Sainte Colombe, Johann Sebastian Bach, Johannes Schenck, DuBuisson, Antoine Forqueray, Charles Dollé and Carl Friedrich Abel wrote virtuoso music for it. Georg Philipp Telemann published his Twelve Fantasias for Viola da Gamba solo in 1735, when the instrument was already becoming out of fashion. However, viols fell out of use as concert halls grew larger and the louder and more penetrating tone of the violin family became more popular. In the 20th century, the viola da gamba and its repertoire were revived by early music enthusiasts, an early proponent being Arnold Dolmetsch.

The treble viol in d and the even smaller pardessus de viole in g (often with only five strings) were also popular instruments in the 18th century, especially in France. Composers like Jean-Baptiste Barrière, Georg Phillipp Telemann and Marin Marais wrote solo- and ensemble pieces for treble or pardessus. It was also common to play music for violins or flutes or unspecified top parts on small viols.

Historic viols survive in relatively great number, though very few remain in original condition. They can often be found in collections of historic musical instruments at museums and universities. Here are some of the extant historic viols at The Metropolitan Museum of Art:

- Division Viol by Barak Norman, London, 1692
- Bass Viol, labeled Richard Meares, London, ca. 1680
- Bass Viol by John Rose, ca. 1600, London
- English viol, unsigned, 17th century in spectacularly original condition
- Division Viol, School of Tielke, Hamburg, ca. 1720
- Bass Viol by Matthias Humel, 18th century, Nuremberg
- Bass Viol, Germany, 18th century
- Bass Viol by Nicolas Bertrand, Paris, 1720
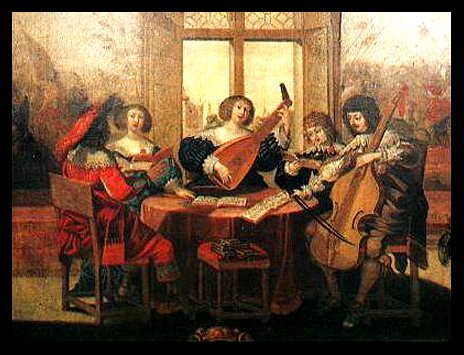
Musical Society by Abraham Bosse, c. 1635; amateur social music making, featuring a lute, bass viol, and singers, with part books spread around the table; representative of one kind of broken consort, albeit with minimal instrumentation.

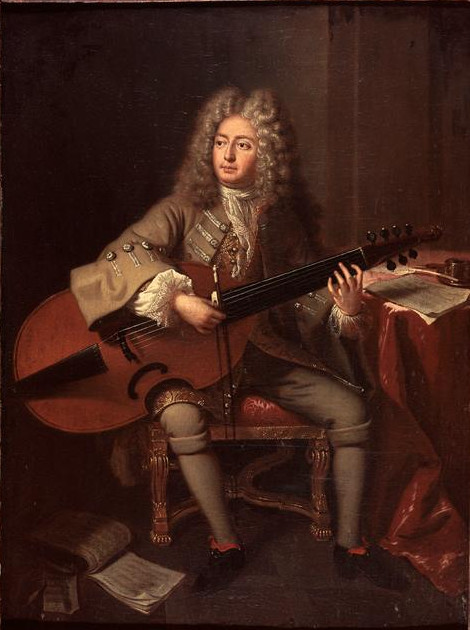
French composer and viola da gamba master Marin Marais, by André Bouys, 1704

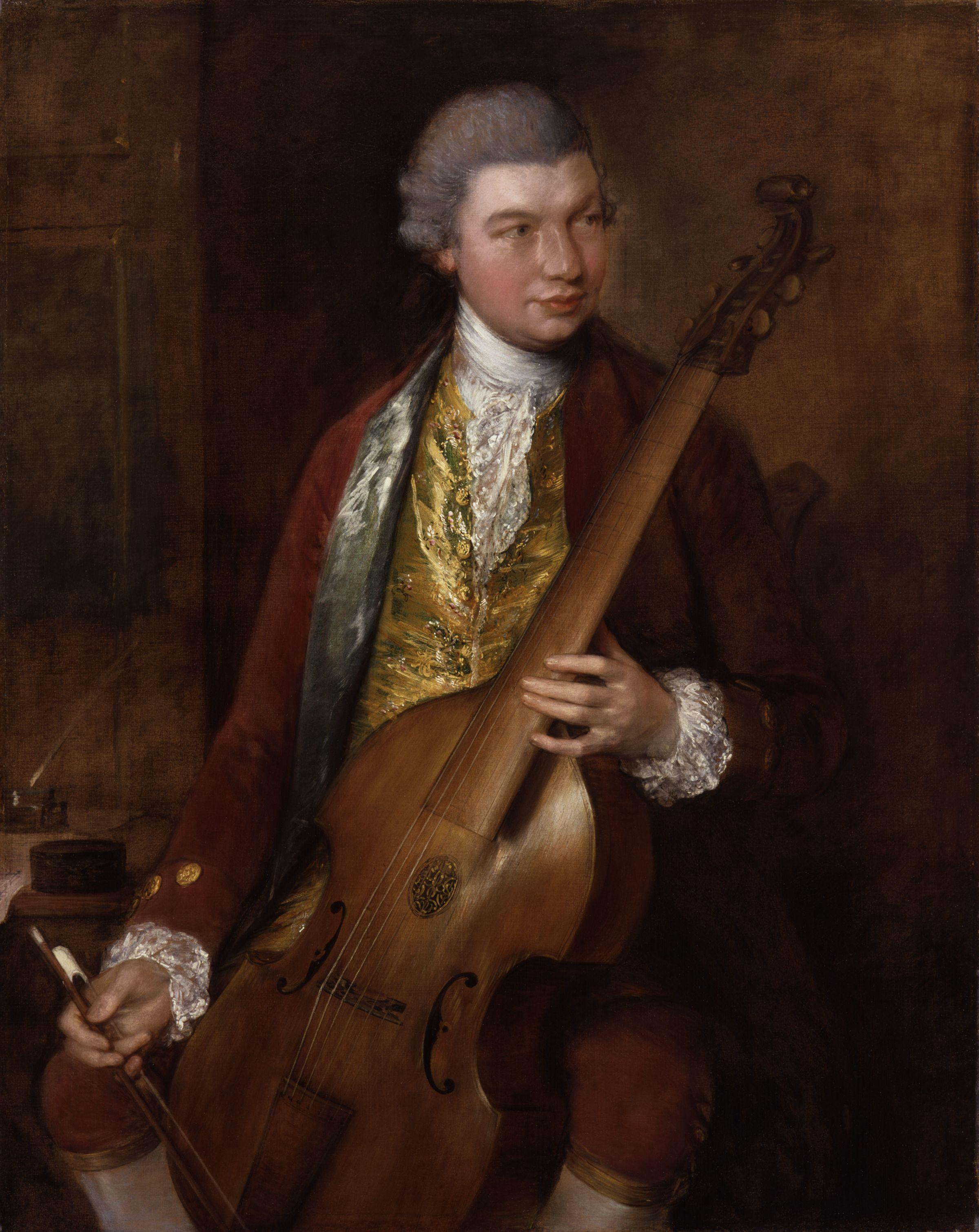
Carl Friedrich Abel, composer and viol master—German-born but residing in England most of his life—posed with his viola da gamba, by Thomas Gainsborough, c. 1765

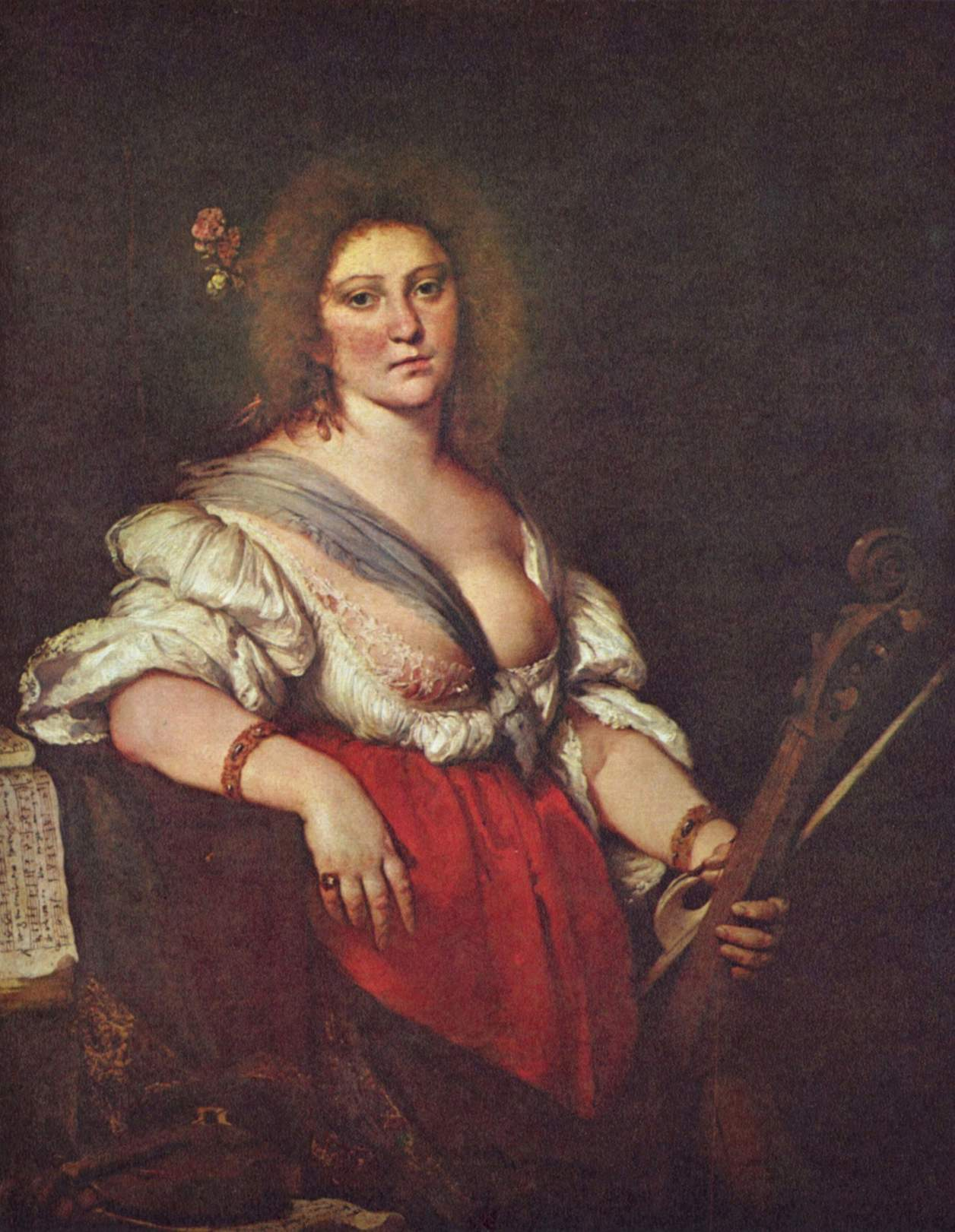
Gambenspielerin (The Viola da gamba Player), by Bernardo Strozzi, c. 1630–1640; portrait of composer Barbara Strozzi (1619–1677), Gemäldegalerie, Dresden

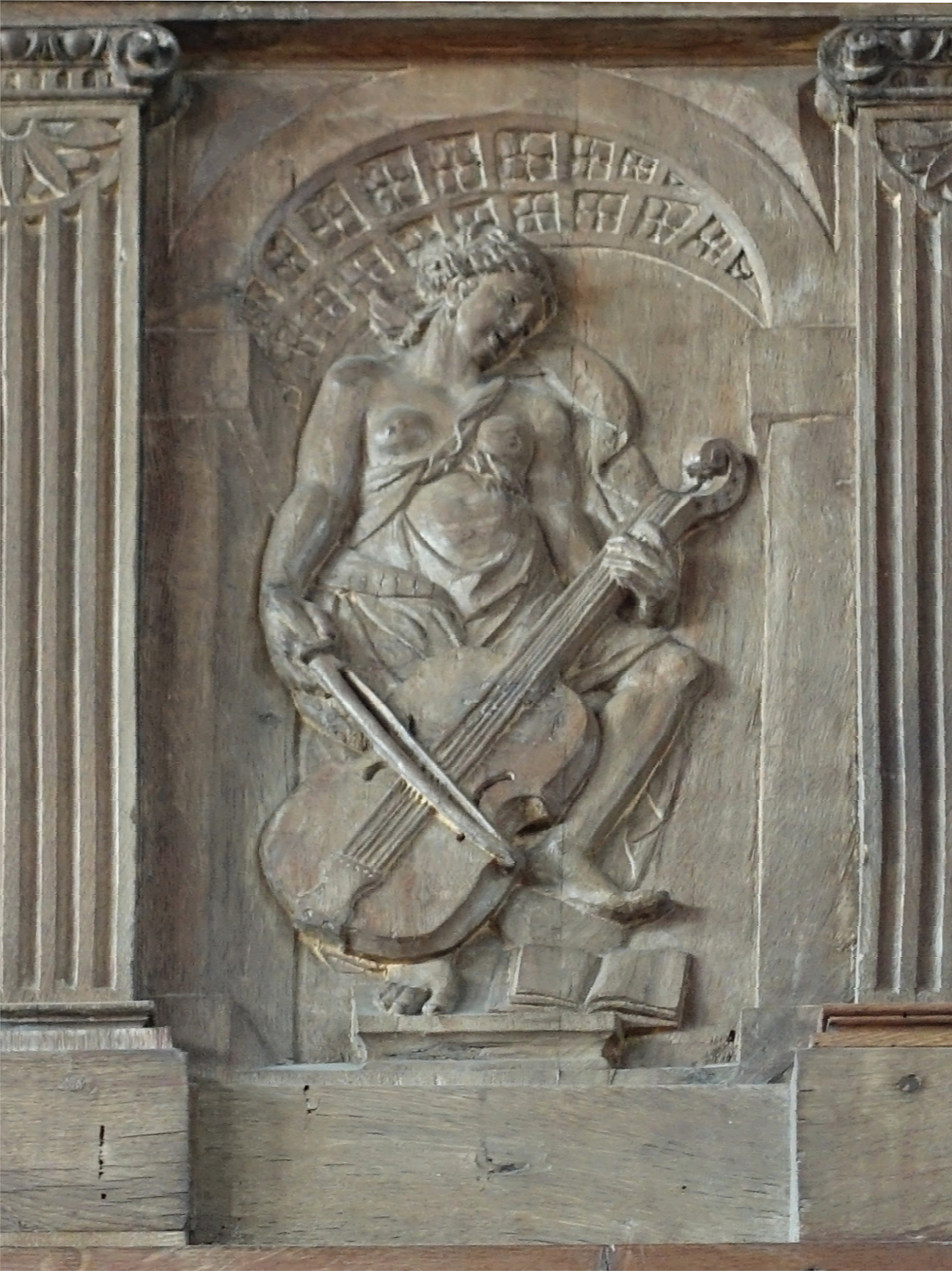
Viol player in Église Sainte-Catherine, Honfleur, France c. 1550–1600

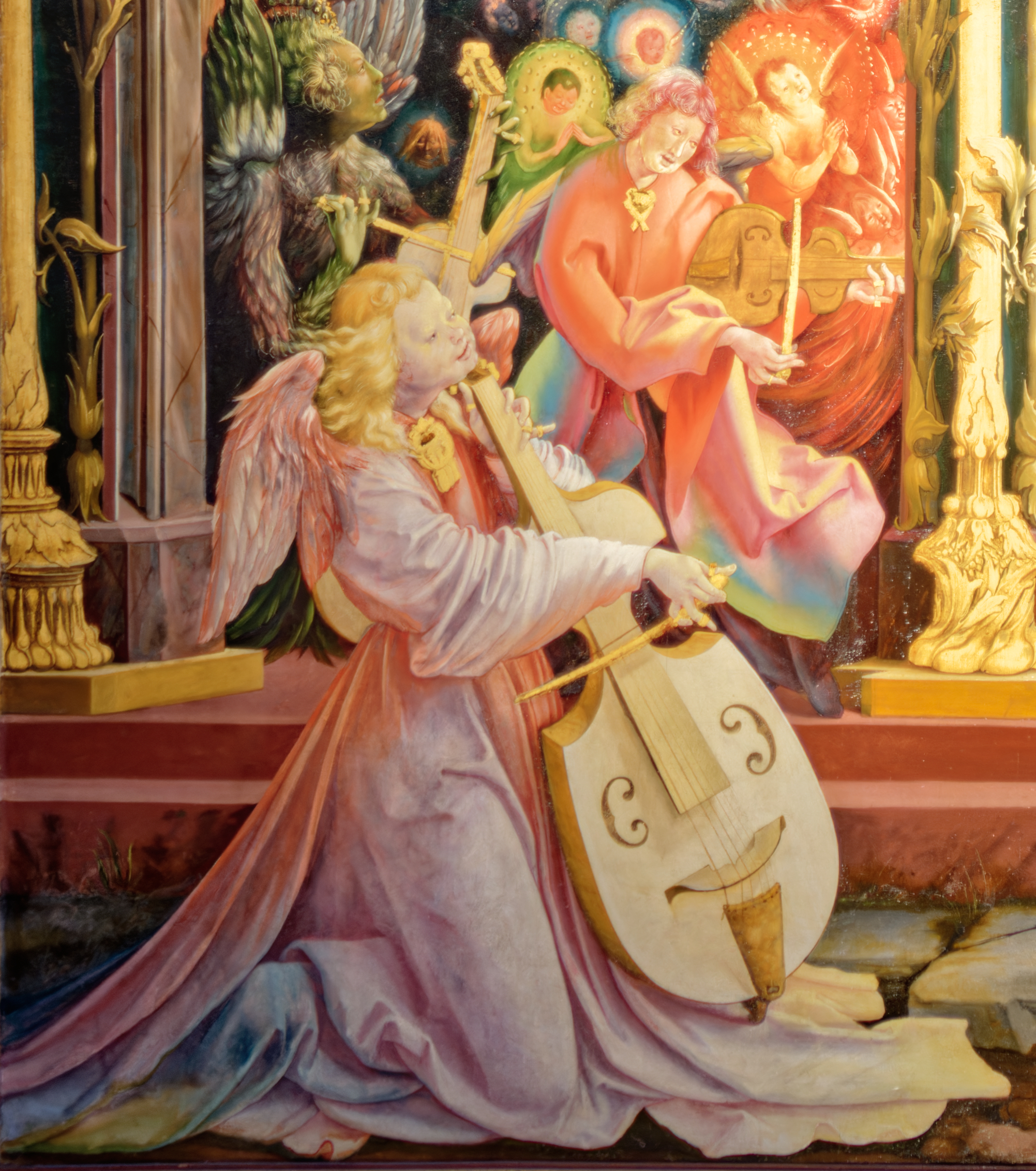
Viola da gambe and viola da braccio (viol of the leg and violin of the arm), by Matthias Grünewald (1480–1528)

== Modern era ==
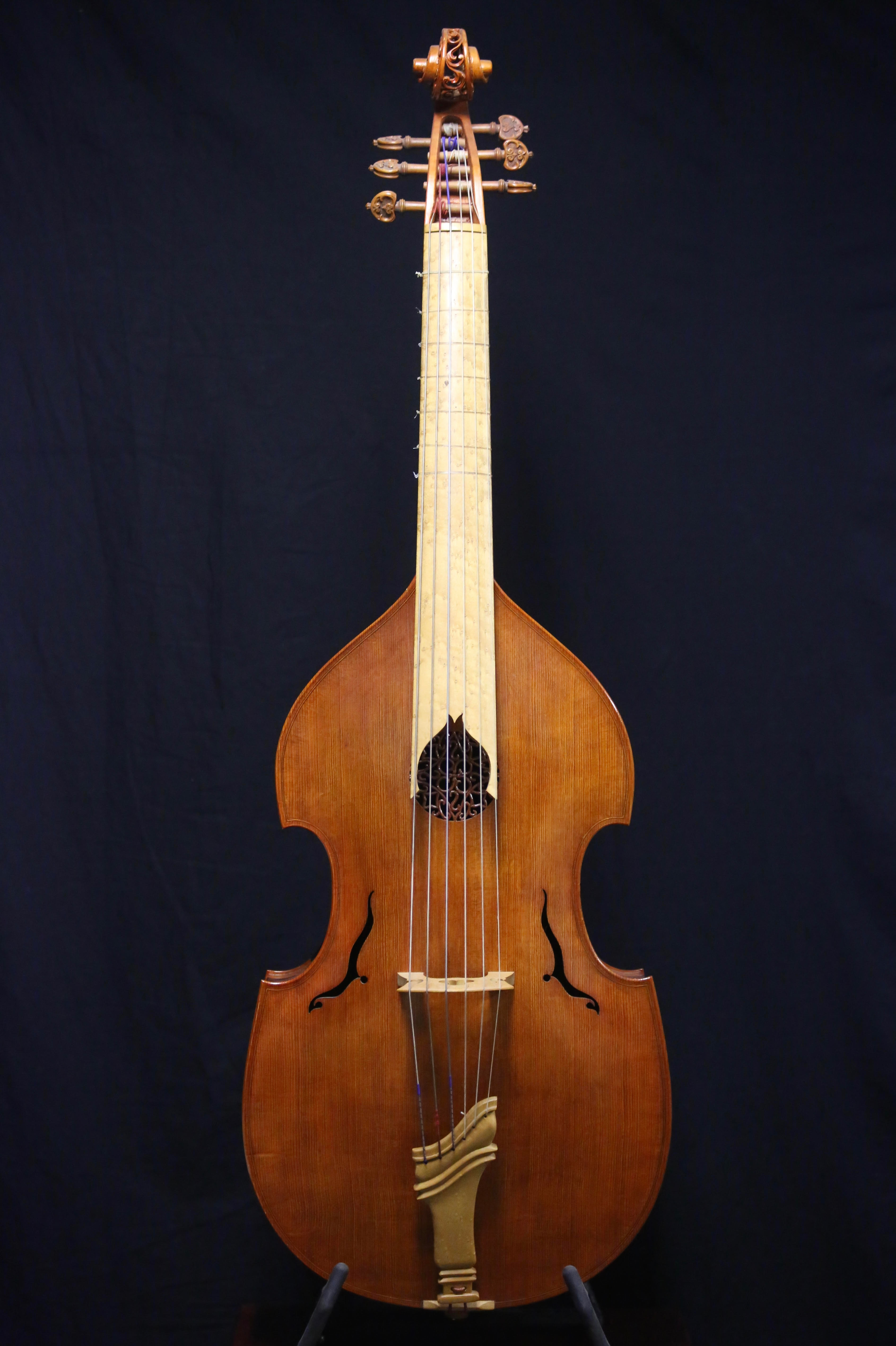
Modern era viola de gamba by violinmakers Hans and Nancy Benning of Benning Violins in 1982 in Los Angeles

Gottfried Finger (ca.1660–1730) – Intrada in A major for 2 violas da gamba from the Codex Sünchinger
Performed by ViolMedium – Eric Miller and Phillip W. Serna, viols

Marin Marais (1656–1728) – Pièces a Une Viole du Premier Livre (1686) – Prelude – Fantaisie – Allemande – Double – Courante – Double – Sarabande – Gigue – Double

Marin Marais (1656–1728) – Sonnerie de Sainte-Geneviève du Mont de Paris The Bells of St. Genevieve from La Gamme et Autres Morceaux de Symphonie (1723)
Performed by New Comma Baroque

Orlando Gibbons (bap.1583-1625) - Fantasia à4, VdGS No.1GB, Oxford. Christ Church, Mss.732-35 (ca.1630)

Orlando Gibbons (bap.1583–1625) – Fantazia à2, VdGS No.3, Cambridge. King's College, Rowe Mss.112-13 (ca.1620)

Orlando Gibbons (bap.1583–1625) – Fantazia à3, VdGS No.3, Oxford. Christ Church, Mus.Ms.21 (ca.1620)

Orlando Gibbons (bap.1583–1625) – Galliard à3, Dublin. Marsh's Library, IRL-Dm Mss.z.3.4.1–3 (ca.1650)

Captaine Tobias Hume (1569–1645) – Tobacco, No.3 The First Part of Ayres – The Musicall Humours (1605)

Captaine Tobias Hume (1569–1645) – The Spirit of Gambo (The Lord Dewys Favoret) from Captaine Hume’s Poeticall Musicke (1607)

John Jenkins (1592–1678) – Pavan à6 in F, VdGS No.2, Oxford. Bodleian Library, Mus.Sch. c.83, II/2 (ca.1667)

William Lawes (1602–1645) – Aire à4, VdGS No.112, Oxford. Bodleian Library, Mus.Sch.b.2, p.33 (ca.1638–45)

Thomas Lupo the Elder (1571–1628) – Fantasia à3 in d, VdGS No.26 from John Merro's Book, Tenbury Manuscripts of St. Michael's College, Oxford. Bodleian Library, Mus.Sch.d.245-47 (ca.1620–30)
Performed by Phillip W. Serna, treble, tenor and bass viols

Étienne Moulinié (1599–1676) – Fantasia à4, VdGS No.2 for 2 Treble Viols, Tenor & Bass Viols (1639)

Diego Ortiz (1510–1570) – Recercada primera sobre tenores italianos from Trattado de Glosas, Libro Secundo (1553)

Robert Parsons (ca.1535–1572) – In Nomine à7, No.2, London. GB-Lbl, Add.Ms.31390 (ca.1578)

Picforth (fl.1580s) – In Nomine à5, London. GB-Lbl, Add.Ms.31390 (ca.1578)

Poynt (fl.1570s) – In Nomine à5, London. GB-Lbl, Add.Ms.31390 (ca.1578)

Henry Purcell (1659–1695) – In Nomine à6, Z.746 for Treble, Tenor & Bass Viols (1680)

Claudia Francesca Rusca (1583–1676) – Canzone Prima à4 'La Borromea' from Sacri Concerti à1–5 con Salmi e Canzoni Francesi (Milan, 1630)
Performed by Phillip W. Serna, treble, tenor and bass viols with lute

Christoph Schaffrath (1709–1763) – Duetto in D minor for 2 violas da gamba
Performed by ViolMedium – Eric Miller and Phillip W. Serna, viols

Thomas Tallis (ca.1505-1585) - Why fum'th in sight à4, the Third Tune from Archbishop Parker's Psalter (1567)

John Taverner (ca.1490–1545) – In Nomine à4 from the Missa Gloria Tibi Trinitas, The Baldwin Partbooks, Oxford. Christ Church, Mss.979-83 (ca.1570)
Performed by Phillip W. Serna, treble, tenor and bass viols

Georg Philipp Telemann (1681–1767) – Concerto for Recorder and Viola da Gamba, TWV 52:a1
Performed by New Comma Baroque

Thomas Tomkins (1572-1656) - A Sad Paven for These Distracted Tymes (1649), Paris. Bibliothèque nationale de France, département Musique, Rés.1122 (ca.1575-1656)

John Ward (1571–1638) – Fantasia à6, VdGS No.1, Oxford. Bodleian Library, Mus.Sch.c.45-50
Performed by Phillip W. Serna, treble, tenor and bass viols

In the 20th and early 21st century, the viol began attracting more interest, particularly among amateur players and early music enthusiasts and societies, and in conservatories and music schools. This may be due to the increased availability of reasonably priced instruments from companies using more automated production techniques, coupled with the greater accessibility of early music editions and historic treatises. The viol is also regarded as a suitable instrument for adult learners; Percy Scholes wrote that the viol repertoire "belongs to an age that demanded musicianship more often than virtuosity". There are now many societies for people with an interest in the viol. The first was the Viola da Gamba Society, which was established in the United Kingdom in 1948 by Nathalie and Cécile Dolmetsch. The Viola da Gamba Society of America followed in 1962. Since then, similar societies have been organized in several other nations. In the 1970s, the now-defunct Guitar and Lute Workshop in Honolulu generated resurgent interest in the viol and traditional luthierie methods within the western United States.

A notable youth viol group is the Gateshead Viol Ensemble. It consists of young players between the ages of 7 and 18 and is quite well known in the northeast of England. It gives young people the opportunity to learn the viol and gives concerts in the North East and abroad. Ensembles like these show that the viol is making a comeback. A living museum of historical musical instruments was created at the University of Vienna as a center for the revival of the instrument. More than 100 instruments, including approximately 50 historical violas da gamba in playable condition, are the property of this new concept of a museum: the Orpheon Foundation Museum of Historical Instruments. All the instruments of this museum are played by the Orpheon Baroque Orchestra, the Orpheon consort, or by musicians who receive an instrument for a permanent loan. The instruments can be seen during temporary exhibitions. They are studied and copied by violin makers, contributing to the extension of the general knowledge we have on the viola da gamba, its forms, and the different techniques used for its manufacture.

The 1991 feature film Tous les matins du monde (All the Mornings of the World) by Alain Corneau, based on the lives of Monsieur de Sainte-Colombe and Marin Marais, prominently featured these composers' music for the viola da gamba and brought viol music to new audiences. The film's bestselling soundtrack features performances by Jordi Savall, one of the best-known modern viola da gamba players. Among the foremost modern players of the viol are Alison Crum, Vittorio Ghielmi, Susanne Heinrich, Wieland Kuijken, Paolo Pandolfo, Andrea de Carlo, Hille Perl and Jonathan Dunford. Many fine modern viol consorts (ensembles) are also recording and performing, among them the groups Fretwork, the Rose Consort of Viols, Les Voix Humaines, and Phantasm. The Baltimore Consort specializes in Renaissance song (mostly English) with broken consort (including viols).

=== New compositions ===
A number of contemporary composers have written for viol, and a number of soloists and ensembles have commissioned new music for viol. Fretwork has been most active in this regard, commissioning George Benjamin, Michael Nyman, Elvis Costello, Sir John Tavener, Orlando Gough, John Woolrich, Tan Dun, Alexander Goehr, Fabrice Fitch, Andrew Keeling, Thea Musgrave, Sally Beamish, Peter Sculthorpe, Gavin Bryars, Barrington Pheloung, Simon Bainbridge, Duncan Druce, Poul Ruders, Ivan Moody, and Barry Guy; many of these compositions may be heard on their 1997 CD Sit Fast. The Yukimi Kambe Viol Consort has commissioned and recorded many works by David Loeb, and the New York Consort of Viols has commissioned Bülent Arel, David Loeb, Daniel Pinkham, Tison Street, Frank Russo, Seymour Barab, William Presser, and Will Ayton, many of these compositions appearing on their 1993 CD Illicita Cosa.

The Viola da Gamba Society of America has also been a potent force fostering new compositions for the viol. Among the music publications of the Society is its New Music for Viols (NMV) a series devoted to newly written pieces. The Society sponsors the International Leo M. Traynor Composition Competition for new music for viols. The competition was first held in 1989 and has taken place every four to five years since. The competition is specifically for consort music for three to six viol that, like the repertoire of the Renaissance, is accessible to accomplished amateurs. The winning pieces are played in concert and also published by the Society. The Society's goal is to stimulate development of a contemporary literature for this remarkable early instrument and thus continue its tradition in modern society.

The Palazzo Strozzi in Florence commissioned composer Bruce Adolphe to create a work based on Bronzino poems, and the piece, "Of Art and Onions: Homage to Bronzino", features a prominent viola da gamba part. Jay Elfenbein has also written works for the Yukimi Kambe Viol Consort, Les Voix Humaines, and Elliot Z. Levine, among others. Other composers for viols include Moondog, Kevin Volans, Roy Whelden, Toyohiko Satoh, Roman Turovsky-Savchuk, Giorgio Pacchioni, Michael Starke, Emily Doolittle, and Jan Goorissen. Composer Henry Vega has written pieces for the Viol: "Ssolo", developed at the Institute of Sonology and performed by Karin Preslmayr, as well as for Netherlands-based ensemble The Roentgen Connection in 2011 with "Slow slower" for recorder, viola da gamba, harpsichord and computer. The Aston Magna Music Festival has recently commissioned works including viol from composers Nico Muhly and Alex Burtzos. The Italian contemporary composer Carlotta Ferrari has written two pieces for viol: "Le ombre segrete" in 2015, and "Profondissimi affetti" in 2016, this latter being based on RPS modal harmony system.

=== Electric instruments ===
Since the early 1980s, numerous instrument makers, including Eric Jensen, Francois Danger, Jan Goorissen, and Jonathan Wilson, have experimented with the design and construction of electric viols. Like other acoustic instruments to which pickups or microphones have been added, electric viols are plugged into an instrument amplifier or a PA system, which makes them sound louder. As well, given that amplifiers and PA systems are electronic components, this gives the performer the ability to change the tone and sound of the instrument by adding effects units such as reverb or changing the tone with a graphic equalizer. An equalizer can be used to shape the sound of an electric viol to suit a performance space, or to create unusual new sounds. Electric viols range from Danger's minimally electrified acoustic/electric Altra line to Eric Jensen's solid-body brace-mounted design. They have met with varying degrees of ergonomic and musical success. In the early 21st century, the Ruby Gamba, a seven-string electric viola da gamba, was developed by Ruby Instrument of Arnhem in the Netherlands. It has 21 tied nylon (adjustable) frets in keeping with the adjustable (tied gut) frets on traditional viols and has an effective playing range of more than six octaves. Electric viols have been adopted by such contemporary gambists as Paolo Pandolfo, Tina Chancey, and Tony Overwater.

== Similar names and common confusions ==
The viola da gamba is occasionally confused with the viola, the alto member of the modern violin family and a standard member of both the symphony orchestra and string quartet. In the 15th century, the Italian word "viola" was a generic term used to refer to any bowed instrument, or fiddle. The word "viola" existed in Italy before the vihuela, or first viol, was brought from Spain. In Italy, "viola" was first applied to a braccio precursor to the modern violin, as described by Tinctoris (De inventione et usu musice, c. 1481–3), and then was later used to describe the first Italian viols as well. Depending on the context, the unmodified viola da braccio most regularly denoted either an instrument from the violin family, or specifically the viola (whose specific name was "alto de viola da braccio"). When Monteverdi called simply for "viole da braccio" in "Orfeo", the composer was requesting violas as well as treble and bass instruments. The full name of the viola, namely "alto de viola da braccio", was finally shortened to "viola" in some languages (e.g. English, Italian, Spanish) once viols became less common, while other languages picked some other part of the phrase to designate the instrument, e.g. "alto" in French and "Bratsche" in German (the latter derived from the Italian "braccio").

Some other instruments have 'viola' in their name, but are not a member of the viola da gamba family. These include the viola d'amore and the viola pomposa. Though the baryton does not have 'viola' in its name, it is sometimes included in the viol family. Whether it is considered a member of this family is a matter of semantics. It is organologically closely related to the viola da gamba proper, but if we think of the family as the group of differently sized instruments that play together in consorts, the baryton would not be among this group. The names 'viola' (Italy) and 'vihuela' (Spain) were essentially synonymous and interchangeable. According to viol historian Ian Woodfield, there is little evidence that the vihuela de arco was introduced to Italy before the 1490s. The term 'viola' was never used exclusively for viols in the 15th or 16th centuries. In 16th century Italy, both violas—the early viols and violins—developed somewhat simultaneously. While violins, such as those of Amati, achieved their classic form before the first half of the century, the viol's form standardized later in the century at the hands of instrument makers in England.

Viola da gamba, viola cum arculo, and vihuela de arco are some (true) alternative names for viols. Both "vihuela" and "viola" were originally used in a fairly generic way, having included even early violins (viola da braccio) under their umbrella. It is common enough (and justifiable) today for modern players of the viola da gamba to call their instruments violas and likewise to call themselves violists. That the "alto violin" eventually became known simply as the "viola" is not without historical context, yet the ambiguity of the name tends to cause some confusion. The violin, or violino, was originally the soprano viola da braccio, or violino da braccio. Due to the popularity of the soprano violin, the entire consort eventually took on the name "violin family". Some other names for viols include viole or violle (French). In Elizabethan English, the word "gambo" (for gamba) appears in many permutations; e.g., "viola de gambo", "gambo violl", "viol de gambo", or "viole de gambo", used by such notables as Tobias Hume, John Dowland, and William Shakespeare in Twelfth Night. Viol da Gamba and Gamba also appear as string family stops on the pipe organ. These stops are sounds created by organ pipes made to imitate the sound of the viol da gamba.

== See also ==
- Arpeggione
- Cello da spalla
- GuitarViol
- Lyra viol
- Viola d'amore
- Category:Viol players
