= Consort of instruments =

16/17th-century English phrase for a musical ensemble

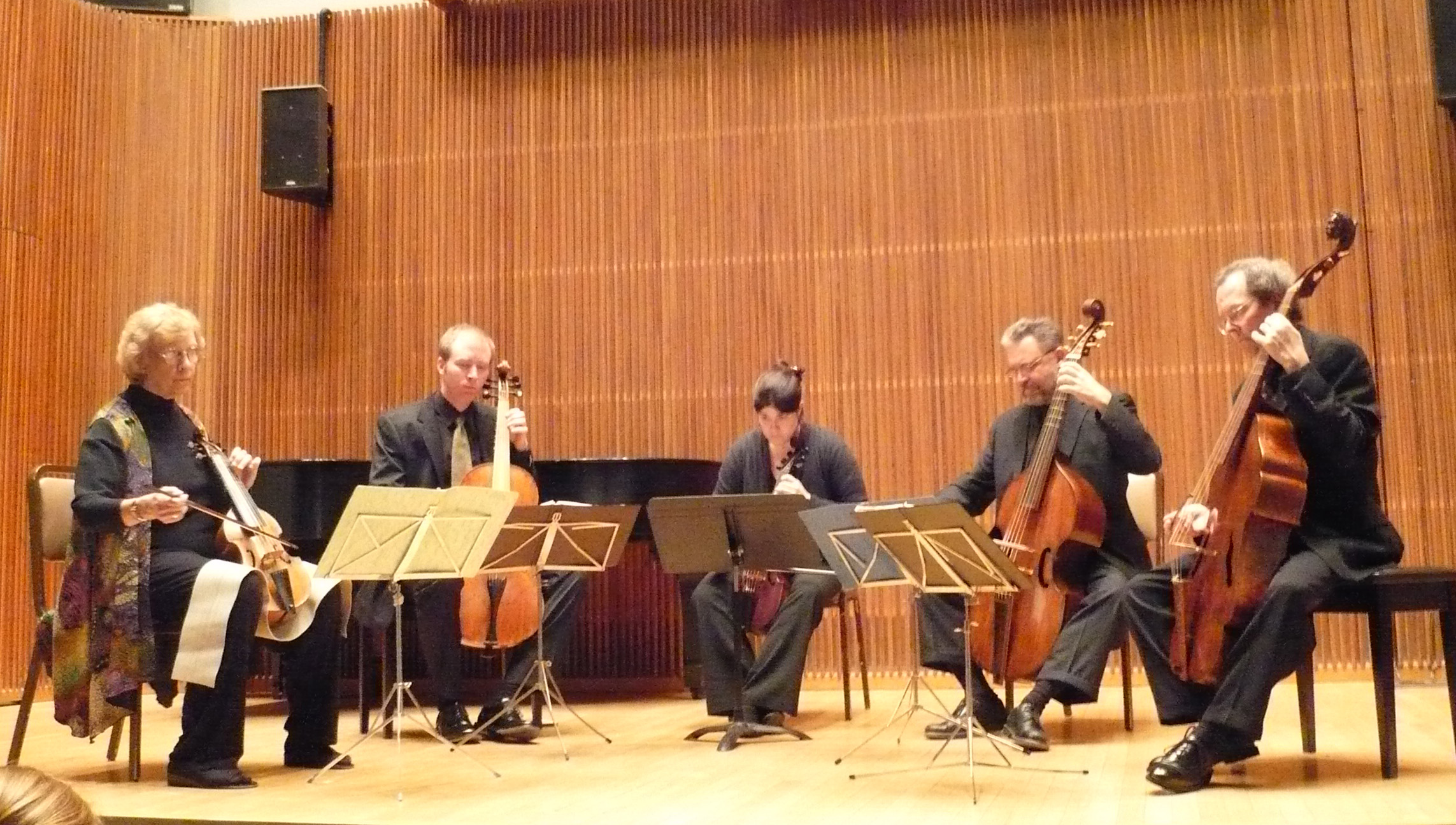
The Smithsonian Consort of Viols

A consort of instruments was a phrase used in England during the 16th and 17th centuries to indicate an instrumental ensemble. These could consist of the same or a variety of instruments. Consort music enjoyed considerable popularity at court and in the households of the wealthy in the Elizabethan era, and many pieces were written for consorts by the major composers of the period. In the Baroque era, consort music was absorbed into chamber music.

== Definitions and forms ==
The earliest documented example of the English word 'consort' in a musical sense is in George Gascoigne’s The Princelye Pleasures (1576). Only from the mid-17th century has there been a clear distinction made between a ‘whole’, or ‘closed’ consort, that is, all instruments of the same family (for example, a set of viols played together) and a ‘mixed’, or ‘broken’ consort, consisting of instruments from various families (for example viols and lute).

Major forms of music composed for consorts included fantasias, cantus firmus settings (including In nomines), variations, dances or ayres, and fantasia suites.

== Major composers ==
Composers of consort music during the Elizabethan era include John Dowland, Anthony Holborne, Osbert Parsley, and William Byrd. The principal Jacobean era composers included Thomas Lupo, Orlando Gibbons, John Coprario, and Alfonso Ferrabosco. William Lawes was a principal composer during the Caroline era. Later 17th-century composers included John Jenkins, Christopher Simpson, Matthew Locke and Henry Purcell.

== Modern consorts ==
In modern times, a number of ensembles have adopted the term "consort" in their names:

- Armonico Consort
- The Baltimore Consort
- B-Five Recorder Consort
- Catacoustic Consort
- The Consort of Musicke
- Dunedin Consort
- Early Music Consort of London
- Gaia Consort
- The Harp Consort
- The King's Consort
- Leonhardt-Consort
- Locke Brass Consort
- The Newberry Consort
- Orlando Consort
- The Paul Winter Consort
- Quadriga Consort
- Clemencic Consort
- Ricercar Consort
- Rose Consort of Viols
- Sherwood Consort
- Southern Consort of Voices
- Taverner Consort
- The Tudor Consort

== See also ==
- Chest of viols
