= Ficta (early music consort) =

- Origin: Oxford, England
- Genres: Early music, Medieval music, Renaissance music,
- Years active: 2009-present
- Members: Grace Newcombe, director

Ficta is an Oxford-based English vocal consort specialising in Medieval and Renaissance music, both secular and religious. It is a quintet founded by Grace Newcombe in 2009 in Oxford. Ficta has performed in concerts and recitals across Oxford, most recently collaborating with the Oxford University String Ensemble in a performance of Haydn's Salve Regina.
