= B-Five Recorder Consort =

European recorder quintet

- Origin: Europe
- Years active: 2003–present
- Labels: Coviello Classics
- Members: Markus Bartholomé, Katelijne Lanneau, Thomas List, Silja-Maaria Schütt, Mina Voet
- Website: www.b-five.eu

B-Five Recorder Consort is a European recorder quintet. The centerpiece of the ensemble's programs forms the consort music of the renaissance period. In addition to that the musicians try to establish a new repertoire for recorder quintet in collaboration with different composers.

== History ==
Founded 2003 in Barcelona. The ensemble appeared at the MAfestival (Bruges), the Klara Festival (Brussels), the Festival de Música Antigua (Barcelona), with NDR (North German Broadcasting Corporation, Hamburg), at the Franconian Summer (Nuremberg), and the Festival of Early Music in St. Ruprecht (Vienna).

Collaboration with composers:

- Günter Kochan (Quintettino, 2004)
- Hans Stadlmair (Triptychon, 2004)
- Hans-Jürg Meier (Volta Bianca, 2007)
- Carl Rütti (Dowland-Suite, 2012)
- Fabrizio De Rossi Re (O quam tu pulchra es, 2014)
- Anna Trauffer (Byrd's birds, 2018)

== Discography ==
- The Fruit of Love - Elizabethan Consort Music (2006; Cavalli Records)
- Geld Macht Musik - Music for the Fugger Family (2011; Coviello Classics)
- In search of Dowland - Consort Music of John Dowland and Carl Rütti (2014; Coviello Classis)
- William Byrd: Consort Music and Songs - with Sunhae Im, soprano and Susanna Borsch, recorder (2017, Coviello Classics)
- "The Soule of Heaven", Pavans and Almaines by Alfonso Ferrabosco I&II – with Sofie Vanden Eynde, lute (2021; Coviello Classics)
