= Aeronautics at the 1936 Summer Olympics =

Aeronautics at the Games of the XI Olympiad
- Date: 1936

Medalists
1st place, gold medalist(s)		Hermann Schreiber	Switzerland

Aeronautics at the Summer Olympics
- IOC Code: AER
- Governing body: FAI
- Events: 1 (mixed)

Summer Olympics
- 1896; 1900; 1904; 1908; 1912; 1920; 1924; 1928; 1932; 1936; 1948; 1952; 1956; 1960; 1964; 1968; 1972; 1976; 1980; 1984; 1988; 1992; 1996; 2000; 2004; 2008; 2012; 2016; 2020; 2024; 2028; 2032
- Medalists

An Olympic gold medal for aeronautics was awarded in conjunction with the 1936 Summer Olympics for the greatest aeronautic achievement in the preceding four years.

The winner was Swiss pilot Hermann Schreiber, who won for becoming the first person to fly over the Alps in a glider. Most sources report his flight taking place in 1935, though Thomas Lippert of the Journal of Sports Philately stated it was on August 4, 1933. Schreiber received his medal at the 1936 Summer Olympics closing ceremony.

A prize for aeronautics had been considered by the International Olympic Committee as early as the 1920s, though it remained unused until 1936. The aeronautics prize was not awarded again and was officially discontinued in 1946, along with the prize for alpinism.
