= Olympische Hymne =

Choral work by Richard Strauss

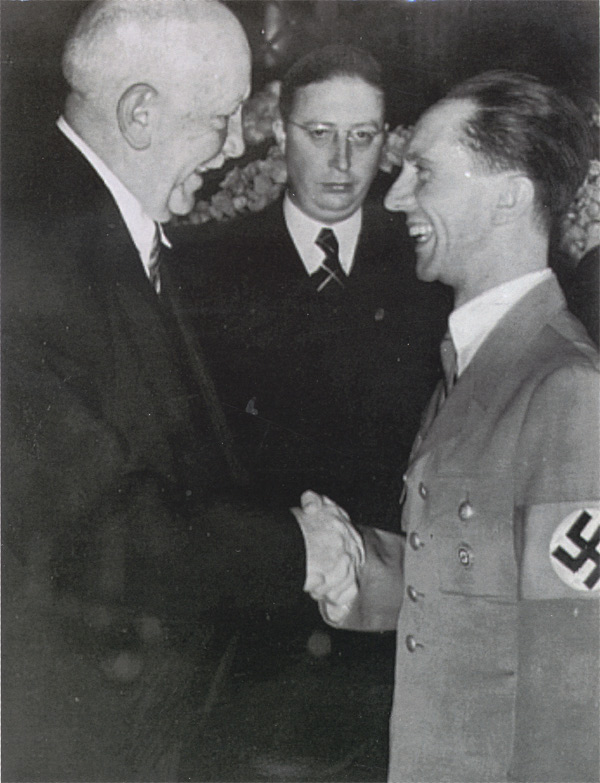
Composer Richard Strauss meeting propaganda minister Joseph Goebbels c.1934/5

Olympische Hymne (Olympic Hymn) is a composition for orchestra and mixed chorus by Richard Strauss.

In 1932, Richard Strauss was approached by Dr. Theodor Lewald, the German Olympic Committee's representative to the International Olympic Committee (IOC). The German committee desired an anthem composed for the 1936 Summer Olympics to be held in Berlin. Early in 1933, Strauss agreed to compose an Olympic Hymn, with the condition that a suitable text be found to set to music. However, in 1933, the IOC had chosen Walter Bradley-Keeler's Hymne Olympique, written for the 1932 Los Angeles Olympics, as the official Olympic anthem for all time. The IOC however accepted Lewald's proposal to allow Germany its own Olympic anthem for the Berlin games.

== Lyrics ==
Gerhart Hauptmann initially agreed to write the required text, but he never produced it. Therefore, the text was determined by competition. Wilhelm von Scholz, president of the German Poets' Academy, won first place but his composition (a Germanic ode devoted to Siegfried's battles) was considered far too nationalistic. A second competition resulted in 3,000 texts submitted. Most were unsuitable, but from fifty possibilities, four were sent to the composer. Strauss chose Robert Lubahn's and said he was "extraordinarily satisfied" with it. Lubahn (1903–1974), an unemployed Berlin actor at the time, received 1,000 Reichsmark on September 22, 1934 for his poem. It consists of three stanzas, each of which ends with the word "Olympia".

German original

Völker! Seid des Volkes Gäste, kommt durch's offne Tor herein!
Friede sei dem Völkerfeste! Ehre soll der Kampfspruch sein.
Junge Kraft will Mut beweisen, heißes Spiel Olympia!
deinen Glanz in Taten preisen, reines Ziel: Olympia.

Vieler Länder Stolz und Blüte kam zum Kampfesfest herbei;
alles Feuer das da glühte, schlägt zusammen hoch und frei.
Kraft und Geist naht sich mit Zagen. Opfergang Olympia!
Wer darf deinen Lorbeer tragen, Ruhmesklang: Olympia?

Wie nun alle Herzen schlagen in erhobenem Verein,
soll in Taten und in Sagen Eidestreu das Höchste sein.
Freudvoll sollen Meister siegen, Siegesfest Olympia!
Freude sei noch im Erliegen, Friedensfest: Olympia.
Freudvoll sollen Meister siegen, Siegesfest Olympia!
Olympia! Olympia! Olympia!

English translation

Peoples! Be our people's guests, come in through the open gate!
Peace to the festivities! Let honor be the motto of the contest.
Youth wants to show hot courage, Olympic games!
Praising your glory in deeds, a pure goal: the Olympics.

Pride and prosperity of many countries came forward to fight hard;
All the fire which burns there, pulses together, high and free.
Strength and spirit approaches with trepidation. Sacrifice Olympia!
Who can wear your laurels, fame's sound, Olympia?

Now as hearts beating with lofty union,
Vigor should be the highest in deeds and in legends.
Joyfully will champions win, in Olympic victory celebration!
Joy is still ours in a realm of peace: the Olympics.
Joyful even in defeat, Olympic victory celebration!
Olympia! Olympia! Olympia!

The version above is the one sung at the opening ceremonies and differs in one word from Lubahn's original submission. Lubahn's word Rechtsgewalt (force of law) in the last of the three stanzas was replaced (over Lubahn's objection) with the word Eidestreu (bound by oath) by Reich Minister for Public Enlightenment and Propaganda Joseph Goebbels who found Lubahn's usage ambiguous and possibly democratic.

Composition of Olympische Hymne was completed by Strauss on December 22, 1934. The principal music theme was derived from a major symphony Strauss planned but never finished. Strauss wrote disparagingly of the work to his librettist Stefan Zweig: "I am whiling away the boredom of the advent season by composing an Olympic Hymn for the plebs—I of all people, who hate and despise sports. Well, idleness is the root of all evil." The composer originally demanded 10,000 Reichsmark for the commission, but agreed to waive the fee altogether following negotiations with Lewald.

During the 1936 Winter Olympics in Garmisch-Partenkirchen, the composer invited members of the IOC executive board to hear the work sung by an opera star from Munich. In February 1936, the IOC declared Strauss's composition as the Olympic anthem "for all time" much as it had in 1933 for Bradley-Keeler's composition.

== Premiere ==
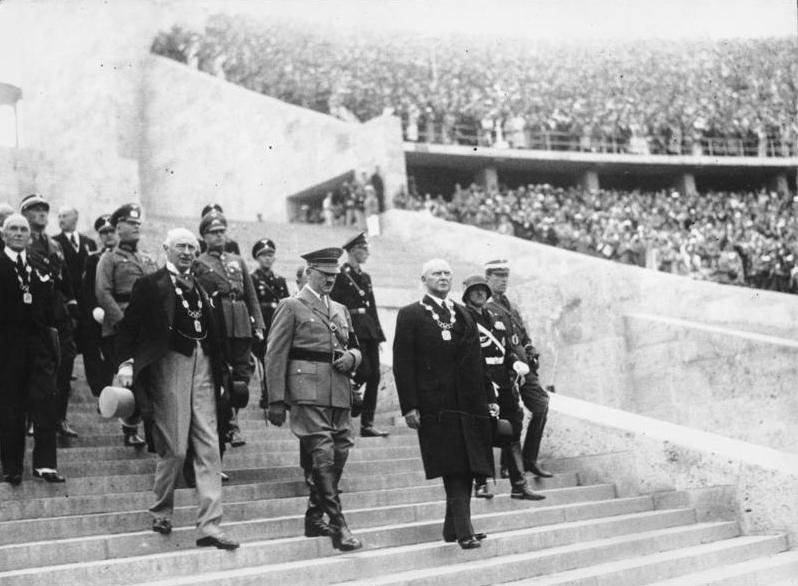
Opening ceremony of the 1936 Summer Olympics: Adolf Hitler, Henri de Baillet-Latour and Theodor Lewald enter the Olympic Stadium, Berlin

The premiere was held on August 1, 1936, at the opening ceremonies of the 1936 Summer Olympics at the Olympic Stadium (Berlin), with the Berlin Philharmonic augmented by the National Socialist Symphony Orchestra and a chorus of one thousand members attired in white. From the distinguished visitor section on the opposite side of the stadium to the musicians, Theodor Lewald stepped onto a rostrum to address the nearly 4,000 athletes from 49 nations who had just marched in. His remarks concluded with the news that the Olympic Committee had decided the day before to make Richard Strauss's Olympic Hymn the hymn for all future meets. He expressed his thanks to the composer. After a short opening proclamation by Adolf Hitler, and an artillery salute and the release of several thousand white pigeons, Richard Strauss conducted the Olympische Hymne at 5:16 p.m.

The duration of the work is approximately three and one-half minutes. A piano-vocal score was published by Fürstner in Berlin in 1936. Strauss's hand-written full orchestra score was dedicated to Theodor Lewald "in memory of 1 August 1936". This score was located after the war by the German National Olympic Committee, and copies were made for the organizers of the 1968 Summer Olympics in Mexico City and for IOC President Juan Samaranch in 1997 for the Olympic Museum in Lausanne. A full score was published in 1999 by C. F. Peters as part of the Richard Strauss Edition.

== Soundtrack ==
A slightly abbreviated version of the Olympische Hymne can be heard on the soundtrack to the closing sequence of part 1 of Leni Riefenstahl's film Olympia, the film of the 1936 Olympics. (It follows the Marathon sequence.)

== Discography ==
| Conductor | Orchestra | Recorded |
|---|---|---|
| Bruno Seidler-Winkler | Berlin State Opera Orchestra and Chorus | 1936 |
| James Stobart | Locke Brass Consort | 1979 |
| Hayko Siemens | Munich Symphony Orchestra & Munich Motet Choir | 1999 |
| Leon Botstein | American Symphony Orchestra & Concert Chorale of New York | 2005 |
