= Gliding at the 1936 Summer Olympics =

Cover of one of 26 booklets produced for the 1936 Olympics describing each sport. It illustrates a glider being bungee launched

Gliding at the 1936 Summer Olympics was a demonstration sport. The sport of gliding had been developed in Germany in the 1920s but had spread widely by 1936, allowing an international demonstration to the International Olympic Committee (IOC).

No contest took place and no prizes were allowed by the IOC. ISTUS (Internationale Studienkommission für motorlosen Flug) which later became part of the FAI Gliding Commission had wanted to present prizes, but this did not happen. However, a Swiss, Hermann Schreiber, was awarded a gold medal for his flight across the Alps in 1935.

The demonstration at the 1936 Berlin Olympics was at Berlin-Staaken airfield on 4 August. Twenty-one pilots from seven countries (Bulgaria, Italy, Hungary, Yugoslavia, Switzerland, Germany and Austria) took part, including Germany's Hanna Reitsch. On the previous day, a wing of a glider broke during an aerobatic flight by an Austrian, Ignaz Stiefsohn. He was killed.

The Hungarian pilot, Lajos Rotter, declared on the evening of 10 August at Rangsdorf that the next day he would fly to Kiel, where Olympic sailing events were held. He then flew his Nemere glider to Kiel in poor weather. On arrival over Kiel at an altitude of 650 m he saluted the Olympic site with two loops and landed at Holtenau 4hr 31min after launch. The distance flown was 336.5 km. This was then the longest pre-declared goal flight by a glider.

Gliding was officially accepted by the International Olympic Committee (IOC) at their 1938 Cairo Conference as part of the "facultative" (optional) group of sports, and was to be staged for the first time in the 1940 Summer Olympics. An Olympic glider, the DFS Olympia Meise, was chosen in 1939 but the Games were cancelled due to the outbreak of the Finnish/Russian winter war. The sport remained on the list of optional sports through 1956, when the IOC decided to abolish that list. None of the organizers through 1956 had elected to host gliding events. The Fédération Aéronautique Internationale, which was formed following the 1905 Olympic Congress, is presently recognized by the IOC, but none of its disciplines (which include gliding) appear to be close to Olympic inclusion. Activist Angus Lippiatt has been consistently campaigning to have gliding reintroduced in future Olympics, however progress and developments have been questioned.

== See also ==
- Gliding
- Gliding competitions
