= Sunhae Im =

South Korean soprano (born 1976)

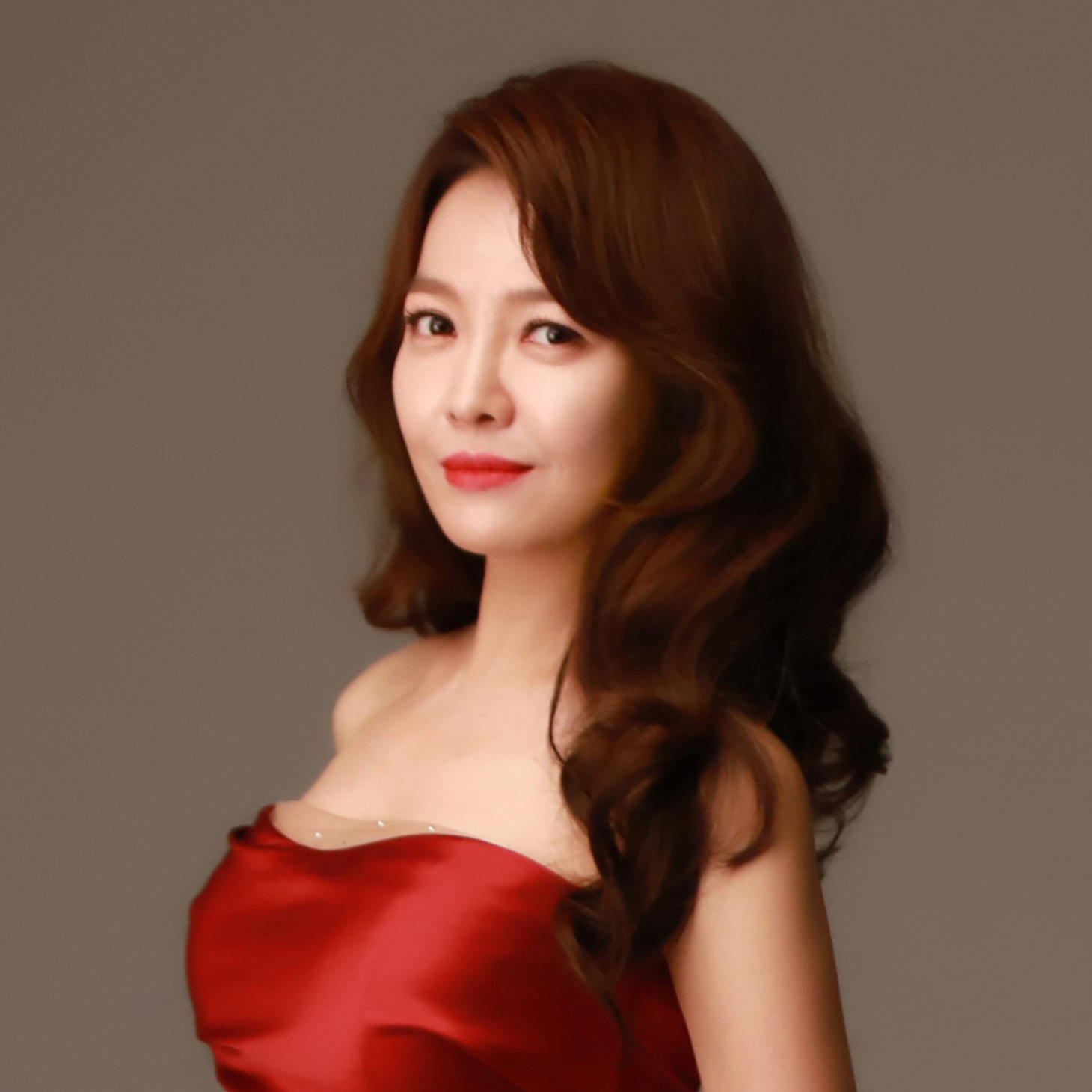

Background information
- Born: January 15, 1976 (age 50); Cheorwon, South Korea
- Genres: Classical music, Opera, Early music
- Occupation: Soprano
- Years active: 1999–present
- Website: www.sunhaeim.com

Korean name
- Hangul: 임선혜
- Hanja: 任善惠
- RR: Im Seonhye
- MR: Im Sŏnhye

Sunhae Im (Korean: 임선혜; Hanja: 任善惠; born in 1976) is a South Korean soprano. She has been described as a bright and versatile lyric soprano with lightness and coloratura. She first gained her reputation in the field of early music and now performs a wide range of classical and non-classical music.

== Career ==
Sunhae Im was born in Cheorwon, South Korea. She studied vocal music with Lokyung Pak at Seoul National University in South Korea and with Roland Hermann at the Hochschule für Musik Karlsruhe in Germany. In 1997 she was awarded the Grand Prix in the Korea Schubert Society–Munhwa Ilbo Competition (Seoul), the Grand Prix in the Korean Voice Competition (Seoul), the Second Prize in the Dong-A Music Competition (Seoul), and the Second Prize and the Audience Prize in the International Schubert Competition (Osaka, Tokyo). In 2000, she was a finalist in the Queen Elisabeth Competition (Brussels).

She made her European debut with the conductor Philippe Herreweghe in Antwerp, Belgium in December 1999, by singing Mozart's "Et Incarnatus Est" from Great Mass in C Minor as well as his solo motet Exsultate Jubilate. Her operatic debut was made in early 2000 as Barbarina in The Marriage of Figaro by Mozart at the Frankfurt Opera, where she also performed as Amore and Valetto in The Coronation of Poppea by Monteverdi. She was a member of Staatsoper Hannover and performed as Zerlina (in Don Giovanni), Papagena (The Magic Flute), Blonde (The Abduction from the Seraglio), Adele (Die Fledermaus), and Yniold (Pelleas et Mélisande) between 2001 and 2004, before freelancing.

Sunhae Im is known especially for historically-informed performance of operas and oratorios from the Baroque and Classical eras. She is asked most frequently to perform works by Bach, Handel, Haydn, and Mozart. Her compilation album Portrait (2017) consists of pieces by those four composers. Many examples of her work in early music are found from the collaboration with René Jacobs, a master conductor of early music. She joined Jacobs in recording both passions by Bach, five operas by Mozart, two operas by Handel, and one opera by Haydn, as well as performing in numerous live concerts and operas. Jacobs wrote in his autobiography, "some of them, such as Stéphane Degout and Sunhae Im, were among the best actor-singers I know." She also interpreted lesser known works by composers including Terradellas, Soler, Gassmann, and Conti.

In addition to Baroque and Classical music, her repertoire includes Renaissance (such as works by Byrd), Bel canto (Rossini and Donizetti), Romantic (Mendelssohn, Schumann, Fauré, and Mahler), and modern classical music (Poulenc and Schulhoff). For example with the conductor Manfred Honeck, she performed Mahler's Symphony No. 2 and No. 4, Poulenc's Dialogues of the Carmelites (as Sister Constance), Bach's St John Passion, Mozart's The Marriage of Figaro (as Susanna), Idomeneo (as Illia), and Requiem (at Carnegie Hall, Musikverein, and Berliner Philharmonie). She also performs nonclassical music occasionally. She appeared as Christine Daaé of Maury Yeston's musical Phantom in its 2015 South Korean premiere and 2019 & 2021 revival.

She has worked with conductors including René Jacobs, Manfred Honeck, Fabio Biondi, William Christie, Philippe Herreweghe, Sigiswald Kuijken, Andreas Spering, Iván Fischer, Zubin Mehta, Myung-whun Chung, Ton Koopman, Giovanni Antonini, Herbert Blomstedt, Kent Nagano, and Riccardo Chailly. She has worked with groups including the Akademie für Alte Musik Berlin, Freiburg Baroque Orchestra, the Pittsburgh Symphony Orchestra, and the New York Philharmonic.

In 2009, Sunhae Im was the soprano soloist for the Pentecost solemn mass celebrated by Pope Benedict XVI at St. Peter's Basilica in Vatican City, where she performed Haydn's Harmoniemesse with Helmut Müller-Brühl. In 2014, she sang the national anthem of South Korea for the closing ceremony of the 2014 Asian Games. She performed in various national and social events such as the concert for 2017 South Korea-China Summit in Beijing, 2019 Human Rights Day Ceremony in Seoul, and 2020 Korea Memorial Day Ceremony in Daejeon. She recorded a sound track "Will Be Back" for the Seoul Broadcasting System drama Moon Lovers: Scarlet Heart Ryeo in 2016. She performed in five episodes of the TV program The Master broadcast by Mnet TV in South Korea in 2017. She also assumed the role of broadcasting host (rather than singer) for TV and radio programs, notably for "Sunhae Im's Ombra Mai Fu" by Hankyung Arte TV. She often volunteers to sing at benefit concerts, including the Hopeshare Concert series that she has been organizing since 2009.

== Selected recordings & music awards ==
=== CD / Audio ===
- Sunhae Im: The Man I Love - Musical Album (solo album). Works by Bernstein, Gershwin, Levay, Yeston, Loewe, and Webber. Universal, 2022.
- Didone abbandonata, Cantatas & Arias (solo album). Works by Jommelli, Ristori, Vinci, Venier, Hasse, Porpora, Faggioli, Sarro. CPO, 2019.
- Sunhae Im: Portrait (solo compilation album). Works by Handel, Bach, Haydn, Mozart. Universal, 2017.
- Orfeo[s] (solo album). Works by Scarlatti, Pergolesi, Clérambault, Rameau. Akademie für Alte Musik Berlin, led by Bernhard Forck. Harmonia Mundi, 2015. [Elly Ameling Prize, Orphée d'Or 2015, Académie du Disque Lyrique]
- Telemann: Sieg der Schoenheit (The Triumph of Beauty). Sunhae Im as Placidia, Akademie für Alte Musik Berlin, Michael Hofstetter (music director). CPO, 2026.
- Liszt: Legends of the Saints Vol. 2. Sunhae Im as soprano soloist, Orchester Wiener Akademie, Martin Haselböck (conductor). Resound, 2023.
- Liszt: Orchestral Songs. Sunhae Im as soprano soloist, Orchester Wiener Akademie, Martin Haselböck (conductor). Aparté, 2023.
- Jeajoon Ryu: Symphony No. 2. Sunhae Im as soprano soloist, Seoul International Music Festival Orchestra, National Chorus of Korea, Suwon City Choir, Ralf Gothóni (conductor). Dux, 2023.
- Haydn: L’isola disabitata (Deserted Island). Sunhae Im as Silvia, Akademie für Alte Musik Berlin, Bernhard Forck (music director). Pentatone, 2021. [2021/4 Quarterly Critic's Choice of the German Record Critics' Award (Preis der deutschen Schallplattenkritik)]
- Inmo Yang: The Genetics of Strings. Sunhae Im as soprano soloist, Violin by Inmo Yang. Deutsche Gramophone / Universal Korea, 2021.
- Spring in My Hometown - Korean Songs for Children. Sunhae Im as soprano soloist, Korean Symphony Orchestra, conducted by Chi-Yong Chung. Universal, 2021.
- Erwin Schulhoff: Sämtliche Lieder (Complete Lieder). Sunhae Im as soprano soloist, Klaus Simon (piano). bastille musique, 2020. [2021/1 Quarterly Critic's Choice of the German Record Critics' Award (Preis der deutschen Schallplattenkritik)] [Les Clef de mois, Feb 2021, ResMusica]
- Graupner: Antiochus & Stratonica. Sunhae Im as Mirtenia, Boston Early Music Festival Orchestra, Paul O’Dette & Stephen Stubbs (music directors), Robert Mealy (concertmaster). CPO, 2020.
- Nation of People, for the 100th Anniversary of March 1 Movement. Sunhae Im as soprano soloist, Korean National Choir, Seoul Philharmonic Orchestra. Flexus, 2019.
- Byrd: Consort Music and Songs. Sunhae Im as soprano soloist, B-Five Recorder Consort. Coviello Classics, 2017.
- Handel: Lucio Cornelio Silla. Sunhae Im as Metella, Europa Galante, conducted by Fabio Biondi. Glossa, 2017.
- Bach: St. John Passion. Sunhae Im as soprano soloist, RIAS Kammerchor, Staats und Domchor Berlin, Akademie für Alte Musik Berlin, conducted by René Jacobs. Harmonia Mundi, 2016.
- Moon Lovers - Scarlet Heart Ryeo, Original Sound Track. Sunhae Im as soprano soloist. CJENM Music, 2016.
- Bach: Christmas Oratorio. Sunhae Im as soprano soloist, La Petite Bande, conducted by Sigiswald Kuijken. Challenge Classics, 2014.
- Handel: Orlando. Sunhae Im as Dorinda, Baroque Orchestra B’Rock, conducted by René Jacobs. Archive, 2014.
- Hyokun Kim: Guide Us, We Surrender Ourselves to You. Sunhae Im as soprano soloist. Association Cécile, 2014.
- Bach: St. Matthew Passion. Sunhae Im as soprano soloist, RIAS Kammerchor, Staats und Domchor Berlin, Akademie für Alte Musik Berlin, conducted by René Jacobs. Harmonia Mundi, 2013.
- Mozart: La Finta Giardiniera. Sunhae Im as Serpetta, Freiburg Baroque Orchestra, conducted by René Jacobs. Harmonia Mundi, 2012.
- Handel: Agrippina. Sunhae Im as Poppea, Akademie für Alte Musik Berlin, conducted by René Jacobs. Harmonia Mundi, 2011. [BBC Music Magazine Award 2012] [Nominated for Grammy as Best Opera Recording, 2012]
- Fauré: Requiem. Sunhae Im as soprano soloist, Chor des Bayerischen Rundfunks, Münchener Kammerorchester, conducted by Peter Dijkstra. Sony, 2011. [Choral Recording of the Year, 2012 Echo Klassik Awards]
- Terradellas: Sesostri. Sunhae Im as Sesostri, Real Compañía Ópera de Cámara, conducted by Juan Bautista Otero. RCOC, 2011. [Orphée d’Or palmarés 2011]
- Mahler: Symphony No. 4. Sunhae Im as soprano soloist, Pittsburgh Symphony Orchestra, conducted by Manfred Honeck. Exton, 2010. [International Classical Music Award (ICMA) 2012]
- Mozart: The Magic Flute. Sunhae Im as Papagena, Akademie für Alte Musik Berlin, conducted by René Jacobs. Harmonia Mundi, 2010. [BBC Music Magazine Award 2011]
- Soler: Il Sogno & La Dora Festiggiante. Sunhae Im as soprano soloist, Real Compañía Ópera de Cámara, conducted by Juan Bautista Otero. RCOC, 2010. [Orphée d’Or palmarés 2010]
- Haydn: Harmonienmesse (Hommage zum 200. Todestag von Joseph Haydn). Sunhae Im as soprano soloist, Kölner Domchor, Kölner Kammerorchester, conducted by Helmut Müller-Brühl. Naxos, 2009.
- Mozart: Idomeneo. Sunhae Im as Ilia, Freiburg Baroque Orchestra, conducted by René Jacobs. Harmonia Mundi, 2009. [2009 Annual Award by the German Record Critics' Award (Preis der deutschen Schallplattenkritik)]
- Terradellas: Artaserse. Sunhae Im as Semira, Real Compañía Ópera de Cámara, conducted by Juan Bautista Otero. RCOC, 2009. [Orphée d’Or palmarés 2009]
- Mozart: Demofoonte - Fragments of an Opera. Sunhae Im as soprano soloist, Cappella Coloniensis, conducted by Bruno Weil. Arts Productions, 2008.
- Mozart: Don Giovanni. Sunhae Im as Zerlina, Freiburg Baroque Orchestra, conducted by René Jacobs. Harmonia Mundi, 2007.
- Mozart: La Clemenza di Tito. Sunhae Im as Servilia, Freiburg Baroque Orchestra, conducted by René Jacobs. Harmonia Mundi, 2006. [Nominated for Grammy as Best Opera Recording & Best Classical Album, 2006]
- Bach: Mass in B minor. Sunhae Im as soprano soloist, Dresden Chamber Choir, Cologne Chamber Orchestra, conducted by Helmut Müller-Brühl. Naxos, 2005.
- Mendelssohn: Paulus. Sunhae Im as soprano soloist, Chor St. Michaelis Hamburg, Johann Christian Bach-Akademie, conducted by Christoph Schoener. Mitra, 2005.
- Haydn: The Creation. Sunhae Im as soprano soloist, VokalEnsemble Köln, Capella Augustina, conducted by Andreas Spering. Naxos, 2005.
- Handel: Siroe, Re di Persia. Sunhae Im as Laodice, Cappella Coloniensis, conducted by Andreas Spering. Harmonia Mundi, 2004.
- Haydn: Cantatas for the Esterházys. Sunhae Im as soprano soloist, VokalEnsemble Köln, Cappella Coloniensis, conducted by Andreas Spering. Harmonia Mundi, 2002.

=== DVD / Blu-ray ===
- Haydn: Harmonienmesse (Pentecost mass celebrated by Pope Benedict XVI). Sunhae Im as soprano soloist, Kölner Domchor, Kölner Kammerorchester, conducted by Helmut Müller-Brühl. Naxos, 2010.
- Haydn: Orlando Paladino. Sunhae Im as Eurilla, Freiburg Baroque Orchestra, conducted by René Jacobs. Euroarts, 2010.
- Gluck: Orpheus and Eurydike. Dance opera directed by Pina Bausch. Sunhae Im as Amor, Balthasar-Neumann-Ensemble & Choir, conducted by Thomas Hengelbrock. Bel Air Classique, 2009.
- Mozart: Don Giovanni. Sunhae Im as Zerlina, Freiburg Baroque Orchestra, conducted by René Jacobs. Harmonia Mundi, 2008.

=== Soundtrack appearances ===
Title	Year	Peak chart positions	Album
Title	Year	KOR	Album
"Will Be Back" (꼭 돌아오리)	2016	88	Moon Lovers: Scarlet Heart Ryeo OST part 9
