= Johannes Boehland =

German painter

- Born: 16 April 1903; Berlin, Germany
- Died: 5 September 1964 (aged 61); Berlin, Germany
- Occupation: Painter

Johannes Boehland (16 April 1903 – 5 September 1964) was a German painter. His work was part of the art competitions at the 1932 Summer Olympics and the 1936 Summer Olympics.
