= Real Compañía Ópera de Cámara =

The Real Compañía Ópera de Cámara de Barcelona orchestra (RCOC) (English "Royal Chamber Opera Company from Barcelona", Catalan "Reial Companyía Òpera de Cambra de Barcelona") is a Spanish early music ensemble based in Barcelona. It was founded by its conductor Juan Bautista Otero. The orchestra has been instrumental in reviving several long unperformed Baroque operas.

== Discography ==
- Domènec Terradellas Sesostri. Sunhae Im, Alexandrina Pendatchanska, Kenneth Tarver, Ditte Andersen, Rafaella Milanesi, Tom Randle. RCOC 3 CDs.
- Vicente Martín y Soler. Ifigenia in Aulide. K617 2 CDs
- Soler. 2 cantatas. La dora festeggiante, Il sogno. (70 minutes) RCOC 2 CDs
- Terradellas. Artaserse. Venice, 1744. Opera seria in 3 acts. Anna Maria Panzarella, Celine Ricci, Marina Comparato, RCOC 3 CDs
- Antonio Maria Mazzoni. Aminta, il re pastore. K617 2 CDs
- Nicola Porpora. Orlando. K617 2 CDs

Forthcoming

- Mazzoni. Antigono (Lisbon 1755). CD & DVD Otero RCOC
- Davide Pérez Solimano (Lisbon 1757 & Cádiz 1768). Otero RCOC
- Porpora. Gli Orti Esperidi (Naples 1721). Otero RCOC
