= Hermann Schreiber (pilot) =

Swiss pilot (1909 – 2003)

- Born: 11 November 1909; Arth-Goldau, Switzerland
- Died: 12 April 2003 (aged 93); Gersau, Switzerland
- Occupation: Pilot
- Known for: First to fly over the Alps in a glider

Hermann Schreiber (11 November 1909 – 12 April 2003) was a Swiss pilot. He is known for being the first person to cross the Alps in a glider, for which he won an Olympic gold medal in aeronautics at the 1936 Summer Olympics.

Schreiber's historic flight is reported by most sources to have taken place in 1935, specifically on September 6 or 7. Thomas Lippert of the Journal of Sports Philately stated the flight was on August 4, 1933. The flight, which took 5 hours and 47 minutes, began in Thun and finished in Bellinzona. Schreiber received a gold medal for his flight at the 1936 Summer Olympics closing ceremony, and is the only person to have ever received an Olympic medal for aeronautics, since the prize was subsequently discontinued. He also competed in the demonstration event of gliding at that same Games.

On August 6, 1937, Schreiber crossed the Alps again in a glider, which is considered the first complete crossing, as Schreiber's first flight had begun at 3,650 metres altitude. Schreiber was the 1937 Swiss champion in gliding and set multiple national records in continuous flight.

Schreiber worked as a military pilot, flight instructor and air crash investigation expert. In the 1960s, he became a bush pilot and worked for relief organizations around the world. In 1976, his family left him because they could not cope with his lifestyle. His daughter Sabine (1962–2012) was a renowned historian and feminist.
