= Catacoustic Consort =

The Catacoustic Consort is an early music chamber ensemble based in Cincinnati, Ohio. It was founded in 2001 by Annalisa Pappano. It specializes in historically informed performances of Baroque and Renaissance music.

== History ==
Since its founding in 2001, the Catacoustic Consort has offered a concert season each year. Annalisa Pappano, the artistic director, performs on viola da gamba, pardessus de viole, and lirone. The organization frequently collaborates with outside performers including Michael Leopold, theorbo, Joanna Blendulf, viola da gamba, David Walker, theorbo, Elizabeth Motter, baroque harp, Daniel Swenberg, theorbo, and Youngmi Kim, soprano. In 2003 Catacoustic won the Grand prize in the Naxos/Early Music America recording competition for their performance of a selection of 17th century Italian laments, featuring Monteverdi's Lamento d'Arianna. This performance was released on the Naxos label as a CD entitled The Italian Dramatic Lament in 2005.

The Catacoustic Consort has toured extensively. It has performed for the San Francisco Early Music Society, at the Madison Early Music Festival, and at Western Michigan University's International Congress on Medieval Studies. It has also played at Early Music in Columbus' concert series, and performed in Villa de Leyva, Colombia.

== Discography ==
- The Italian Dramatic Lament. Catacoustic Consort; Annalisa Pappano, artistic director. Naxos Early Music Collection, #8557538
