= Southern Consort of Voices =

Southern Consort of Voices is an SATB adult mixed voice choir, based in Dunedin, New Zealand.

Southern Consort was first set up in Dunedin in 1980 by Professor Jack Speirs. As the conductor of the Southern Consort, he introduced audiences to a new palette of choral sounds, bringing contemporary music back from Europe by composers such as John Tavener, Arvo Pärt, and James MacMillan.

Through the choir, conductor Spiers also championed many New Zealand composers, including several composers-in-residence at Otago University, and supported a number of students in learning the art of conducting. In addition, there have been many joint ventures or partnerships between the University of Otago Music Department and Southern Consort, a tradition that has continued over the last decade.

Since Jack Speirs's time, subsequent conductors included Holly Mathieson (2000-1), Andrew Crooks (2002), Maureen Smith (2003–2006) and current director Daniel Kelly (2006–present). The choir's patron is Honor McKellar. The choir celebrated its 30th anniversary in June 2010.

The choir is SATB mixed voice, and takes on new members by audition. It performs as many as half a dozen concerts per year, and rehearsals are weekly, on Mondays.
