= The Newberry Consort =

The Newberry Consort is an early music ensemble from Chicago, Illinois. It was established in 1986 and is affiliated with the Newberry Library Center for Renaissance Studies. The Consort is also in residence at the University of Chicago and Northwestern University. Reviewer Alan Artner praised a 2014 performance of the Consort as "...spiritedly played and sung... early music at its committed best."

The group performs music from the Medieval, Renaissance, and Baroque periods featuring a roster of local and international musicians. The Consort has recorded several albums for the Harmonia Mundi USA label.

== Director ==
- Liza Malamut, trombone

== Frequent and Recent Collaborators ==
- Tom Zajac, multi-instrumentalist and vocalist
- David Schrader, harpsichord
- Charles Metz, harpsichord
- Rachel Barton Pine, violin and rebec
- Bruce Dickey, cornetto
- Jeremy Ward, bass violin
- Brandi Berry, violin and viola
- Steven Player, vocalist and dancer
