= Sofie Vanden Eynde =

Belgian musician

- Born: Lommel, Belgium.
- Genres: Renaissance music, Baroque music, world music
- Occupation: Instrumentalist
- Instruments: lute, theorbo
- Website: www.sofievandeneynde.be

Sofie Vanden Eynde (also written Sofie Van Den Eynde) is a Belgian lutenist and member of the music groups Imago Mundi and Murmuring Muses and Whispering Jinn.

Vanden Eynde was born in Lommel, Belgium. In 2012, she formed the ensemble Imago Mundi. In 2014, Imago Mundi released the album 'Divine Madness'. Vanden Eynde's album 'En Suite' recorded with Romina Lischka was chosen as the best Flemish classical CD of 2015 at the annual classical music awards organised by VRT. The Times of Malta described her as having gained "an international reputation as a specialist in historical plucked instruments“.
