= 1936 Summer Olympics =

Multi-sport event in Berlin, Germany

Games of the XI Olympiad
- Emblem of the 1936 Summer Olympics
- Location: Berlin, Germany
- Motto: I Call the Youth of the World! (German: Ich rufe die Jugend der Welt!)
- Nations: 49
- Athletes: 3,963 (3,632 men, 331 women)
- Events: 129 in 19 sports (25 disciplines)
- Opening: 1 August 1936
- Closing: 16 August 1936
- Opened by: Chancellor Adolf Hitler
- Cauldron: Fritz Schilgen
- Stadium: Olympiastadion

The 1936 Summer Olympics (German: Olympische Sommerspiele 1936), officially the Games of the XI Olympiad (Spiele der XI. Olympiade) and branded as Berlin 1936, were an international multi-sport event held from 1 to 16 August 1936 in Berlin, Germany. Berlin won the right to host the Games over Barcelona at the 29th IOC Session in 1931. The 1936 Games were the second and last occasion on which the International Olympic Committee (IOC) chose a host by a ballot in which the bidding cities themselves could vote; later rules barred cities that voted from being selected.

The Games had been awarded to Germany during the Weimar Republic, but by 1936 the country was governed by the Nazi regime, and Adolf Hitler's government treated the Olympics as an opportunity for propaganda. To project an image of a peaceful, tolerant Germany, the authorities temporarily removed antisemitic signage and softened the most visible forms of persecution for the duration of the Games. At the same time, the German Olympic authorities barred nearly all Jewish and Romani athletes from the national team; the fencer Helene Mayer, who had one Jewish parent, was the only such athlete to represent Germany. A movement to boycott or relocate the Games developed in several countries—Czechoslovakia, France, the Netherlands, Sweden, the United Kingdom, and the United States—but it ultimately failed. Forty-nine nations competed, the largest number at any Olympics to that point.

These were the first Games to be televised and the first to feature a torch relay carrying the Olympic flame from Olympia to the host city—a ceremony devised for Berlin that became a permanent Olympic tradition. The filmmaker Leni Riefenstahl recorded the Games for her two-part film Olympia, which pioneered techniques still used in sports cinematography.

Jesse Owens of the United States won four gold medals in the sprint and long jump events, and became the most successful athlete to compete in Berlin, while Germany was the most successful country overall with 101 medals (38 of them gold); the United States placed a distant second with 57 medals. These were the final Olympic Games under the IOC presidency of Henri de Baillet-Latour. For the next 12 years, no Olympic Games were held due to the immense world disruption caused by the Second World War. The next Olympic Games were held in 1948 (the Winter Games in St. Moritz, Switzerland, and then the Summer Games in London, England).

== Host city selection ==
At the 28th IOC Session in Berlin in May 1930, fourteen cities indicated an intention to bid for the 1936 Summer Olympics. By the 29th Session, held in Barcelona in April 1931, only Barcelona and Berlin remained in contention; the other cities—Alexandria, Budapest, Buenos Aires, Cologne, Dublin, Frankfurt, Helsinki, Lausanne, Montevideo, Nuremberg, Rio de Janeiro, and Rome—had withdrawn. Several of these cities later hosted the Games: Helsinki in 1952, Rome in 1960, Barcelona in 1992 and Rio de Janeiro in 2016.

The 1936 Games were the first for which the host was decided by a vote of each individual IOC member rather than by the assembled Session alone. The deadline for ballots was 13 May 1931, two weeks after the Barcelona Session. Of 67 voting members, 19 cast ballots during the Session and 40 by post to the IOC headquarters in Lausanne; eight abstained. The result was 43 votes for Berlin and 16 for Barcelona. Barcelona's prospects were probably weakened by the political uncertainty that followed the proclamation of the Second Spanish Republic days before the Session.

After the Nazi seizure of power in 1933 and the regime's early antisemitic measures, some IOC members privately discussed moving the Games, and the US Olympic Association briefly suggested transferring them to Rome. Hitler's government gave assurances that Jewish athletes would not be excluded from the German team, and the proposal was not seriously pursued.

== Background and political context ==
Awarded to Berlin in 1931 under the Weimar Republic, the Games took on a new character after the Nazi takeover of January 1933, as the regime grasped their value as international propaganda.

=== Nazi propaganda and the "beautification" of Berlin ===
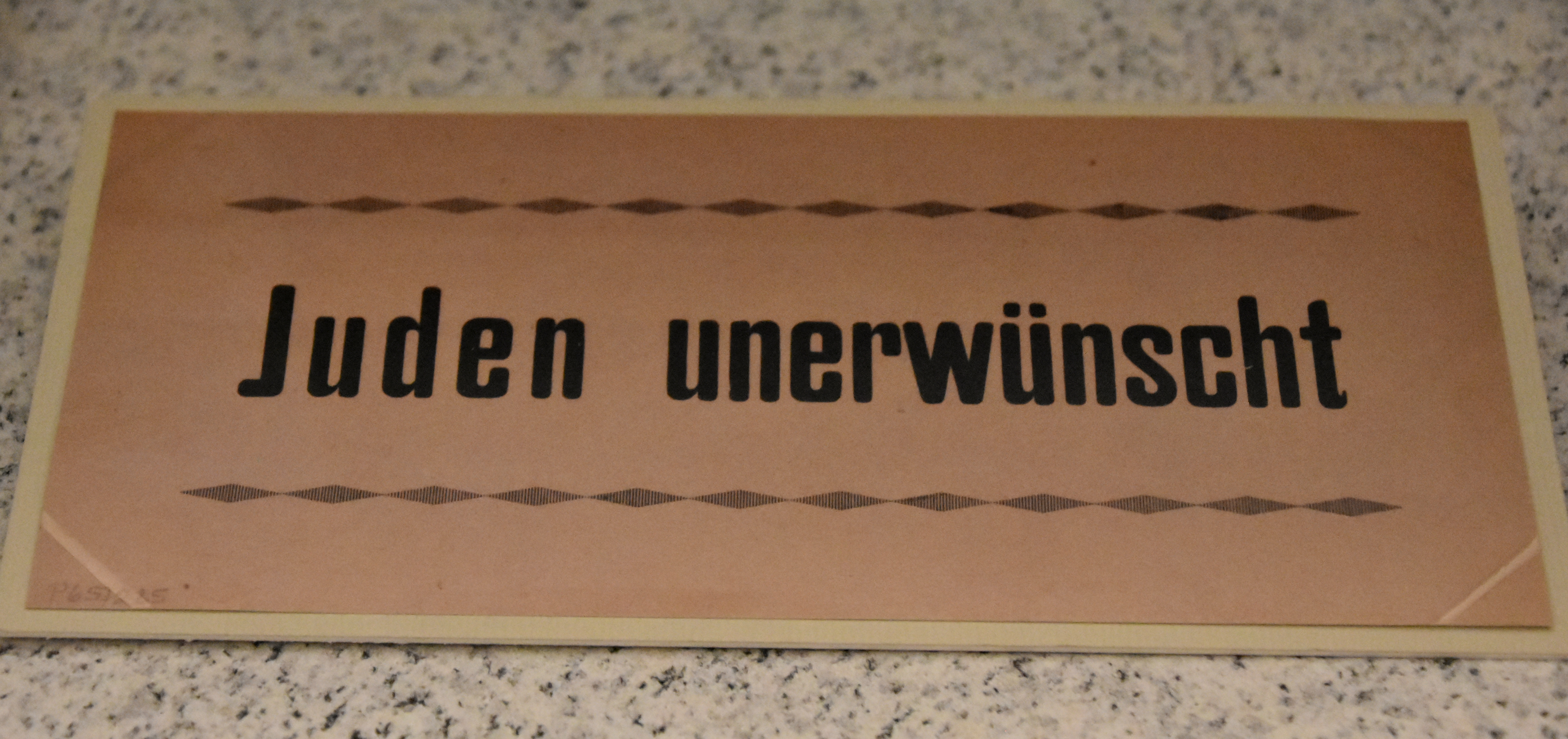
A "Jews not welcome" sign of the kind removed for the Games

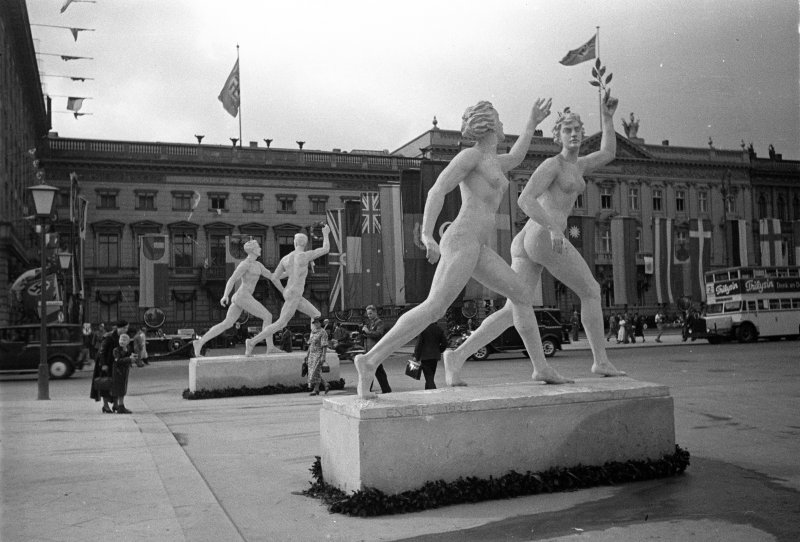
Nude statues installed in Berlin's streets

Hitler regarded the Games as a chance to promote his government and its ideology of Aryan supremacy. The official Nazi paper, the Völkischer Beobachter, had argued in the strongest terms that Jewish and black athletes should be barred from the Olympics. As the Games approached, however, the regime worked to soften Germany's international image: signs reading "Jews not welcome" (German: Juden unerwünscht) were taken down from public places for the duration, and overt antisemitic agitation was muted.

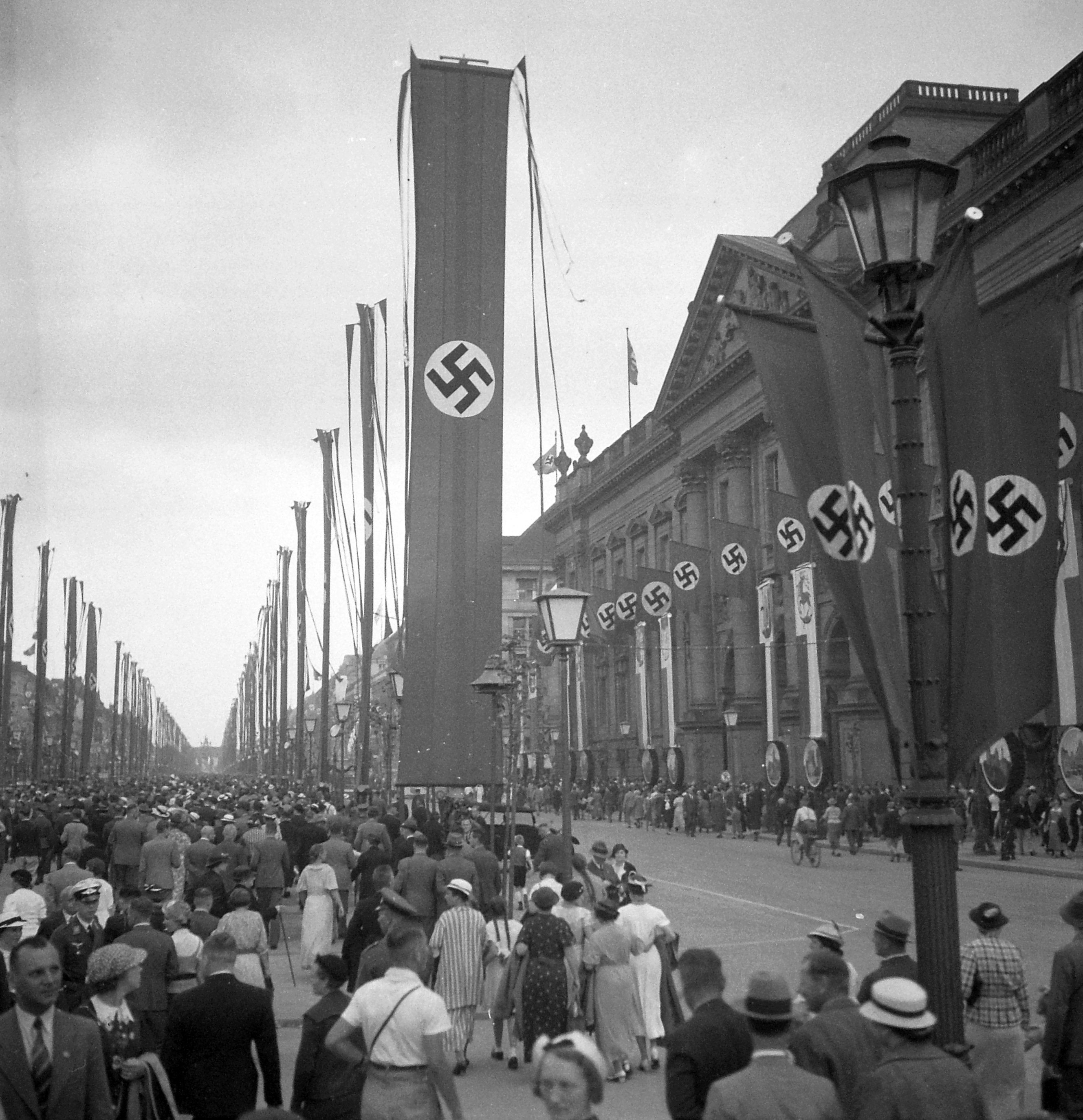
Berlin decked out with German flags during the Games

The effort extended to the removal of people the regime considered undesirable. In July 1936, the Ministry of the Interior authorised Berlin's police to detain the city's Romani and confine them in a special camp at Marzahn, on the city's outskirts. Five months before the opening ceremony, in March 1936, Germany had remilitarised the Rhineland in breach of the Treaty of Versailles, heightening international tension in the months before the Games.

=== Exclusion of Jewish and Roma athletes ===
Aligned with Nazi directives, the German Olympic Committee effectively barred German athletes who were Jewish or Roma, or of such ancestry, from competing. The most prominent excluded athlete was the high jumper Gretel Bergmann, who was dropped from the team shortly after equalling the German record of 1.60 m in June 1936. Others kept off the team included the record-holding track-and-field athlete Lilli Henoch, the tennis player Daniel Prenn, the boxer Erich Seelig and the Sinti boxer Johann Trollmann. Helene Mayer—already an Olympic champion who had emigrated to the United States—returned to fence for Germany and won a silver medal, the only athlete of Jewish descent on the German team, a token inclusion intended to deflect foreign criticism.

The exclusions also reached the organisers. Theodor Lewald, president of the German Olympic Committee, had a Jewish grandparent and was sidelined, while Hauptmann Wolfgang Fürstner, who had overseen construction of the Olympic Village, was reclassified as a Jew under the Nuremberg Laws and demoted shortly before the Games; he took his own life days after they ended.

== Organisation and preparation ==
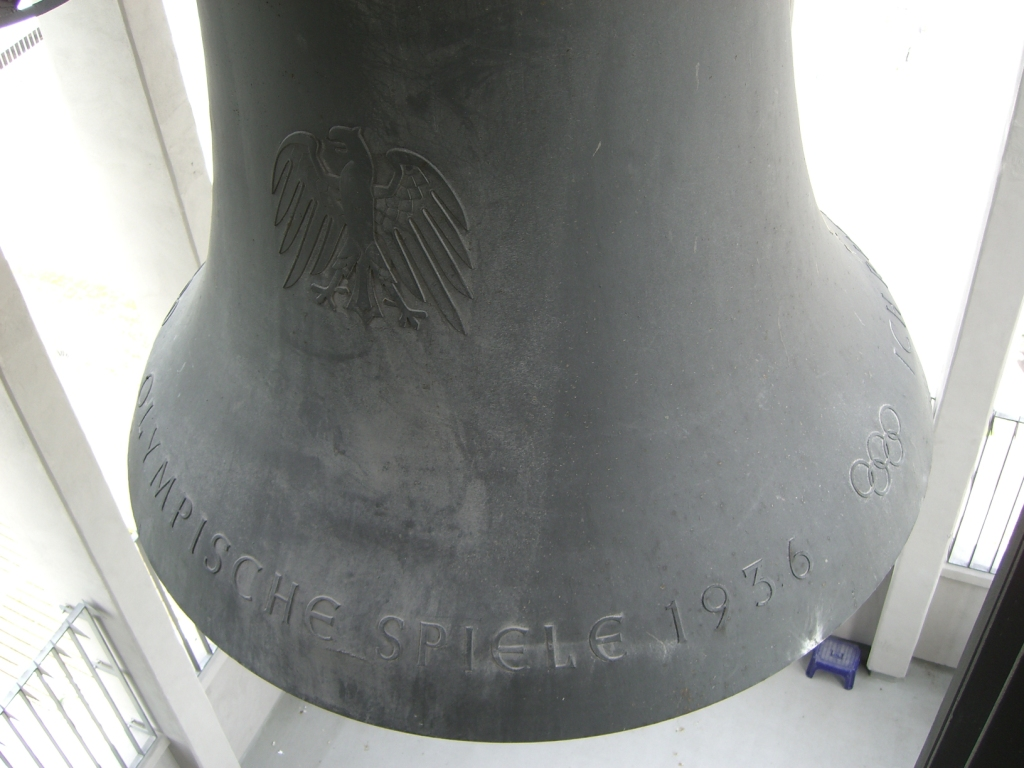
The Olympic Bell, inscribed Ich rufe die Jugend der Welt

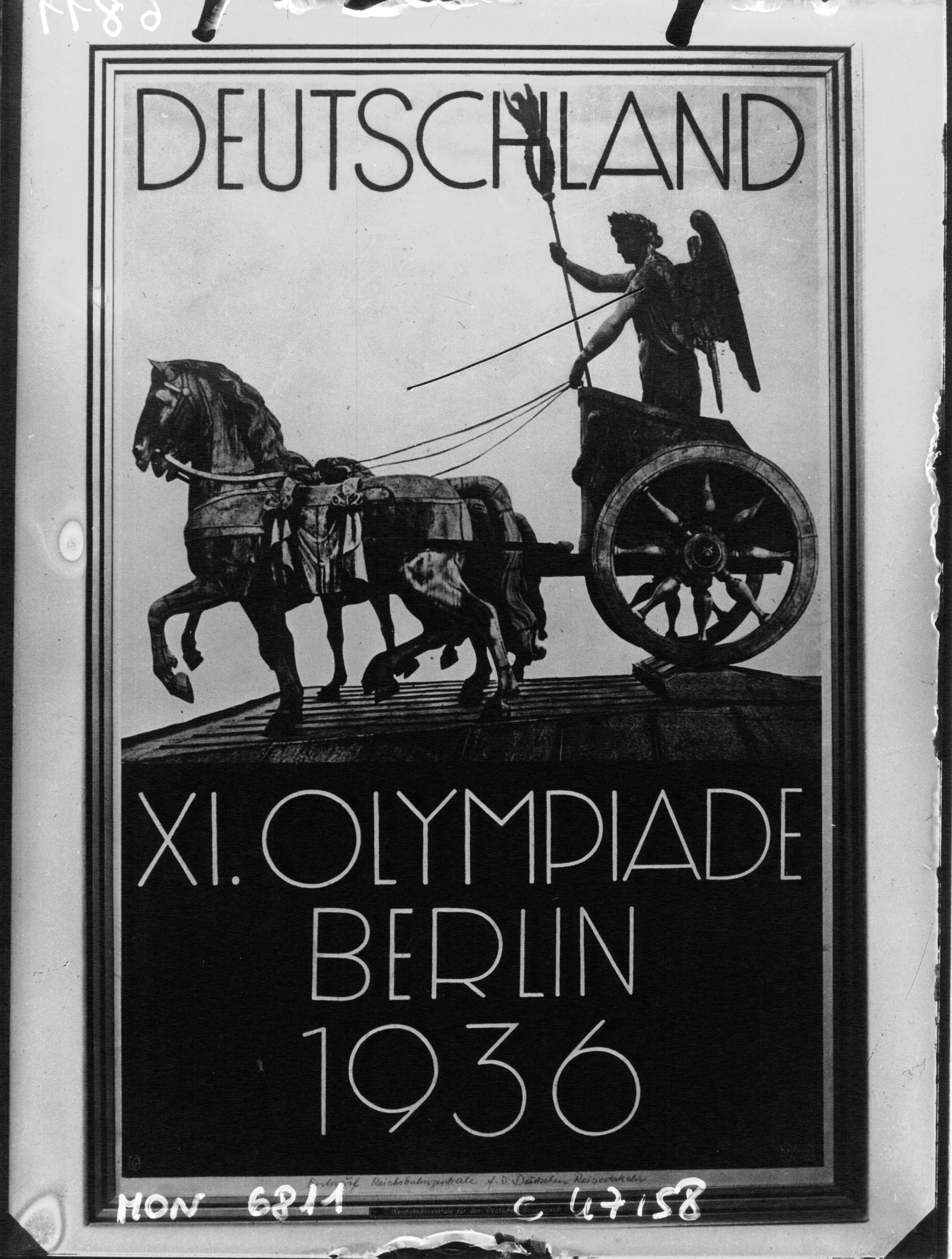
The official Games poster

Overall responsibility for the Games lay with Hans von Tschammer und Osten, the Reichssportführer, though the detailed organisation was handled by Theodor Lewald and Carl Diem, the former president and secretary of Germany's Olympic sports body; Diem, as secretary-general of the organising committee, was the chief promoter of the torch relay from Olympia to Berlin. The Games' emblem, designed by the artist Johannes Boehland, originally combined the Olympic rings, the German eagle and the Brandenburg Gate; on Lewald's suggestion its lower part was opened out into the shape of a bell, and the resulting Olympic Bell, inscribed with the motto 'I call the youth of the world', became one of the Games' lasting symbols.

=== Torch relay ===
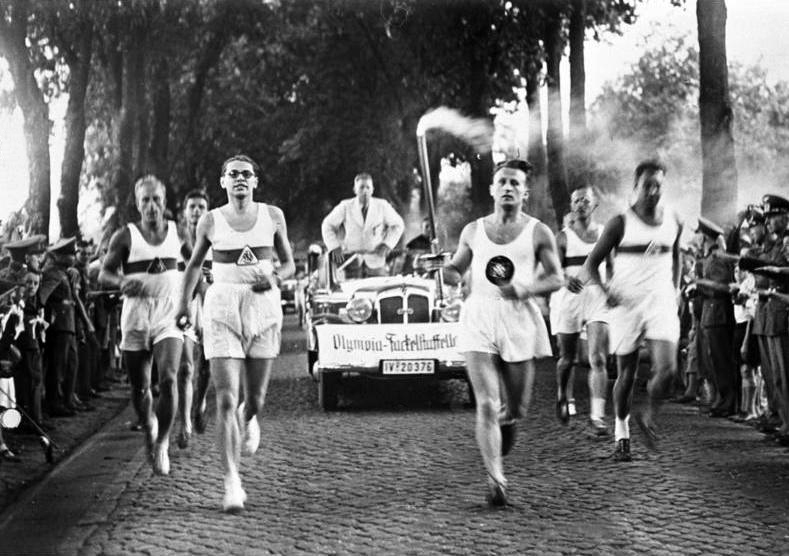
Runners carrying the Olympic flame

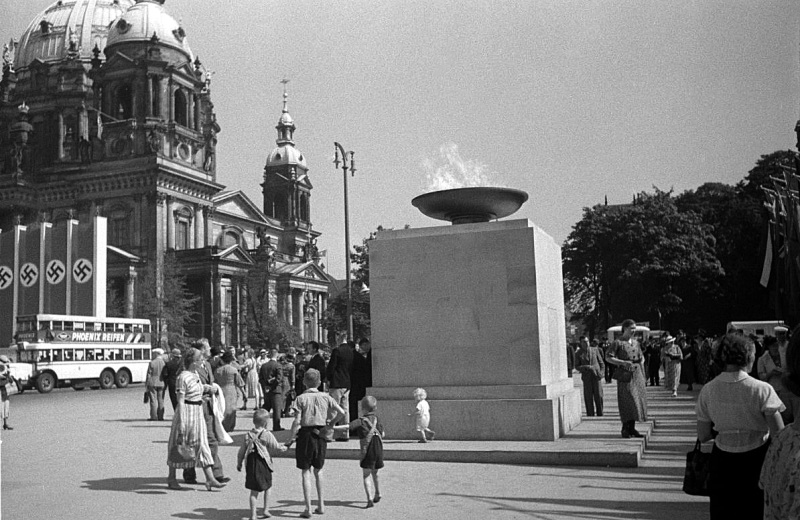
The flame at the stadium

Although the Olympic flame had been reintroduced at the 1928 Summer Olympics, Berlin staged the first torch relay, carrying a flame kindled at Olympia in Greece to the host city through seven countries. The concept, organised by Diem, established the modern convention later used at every Games, and Riefenstahl incorporated the relay into Olympia.

=== Olympic Village ===
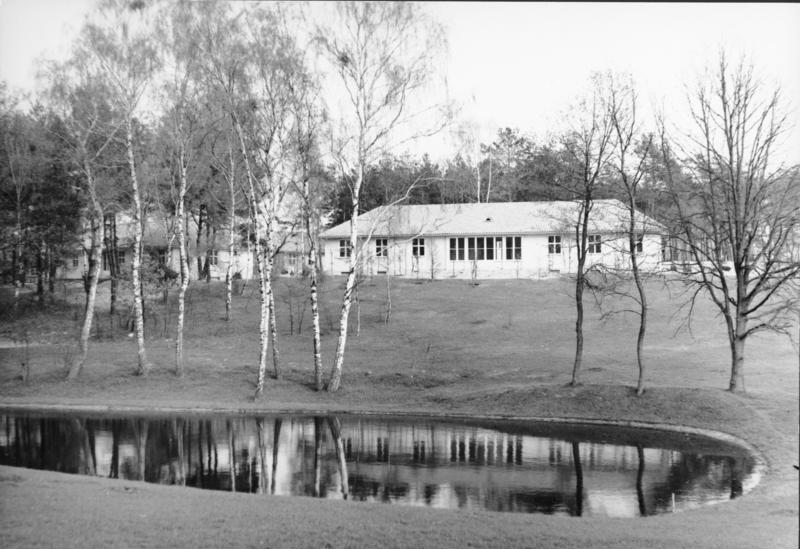
The Village at Elstal

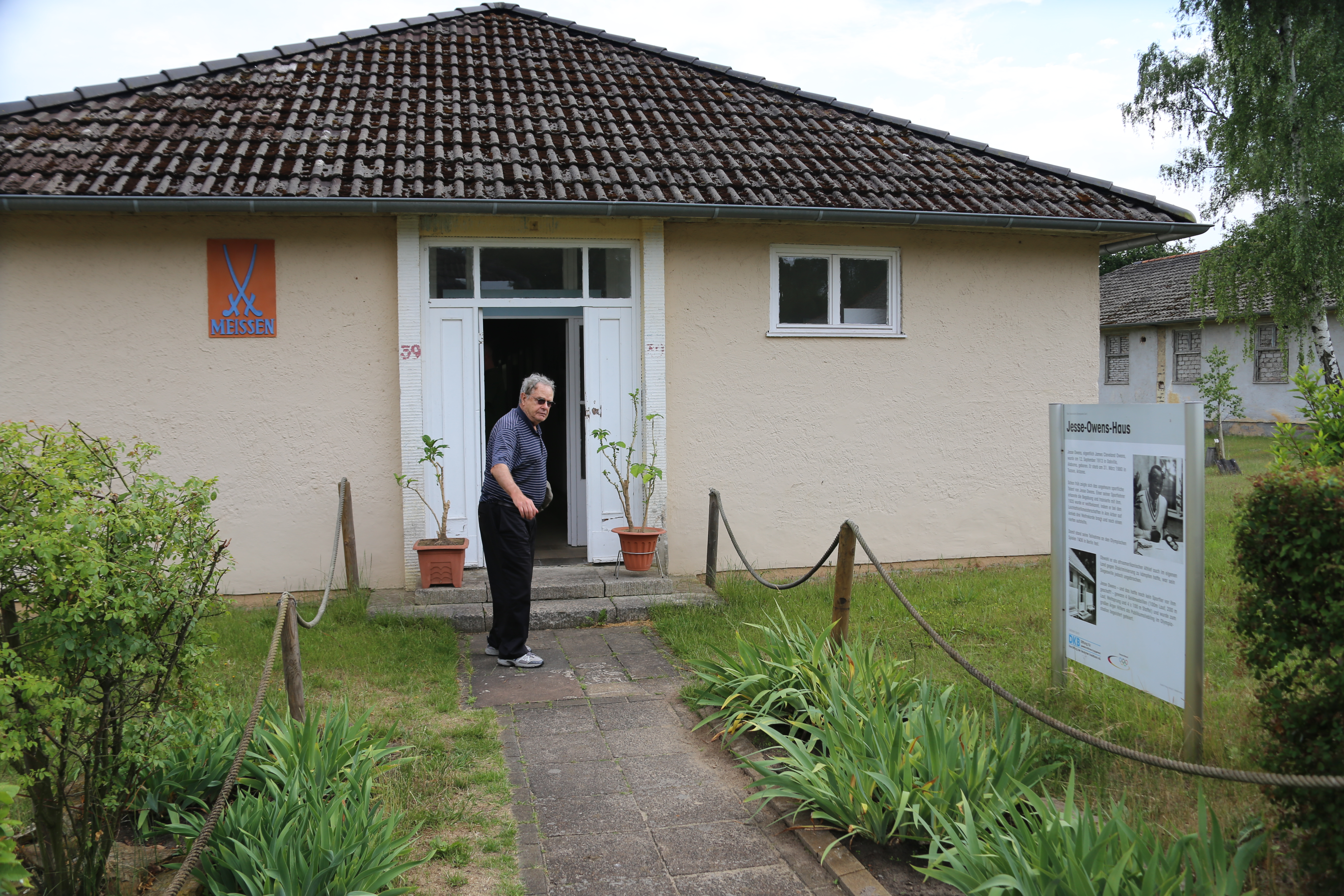
U.S. team house (2015)

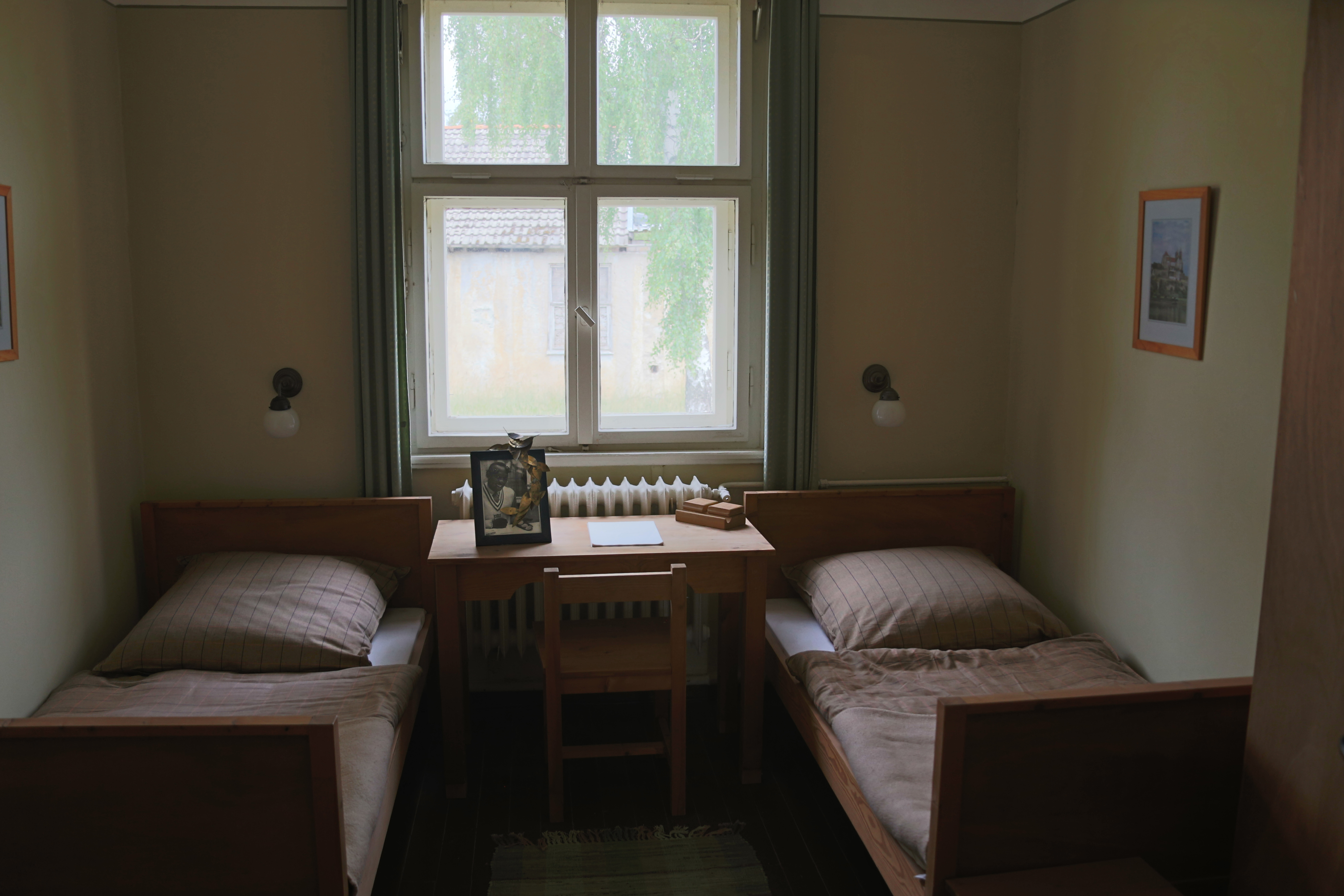
Owens's room (2015)

A 2012 Voice of America report on the preservation of the former Olympic Village

The Olympic Village lay at Elstal in Wustermark, about 30 km west of central Berlin, and comprised low dormitories, a large "Dining Hall of the Nations" (Speisehaus der Nationen), training facilities and a swimming hall. After the Games the site was absorbed by the Wehrmacht and later used by Soviet forces as a military camp; parts of it, including the dormitory used by Jesse Owens, have been restored more recently.

=== Venues ===
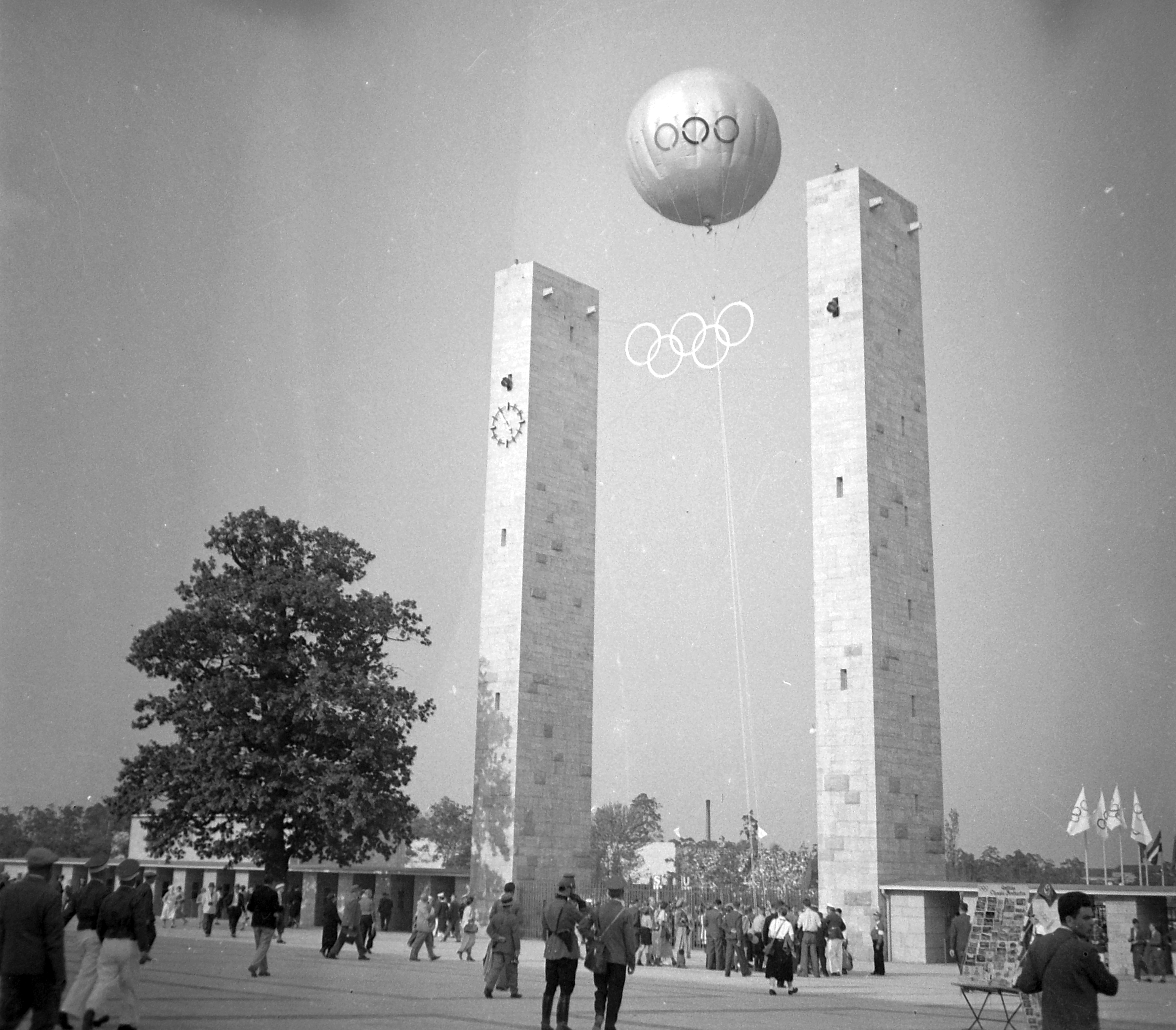
The main entrance of the Olympic Stadium

Twenty-two venues were used, most of them in the purpose-built Reichssportfeld complex, which had been planned for the cancelled 1916 Summer Olympics and was completed in 1934–36. The centrepiece Olympic Stadium seated about 100,000; sailing was held in the Bay of Kiel, later reused for the 1972 Summer Olympics.

Venue	Sports	Capacity
Olympic Stadium	Athletics, equestrian jumping, football final, handball final	100,000
Olympic Swimming Stadium	Diving, swimming, water polo, modern pentathlon (swimming)	20,000
Dietrich Eckart Open-Air Theatre	Gymnastics	20,000
Mayfield (Maifeld)	Equestrian (dressage), polo	75,000
Deutschlandhalle	Boxing, weightlifting, wrestling	8,630
Hockey Stadium	Field hockey	18,000
Grünau Regatta Course	Rowing, canoeing	19,000
Haus des Deutschen Sports	Fencing, modern pentathlon (fencing)	1,200
AVUS	Cycling (road), athletics (marathon, 50 km walk)	not listed
Kiel Bay	Sailing	not listed

=== Broadcasting and film ===
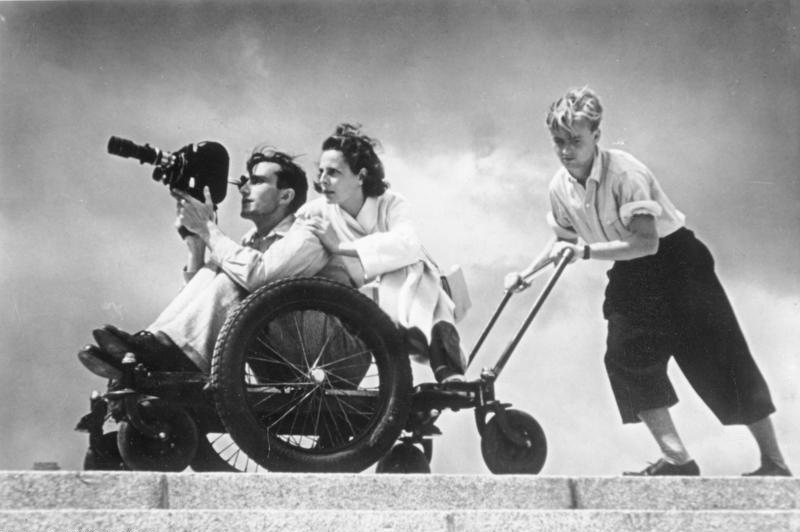
Leni Riefenstahl filming Olympia at the Games, August 1936

The Games were the first to be carried on live television. Using Telefunken equipment, the German Post Office transmitted more than 70 hours of black-and-white coverage to public viewing rooms in Berlin and Potsdam, where more than 162,000 people in all followed the competitions on screens outside the stadium. Radio carried the Games more widely still, in 28 languages across some 2,500 broadcasts. The Games were also an early showcase for colour photography, using Germany's newly developed Agfacolor film. The filmmaker Leni Riefenstahl recorded the Games for her two-part documentary Olympia, released in 1938.

=== Costs ===
The Games were among the most lavish staged to that point, and most of the spending lay well outside the organising committee's own accounts which initially relied on grassroots fundraising before the Nazi government stepped in. Budgeted at roughly 4 million Reichsmark, funding came through a three-year lottery, surcharged stamps, and an "Olympic Penny" added to ticket prices across Germany. Although postage stamps were projected to raise 1 million Reichsmark, their sales generated significantly more revenue. From 1933 the Reich Ministry of the Interior directed a vast building programme that the regime folded into its public-works and job-creation schemes, and historians have treated this state investment—rather than ticket income—as the truer measure of what the Games cost. Its centrepiece, the new Olympic Stadium, was built in barely two years at a cost of around 42 million Reichsmark; with the wider Reichssportfeld, the Olympic Village and new transport links, the state's outlay dwarfed the committee's budget. Hitler also prized the Games as a way to earn scarce foreign currency at a time of dwindling German reserves, later claiming they had brought in large sums. The committee's own books were comparatively modest: ticket sales brought in about 7.5 million RM and an operating profit of over one million RM. The city of Berlin reported costs of about 16.5 million RM, while the national government's total spending was never published in full and has been estimated at around US$30 million. The 1936 Olympics also attracted commercial advertising: Coca-Cola's German subsidiary supplied the drink and promoted it in Berlin during the Games, while local confectioner Hildebrand introduced its caffeinated chocolate Scho-Ka-Kola, marketing it as a "sport chocolate" (German: Sportschokolade). The Winter Games at Garmisch-Partenkirchen earlier that year had featured some of the first official commercial arrangements at an Olympics, with Coca-Cola acting as a sponsor and Ovaltine designated the "official drink".

== The Games ==
The sporting programme ran from 1 to 16 August 1936 and was framed by elaborate opening and closing ceremonies.

=== Opening ceremony ===
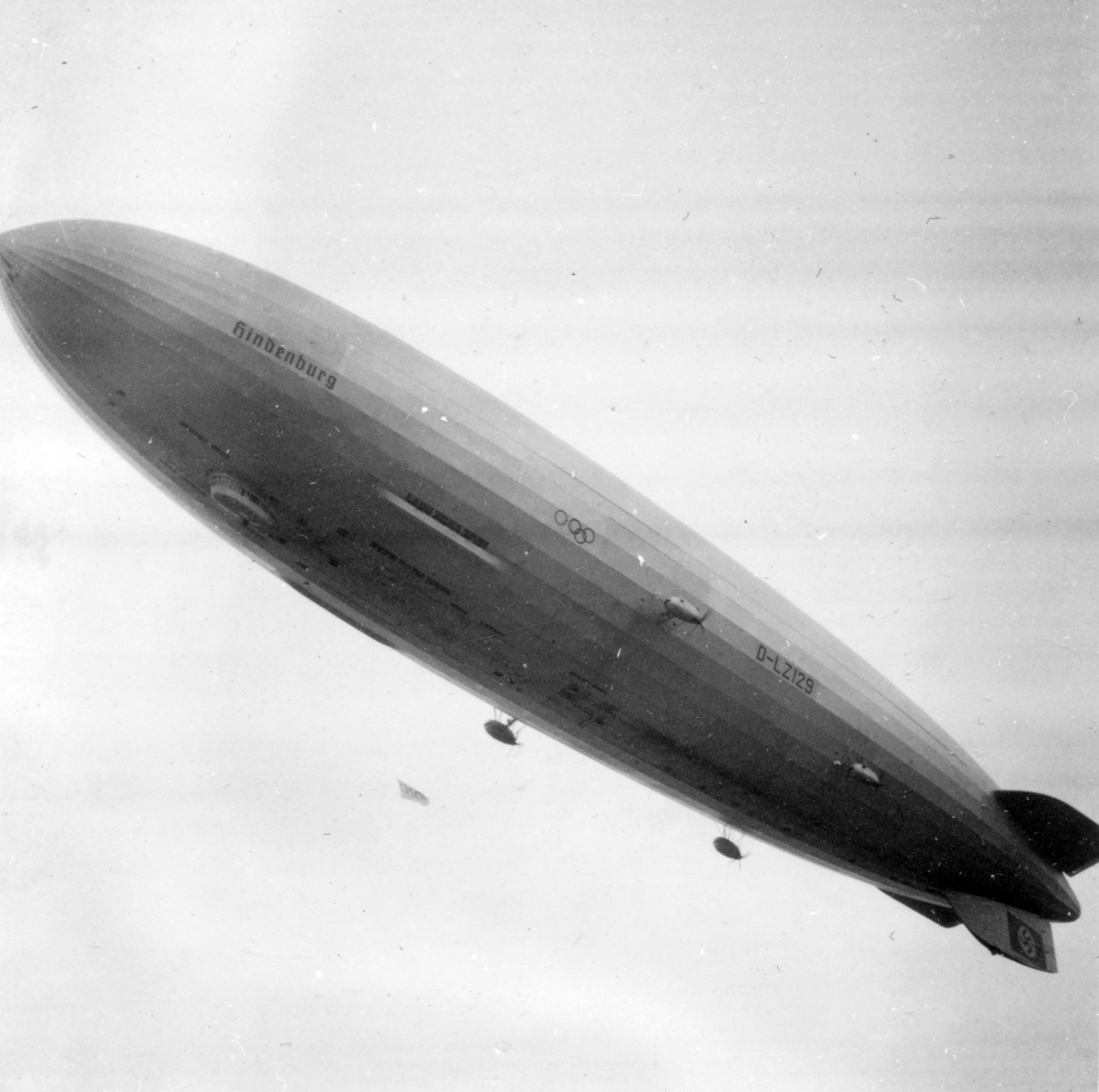
The airship LZ 129 Hindenburg over Berlin

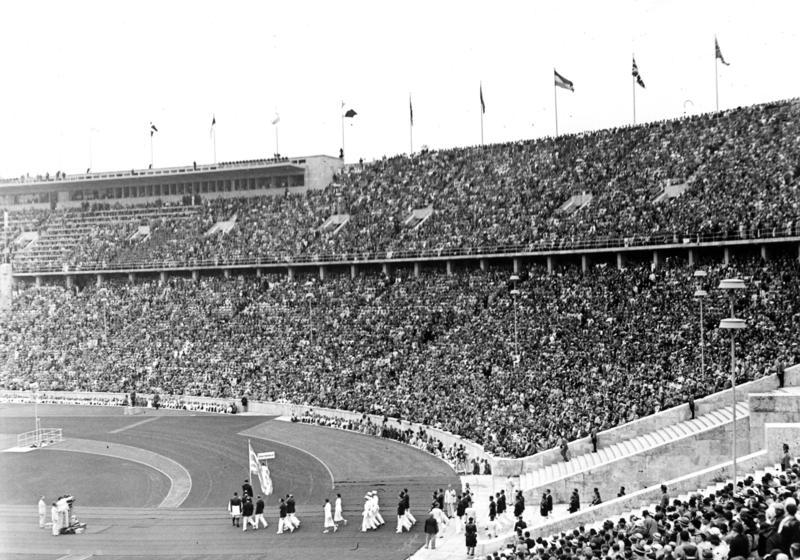
The parade of nations

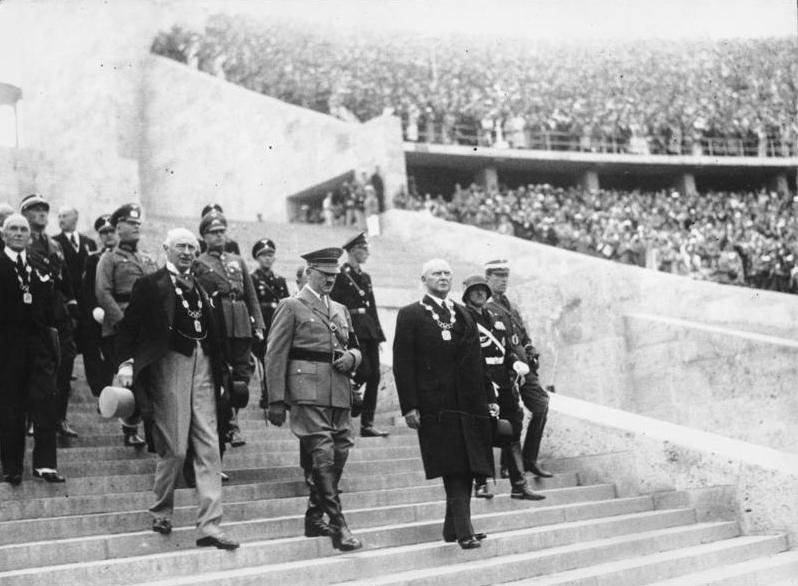
Hitler and Baillet-Latour entering the stadium

The opening ceremony took place at the Olympic Stadium on 1 August 1936. The airship Hindenburg flew over the stadium trailing the Olympic flag. After Hitler's arrival the parade of nations proceeded, with Greece first and the host nation last; some teams gave the Nazi salute or the similar Olympic salute as they passed Hitler's box, with French Olympians giving a Roman salute, while the United States and a few others did not. The Greek team that led the parade was headed by Spyridon Louis, winner of the marathon at the first modern Olympics in 1896, who presented Hitler with an olive branch from Olympia. Hitler then declared the Games open; in keeping with Olympic protocol his part was confined to the set formula—"I proclaim the Games of Berlin, celebrating the eleventh Olympiad of the modern era, to be open"—his only public statement during the Games. A torch-bearer then ran into the arena to light the cauldron, and thousands of pigeons were released. During the ceremony the Olympic Hymn—specially composed by Richard Strauss, who conducted it himself—received its première; Strauss had taken the commission only after the writer Gerhart Hauptmann failed to supply a text, and he privately dismissed the piece even as he led it.

=== Sports ===
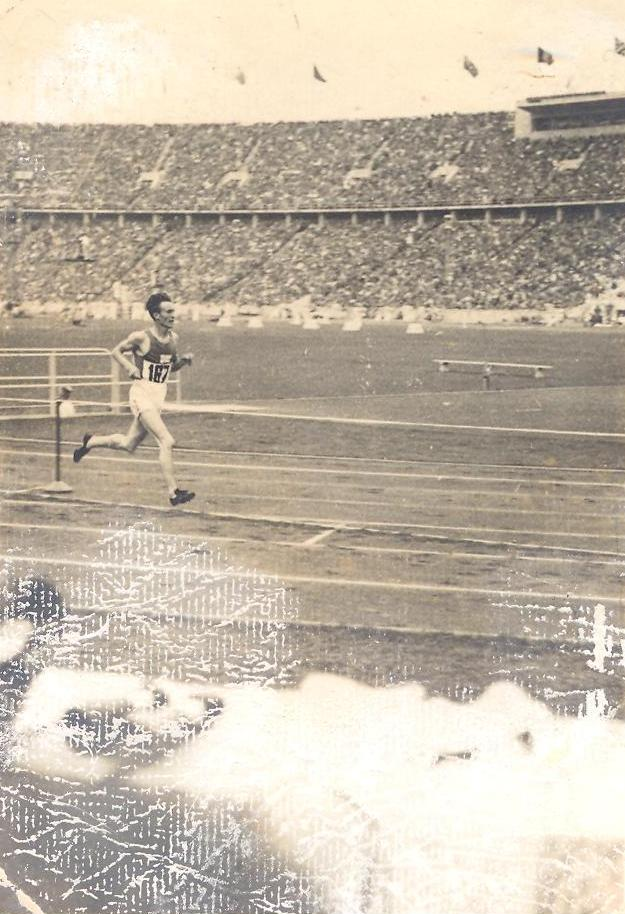
Volmari Iso-Hollo, gold medallist in the 3000 m steeplechase

The programme comprised 129 events in 25 disciplines across 19 sports. Basketball, canoeing and handball made their Olympic debuts; handball would not return until the 1972 Summer Olympics, while polo made its fifth and final Olympic appearance. Baseball and gliding were held as demonstration sports, and art competitions awarded medals, as did feats of alpinism and aeronautics recognised at the closing ceremony.

National strengths were pronounced across the individual sports. The host nation owed its place atop the medal table chiefly to gymnastics, rowing and the equestrian events, in which German riders won all six golds. Athletics, the largest sport, was dominated by the United States, whose men won twelve track-and-field golds; Helen Stephens took two of the six women's events. In the pool the men's programme became a duel between the US and Japan, while Rie Mastenbroek of the Netherlands, the outstanding swimmer of the Games, led Dutch dominance of the women's events; US women instead won both diving titles. France's Robert Charpentier won three cycling golds, and the fencing titles fell mainly to Italy and Hungary.

The team events produced their own milestones. The United States won the first Olympic basketball tournament, beating Canada 19–8 in a final played outdoors on a rain-soaked clay court, with the game's inventor James Naismith on hand to present the medals. Germany won the inaugural field handball competition, an eleven-a-side outdoor game, and Hungary took the water polo, a sport it would go on to dominate. Italy won the football and India a third successive hockey gold, while polo, won by Argentina, was contested for the last time.

- Aquatics
  - Diving
  - Swimming
  - Water polo
- Athletics
- Basketball
- Boxing
- Canoeing
- Cycling (road, track)
- Equestrian
- Fencing
- Field hockey
- Football
- Gymnastics
- Handball
- Modern pentathlon
- Polo
- Rowing
- Sailing
- Shooting
- Weightlifting
- Wrestling

=== Notable achievements ===
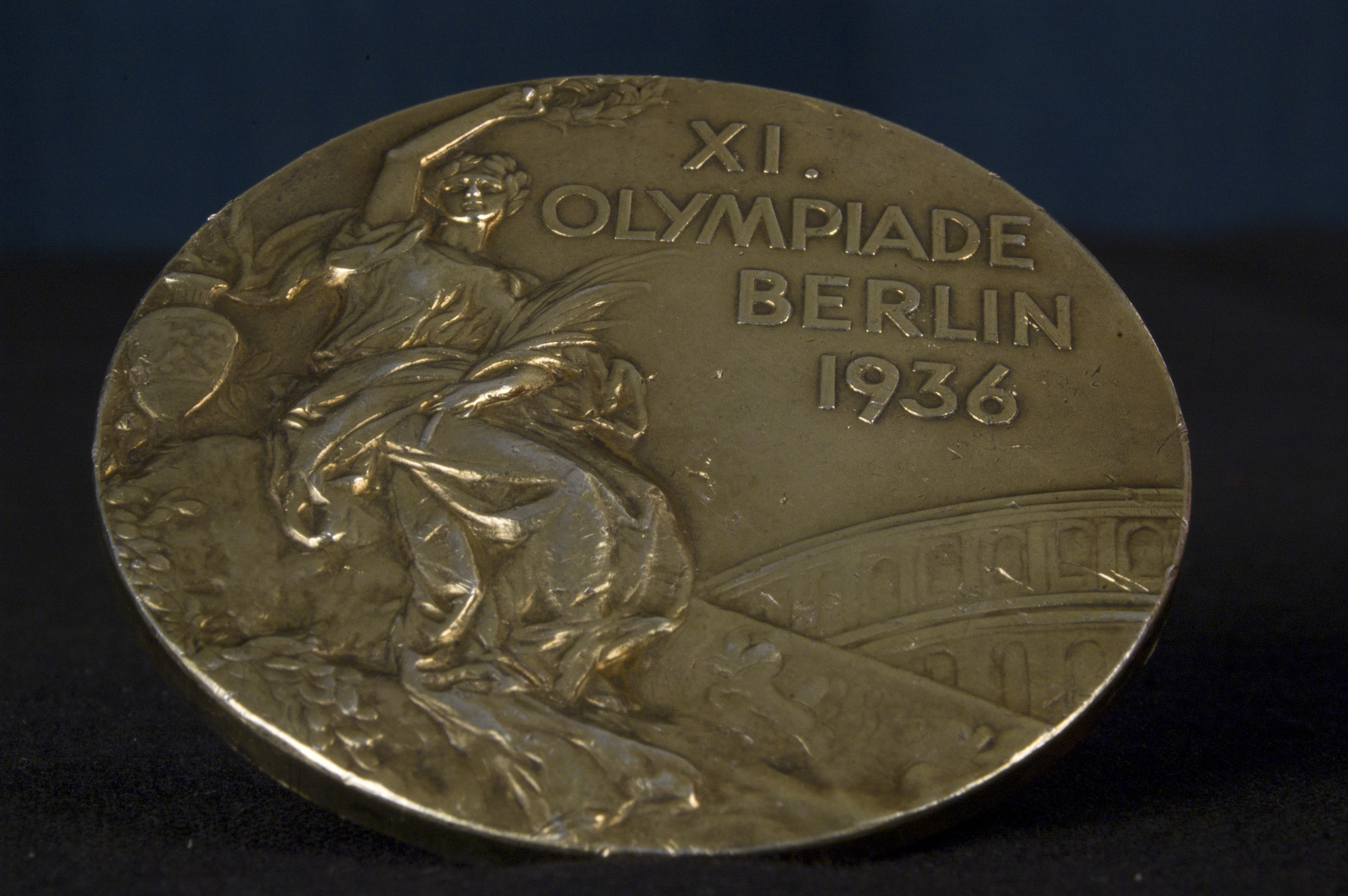
Obverse

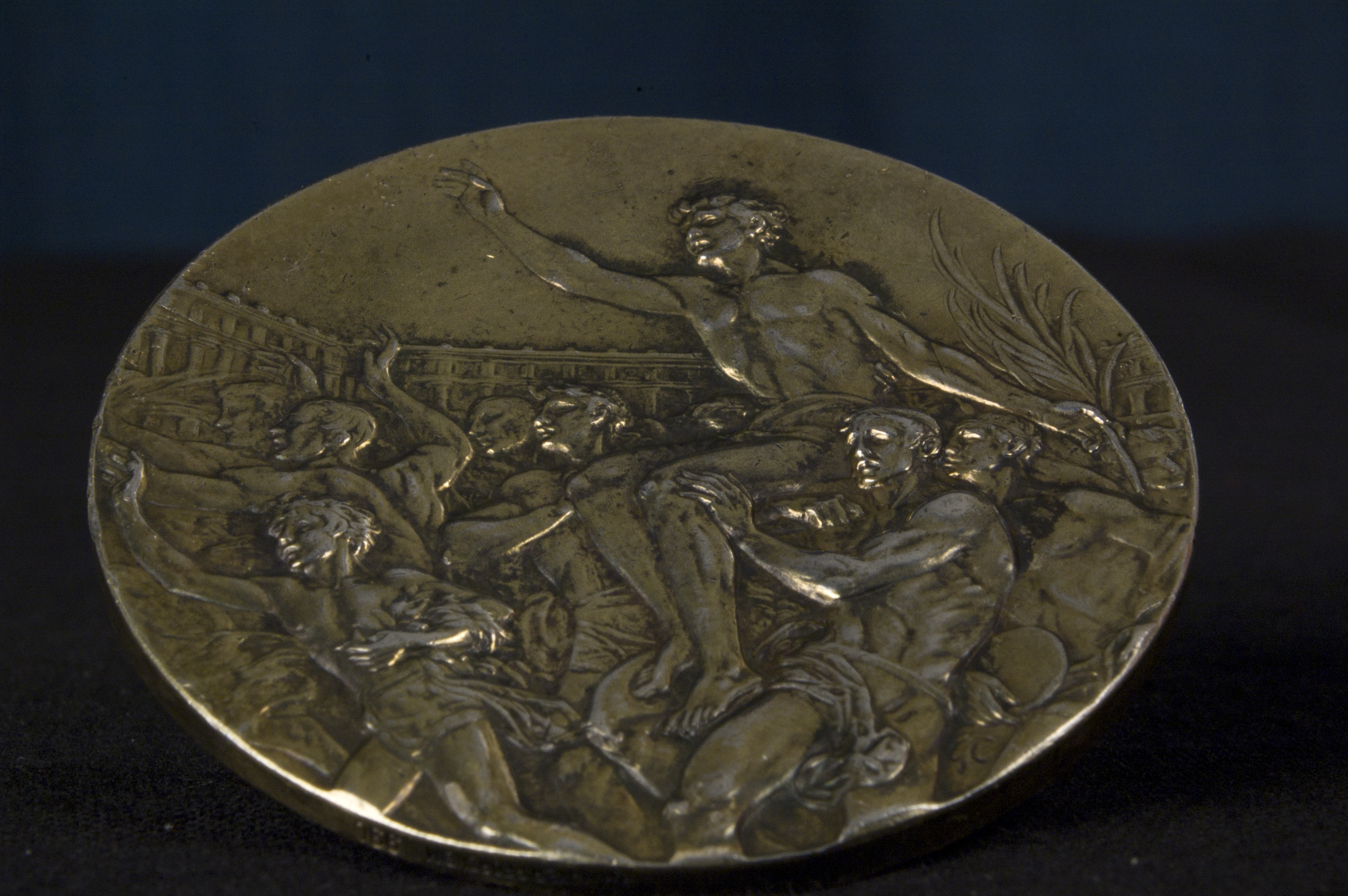
Reverse

A victor's medal, won here by John Woodruff

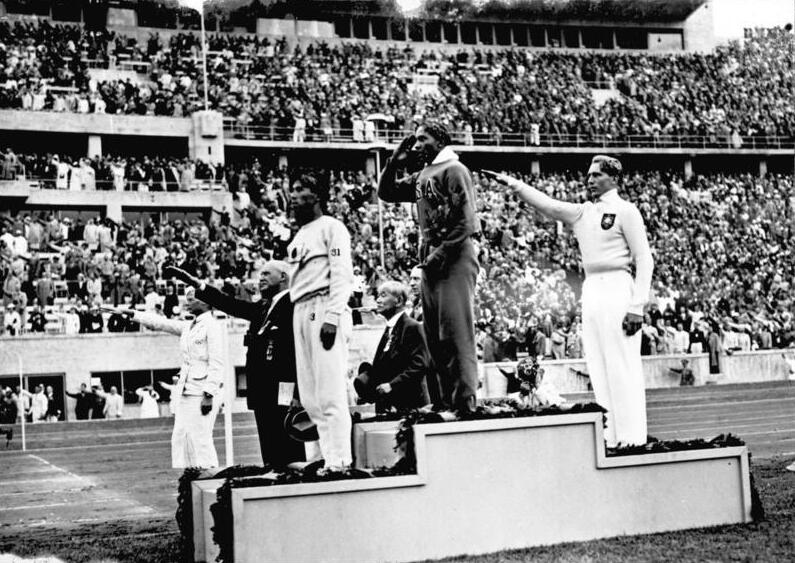
The long-jump victory ceremony: gold medallist Jesse Owens with silver medallist Luz Long and bronze medallist Naoto Tajima

The outstanding individual performer was Jesse Owens of the United States, who won gold in the 100 m, 200 m, long jump, and 4×100 m relay. In the long jump his German rival Luz Long offered him advice after he nearly failed to qualify, and the two were publicly cordial. Mack Robinson, brother of Jackie Robinson, took 200 m silver behind Owens. In the 800 m, John Woodruff won gold after deliberately slowing to free himself when boxed in. Jack Lovelock of New Zealand won the 1500 m in a world-record 3:47.8. In the decathlon, Glenn Morris of the United States set a world record of 7,900 points to lead an American medal sweep, and Ondina Valla took the 80 m hurdles to become the first Italian woman to win an Olympic title, in a final so close that the first four finishers were given the same time. In the pole vault, the Japanese team-mates Shuhei Nishida and Sueo Ōe tied for second and refused to jump off against each other; officials awarded the silver to Nishida and the bronze to Ōe, and on returning home the pair had the medals cut in half and rejoined so that each kept a half-silver, half-bronze "medal of friendship".

German athletes were strong in several sports, sweeping all six equestrian golds and, in the gymnasts Konrad Frey and Alfred Schwarzmann, producing two triple gold medallists. The equestrian team eventing title owed much to Konrad von Wangenheim, who finished the cross-country phase despite breaking his collarbone in a fall and returned the next day—his arm in a sling—to complete the jumping after he and his horse fell again. Rie Mastenbroek of the Netherlands won three swimming golds and a silver, and the Estonian Kristjan Palusalu became the only wrestler to win both the freestyle and Greco-Roman heavyweight titles at a single Games. The Egyptian weightlifter Khadr El Touni won the middleweight gold with a world-record total, beating the German silver medallist by a wide margin.

In the football tournament, Italy—coached by Vittorio Pozzo between their two FIFA World Cup wins—took gold; the result was claimed by supporters of Benito Mussolini as a vindication of fascism. Peru had beaten Austria 4–2 after extra time amid a disputed pitch invasion, but the IOC ordered a replay behind closed doors; Peru refused and withdrew from the Games, as did Colombia in sympathy. On its Olympic football debut, Japan came from two goals down to beat the favoured Swedes 3–2 before being eliminated by Italy in the next round. India won its third consecutive hockey gold, defeating Germany 8–1 in the final. In the marathon, the Korean runners Sohn Kee-chung and Nam Sung-yong won gold and bronze while competing for Japan, which then ruled Korea as a colony. On the podium Sohn bowed his head during the Japanese anthem in silent protest and held his victor's oak seedling over the Japanese emblem on his shirt (some accounts say a laurel wreath); a Korean newspaper, the Dong-a Ilbo, had eight of its staff jailed and was suspended for some nine months after it published a photograph with the flag erased from his chest. More than half a century later, Sohn carried the Olympic flame into the stadium at the 1988 Summer Olympics in Seoul. The United States eight, from the University of Washington, won the rowing title with a come-from-behind final, later recounted in The Boys in the Boat. The 13-year-old US Marjorie Gestring won the 3 m springboard, and Betty Robinson, the 1928 100 m champion who had nearly died in a 1931 plane crash, returned to win gold in the 4×100 m relay.

The American Jewish sprinters Marty Glickman and Sam Stoller were dropped from the 4×100 m relay on the morning of the race in favour of Owens and Ralph Metcalfe; the decision has been widely attributed to a wish not to embarrass the German hosts, though the reasons remain disputed.

The German wrestler Werner Seelenbinder, a committed communist, is said to have intended to refuse the Nazi salute on the victory podium, but he finished fourth in the Greco-Roman light-heavyweight class and so was never in line for a medal ceremony; active in the anti-Nazi resistance, he was arrested in 1942 and executed in 1944.

=== Closing ceremony ===
The Games closed on the evening of 16 August 1936 before a crowd of more than 100,000 in the Olympic Stadium. Historians have described the closing as more sombre and militaristic than the opening, marked by columns of soldiers and fireworks. As the ceremony reached its climax, searchlights ringed the arena to form a "dome of light" overhead, the five-ringed Olympic flag was slowly lowered, and the flame that had burned since 1 August was extinguished as the spectators joined in a closing choral hymn.

IOC president Henri de Baillet-Latour formally declared the Games closed. These were the last Olympics of his presidency and, as it proved, the last for twelve years; the 1940 Games had already been awarded to Tokyo at the IOC session held in Berlin on 31 July 1936, before the Olympics even opened.

Two unusual special awards were also recognised in connection with the closing. An Olympic gold for alpinism went to the mountaineers Günter and Hettie Dyhrenfurth for their Himalayan expeditions, and the only Olympic gold ever awarded for aeronautics went to the Swiss pilot Hermann Schreiber for the first glider flight across the Alps; neither prize was contested again.

== Participating nations ==
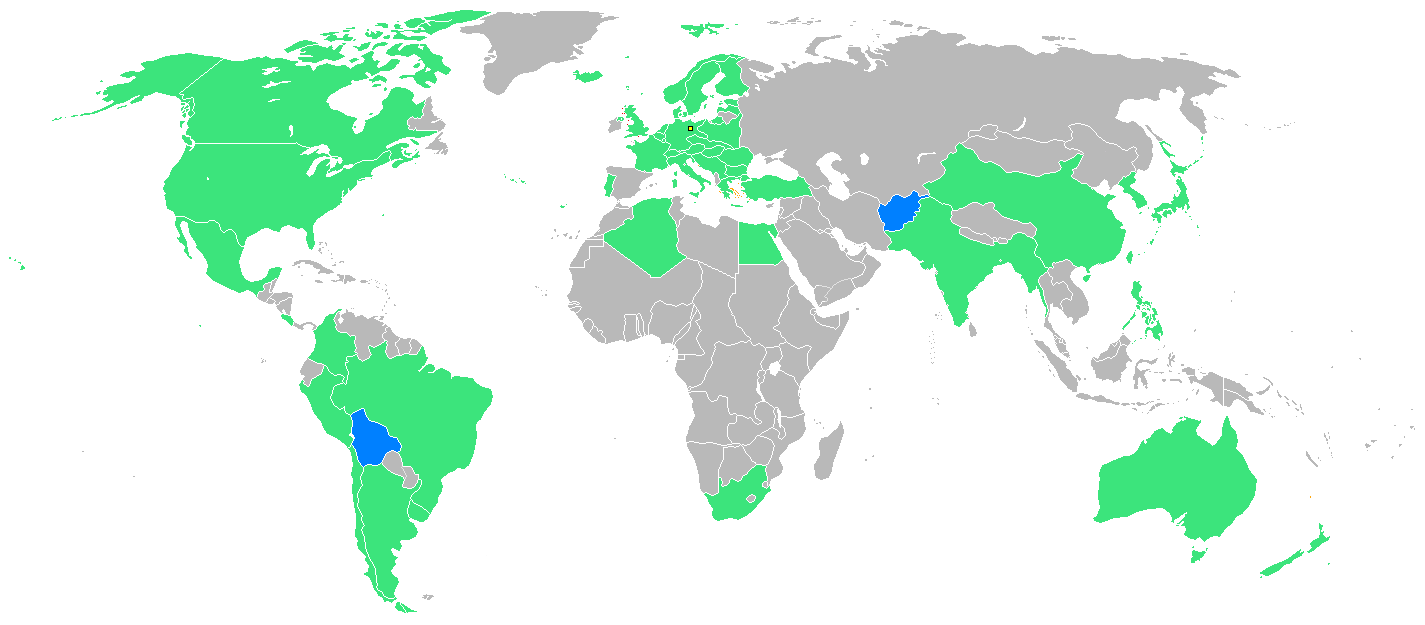
Participating nations, with those competing for the first time shown in blue

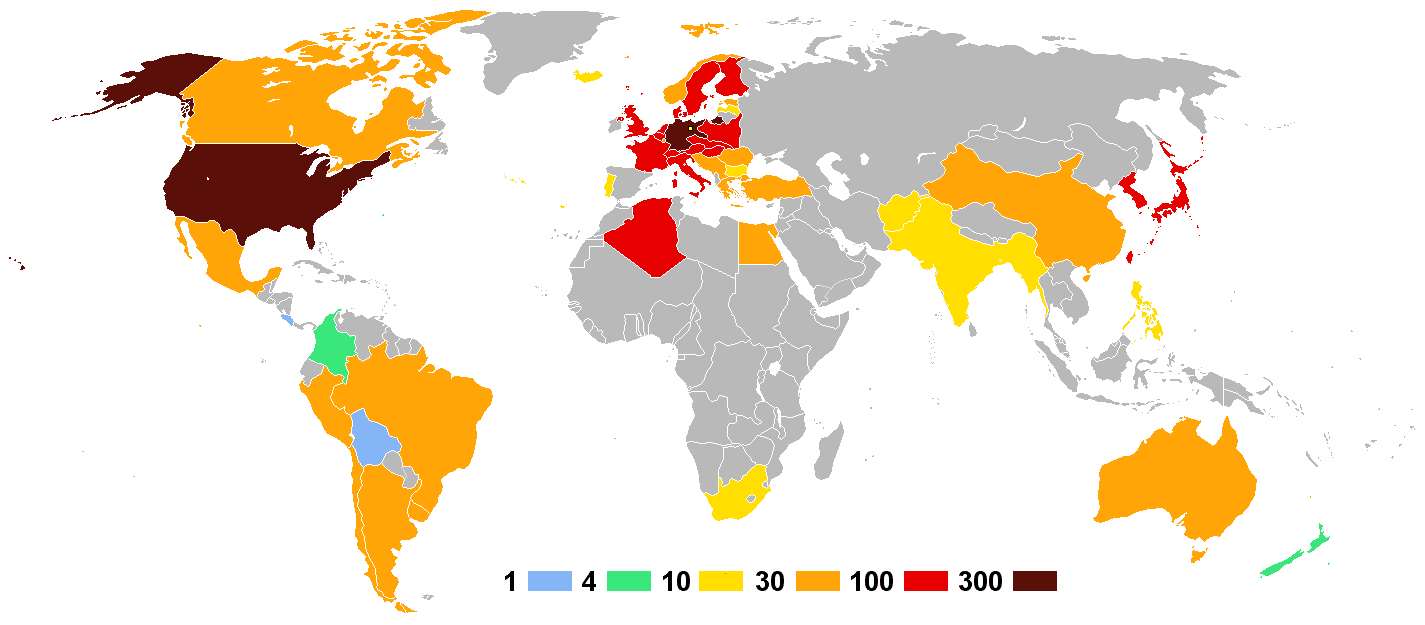
Number of athletes from each participating nation. These per-nation totals are approximate: sources differ on how 1936 competitors are counted—chiefly over whether the art competitions and demonstration events are included—so no single figure is definitive. The IOC records 3,963 athletes in the sporting events, while Olympedia counts 4,483 across all 31 medal disciplines and gives a full nation-by-nation breakdown.

Forty-nine nations competed, up from 37 in 1932. Five made their first Olympic appearance: Afghanistan, Bermuda, Bolivia, Costa Rica and Liechtenstein. Several nations returned after missing 1932, while Ireland and Spain competed in 1932 but were absent from Berlin. Sources give the number of participants differently, largely because of how the art competitions are counted. The International Olympic Committee gives the figure of 3,963 athletes—3,632 men and 331 women—in the sporting events. The 1936 programme, however, also awarded medals in five art categories (architecture, literature, music, painting and sculpture) and in alpinism and aeronautics; counting the architects, writers, composers, painters and sculptors who entered the art competitions, the database Olympedia records 4,483 participants across all 31 medal disciplines.

Participating National Olympic Committees
- Afghanistan (19)
- Argentina (51)
- Australia (32)
- Austria (234)
- Belgium (150)
- Bermuda (5)
- Bolivia (1)
- Brazil (73)
- Bulgaria (26)
- Canada (97)
- Chile (40)
- Republic of China (54)
- Colombia (5)
- Costa Rica (1)
- Czechoslovakia (190)
- Denmark (121)
- Egypt (53)
- Estonia (37)
- Finland (108)
- France (201)
- Germany (433) (host)
- Great Britain (208)
- Greece (41)
- Hungary (216)
- Iceland (12)
- India (27)
- Italy (244)
- Japan (179)
- Latvia (24)
- Liechtenstein (6)
- Luxembourg (49)
- Malta (11)
- Mexico (32)
- Monaco (8)
- Netherlands (165)
- New Zealand (7)
- Norway (70)
- Peru (40)
- Philippines (31)
- Poland (144)
- Portugal (19)
- Romania (54)
- South Africa (32)
- Sweden (171)
- Switzerland (190)
- Turkey (48)
- United States (359)
- Uruguay (37)
- Yugoslavia (93)

== Medal table ==
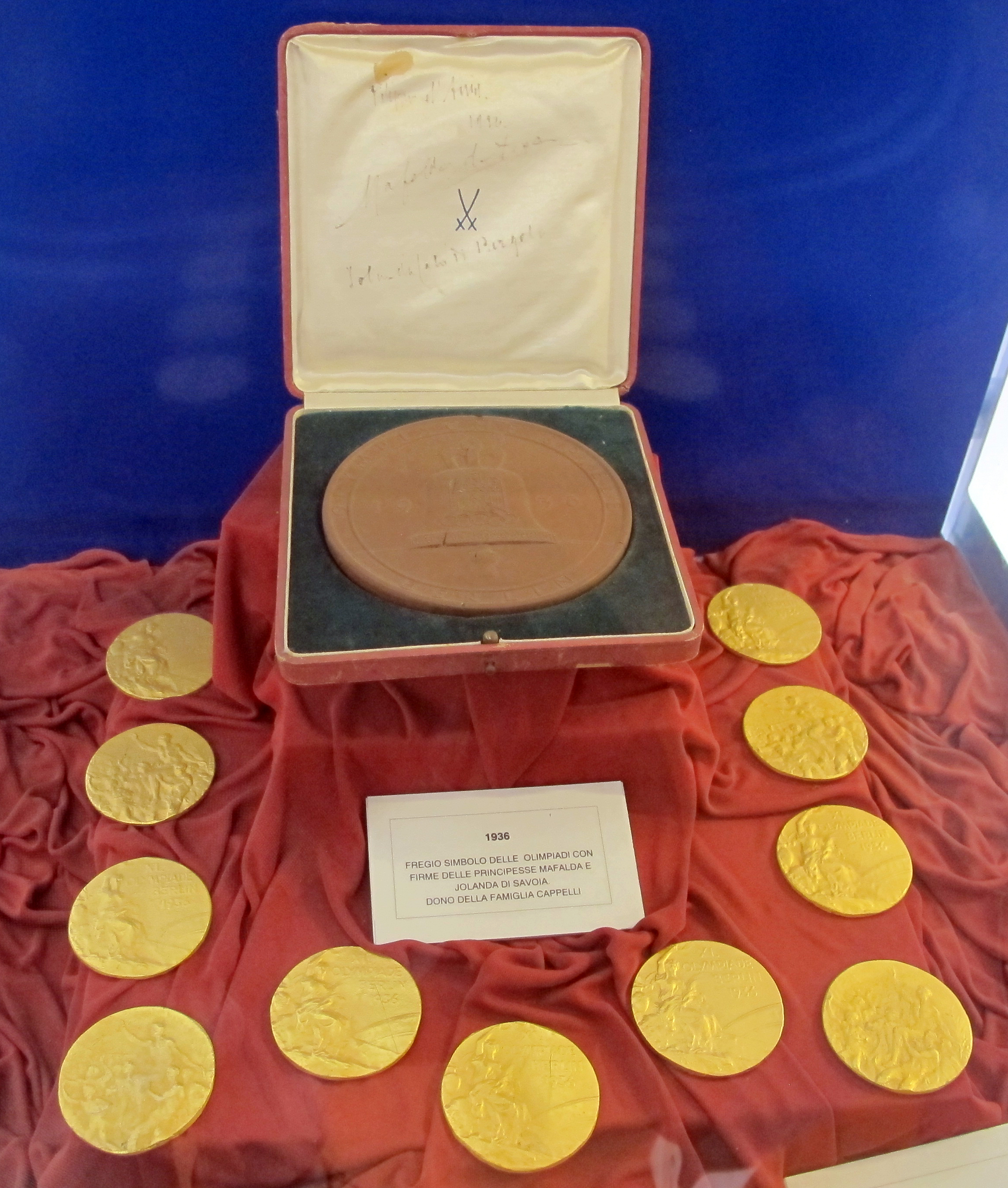
Victory medals and a commemorative frieze from the 1936 Games

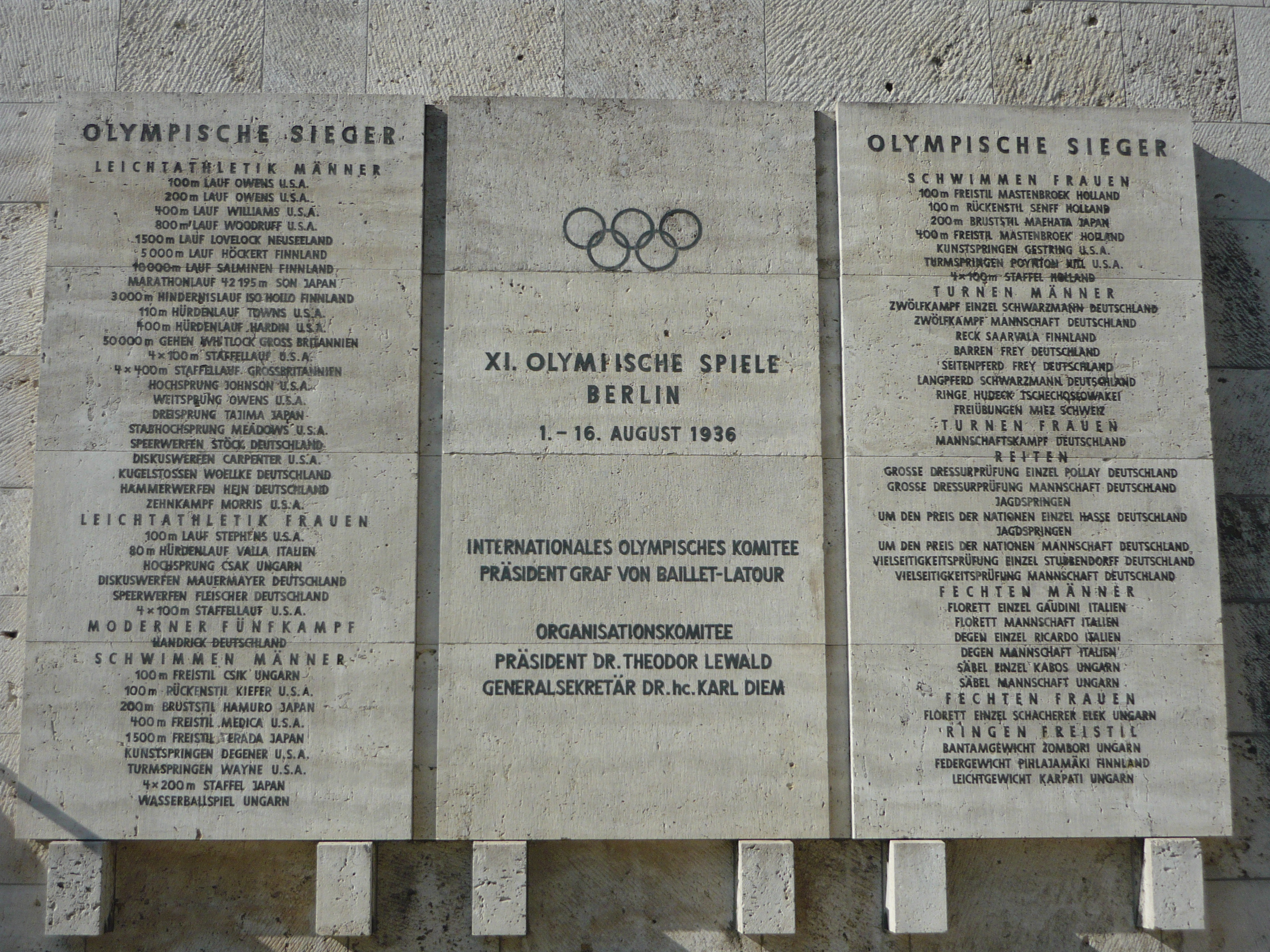
Results by nation (1 of 2)

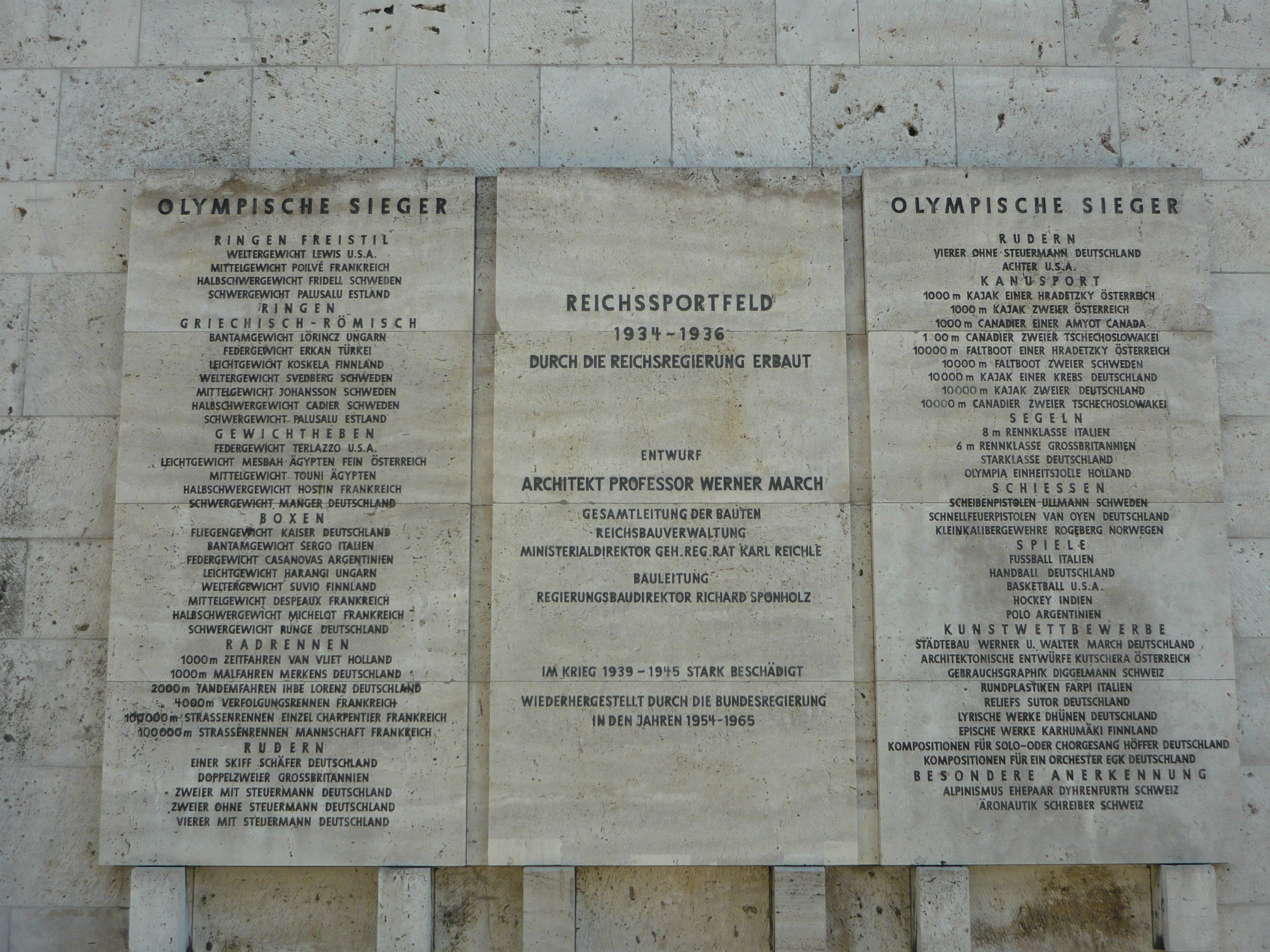
Results by nation (2 of 2)

The twelve nations that won the most medals at the 1936 Games.

* Host nation (Germany)

1936 Summer Olympics medal table
Rank	NOC	Gold	Silver	Bronze	Total
1	Germany*	38	31	32	101
2	United States	24	21	12	57
3	Hungary	10	1	5	16
4	Italy	9	13	5	27
5	Finland	8	6	6	20
6	France	7	6	6	19
7	Sweden	6	5	10	21
8	Japan	6	4	10	20
9	Netherlands	6	4	7	17
10	Austria	5	7	5	17
11	Switzerland	4	9	5	18
12	Great Britain	4	7	3	14
13–32	Remaining	14	26	35	75
Totals (32 entries)		141	140	141	422

=== Art competitions ===
As at every Games from 1912 to 1948, medals were also awarded in art competitions for works inspired by sport. The 1936 edition was the largest the Olympics ever staged, with fifteen events across five categories—architecture, literature, music, painting and sculpture—and the entries were shown in an exhibition on the Kaiserdamm that drew some 70,000 visitors. A novelty that year was that the prize-winning musical works were performed: the German composer Werner Egk took the orchestral gold for his Olympic Festive Music. Other golds went to the architect Werner March and his brother Walter for their design of the Reichssportfeld, to the Finnish writer Urho Karhumäki for the novel Avoveteen, to the Swiss graphic artist Alex Diggelmann for a sports poster, and to the Italian sculptor Farpi Vignoli for The Sulky Driver. With many French and British artists staying away, German entrants dominated, winning twelve of the thirty-two medals and five of the nine golds; the judges withheld medals entirely in three events. The art competitions were dropped after 1948; the IOC's currently recognizes them as official and its database give Germany a combined total of 101 medals for the 1936 Games, which includes 12 medals won in art competitions.

== Boycott debate ==
Prior to and during the Games, there was considerable debate outside Germany over whether the competition should be allowed or discontinued. A number of campaigns to boycott or relocate the Games emerged in the United Kingdom, France, Sweden, Czechoslovakia, the Netherlands, and the United States. The most consequential debate took place in the United States.

The protests were ultimately unsuccessful; forty-nine teams from around the world participated in the 1936 Games, the largest number of participating nations of any Olympics to that point.

=== United States ===
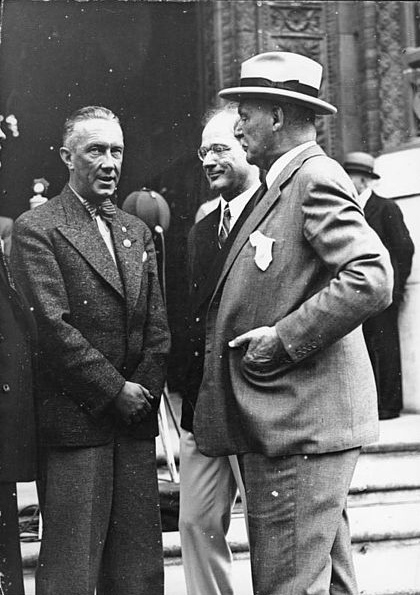
Avery Brundage meeting the mayor of Berlin Julius Lippert and IOC Secretary Theodor Lewald in 1936

Traditionally, the US sent one of the largest teams to the Olympics, and there was a considerable debate over whether the nation should participate in the 1936 Games. Americans Milton Green and Norman Cahners refused to attend, and American Jewish organizations, such as the American Jewish Congress and the Jewish Labor Committee, supported a boycott. Judge Jeremiah T. Mahoney, president of the Amateur Athletic Union (AAU), contested that racial discrimination was a violation of Olympic rules and that participation in the Games was amount to an indirect endorsement of the Third Reich. Avery Brundage, then of the American Olympic Committee, opposed the boycott, maintaining that politics had no place in sport and that the Olympic movement would be undermined if nations restricted participation by race or creed. Brundage would be later accused of being a Soviet sympathizer for his controversial stance on the Soviet sports system that allowed them to circumvent the amateur rules.

Most African-American newspapers supported participation in the Olympics. The Philadelphia Tribune and the Chicago Defender both agreed that black victories would undermine Nazi views of Aryan supremacy and spark renewed African-American pride. Eventually, Brundage won the debate, convincing the Amateur Athletic Union to close a vote in favor of sending an American team to the Berlin Olympics. Mahoney's efforts to incite a boycott of the Olympic games in the United States failed, although some athletes like Harvard University track star Milton Green chose to sit at home. US President Franklin Roosevelt and his administration did not become involved in the debate, due to a tradition of allowing the Olympic Committee to operate independently of government influence. Several American diplomats including William E. Dodd, the American ambassador to Berlin, and George Messersmith, head of the US legation in Vienna, opposed the decision to participate in the games. The Jewish Labour Committee staged a "World Labour Athletic Carnival" in New York during as an alternative sporting event.

=== Spain ===
The Spanish government led by the newly elected left-wing Popular Front boycotted the Games and the Government of Catalonia organized the People's Olympiad as a parallel event in Barcelona. Some 6,000 athletes from 49 countries registered. However, the People's Olympiad was aborted because of the outbreak of the Spanish Civil War just one day before the event was due to start.

=== Soviet Union ===
The Soviet Union had not participated in international sporting events since the 1920 Summer Olympics. The Soviet government was not invited to the 1920 Games, with the Russian Civil War still raging, and they did not participate in the 1924 Summer Olympics and forward on ideological grounds. Instead, through the auspices of the Red Sport International, it had participated in a left-wing workers' alternative, the Spartakiad, since 1928. The USSR had intended to attend the People's Olympiad in Barcelona until it was cancelled; the Soviets did attend the Spartakiad-sponsored 1937 Workers' Summer Olympiad in Antwerp, Belgium. The Soviet Union started competing in the Olympics in 1952, when Joseph Stalin realized that they could use the event to fulfil their political and ideological agenda.

=== Other countries ===
In France, the Jewish fencer Albert Wolff qualified for the national team but withdrew on principle. The Maccabi World Union declined an invitation on behalf of Mandatory Palestine, and two Turkish fencers, Halet Çambel and Suat Fetgeri Aşani—among the first Muslim women to compete at the Olympics—reportedly refused an introduction to Hitler.

== Legacy and aftermath ==
Historians widely regard the Berlin Games as a major propaganda success for the Nazi regime, though they differ over how far that success reached. The US Holocaust Memorial Museum describes them as "a resounding propaganda success" that projected an image of a peaceful, tolerant Germany, and notes that the forty-nine nations who took part lent the regime legitimacy in the eyes of both foreign and domestic audiences. Most contemporary press coverage was favourable; US newspapers echoed a New York Times report that the Games had put Germany "back in the fold of nations". Astute diplomats and correspondents stationed in Germany were less easily fooled, but many ordinary visitors and much of the foreign media came away impressed.

=== Assessment as propaganda ===
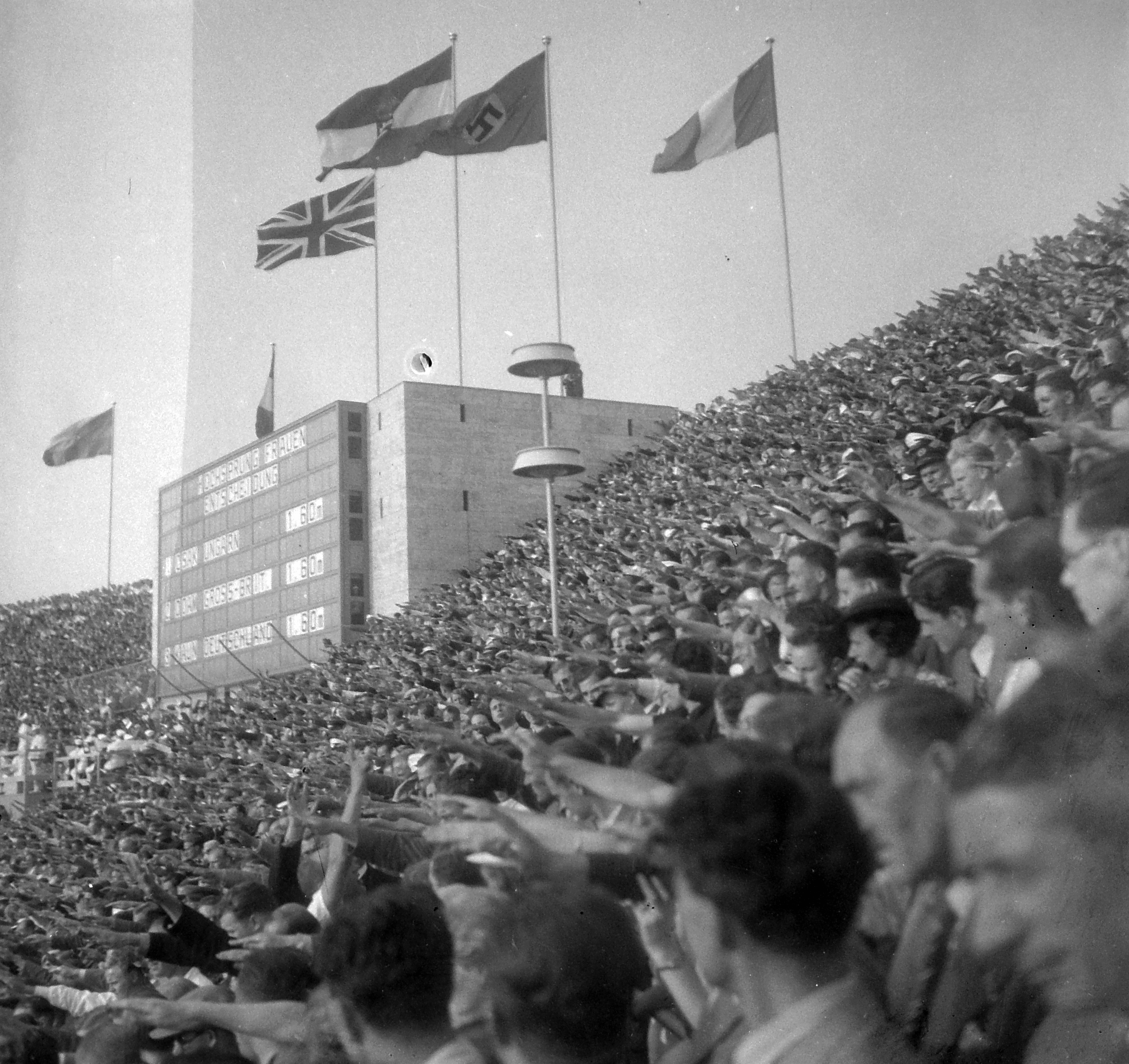
Spectators giving the Nazi salute during a medal ceremony

The scale of that success is debated. Richard D. Mandell, in the first major English-language study, The Nazi Olympics (1971), argued that the regime's unprecedented mass pageantry overwhelmed the critical judgement of visiting journalists, businessmen and diplomats. David Clay Large likewise counts the Games among the regime's greatest propaganda achievements, but draws a distinction: their effect on Germany's international standing was limited, whereas at home they helped the still-insecure Hitler consolidate his power—in Large's view the most important consequence of the Games. Other historians stress that the result turned on the failure of the boycott movement and on the willingness of officials to accept the regime's assurances, rather than on propaganda alone.

Owens's four gold medals became the most enduring popular memory of the Games and were widely seen as a rebuke to Nazi racial theory, though Germany still finished well clear at the top of the medal table. The persistent story that Hitler publicly snubbed Owens is not supported by the evidence: on the first day Hitler congratulated several German and Finnish victors but left the stadium before the African-American high jumper Cornelius Johnson received his gold, after which IOC president Henri de Baillet-Latour told him to greet all medalists or none; Hitler thereafter received none publicly, and Owens, who won the first of his titles the following day, was never in line to be greeted. Owens said he had been treated cordially in Germany and reserved his bitterness for the segregation he faced on returning home, noting that President Franklin D. Roosevelt neither received nor congratulated him.

=== Aftermath ===
The image of a tolerant Germany did not outlast the Games. Once the foreign visitors had left, anti-Jewish measures resumed and persecution intensified, leading to the Kristallnacht pogrom of November 1938 and, in September 1939, the outbreak of the Second World War. Several 1936 Olympians were later murdered in the Holocaust, among them the Polish competitors Roman Kantor and Ilia Szrajbman, both killed at Majdanek. The war forced the cancellation of the 1940 and 1944 Games, and the Olympics did not resume until London 1948.

=== Cultural legacy ===
The Games left a lasting cultural and sporting imprint. Leni Riefenstahl's film Olympia (1938) is regarded both as a landmark in cinema—for innovations such as underwater and slow-motion photography that influenced later sports filmmaking—and as a work of state propaganda. The torch relay and the live television coverage introduced in Berlin became permanent features of the modern Games, and the Olympic Stadium survived the war to be renovated for the 2006 FIFA World Cup final. Owens's story has since been dramatised on film, including in Race (2016). The Berlin Games are now widely cited as the archetypal example of "sportswashing"—the use of a prestigious sporting event to improve the image of an authoritarian government—and as a precedent in debates over later host selections.

== See also ==
- 1936 Winter Olympics
- People's Olympiad
