= Locke Brass Consort =

United Kingdom musical ensemble

The Locke Brass Consort is a musical ensemble of brass instruments based in the United Kingdom. It was founded by Leslie Lake in 1966, as a quintet, to give concerts in schools and music clubs.

Since 1975, in collaboration with conductor James Stobart, the Consort pursued a parallel career as a greatly enlarged symphonic brass and percussion ensemble. With this format it performed regularly at the South Bank Centre in London during the 1980s, commissioned several works, broadcast for the BBC and Capital Radio, and made several recordings to critical acclaim, including two for American and Belgian companies.

Its most ambitious project was to record the complete works for brass of Richard Strauss (which included the world premiere recording of the Festmusik der Stadt Wien of 1943).

In early 2014, following Leslie Lake’s retirement from the orchestra of the English National Opera, the group was reformed, with Leslie as Musical Director and Conductor. The aim of the ensemble to recreate the symphonic brass sound of the original ensemble and others that were predominant in the 1980s.

== Discography ==
- Fanfare: British Music for Symphonic Brass Ensemble (1977)
- Richard Strauss: Music for Symphonic Brass (1988)
- Contrasts in Brass
- Jubilant Brass (1980)
- Symphonic Marches for Concert Brass
