= 1745 in music =

== Events ==
- April 16 Johann Sebastian Bach revives the anonymous St Luke Passion BWV 246 (BC D 6a) with an additional chorale by Bach himself at St. Nicholas Church, Leipzig.
- Thomas Arne enlarges the orchestra at Vauxhall Gardens, taking on John Hebden as principal cellist and bassoonist.
- Giovanni Battista Pescetti returns to Venice and becomes Second Organist at St Mark's Basilica.
- After 1745 Bach performs the Passion cantata pastiche Wer ist der, so von Edom kömmt (BC D 10).

== Classical music ==
- Carl Philipp Emanuel Bach
  - Menuet con 5 Variazioni, Wq, 118, H.44
  - Harpsichord Concerto in E minor, H.418
  - Harpsichord Concerto in D minor, H.420
  - Harpsichord Concerto in D major, H.421
  - Trio Sonata in C major, H.573
- Johann Sebastian Bach – Gloria in excelsis Deo, BWV 191
- Wilhelm Friedemann Bach – Keyboard Sonata in D major, F.3
- Johann Ernst Eberlin – 9 Toccatas and Fugues (for organ), published in Augsburg, 1747, as IX toccate e fughe
- George Frideric Handel – Hercules, HWV 60 (oratorio)
- Johann Melchior Molter – Clarinet Concerto in G major, MWV 6.40
- Johann Joachim Quantz – Flute Concerto in G major, QV 5:174
- John Stanley – 10 Voluntaries (for organ), published in 1748 as Op. 5
- Georg Philipp Telemann – Johannes Passion, TWV 5:30
- Tomaso Antonio Vitali – Chaconne in G minor

== Opera ==
- Ferdinando Bertoni – La vedova accorta
- François Francœur and François Rebel
  - Le Trophée
  - Zélindor, roi des Sylphes
- George Frideric Handel – Comus (based on the masque by John Milton)
- Gennaro Manna – Lucio Vero
- Jean-Philippe Rameau
  - Les Fêtes de Polymnie, RCT 39
  - Platée, RCT 53
- Jean-Jacques Rousseau – Les Muses galantes
- Georg Christoph Wagenseil – Ariodante

== Popular music ==
- Stand Round my Brave Boys by George Frideric Handel

== Publications ==
- Louis-Antoine Dornel – Le tour du clavier sur tous les tons
- John Stanley – Six Solo's [sic] for flute or violin and harpsichord, Op. 4 (London)
- Giuseppe Tartini – 12 Violin Sonatas, Op. 2 (Rome: Antonius Cleton)

== Methods and theory writings ==
- Bartolomé Ferriol – Reglas utiles para los aficionados a danzar
- Georg Andreas Sorge – Vorgemach der musicalischen Composition

== Births ==
- January 17 – Nicolas Roze, music collector and composer (died 1819)
- January 18 – Caterino Mazzolà, librettist and poet (died 1806)
- February – Johann Peter Salomon, violinist, conductor and composer (died 1815)
- March 4 – Charles Dibdin, British composer (died 1814)
- April 7 – Jiří Družecký, Czech composer (died 1819)
- May 7 – Carl Stamitz, composer (died 1801)
- July 15 – Friedrich Wilhelm Heinrich Benda, composer and musician (died 1814)
- August 18 – Johann Ignaz Ludwig Fischer, operatic bass (died 1825)
- November 9 – Johann Michael Bach, musician and theorist (died 1820)
- December 9 – Maddalena Laura Sirmen, violinist, singer and composer (died 1818)
- December 25 – Chevalier de Saint-Georges, the "Black Mozart" (died 1799)
- date unknown – Sophia Baddeley, actress and singer (died 1786)

== Deaths ==
- January – Giovanni Lorenzo Gregori, collector and composer (born 1663)
- February 18 – Nicola Fago, composer and music teacher (born 1677)
- March 15 – Michel de la Barre, flautist and composer (born c.1675)
- April 18 – Francesco Venturini, composer and musician (born 1675)
- April 27 – Jean-Baptiste Morin, composer (born 1677)
- May 9 – Tomaso Antonio Vitali, violinist and composer (born 1663)
- June 25 – Johann Wilhelm Drese, composer (born 1677)
- June 28 – Antoine Forqueray, viola da gamba player and composer (born 1672)
- September 5 – Simon-Joseph Pellegrin, librettist and poet (born 1663)
- October 18 – Jacques Autreau, librettist and painter (born 1657)
- October 19 – Jonathan Swift, librettist and satirist (born 1667)
- October 24 – Antonio Veracini, violinist and composer (born 1659)
- November 5 – Françoise-Charlotte de Senneterre Ménétou, French composer (born 1679)
- December 6 – Christoph Förster, German composer (born 1693)
- December 23 – Jan Dismas Zelenka, composer (born 1679)
- date unknown – Charles Coffey, dramatist and composer
