= Pierre D'Archambeau =

American violinist (1927–2014)

- Born: Pierre D'Archambeau; April 3, 1927; Yverdon, Switzerland
- Died: June 16, 2014 (aged 87) Osterville, Massachusetts, USA
- Genres: Classical
- Occupations: Violinist, pedagogue
- Instrument: Violin
- Years active: 1936-2014

Pierre D'Archambeau (3 April 1927 in Yverdon – 16 June 2014 in Osterville) born from Belgian parents, was an American violin virtuoso and pedagogue

== Life ==
D'Archambeau came from a long line of musicians. His father, Iwan (Ywan) D'Archambeau (Herve, Belgium, 1879 - Villefranche-sur-Mer, France, 29 December 1955), was the cellist of the Flonzaley Quartet, which enjoyed an international reputation for more than twenty-five years during the 1920s and 30s.

Pierre D'Archambeau started piano lessons when he was four years old and three years later, he started violin. When he was only nine years old, he gave his first violin recital in the United States. He won many prizes, amount them the International Competition of Geneva, the Queen Elisabeth of Belgium Competition and the Medal of the Eugene Ysaÿe Foundation.

D'Archambeau worked with many noted musicians, including Arturo Toscanini, Pablo Casals, Jacques Thibaud, Nadia Boulanger and Fritz Kreisler, who bequeathed him the famous Daniel Parker "the Kreisler", London, c. 1715, violin. This violin, which he played regularly, was one of the best specimens of the work of this famous English violin maker.

D’Archambeau was presented in the US regularly by W. Hazaiah Williams, the founder and director of "Today’s Artists Concerts/Four Seasons Arts", beginning in 1980 and again in 1986 with a San Francisco recital for unaccompanied violin. Under the same presenter, he appeared in 1992 with violinist Elwyn Adams and pianist Leon Bates in Weill Recital Hall at Carnegie Hall, New York. He later performed again in Weill Hall with violist Amadi Azikiwe and pianist Dennis Helmrich. From 1985 through 2012, Mr. D’Archambeau was artist-in-residence at "Four Seasons Arts’ Yachats Music Festival" on the Oregon coast. In that role, he not only performed, but was mentor to the many young musicians who had the privilege of sharing the stage with him.

Pierre D'Archambeau's solo recitals have included the six Ysaÿe Sonatas, the twenty-four Caprices of Paganini and the six Sonatas & Partitas of Bach. His repertoire was huge, embracing more than fifty concerti.

D'Archambeau died on June 16, 2014, at his home in Massachusetts, aged 87.

== Selected discography ==
- F.Geminiani, Violin Sonata in B flat major / P.Rode, 24 Caprices en formes d'etudes: No.17 in A flat major / F.Prume, 6 Grandes Etudes, Op.2: No.6 'Le petit Savoyard' / E.Moor, 4 Preludes, Op.100 (Pierre d'Archambeau, violin - 2LP Orion)
- G.Lekeu, Violin Sonata in G major / J.Turina, Violin Sonata No.2, Op.82, "Sonata espanola" / E.Elgar, Violin Sonata in E minor, Op.82 / A.Huybrechts, Violin Sonata (Pierre d'Archambeau, violin; Donna Turner Smith, piano - 2LP Orion)
- A.Pochon, Chaconne d'après Haendel / J.Jongen, Sonate-Duo, Op.109 / Z.Kodály, Duo for Violin and Cello, Op.7: II. Adagio / B.Martinů, Duo No.1 for Violin and Cello, H.157 (Pierre d'Archambeau, violin; Iwan d'Archambeau, cello - LP Orion)
- T.A.Vitali, Ciaccona (Chaconne), in G minor / E.Chausson, Poème, Op.25 (arrangement by E.Ysaÿe, for violin, piano and organ) / J.Rheinberger, Suite for Violin and Organ, Op.166 (Pierre d'Archambeau, violin; Marilyn Mason, organ; Michele Johns, piano - LP Orion)
- G.F.Haendel, 6 Sonatas for Violin and Harpsichord ("Duo Sonoro": Pierre d'Archambeau, violin; Marilyn Mason, harpsichord - LP Musical Heritage Society, MHS 4492 - 1981)
