= Mercantile Bank Building =

Mercantile Bank Building or Mercantile National Bank Building may refer to:

- Mercantile Bank Building (Jonesboro, Arkansas), listed on the NRHP in Craighead County, Arkansas
- Mercantile National Bank Building (Dallas, Texas), also known as Mercantile Bank Building
- Mercantile Bank building (Tampa, Florida), a historic bank building set to be remodeled for use as a hotel
