= Chaconne in G minor =

Composition attributed to Tomaso Antonio Vitali

- attributed to Tomaso Antonio Vitali
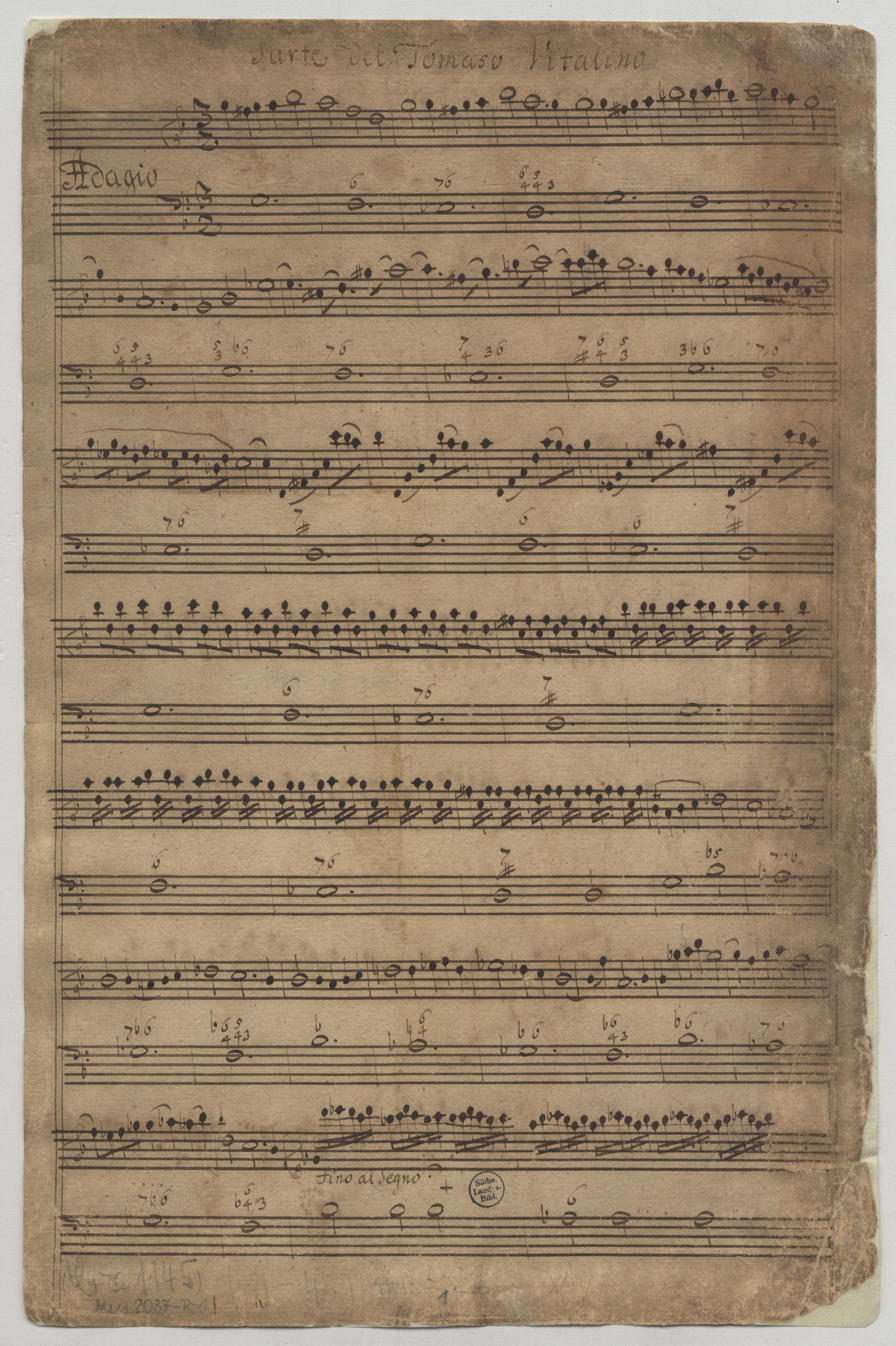
- First page of the Dresden manuscript
- Key: G minor
- Published: 1867 by Ferdinand David
- Scoring: Violin and continuo

The Chaconne in G minor is a Baroque composition for violin and continuo, attributed to the Italian composer Tomaso Antonio Vitali. A Dresden manuscript that may have been transcribed in the early 18th century is the earliest known version of the chaconne, but it was not published until 1867 when Ferdinand David arranged it for violin and piano. The origin of its composition has been debated, with some musicologists hypothesizing that the work is a musical hoax composed by David rather than Vitali. Léopold Charlier made significant alterations to the chaconne in the early 20th century, transforming it into a virtuosic, Romantic-style showpiece. It has been arranged by numerous other composers, including Hans Werner Henze, who used it as the basis for his work Il Vitalino raddoppiato (1977).

Differing somewhat from the major archetypes of ground bass variations, the chaconne features a descending tetrachord in the continuo part, the lowest voice (this bass-line pattern is traditionally associated with lament and figured, at a time, more prominently in the passacaglia), above which the violin part presents increasingly complex variations on the original theme. There are several abrupt changes in the key between variations, atypical of other chaconnes from the Baroque era. Some suggest that this characteristic, along with the observation that the chaconne is dissimilar to Vitali's other surviving compositions, is indicative of a different composer. Jascha Heifetz began his American debut recital at Carnegie Hall in 1917 with the chaconne and regularly performed it as part of his concert repertoire for the next four decades.

== Background ==
The earliest known version of the chaconne is a manuscript that may have been transcribed in the early 18th century. Various sources have identified the manuscript's copyist as Johann Jacob Lindner or Johann Gottfried Grundig, both of whom worked at the Dresden court. The manuscript is located at the Saxon State and University Library Dresden.

=== Composition and publication ===
The words "Parte del Tomaso Vitalino" are written on the first page of the Dresden manuscript. There is no known musician named Tomaso Vitalino; instead, the name is thought to refer to Tomaso Antonio Vitali (1663–1745), a Baroque composer and violinist from Modena, Italy. He was the son of the composer Giovanni Battista Vitali and is otherwise known for writing trio sonatas and other chamber music. "Vitalino", containing the diminutive suffix "-ino", may have been an additional reference to the younger Vitali instead of his father. Print editions of the chaconne have designated Vitali as the composer, and it is best known of the works attributed to him.

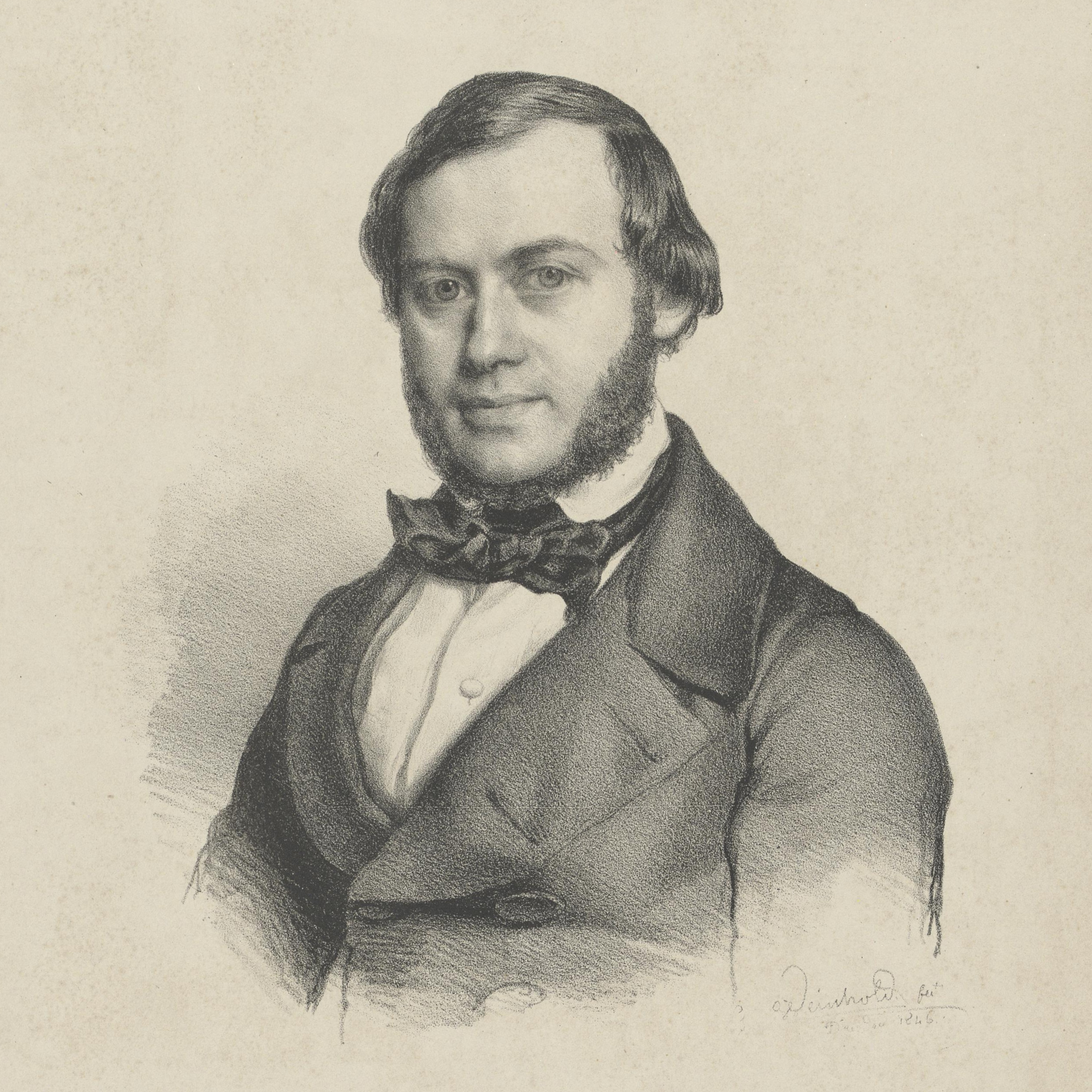
1846 portrait of Ferdinand David by Johann Georg Weinhold

The chaconne was first published in 1867 by the German musician Ferdinand David in the second volume of his Die hohe Schule des Violinspiels, a collection of 18th-century compositions for violin. David gave the composition its "Chaconne" title and substituted the continuo accompaniment with a piano part. He also embellished the violin part with advanced techniques, adding octaves, double stops, and more dramatic changes in dynamics. Other edited versions of the Dresden manuscript were published by Bärenreiter in 1966 and Casa Ricordi in 1978.

Music scholars have debated the origins of the chaconne's composition. In 1964, the German musicologist Hermann Keller published an analysis in Neue Zeitschrift für Musik casting doubt on the idea that Vitali was the composer. He wrote that he had consulted with John G. Suess, who authored Vitali's entry in Die Musik in Geschichte und Gegenwart; they hypothesized that the chaconne was a musical hoax composed by David, comparing it to similar hoaxes by Fritz Kreisler. Keller suggested that David modeled the composition after the chaconne in Johann Sebastian Bach's famous Partita in D minor for violin. Others have questioned its composition due to its numerous modulations, uncharacteristic of other Baroque pieces, as well as the dissimilarity between the chaconne and other works known to have been composed by Vitali. Wolfgang Reich, writing for Die Musikforschung, proposed changing the piece's nickname from the "Vitali Chaconne" to the "Dresden Chaconne". However, Marc Pincherle argued that the Dresden manuscript was convincing evidence that the chaconne was composed in the mid-18th century and not by David.

=== Other arrangements ===
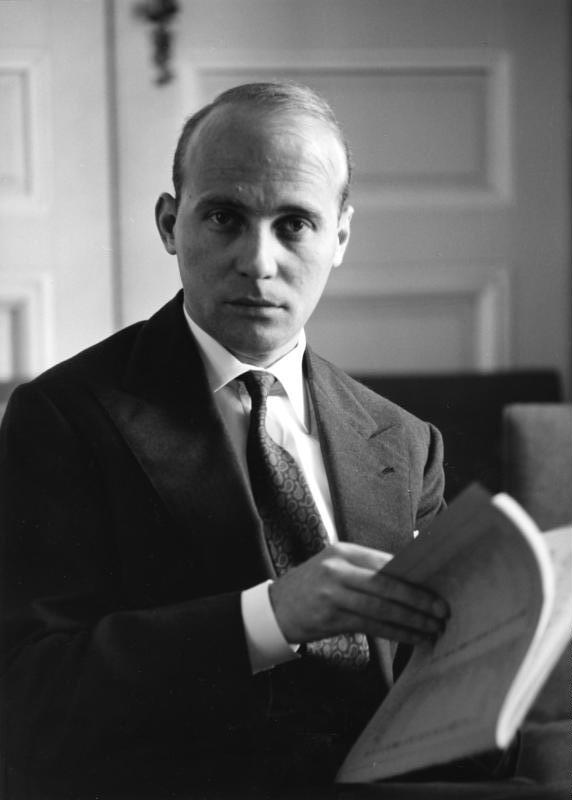
Hans Werner Henze, the composer of Il Vitalino raddoppiato

The Belgian violinist and music teacher Léopold Charlier wrote an arrangement of the chaconne for violin and piano that was published by Breitkopf & Härtel in 1911. He made significant edits to the piece, including rearranging the variations, removing some of them, and adding even more embellishments to the violin part. Charlier's arrangement has been characterised as a Romantic version of the chaconne, with Robert Maxham of Fanfare describing it as "a highly personal Romantic arrangement" and Paul Hume calling it "one of music's famous cases of lily-gilding". It is the version most commonly performed in concert and most editions of the chaconne that have been published since, including ones by Leopold Auer, Zino Francescatti and Ottorino Respighi, are based on Charlier's arrangement.

Il Vitalino raddoppiato is a work for violin and chamber orchestra, written by the German composer Hans Werner Henze and published in 1977. It is an expansion on the chaconne, presented as a theme and variations, and has been characterised as a "chaconne on a chaconne". While Il Vitalino raddoppiato begins in a similar style to the original chaconne, it incorporates more modern and experimental sounds in the last third of the piece, including deconstructed harmonies and a "hallucinatory cadenza". It received praise from music critics for its style and interpretation of the chaconne; Samuel Lipman presented it as a "serious and even profound" example of the deconstruction of a classical composition, and Andrew Clements of The Guardian described it as "[s]ometimes acerbic, sometimes achingly beautiful". However, John von Rhein, in a review for the Chicago Tribune, wrote that the composition's half-hour duration "seemed excessive".

In 1899, Breitkopf & Härtel published a version of David's edition for viola and piano, arranged by Friedrich Hermann. The Italian-American cellist Luigi Silva later arranged the chaconne for cello and piano. His performance of the arrangement at a 1959 recital was praised by The New York Times as having "added dignity to the old showpiece".

== Music ==
A chaconne is characterised by a set of variations on a repeated harmonic progression, typically in a minor key and triple metre. Like many early Baroque chaconnes, the Chaconne in G minor features a descending tetrachord, beginning with a four-note segment of the G minor scale. This bass line is repeated over fifty times while the violin part goes into increasingly complicated variations on the original theme. Though the composition is in the key of G minor, the Dresden manuscript includes only one flat in the key signature, while the E♭ notes are manually indicated throughout, as was common in music manuscripts from the 18th century. The violin part changes keys suddenly between variations on several occasions, uncharacteristic of chaconnes from the Baroque era.

The chaconne form is closely related to the passacaglia, another musical form that was commonly employed during the Baroque era. A passacaglia also consists of a set of related variations, but with the variations sharing a recurring melody in the bass line, rather than a shared harmonic series for a chaconne. While the Chaconne in G minor received its "chaconne" label from its first publication in 1867, some musicologists have suggested that it would more accurately be described as a passacaglia, due to its repeated bass line.

== Notable performances ==
"At the first few bars of Vitali's 'Chaconne', with which the program began, the audience seemed to sense a rising star."

— Paul Morris, New York Herald, 28 October 1917

Charlier's arrangement of the chaconne was the first piece of Jascha Heifetz's 1917 American debut at Carnegie Hall, accompanied by Frank L. Sealey on the organ. His performance was praised by music critics: Pitts Sanborn wrote that Heifetz played the chaconne "grandly, nobly", and Paul Morris of the New York Herald called it a "vital performance". Heifetz continued to perform the chaconne, along with other pieces from his debut, throughout his career. According to the musicologist Dario Sarlo, he performed the chaconne 253 times between 1917 and 1956, after which he focused more on chamber music. In 1929, he opened 12 out of 29 recitals with the chaconne. In 1950, Heifetz recorded the Charlier–Auer edition with the organist Richard Ellsasser; the recording was described in Fanfare as "transcendental virtuosity and soaring nobility of style".

Other notable violinists who have recorded the chaconne are Zino Francescatti, Sarah Chang, Nathan Milstein, David Oistrakh, and Henryk Szeryng.

== See also ==
- List of 18th-century chaconnes
