= Sarah Chang =

Korean-American violinist (born 1980)

Sarah Chang 장영주
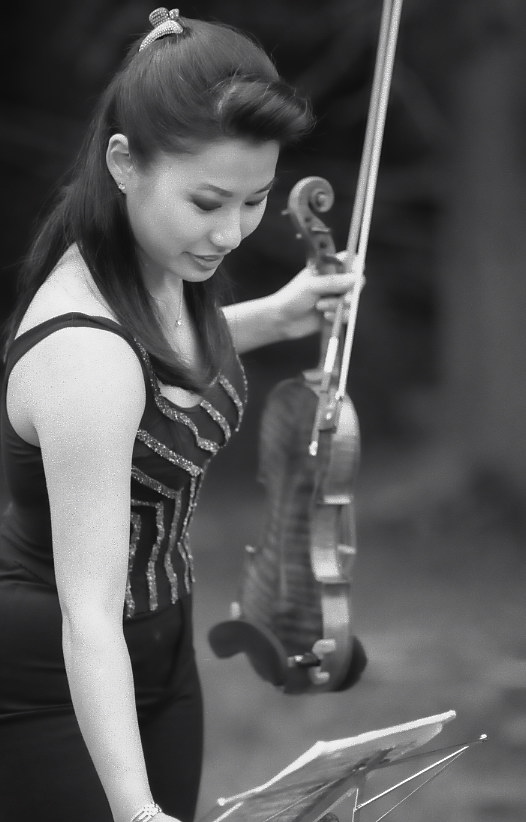
- Chang before performing a 2005 concert

Background information
- Born: Young Joo Chang; December 10, 1980 (age 45); Philadelphia, Pennsylvania, U.S.
- Genre: Classical
- Instrument: Violin
- Years active: 1984–present
- Labels: EMI Classics; IMG Artists

Korean name
- Hangul: 장영주
- Hanja: 張永宙
- RR: Jang Yeongju
- MR: Chang Yŏngju

Sarah Chang (Korean: 장영주; born Young Joo Chang; December 10, 1980) is a Korean American classical violinist. Recognized as a child prodigy, she first played as a soloist with the New York Philharmonic and the Philadelphia Orchestra in 1989. She enrolled at Juilliard School to study music, graduated in 1999. Especially during the 1990s and early to mid-2000s, Chang had major roles as a soloist with many of the world's major orchestras.

== Early life and education ==
Chang was born in Philadelphia, Pennsylvania, and raised in Cherry Hill and Voorhees Township, New Jersey. Her mother Myoung-Jun Chang is a composer and her father Min-Soo Chang was a violinist and music teacher. Chang's parents moved to the United States from South Korea in 1979 for her father's advanced music degree at Temple University. Her mother took composition classes at the University of Pennsylvania. Chang has said that although she "never actually lived in Korea... I do still feel very strongly it's where my roots are."

In 1986, when Chang was 5 years old, she auditioned for and was accepted to the Juilliard School by performing the Bruch Violin Concerto No. 1 in G minor. Chang spent her weekends attending music classes at Juilliard and shopping in New York City with her parents. When Chang was 6 years old, she started studying with Isaac Stern outside school. In 1989, she began working with Dorothy DeLay at her studio in New York where her father had received his musical lessons, and at the Aspen Music Festival and School. A former student and assistant to DeLay, Hyo Kang, also provided training to Chang.

Following her 1999 high school graduation in New Jersey, she returned to Juilliard for university and studied with DeLay.

Chang learned from a family environment to naturally speak Korean.

Due to her musical accomplishments, Chang is among a very small number of professional figures recognized as a child prodigy.

== Career ==
=== Early work ===
Her mother trained her to play one-finger melodies on the piano at age 3. For her fourth birthday, she was given a 1/16-sized violin. Upon hearing her play at a dinner party, Philadelphia Orchestra concertmaster Norman Carol asked music director Riccardo Muti to listen to her. At age 8, she auditioned alongside Muti and Zubin Mehta, who was the music director of the New York Philharmonic. Both granted her immediate engagements.

In 1991, when Chang was 10 years old, she recorded her first album, Debut; it was released by EMI Classics on August 18, 1992, and quickly reached the Billboard chart of classical best-sellers. Chang quickly rose to fame and became known on an international scale, performing up to 150 concerts a year. In 2006, Newsweek ranked her as one of the Top Eight Achieving Females in the United States. In the interview accompanying the feature, she said: "I think having a career at such an early age kept me focused. We schedule at least two to three years in advance in the classical industry. I felt so grounded and so grateful to already know what it was that I wanted to do with my life."

=== 2002–2005 ===
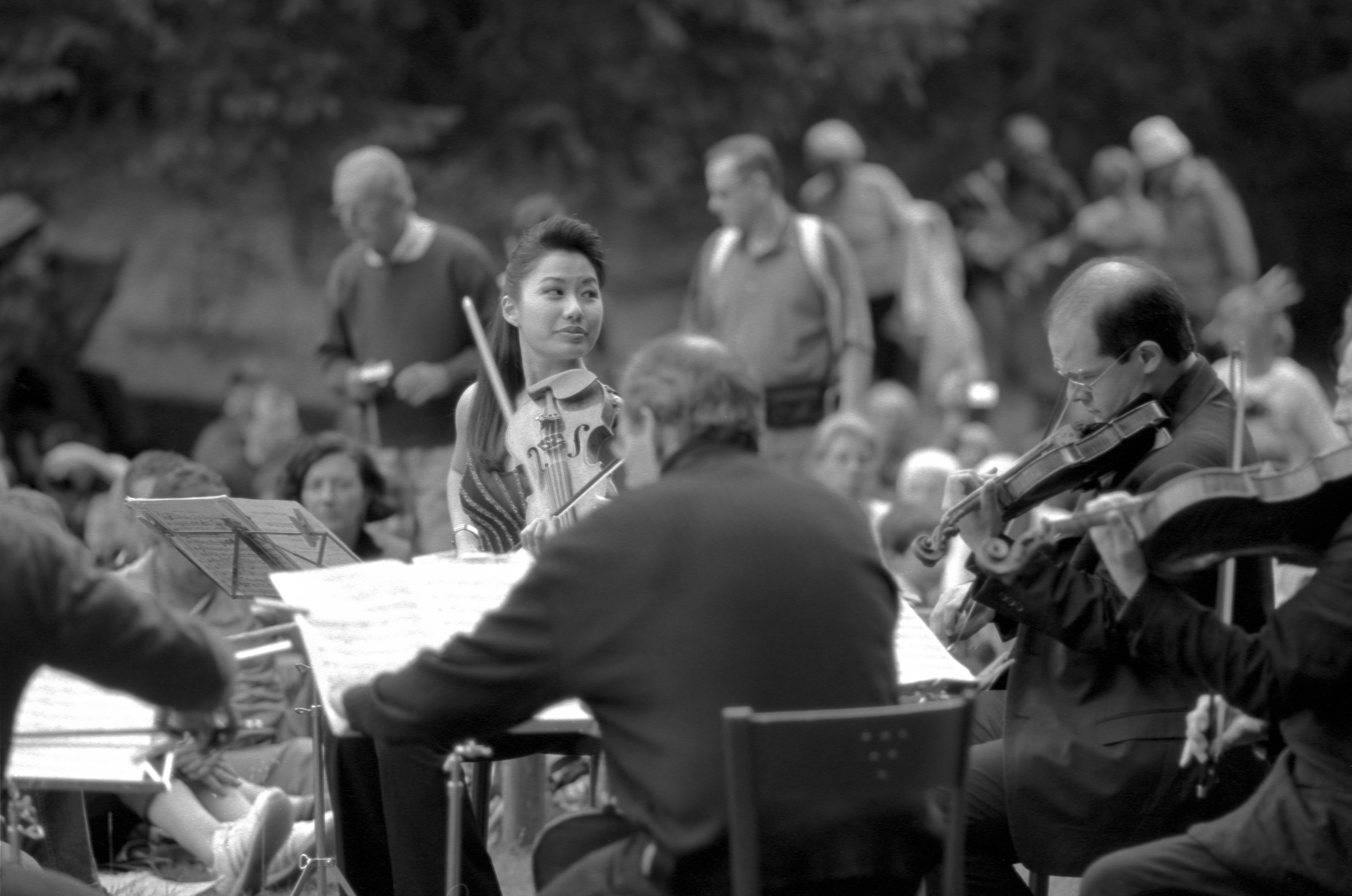
Chang in Italy at the 2005 Festival I suoni delle Dolomiti, performing outdoors

In 2002, Chang performed in Pyongyang, North Korea. She said: "The concert was full of government officials. Every single last seat. It was invitation only, but it was an unbelievable experience. Frightening and exhilarating at the same time. And I just thought about how lucky I am. I am so fortunate to be a musician, and at that moment, I genuinely felt that music is the one and only universal language."

Chang took part in watchmaker Movado's global advertising campaign "The Art of Time" with Pete Sampras and composer Wynton Marsalis. For the 2004 Olympics, she was selected to carry the Olympic torch in New York. In 2005, the Yale School of Music dedicated a chair in Sprague Hall in Chang's name. After that, Chang toured for a year with the Berlin Philharmonic and the Royal Concertgebouw Orchestra in a Sextet program of summer festivals leading to a concert at the Berlin Philharmonie.

=== 2007–present ===
Chang played a recital at Carnegie Hall on April 7, 2007, accompanied by the British pianist Ashley Wass. She continued to perform with the Los Angeles Philharmonic and Esa-Pekka Salonen and appear with the former at the Hollywood Bowl and Walt Disney Concert Hall throughout 2008. On March 27 and 28, 2008, she played for San Antonio, Texas audiences at the Majestic Theater, a performance preceded by an appearance (to meet and inspire young as well as seasoned musicians at no charge) at Antonio Strad Violin in the same city. From May 2009 to June 2010, she held recital tours across Europe, North America, and Asia with pianist Andrew von Oeyen; a July 2010 recording of the two was eventually released. On February 12, 2010, she gave a recital at the Barbican Hall in London. Chang made an appearance at the University of Southern California in March 2010, playing Max Bruch's Violin Concerto No. 1 in G minor, Op. 26. She performed at the Hollywood Bowl in August 2010.

== Instruments ==
Sarah Chang owns several violins. Her main instrument is the 1717 Guarneri del Gesu by the Cremonese luthier, Giuseppe Guarneri del Gesù which she purchased from her mentor, Isaac Stern.

Chang uses a variety of bows: she has said that she prefers a Pajeot for Mozart and Bach; a Sartory for the Tchaikovsky and Sibelius concerti; and two Dominique Peccattes for other music.

== Public image ==
Chang has performed with the New York Philharmonic, the Philadelphia Orchestra, the Chicago Symphony Orchestra, the Boston Symphony Orchestra, the Cleveland Orchestra, the Berlin Philharmonic, the Vienna Philharmonic, the London Symphony Orchestra, the London Philharmonic Orchestra, the Royal Concertgebouw Orchestra, the Los Angeles Philharmonic, the NHK Symphony Orchestra of Tokyo, the Hong Kong Philharmonic Orchestra and the National Symphony Orchestra of Washington, D.C., among others.

Chang has also been a soloist under the baton of conductors Steven Amundson, Daniel Barenboim, Sir Colin Davis, Plácido Domingo, Gustavo Dudamel, Charles Dutoit, JoAnn Falletta, Valery Gergiev, Bernard Haitink, Mariss Jansons, James Levine, David Lockington, Lorin Maazel, Cristian Măcelaru, Kurt Masur, Zubin Mehta, Riccardo Muti, André Previn, Sir Simon Rattle, Esa-Pekka Salonen, Wolfgang Sawallisch, Leonard Slatkin, Michael Tilson Thomas, Nayden Todorov, Bramwell Tovey, John Williams, Jaap van Zweden, David Zinman, and others.

Notable recital engagements have included her Carnegie Hall debut and performances at the Kennedy Center, Orchestra Hall, Symphony Hall, Barbican Centre, Philharmonie, and Concertgebouw.

As a chamber musician, Chang has collaborated with Pinchas Zukerman, Wolfgang Sawallisch, Vladimir Ashkenazy, Yefim Bronfman, Martha Argerich, Leif Ove Andsnes, Stephen Kovacevich, Yo-Yo Ma, Lynn Harrell, Lars Vogt, and the late Isaac Stern. She has made several chamber recordings with current and former members of the Berlin Philharmonic, including the Sextet and Piano Quintet of Dvořák and the Souvenir de Florence of Tchaikovsky.

In January 2011, Chang disclosed in an interview with Evan Solomon of Power & Politics (CBC) that President Obama had appointed her to the Presidential Commission on Russian Relations and that she was taking on a new role as State Department Special Cultural Envoy. She had already been promoting and supporting childhood musical education for many years. She has also been a cultural ambassador for the U.S.; for instance, she was invited to play in Pyongyang, North Korea, with a South Korean orchestra in 2002.

=== Awards ===
Chang has received a number of awards, including:

- 1992: Avery Fisher Career Grant
- 1993: Gramophone Magazine Young Artist of the Year (1993)
- 1993: Newcomer of the Year for "Echo" (Germany)
- 1993: Nan Pa (South Korea)
- 1994: Newcomer of the Year at the International Classical Music Awards
- 1999: Avery Fisher Prize (Note: Avery Fisher Prize rarely grants this distinction. Chang was one of three women to be selected for the award that year, along with Nadja Salerno-Sonnenberg and Pamela Frank. For more information, The New York Times.)
- 2004: Hollywood Bowl's Hall of Fame (Note: To date, Chang is the youngest person on record to receive this title; see this Los Angeles Times article.)
- 2005: Premio Internazionale Accademia Musicale Chigiana in Siena, Italy

== Discography ==
=== CDs ===
- 1992: Debut includes Pablo de Sarasate, Edward Elgar, Nicolo Paganini (EMI Classics)
- 1992: Concert for Planet Earth, Live Recording/Placido Domingo/Sarah Chang/Wynton Marsalis (Sony Music)
- 1993: Pyotr Ilyich Tchaikovsky: Violin Concerto Op 35. Conductor: Sir Colin Davis / Johannes Brahms: Hungarian Dances 1, 2, 4, 7 (EMI Classics)
- 1994: Nicolo Paganini: Concerto No. 1 in D for Violin and Orchestra, Op. 6 / Camille Saint-Saëns: Havanaise for Violin and Orchestra, Op.83, Introduction and Rondo Capriccioso for Violin and Orchestra, Op.28. Orchestra: The Philadelphia Orchestra. Conductor: Wolfgang Sawallisch (EMI Classics)
- 1995: Ralph Vaughan Williams: The Lark Ascending. Conductor: Bernard Haitink (EMI Classics)
- 1996: Édouard Lalo: Symphonie Espagnole/Henri Vieuxtemps: Violin Concerto No. 5. Orchestra: Concertgebouw Orchestra (Lalo) / Philharmonia Orchestra (Vieuxtemps), Conductor: Charles Dutoit (EMI Classics)
- 1997: Simply Sarah/ Show Pieces/ Piano: Charles Abramovic (EMI Classics)
- 1998: Felix Mendelssohn, Jean Sibelius: Violin Concertos. Orchestra: Berliner Philharmoniker, Conductor: Mariss Jansons (EMI Classics)
- 1999: Sweet Sorrow/ Compilation Album includes Chaconne by Tomaso Antonio Vitali (EMI Classics)
- 1999: Richard Strauss: Violin Concerto and Violin Sonata. Symphonieorchester des Bayerischen Rundfunks, Conductor and Piano: Wolfgang Sawallisch (EMI Classics)
- 2000: Karl Goldmark: Violin Concerto op. 28. Orchestra: Gürzenich-Orchester, Conductor: James Conlon (EMI Classics)
- 2002: Fire & Ice. Pablo de Sarasate, Massenet, Maurice Ravel, Ludwig van Beethoven, Johann Sebastian Bach, Orchestra: Berliner Philharmoniker, Conductor: Plácido Domingo (EMI Classics)
- 2002: Antonín Dvořák, Pyotr Ilyich Tchaikovsky: Sextets (with Berlin Philharmonic Members) (EMI Classics)
- 2003: Antonín Dvořák: Violin Concerto Op. 53, Piano Quintet (with Leif Ove Andsnes), London Symphony Orchestra, Sir Colin Davis (EMI Classics)
- 2004: French Violin Sonatas includes. César Franck, Camille Saint-Saëns, Maurice Ravel Piano: Lars Vogt (EMI Classics)
- 2005: Andrew Lloyd Webber: Phantasia (with cellist Julian Lloyd Webber) (EMI Classics)
- 2006: Dmitri Shostakovich: Violin Concerto No. 1 / Sergei Prokofiev: Violin Concerto No. 1. Orchestra: Berliner Philharmoniker, Conductor: Sir Simon Rattle (EMI Classics)
- 2007: Antonio Vivaldi: The Four Seasons, and Violin Concerto in g, op.12 no.1, RV.317. Orchestra: Orpheus Chamber Orchestra (EMI Classics)
- 2009: Max Bruch Violin Concerto No. 1, Johannes Brahms Violin Concerto Kurt Masur, Dresdner Philharmonie (EMI Classics)

=== DVDs ===
- 1995: Niccolò Paganini Violin Concerto Berliner Philharmoniker, Zubin Mehta
- 2003: Spanish Night: Sarasate Carmen Fantasie, Zigeunerweisen, Thais Meditation, Berliner Philharmoniker, Plácido Domingo (Conductor)
