= Frank Howell Holden =

American architect (1870–1937)

- Born: June 8, 1870; Chicago, Illinois, US
- Died: May 29, 1937 (aged 66); New York, New York, US
- Education: Massachusetts Institute of Technology; École des Beaux-Arts; Chicago Manual Training School
- Occupation: Architect
- Partner: Frank H. Bosworth
- Practice: Kohn & Butler; Hoggson Brothers; Bosworth & Holden; Heins & LaFarge; Carẻrer & Hastings; Howard & Cauldwell
- Projects: R. H. Macy & Co.

Frank Howell Holden (June 8, 1870 – May 29, 1937) was an American architect who was most known for his work with Macy's and other New York City businesses.

== Early life ==
Holden was born in Chicago and grew up in Aurora, Illinois. His parents were Marian Howell and Timothy Nathan Holden, mayor of Aurora. He attended Robert Seyfarth's Chicago Manual Training School.

He then attended the Massachusetts Institute of Technology, graduating in 1894. While at MIT, he was a member of the Fraternity of Delta Psi (St. Anthony Hall). Next, he attended the École des Beaux-Arts in Paris for three years. There, he received honors in the competitive examination for scholarships. His brother, Ben Edwin Holden, also studied architecture at the École des Beaux-Arts at the same time.

== Career ==
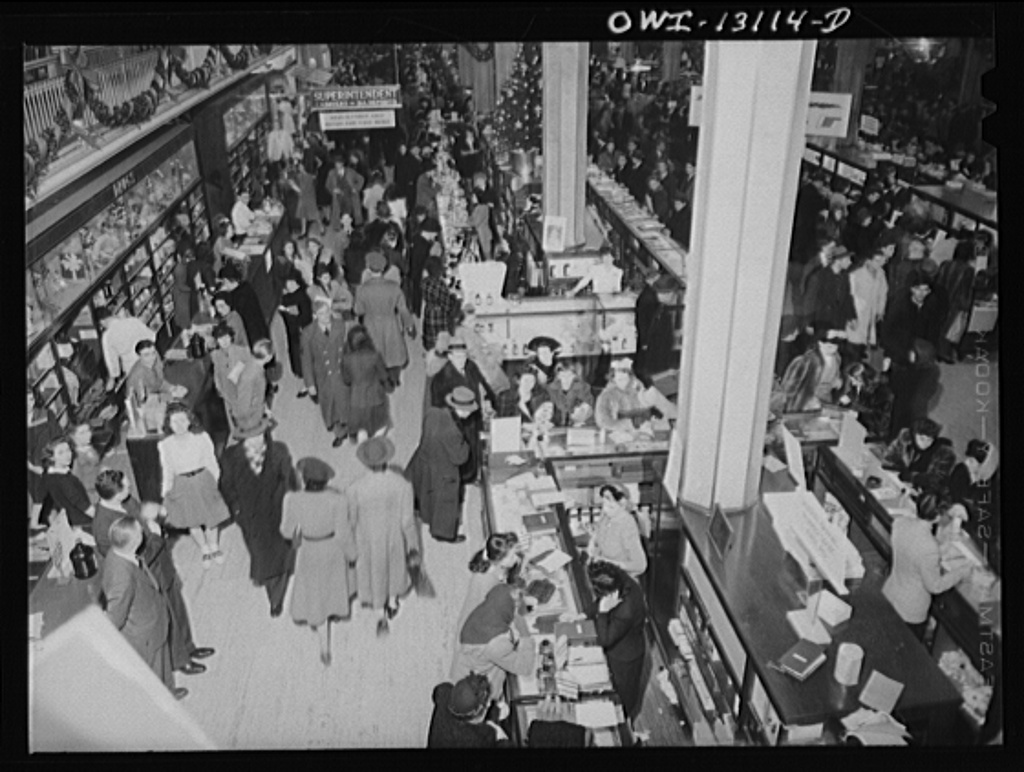
R. H. Macy and Company, interior

Initially, Holden practiced architecture in Aurora, Illinois and, by 1899, was practicing in Chicago. By 1900, he worked for John Galen Howard and Samuel M. Cauldwell of Howard & Cauldwell in New York City. Later, he worked at Carẻrer & Hastings, followed by Heins & LaFarge who both also attended MIT.

In 1902, he formed Bosworth & Holden with Frank H. Bosworth. Bosworth was a graduate of Yale University and the École des Beaux-Arts. Their offices were at 1170 Broadway, New York City. In 1911, Bosworth & Holden designed exterior alterations to a house a 105 Riverside Drive in Manhattan for Goddard and Josephine Cook DuBois. This house is now a New York City Landmark. However, Bosworth left to serve with the American Red Cross in France during World War I, and resigned from the firm when he became head of the school of architecture at Cornell University in 1920.

Holden became Director of Architecture for Hoggson Brothers, a firm that specialized in bank buildings. After World War I, he became an associate of Kohn & Butler of 56 West 45th Street in New York City. The principles in the practice which specialized in department stores were Robert D. Kohn and Charles Butler. After working on projects for R. H. Macy & Co. while it was under construction in 1924, Holden joined the department store as its director of interior design.

By 1932, he returned to private practice with associates J. Scott Dawson and Marshall Oliver. Their firm specialized in the design of commercial properties and stores. One of their projects was the Dennison Store at 37th Street and 5th Avenue in New York City. They also worked on the Doubleday, Doran Store that was beside Lord & Taylor in New York City.

== Professional affiliations ==
Holden was a member of the American Institute of Architects (AIA), the New York Chapter of AIA, the Architectural League of New York, and the Society of Beaux Arts Architects. In 1910, he served on the executive committee of the New York Chapter of AIA. In 1911, he was the advisor for the Real Estate Show held at the Grand Central Palace, ensuring AIA guidelines were applied to judging the entries of architectural drawings.

== Personal ==
Holden married Agnes M. Johnson on May 15, 1902, in the Church of the Epiphany in New York City. She was the daughter of Robert Underwood Johnson who was a writer, poet, and Ambassador to Italy. They had a daughter, Anne Holden, who was born in 1905.

Holden was a member of the Century Association. He was also an amateur violinist who frequently played with the Flonzaley Quartet and was also a member of a quartet with Edmund B. Wilson, George Englehard, and J. N. Hoover. In 1910, he served on the executive committee of the John More Association, a group consisting of the descendants of John and Betty Taylor More. In 1911, he served on the committee of the More Family Reunion. He also was chairman of the music committee for the reunion.

On May 29, 1937, Holden died of pneumonia at his home on 327 Lexington Avenue in New York City at the age of 67.
