= List of 18th-century chaconnes =

This is a list of 18th-century chaconnes. Included are all pieces of 18th-century music, or clearly marked off sections of pieces, labeled "chaconne" (or some variant of that word) by their composers, that have been found by contributors to this article among the works of musicians, musicologists, and music historians. A few pieces not labeled "chaconne" by their composers, when they have been clearly identified as chaconnes by later commentators, have also been included. A definitive list would be impossible to make, because there was in the 18th century, and there remains today, disagreement about the defining characteristics of a chaconne. That subject is treated in the article Chaconne.

Jump to decade:

- 1700–09
- 1710–19
- 1720–29
- 1730–39
- 1740–49
- 1750–59
- 1760–69
- 1770–79
- 1780–89
- 1790–99
- Bibliography

List of 18th-century Chaconnes
| Composer | Piece and original source | Standard catalogue reference or accessible sheet music | Recent audio recording |
1700–09
| anonymous | (1700 c.) French chaconne in ? for bagpipe, from a manuscript in the Bibliothèque nationale, Paris (c. 1700) | Hudson 1982, pp. xl & 125 | |
| Clarke, Jeremiah (c.1674–1707) | (1700 c.) Chacone in C major for keyboard, from a manuscript in the British Library, London (c. 1700) | Hudson 1982, pp. xl & 126–128 | |
| Kusser, Johann Sigismund (1660–1727) | (1700) Mvt. 8. Chaconne, in Suite 1 in ? for orchestra, from La cicala della cetra d'Eunomio (Stuttgart, 1700) | Kusser 2009, pp. ? | |
| Kusser, Johann Sigismund (1660–1727) | (1700) Mvt. 3. Chaconne, in Suite 2 in F major for orchestra, from Festin des muses (Stuttgart, 1700) | | Balázs Máté, Aura Musicale, Kusser: Festin des Muses: Orchestral Suites Nos. 1–3 (CD, Hungaroton, 2005) |
| Kusser, Johann Sigismund (1660–1727) | (1700) Mvt. 3. Chaconne, in Suite 3 in d minor for orchestra, from Festin des muses (Stuttgart, 1700) | | Balázs Máté, Aura Musicale, Kusser: Festin des Muses: Orchestral Suites Nos. 1–3 (CD, Hungaroton, 2005) |
| Kusser, Johann Sigismund (1660–1727) | (1700) Mvt. 15. Chaconne, Suite 4 in C major for orchestra, from Festin des muses (Stuttgart, 1700) | | Balázs Máté, Aura Musicale, Kusser: Festin des Muses: Orchestral Suites Nos. 4–6 (CD, Hungaroton, 2008) |
| Kusser, Johann Sigismund (1660–1727) | (1700) Mvt. 3. Chaconne, in Ouverture 4 in C major for 2 violins, viola, and basso continuo, from Apollon enjoué (Stuttgart, 1700) | Kusser 1994, pp. 222–231 | |
| Snep, Johan (1656–1719) | (1700) Chaconne in e minor, from Nederduytse Liederen met een en tuve stemmen en B.C., ingleichen Sonates (Amsterdam, 1700) | Snep 2008, pp. ? | |
| Snep, Johan (1656–1719) | (1700) Chaconne in D major, from Nederduytse Liederen met een en tuve stemmen en B.C., ingleichen Sonates (Amsterdam, 1700) | Snep 2008, pp. ? | |
| Handel, George Frideric (1685–1759) | (1700–1703) Chaconne and 49 variations, in Suite in C major for harpsichord (written 1700–1703) | Baselt 1976–1986, HWV 443 | Gilbert Rowland, Handel: Suites for Harpsichord, Vol. 1 (CD, Divine Art, 2011) |
| Handel, George Frideric (1685–1759) | (1700–1705 c.) Chaconne in C major and 49 variations for harpsichord (written c. 1700–1705) | Baselt 1976–1986, HWV 484 | Andrea Vigh, The Sound of Harp (CD, Capriccio, 2010) (arrangement for harp) |
| anonymous | (1701 c.) French chaconne in F major for viola da gamba and continuo, from a manuscript in the Bibliothèque nationale, Paris (c. 1701) | Hudson 1982, pp. xl & 131–134 | |
| Muffat, Georg (1653–1704) | (1701) Mvt. 4. Ciacona, in "Propitia sydera," Concerto Grosso 12 in G major, from Exquisitioris harmoniae instrumentalis (Passau, 1701) | Muffat 1905 | Peter Zajicek, Musica Aeterna Bratislava, Georg Muffat: Concerti Grossi, Nos. 7–12 (CD, Naxos, 2002) |
| Marais, Marin (1656–1728) | (1701) Chaconne en rondeau in G major for viola da gamba, from Pièces de viole, livre 2 (Paris, [1701]) | Marais 1686–1725, 2, pp. 128–130 (viola da gamba part) | Hille Perl, Lee Santana, Marais: Les Voix Humaines (CD, Deutsche Harmonia Mundi, 2008) |
| Philidor, André Danican (c.1652–1730) | (1701) Menuet en chaconne in G major for violins and oboe, from a manuscript in the Bibliothèque nationale, Paris (1701) | Hudson 1982, pp. xl & 135 | |
| Philidor, Anne Danican (1681–1728) | (1701) Menuet en chaconne in ? for violins and oboe, from a manuscript in the Bibliothèque nationale, Paris (1701) | Hudson 1982, pp. xl & 135 | |
| Schenck, Johannes (1660–c.1717) | (1702) Mvt. 1. Ciaccona, in Sonata 4 in A major for 2 violas da gamba, from Le Nymphe di Rheno (12 sonatas, Op. 8) (Amsterdam, 1702) | Schenck 1956, pp. 18–21 | Les Voix Humaines, Johannes Schenck: The Nymphs of the Rhine, Vol. 1 (CD, Naxos, 2000) |
| Schenck, Johannes (1660–c.1717) | (1702) Mvt. 3. Ciaccona, in Sonata 11 in G major for 2 violas da gamba, from Le Nymphe di Rheno (12 sonatas, Op. 8) (Amsterdam, 1702) | Schenck 1956, pp. 57–61 | Wieland Kuijken, François Joubert-Caillet, Johannes Schenck: Le Nymphe di Rheno (CD, Ricercar, 2013) |
| Handel, George Frideric (1685–1759) | (1703–06) Chaconne in G major and 62 variations for organ (written 1703–06, published 1733) | Baselt 1976–1986, HWV 442 | Richard Egarr, Academy of Ancient Music, Handel: Organ Concertos, Op. 7 (2 CDs, Harmonia Mundi, 2007) |
| Handel, George Frideric (1685–1759) | (1705) Chaconne in g minor for orchestra, from act 1 of the opera Almira (Hamburg, 1705) | Baselt 1976–1986, HWV 1 | Andrew Lawrence-King, Fiori Musicali, Handel: Almira (3 CDs, CPO, 1996) |
| Handel, George Frideric (1685–1759) | (1705–17) Chaconne in G major and 21 variations for harpsichord (written 1705–17, published 1733) | Baselt 1976–1986, HWV 435 | Gilbert Rowland, Handel: Suites for Harpsichord, Vol. 2 (CD, Divine Art, 2013) |
| Handel, George Frideric (1685–1759) | (1705 c.) Chaconne in F major for organ (written c. 1705) | Baselt 1976–1986, HWV 485 | Richard Egarr, Academy of Ancient Music, Handel: Organ Concertos, Op. 7 (2 CDs, Harmonia Mundi, 2007) |
| Handel, George Frideric (1685–1759) | (1705 c.) Chaconne in g minor for harpsichord (written c. 1705) | Baselt 1976–1986, HWV 486 | Claudia Klinkenberg, Weihnachten mit Georg Friedrich Händel (CD, Thorofon, 2011) |
| Campion, François (1686–1748) | (1705) Chaconne in B^{♭} major and chaconne in ?, both for guitar, from Nouvelles découvertes sur la guitarre (1705) | Campion 1993, pp. 13 & 16 | Eric Bellocq, François Campion, A Portrait (CD, Frame, 2003) |
| Bach, Johann Sebastian (1685–1750) | (1706) "Meine Tage in dem Leide," chaconne in b minor for 4 voices, chorus, and orchestra, from the cantata, Nach dir, Herr, verlanget mich (1706) | Schmieder 1950, BWV 150 | many recordings are available |
| Marais, Marin (1656–1728) | (1706) Chaconne in F major for 4 viols and basso continuo, final piece from Symphonies d'Alcione (Paris, 1706) | Marais 2006, pp. 38–48 | Jordi Savall, Le Concert des Nations, Marin Marais: Alcione, Suites des airs à jouer (CD, Astrée, 2000) |
| Martín y Coll, Antonio (c.1669–c.1735) | (1706–09) Chacona in ?, from Flores de música (written in Alcalá de Henares, 1706–09) | Martín y Coll 1979, pp. ? | Hesperion XX, El barroco español (CD, Virgin Classics, 1998) |
| Jacquet de La Guerre, Élisabeth (1665–1729) | (1707) Mvt. 11. Chaconne, in Suite No. 1 in d minor, from Pièces de clavecin qui peuvent se jouer sur le viollon (Paris, 1707) | Jacquet de La Guerre 2009, pp. 21–23 | Karen Flint, Le Clavecin Français: Elizabeth Jacquet de la Guerre's Complete Works for Harpsichord (CD, Plectra, 2010) |
| anonymous | (1708) Chacona in C major for keyboard, from a manuscript in the Biblioteca nacional, Madrid (1708) | Hudson 1982, pp. xl & 135–137 | |
| Marais, Marin (1656–1728) | (1709) Chaconne in G major for orchestra, from act 2 of the opera Sémélé (Paris, 1709) | Marais 1709, pp. ? | Hervé Niquet, Le Concert Spirituel, Marin Marais: Sémélé (2 CDs, Glossa, 2008) |
| Morel, Jacques (c.1690–1740) | (1709) Chaconne en trio (flute, viol, basso continuo) in G major, from Ier livre de pièces de violle avec une chaconne en trio (Paris, [1709]) | Morel n.d., pp. 39–44 | Irena Grafenauer, Brigitte Engelhard, Klaus Stoll, Jörg Baumann, Flute Gala in Versailles (CD, Philips, 2007) |
1710–19
| Marcello, Benedetto (1686–1739) | (1712 c.) Ciaccona in F major for flute and continuo, from 12 suonate a flauto solo, con il suo basso continuo per violoncello o cembalo, op. 2 (this piece comes after the 12 sonatas) (Amsterdam, c. 1712) | Selfridge-Field 1990, Z 766.1 | Michael Form, Dirk Börner, Melanie Flahaut, Delphine Biron, Vivaldiana: Venetian Flute Music by Vivaldi and His Contemporaries (CD, Pan, 2011) |
| Couperin, François (1668–1733) | (1713) Mvt. 9. "La Favorite," Chaconne-Rondeau, in Ordre 3ème de clavecin in c minor, from Pièces de clavecin, livre 1 (Paris, 1713) | Couperin n.d., pp. 87–91 | Blandine Rannou, François Couperin: Pièces pour clavecin (2 CDs, Zig Zag Territoires, 2004) |
| Couperin, François (1668–1733) | (1714) Mvt. 7. Chaconne, in Concerto no. 3 in A major, from Concerts royaux (Paris, 1714) | Couperin 1722, pp. 20–21 | Jordi Savall, Le Concert des Nations, François Couperin: Les Concerts Royaux (CD, Alia Vox, 2005) |
| Rebel, Jean-Féry (1666–1747) | (1715) Mvt. 5. Chaconne, from Les Caractères de la danse, ballet in D major for 7 instruments (Paris, 1715) | Rebel 1715, p. 3 | Daniel Cuiller, Arion Baroque Orchestra, Jean-Féry Rebel: Les Plaisirs champêtres (CD, Early Music, 2009) |
| Visée, Robert de (1655–1732/33) | (1716) Mvt. 6. Chaconne, in Suite in G major, from Pièces de théorbe et de luth (Paris, 1716) | Visée 1716, pp. 29–30 | José–Miguel Moreno, Robert de Visée: Pièces de Theorbe (CD, Glossa, 2009) |
| Visée, Robert de (1655–1732/33) | (1716) Mvt. 6. Chaconne, in Suite in d minor, from Pièces de théorbe et de luth (Paris, 1716) | Visée 1716, p. 87 | |
| Marais, Marin (1656–1728) | (1717) Mvt. 8. Chaconne, in Suite 3 in F major for viola da gamba & continuo, from Pièces de viole, livre 4 (Paris, 1717) | Marais 1686–1725, 4, pp. 21–22 | |
| Marais, Marin (1656–1728) | (1717) Final section chaconne, in "Le Labyrinthe," suite in A major for viola da gamba & continuo, from Pièces de viole, livre 4 (Paris, 1717) | Marais 1686–1725, 4, pp. 76–78 | Jordi Savall, Ton Koopman, Hopkinson Smith, Marin Marais: Pièces de viole du quatrième livre, 1717 (CD, Naïve, 2000) |
| Siret, Nicolas (1663–1754) | (1719) Mvt. 5. Chaconne, in Suite 3 in a minor for harpsichord, from Pièces de Clavecin, livre 2 (Paris, 1719) | Siret 1719, pp. 43–44 | |
| Siret, Nicolas (1663–1754) | (1719) Mvt. 6. Chaconne, in Suite 4 in A major for harpsichord, from Pièces de Clavecin, livre 2 (Paris, 1719) | Siret 1719, pp. 49–52 | |
1720–29
| Visée, Robert de (1655–1732/33) | (1720 c.) Chaconne in g minor for theorbo, from a manuscript in the Bibliothèque nationale, Paris (c. 1720) | Hudson 1982, pp. xl & 139 | |
| anonymous | (1720 c.) Chacone Arlequin in C major for theorbo, from a manuscript in the Bibliothèque nationale, Paris (c. 1720) | Hudson 1982, pp. xl & 139–140 | |
| Vivaldi, Antonio (1678–1741) | (1720 c.) Mvt. 3. Ciaccona, in Concerto in g minor for flute, oboe, violin, bassoon, strings (written in Mantua?, c. 1720) | Ryom 1974, RV 107 | many recordings are available |
| Bach, Johann Sebastian (1685–1750) | (1720) Mvt. 5. Chaconne, in Partita for violin no. 2 in d minor for solo violin (1720) | Schmieder 1950, BWV 1004 | many recordings are available of this most famous of all chaconnes |
| Handel, George Frideric (1685–1759) | (1720) "The Harmonious Blacksmith" or "Air and Variations in E major" for harpsichord. Also found in early manuscript scores as Chaconne in G major (at least 2 variant forms) | Baselt 1976–1986, HWV 430 | Trevor Pinnock, Handel: The Harmonious Blacksmith; 4 Suites for Harpsichord (CD, DG Arkiv, 1995) |
| Lalande, Michel-Richard de (1657–1726) | (1720) Chaconne légère, from the ballet Les folies de Cardenio (Paris, 1720) | Hudson 1982, pp. xl & 137–139 | Christophe Coin, Ensemble Baroque de Limoges, Michel-Richard de Lalande: Les Folies de Cardenio (CD, Laborie, 2006) |
| Mouret, Jean-Joseph (1682–1738) | (1722) Chaconne, from incidental music to the comedy La Force de l'Amour, by Lesage, Fuzelier et d'Orneval (Paris, 1722) | Viollier 1950, pp. 222–223 | |
| Bach, Johann Sebastian (1685–1750) | (1724) Opening chorale chaconne in g minor, "Jesu, der du meine Seele," from the cantata, Jesu, der du meine Seele (written in Leipzig, 1724) | Schmieder 1950, BWV 78 | many recordings are available |
| Couperin, François (1668–1733) | (1724) Mvt. 4. Chaconne légère, in Concerto no. 13 in G major for 2 treble instruments, from Les goûts-réunis, ou Nouveaux concerts (Paris, 1724) | Couperin 1724, pp. 54–55 | Wieland Kuijken, Robert Kohnen, Kaori Uemura, François Couperin: Pièces de violes (CD, Accent, 2000) |
| Couperin, François (1668–1733) | (1726) Mvt. 6. Chaconne ou passacaille, in "La françoise," Pièce en trio no. 1 in e minor for two treble and two bass instruments, from Les Nations: sonades; et suites de simphonies en trio (Paris, 1726) | Couperin 1726, p. 6 (first treble part) | The Hanoverian Ensemble, En Trio: French Baroque Trio Sonatas (CD, MSR Classics, 2003) |
| Mouret, Jean-Joseph (1682–1738) | (1727) Chaconne, from the ballet Les amours des dieux (Paris, 1727) | Mouret & n.d. [1727?], p. ? | |
| Couperin, François (1668–1733) | (1728) Mvt. 7. Chaconne, in Suite no. 1 in e minor, from Pièces de violes (Paris, 1728) | Couperin 1986, pp. ? | Jordi Savall, Ton Koopman, Ariane Maurette, François Couperin: Pièces de violes (CD, Naïve, 2002) |
| Telemann, Georg Philipp (1681–1767) | (1728–1729) Mvt. 2. "Lilliputsche Chaconne," in Intrada-Suite in D major for 2 violins, "Gulliver's Travels," from Der getreue Music-Meister (Hamburg, 1728–1729) | Ruhnke 1984–1999, TWV 40:108 | Andrew Manze, Caroline Balding, Telemann: Twelve Fantasias for Solo Violin & Gulliver Suite for Two Violins (CD, Harmonia Mundi USA, 1996) |
| Görner, Johann Valentin (1702–1762) | (1728–1729) Chaconne in b minor, from G. P. Telemann's Der getreue Music-Meister (Hamburg, 1728–1729) | Görner 2011 | |
| Rebel, Jean-Féry (1666–1748) | (1729) Mvt. 2. Chaconne and Mvt. 5. Chaconne, from the ballet Fantaisie in D major for orchestra (Paris, 1729) | Rebel 1729, pp. 2–3 & 6–7 | Daniel Cuiller, Arion Baroque Orchestra, Jean-Féry Rebel: Les Plaisirs champêtres (CD, Early Music, 2009) |
1730–39
| Campion, François (1686–1748) | (1731) Chacone in D major for guitar, from a manuscript in the Bibliothèque nationale, Paris (1731) | Hudson 1982, pp. xl & 141 | |
| Campion, François (1686–1748) | (1731) Chacone in a minor for guitar, from a manuscript in the Bibliothèque nationale, Paris (1731) | Hudson 1982, pp. xl & 142 | |
| Boismortier, Joseph Bodin de (1689–1755) | (1732) Mvt. 18. Chaconne in F major, in Serenade 1, from 2 sérénades ou simphonies françaises en trois parties pour flûtes, violons et haubois, op. 39 (Paris, 1732) | Boismortier 1732, pp. 6–7 | Hervé Niquet, Le Concert Spirituel, Boismortier: Sérénades françaises et Fragments mélodiques (CD, Naxos, 2001) |
| Boismortier, Joseph Bodin de (1689–1755) | (1732) Mvt. 15. Chaconne in e minor, in Serenade 2, from 2 sérénades ou simphonies françaises en trois parties pour flûtes, violons et haubois, op. 39 (Paris, 1732) | Boismortier 1732, p. 12 | |
| Agincourt, François d' (1684–1758) | (1733) "Chaconne: La Sonning" in F major, from Pièces de clavecin (Paris, 1733) | Agincourt 1733, pp. 16–17 | Rebecca Pechefsky, François d'Agincourt: Complete Works For Harpsichord, vol. 2 (CD, Quill, 2005) |
| Handel, George Frideric (1685–1759) | (1734) Chaconne from the Terpsichore prologue added to the 1734 revision of the opera Il pastor fido (London, 1734) | Baselt 1976–1986, HWV 8b | Hanspeter Gmür, Camerata Rhenania, Handel: Suite from "Il pastor fido," Terpsichore HWV8b (CD, Red Note OMP, 2010) |
| Rebel, Jean-Féry (1666–1748) | (1734) Mvt. 4. Chaconne in D major, from Les Plaisirs champêtres (Paris, n.d.[1734]) | Rebel & n.d. [1734], p. 3 | Daniel Cuiller, Arion Baroque Orchestra, Jean-Féry Rebel: Les Plaisirs champêtres (CD, Early Music, 2009) |
| Rameau, Jean-Philippe (1683–1764) | (1735) Chaconne in d minor, from act 5 of the opera-ballet Les Indes galantes (Paris, 1735) | Bouissou, Herlin & Denécheau 2003–2012, RCT 44 | Jean-François Paillard, J.–F. Paillard Chamber Orchestra, Rameau: Les Indes Galantes (2 CDs, Erato, 1994) |
| Rebel, Jean-Féry (1666–1748) | (1737) Mvt. 3. Chaconne in D major, "Le feu," from Les Éléments, simphonie nouvelle (Paris, n.d.[1737]) | Rebel & n.d. [1737], pp. 11–14 | Daniel Cuiller, Arion Baroque Orchestra, Jean-Féry Rebel: Les Plaisirs champêtres (CD, Early Music, 2009) |
| Boismortier, Joseph Bodin de (1689–1755) | (1737) Chaconne in ?, from Fragmens mélodiques, ou Simphonies en trio, op. 65 (Paris, 1737) | | Hervé Niquet, Le Concert Spirituel, Boismortier: Sérénades françaises et Fragments mélodiques (CD, Naxos, 2001) |
| Boismortier, Joseph Bodin de (1689–1755) | (1737) Chaconne in A major, from 9 petites sonates et chaconne, for 2 cellos, op. 66 (Paris, 1737) | Boismortier 2012 | Musica Franca, Joseph Bodin de Boismortier: Sonatas For Two Bassoons And Continuo (CD, MSR Classics, 2006) |
| Boismortier, Joseph Bodin de (1689–1755) | (1737) Mvt. 15. Chaconne in a minor for two treble instruments and one bass instrument, from Fragmens mélodiques, ou Simphonies en trois parties, livre 2, op. 69 (Paris, 1737) | Boismortier 1737, pp. 6–7 (first treble part) | |
| Leclair, Jean-Marie (1697–1764) | (1737) Chaconne in g minor for 2 recorders or violins and continuo, from Deuxième recréation de la musique, op. 8 (Paris, n.d.[1737]) | Leclair & n.d. [1737], pp. 6–7 (first treble part) | The Hanoverian Ensemble, En Trio: French Baroque Trio Sonatas (CD, MSR Classics, 2003) |
| Fischer, Johann Caspar Ferdinand (c.1656–1746) | (1738) Mvt. 5. Chaconne, in Suite 3 in a minor for organ, "Melpomène," from Musikalischer Parnassus (Augsburg, 1738) | Fischer 2008–2009, suite 3, pp. 4–5 | Albert Bolliger, Historische Orgeln der Schweiz, Vol. 6 (CD, Sinus, 2000) |
| Fischer, Johann Caspar Ferdinand (c.1656–1746) | (1738) Mvt. 3. Chaconne, in Suite 5 in e minor for organ, "Erato," from Musikalischer Parnassus (Augsburg, 1738) | Fischer 2008–2009, suite 5, pp. 3–4 | |
| Fischer, Johann Caspar Ferdinand (c.1656–1746) | (1738) Mvt. 6. Chaconne, in Suite 6 in F major for organ, "Euterpe," from Musikalischer Parnassus (Augsburg, 1738) | Fischer 2008–2009, suite 6, pp. 4–8 | Rinaldo Alessandrini, Chaconne (CD, Naïve, 2010) |
| Telemann, Georg Philipp (1681–1767) | (1738) Mvt. 6. Modéré [chaconne], in Quatuor 6 in e minor, from Nouveaux quatuors en six suites (Paris, 1738) | Ruhnke 1984–1999, TWV 43:e4 | Franz Brüggen, Anner Bylsma, Gustav Leonhardt, Jaap Schröder, Telemann: Nouveaux quatuors en six suites (CD, Teldec, 1993) |
| Rameau, Jean-Philippe (1683–1764) | (1739) Chaconne in d minor, from act 2 of the opera-ballet Les fêtes d'Hébé (Paris, 1739) | Bouissou, Herlin & Denécheau 2003–2012, RCT 41 | William Christie, Les Arts Florissants, Rameau: Les fêtes d'Hébé (2 CDs, Erato, 1998) |
| Muffat, Gottlieb (1690–1770) | (1739 c.) Ciacona for harpsichord in G major, the sole mvt. of Suite 7, from Componimenti Musicali per il Cembalo (Augsburg, n.d.[c.1739]) | Muffat & n.d. [c.1739], pp. 93–105 | Mitzi Meyerson, Gottlieb Muffat: Componimenti Musicali per il Cembalo (2 CDs, Glossa, 2009) |
1740–49
| Handel, George Frideric (1685–1759) | (1740) Mvt. 1 & 2. Chaconne, in Concerto for organ and orchestra in B^{♭} major (London, 1740) | Baselt 1976–1986, HWV 306 | many recordings are available |
| Rameau, Jean-Phillippe (1683–1764) | (1745) Chaconne in A major, from act 3 of the comic opera Platée, ou Junon jalouse (Paris, 1745) | Bouissou, Herlin & Denécheau 2003–2012, RCT 53 | Ensemble Vocal Françoise Herr, Les Musiciens du Louvre, Marc Minkowski, Jean-Philippe Rameau: Platée (2 CDs, Erato, 2010) |
| Boismortier, Joseph Bodin de (1689–1755) | (1747) Chaconne in G major, from act 3 of the opera Daphnis et Chloé, op. 102 (Paris, 1747) | Boismortier n.d., pp. 128–134 | Hervé Niquet, Le Concert Spirituel, Boismortier: Daphnis et Chloé (2 CDs, Glossa, 2002) |
| Forqueray, Antoine (1671–1745) | (1747) Mvt. 5. Chaconne "La Buisson," in Suite 2 in G major for viola da gamba and harpsichord, from Pièces de viole (Paris, 1747) | Forqueray 1747, pp. 12–13 | Rinaldo Alessandrini, Chaconne (CD, Naïve, 2010) |
| Forqueray, Antoine (1671–1745) | (1747) Mvt. 7 Chaconne "La Morangis ou La Plissay," in Suite 3 in D major for viola da gamba and harpsichord, from Pièces de viole (Paris, 1747) | Forqueray 1747, pp. 20–21 | Paolo Pandolfo, Forqueray: Pièces de Viole avec la Basse Continuë (2 CDs, Glossa, 2001) |
1750–59
| Handel, George Frideric (1685–1759) | (1750) Mvt. 3. Chaconne, in Concerto in g minor for organ and orchestra (London, 1750) | Baselt 1976–1986, HWV 310 | Seattle Baroque Orchestra, Tra le fiamme: Dramatic Solo Cantatas (CD, Wild Boar, 1996) |
| Duphly, Jacques (1715–89) | (1756) Chaconne in F major, from Pièces de clavecin, troisième livre (Paris, n.d.[1756]) | Duphly & n.d. [1756], pp. 10–14 | Jos van Immerseel, Laurence Boulay, Duphly, Boismortier: Pièces de clavecin (CD, Erato, 2008) |
1760–69
| Berton, Pierre-Mountain (1727–1780) | (1762) "Chaconne de Lebreton" or "Nouvelle chaconne," in e minor, from the manuscript "Le feu de M. Le Berton au Roy" in the Bibliothèque nationale de France, Paris (1777) (first performance of piece: Paris, 1762) | Berton 2010, pp. 127–155 | Reinhard Goebel, Bayerische Kammer-philharmonie, Mozart in Paris (CD, Oehms, 2007) |
| Gluck, Christoph Willibald (1714–1787) | (1762) Chaconne in D major for orchestra, from act 3 of the opera Orfeo ed Euridice (Vienna, 1762); also used in act 3 of Gluck's opera Iphigénie en Aulide (Paris, 1774) | Wotquenne 1904, Wq 30 (Orfeo ed Euridice) & Wq 40 (Iphigénie en Aulide) | Herbert von Karajan, Vienna Philharmonic Orchestra, Gluck: Orfeo ed Euridice (2 CDs, Opera d'Oro, 2001) |
| Jommelli, Niccolò (1714–1774) | (1764) Ciaccona per orchestra, op. 5, no. 13, in ? major (Naples, 1764) | | Antonio Florio, Cappella di Turchini, Tesori di Napoli, vol. 9: Jommelli (CD, Opus 111, 1999) |
| Jommelli, Niccolò (1714–1774) | (1766) Overture e chaconne per organo o cembalo, in E^{♭} major (Naples, 1766) | Jommelli 2007 | Arturo Sacchetti, L'Organo Napoletano nel XVIII Secolo (CD, Arts Music, 1997) |
1770–79
| Boccherini, Luigi (1743–1805) | (1771) "Chaconne qui représente l'enfer . . . à l'imitation de celle de M. Gluck," finale to Symphony in d minor for chamber orchestra, op. 12, no. 4 (written Madrid, 1771) | Gérard 1969, G 506 | many recordings are available |
| Kirnberger, Johann Philipp (1721–1783) | (1777) Air 4. Chaconne in D major for keyboard, from Recueil d'airs de danse caractéristiques (Berlin, 1777) | Kirnberger 2011 | |
| Gluck, Christoph Willibald (1714–1787) | (1777) Chaconne in B^{♭} major for orchestra, from act 5 of the opera Armide (Paris, 1777) | Wotquenne 1904, Wq 45 | Marc Minkowski, Les musiciens du Louvre, Gluck: Armide (2 CDs, Deutsche Grammophon, 1999) |
1780–89
| Mozart, Wolfgang Amadeus (1756–1791) | Chaconne in D major for orchestra, from the ballet music for the opera Idomeneo, re di Creta ossia Ilia e Idamante (Munich, 1781) (the theme of this piece was taken from Gluck's chaconne in Orfeo ed Euridice) | Köchel 1862, K 367 | many recordings are available |
1790–99
17??
| Visée, Robert de (1655–1732/33) | (undated) Chaconne in d minor for guitar, from a manuscript in the Bibliothèque nationale, Paris | Visée 2008, p. 138 | David Jacques, Robert de Visée: The Complete Works for Guitar (3 CDs, Disques XXI, 2007) |
| Visée, Robert de (1655–1732/33) | (undated) Chaconne in D major for guitar, from a manuscript in the Bibliothèque nationale, Paris | Visée 2008, p. 146 | David Jacques, Robert de Visée: The Complete Works for Guitar (3 CDs, Disques XXI, 2007) |
| Vitali, Tomaso Antonio (1663–1745), presumed composer | (undated) Ciaccona for violin and continuo in g minor, from a manuscript in the Sächsische Landes–bibliothek, Dresden | Vitali 2012 | many recordings are available |
| Bach, Johann Bernhard (1676–1749) | (undated) Chaconne in B^{♭} major for keyboard | Schmieder 1950, BWV Anh. 82 (formerly attributed to JS Bach) | Kevin Bowyer, Bach: The Clock Pieces, BWV Anh. 133–150 (2 CDs, Nimbus, 2004) |
| Bach, Johann Bernhard (1676–1749) | (undated) Chaconne in A major for keyboard | Schmieder 1950, BWV Anh. 83 (formerly attributed to JS Bach) | Kevin Bowyer, Bach: The Clock Pieces, BWV Anh. 133–150 (2 CDs, Nimbus, 2004) |
| Bach, Johann Bernhard (1676–1749) | (undated) Chaconne in G major for keyboard | Schmieder 1950, BWV Anh. 84 (formerly attributed to JS Bach) | Kevin Bowyer, Bach: The Clock Pieces, BWV Anh. 133–150 (2 CDs, Nimbus, 2004) |
| Telemann, Georg Philipp (1681–1767) | (undated) Mvt. 5. Chaconne, in Ouverture-Suite in G major for strings, reeds, and continuo | Ruhnke 1984–1999, TWV 55:G9 | Simon Standage, Collegium Musicum 90, Telemann: Burlesque de Quixotte (CD, Chandos, 2003) |
| Telemann, Georg Philipp (1681–1767) | (undated) Mvt. 5. Chaconne, in Ouverture-Suite in b minor for strings, reeds, and continuo | Ruhnke 1984–1999, TWV 55:H1 | Simon Standage, Collegium Musicum 90, Telemann: Burlesque de Quixotte (CD, Chandos, 2003) |
| Weiss, Silvius Leopold (1687–1750) | (undated) Mvt. 11. Chaconne, in Sonata 1 in F major for lute, from a manuscript in the Biblioteka Uniwersytecka, Warsaw | Weiss 1983–1990, Sm 573 | Michel Cardin, Silvius Leopold Weiss: Le Manuscrit de Londres, vol. 1 (CD, Société nouvelle d'enregistrement, 1997) |
| Weiss, Silvius Leopold (1687–1750) | (undated) Mvt. 9. Chaconne, in Sonata 2 in D major for lute, from a manuscript in the Biblioteka Uniwersytecka, Warsaw | Weiss 1983–1990, Sm 576 | Robert Barto, Silvius Leopold Weiss: Sonatas for Lute, vol. 3 (CD, Naxos, 1999) |
| Weiss, Silvius Leopold (1687–1750) | (1706–1725) Mvt. 7. Chaconne, in Sonata 10 in E^{♭} major for lute, from a manuscript in the British Library, London (1706–1725) | Weiss 1983–1990, Sm 53 | Michel Cardin, Silvius Leopold Weiss: Le Manuscrit de Londres, vol. 2 (CD, Société nouvelle d'enregistrement, 1998?) |
| Weiss, Silvius Leopold (1687–1750) | (1706–1725) Mvt. 7. Chaconne, in Sonata 12 in A major for lute, from a manuscript in the British Library, London (1706–1725) | Weiss 1983–1990, Sm 66 | Michel Cardin, Silvius Leopold Weiss: Le Manuscrit de Londres, vol. 3 (CD, Société nouvelle d'enregistrement, 1997?) |
| Weiss, Silvius Leopold (1687–1750) | (1706–1725) Mvt. 6. Chaconne, in Sonata 14 in g minor for flute and lute, from a manuscript in the British Library, London (1706–1725) | Weiss 1983–1990, Sm 80 | Michel Cardin, Silvius Leopold Weiss: Le Manuscrit de Londres, vol. 12 (CD, Société nouvelle d'enregistrement, 2008?) |

== Bibliography ==
- Agincourt, François d' (1733). Pièces de clavecin. Paris: Boivin, Le Clerc. Available at http://imslp.org/wiki/Pi%C3%A8ces_de_clavecin_%28Agincour,_Fran%C3%A7ois_d%27%29
- Baselt, Bernd (1976–1986). Verzeichnis der Werke Georg Friedrich Händels (HWV). Leipzig: Deutscher Verlag für Musik. This book's HVW catalog available at http://imslp.org/wiki/List_of_works_by_George_Frideric_Handel
- Berton, Pierre-Montan (2010) [1777]. "Le feu de M. Le Berton au Roy". Bibliothèque nationale de France, Gallica
- Boismortier, Joseph Bodin de (1732). 2 sérénades ou simphonies françaises en trois parties pour flûtes, violons et haubois. Paris: auteur. Available at http://gallica.bnf.fr/ark:/12148/btv1b90832308/f1.image.r=boismortier%20serenades.langEN
- ——— (1737). Fragmens mélodiques, ou Simphonies en trois parties, livre 2. Paris: auteur. Available at http://gallica.bnf.fr/ark:/12148/btv1b90642212/f1.image.r=boismortier%20fragmens.langEN
- ——— (n.d.) [1748]. Daphnis et Chloé. Paris: auteur; Boivin; Le Clerc. Available at http://imslp.org/wiki/Daphnis_et_Chlo%C3%A9,_Op.102_%28Boismortier,_Joseph_Bodin_de%29
- Boismortier, Joseph Bodin de (2012). Sáez, José Ramón (ed.). "Chaconne in A major". International Music Score Library Project
- Bouissou, Silvie; Herlin, Denis; Denécheau, Pascal (2003–2012). Jean-Philippe Rameau: Catalogue thématique des œuvres musicales. Paris: CNRS.
- Campion, François (1993) [1705]. Nouvelles découvertes sur la guitarre. New York: Performers' Facsimiles.
- Couperin, François (1722). Concerts royaux. Paris: auteur. Available at http://imslp.org/wiki/Concerts_royaux_%28Couperin,_Fran%C3%A7ois%29
- ——— (1724). Les goûts-réunis, ou Nouveaux concerts. Paris: auteur. Available at http://imslp.org/wiki/Les_go%C3%BBts-r%C3%A9unis,_ou_Nouveaux_concerts_%28Couperin,_Fran%C3%A7ois%29
- ——— (1726). Les Nations: sonades; et suites de simphonies en trio. Paris: auteur. Available at http://imslp.org/wiki/Les_Nations_%28Couperin,_Fran%C3%A7ois%29
- ——— (n.d.). Diémer, Louis (ed.). Pièces de clavecin, livre 1. Paris: Durand. Available at http://imslp.org/wiki/Pi%C3%A8ces_de_Clavecin_%28Couperin,_Fran%C3%A7ois%29
- ——— (1986) [1728]. Pièces de violes avec la basse chiffrée. Geneva: Minkoff.
- Duphly, Jacques (n.d.) [1756]. Pièces de clavecin, troisième livre. Paris: auteur. Available at http://imslp.org/wiki/Pi%C3%A8ces_de_clavecin_%28Du_Phly,_Jacques%29
- Fischer, Johann Caspar Ferdinand (2008–2009). Decoster, Jeremy (ed.). "Musicalischer Parnassus". International Music Score Library Project
- Forqueray, Antoine (1747). Pièces de viole. Paris: auteur. Available at http://imslp.org/wiki/Pi%C3%A8ces_de_viole_%28Forqueray,_Antoine%29
- Gérard, Yves (1969). Thematic, Bibliographical and Critical Catalogue of the Works of Luigi Boccherini. London: Oxford UP. This book's G catalog available at http://imslp.org/wiki/List_of_works_by_Luigi_Boccherini
- Görner, Johann Valentin (2011). Csakan (ed.). "Chaconne in b minor". International Music Score Library Project
- Hudson, Richard (1982). The Folia, the Saraband, the Passacaglia, and the Chaconne: The Historical Evolution of Four Forms that Originated in Music for the Five-Course Spanish Guitar. Vol. 4: The Chaconne. Neuhausen-Stuttgart: Haenssler.
- Jacquet de La Guerre, Élisabeth (2009). Wiberg, Steve (ed.). "Pièces de clavecin qui peuvent se jouer sur le violon (1707)". International Music Score Library Project
- Jommelli, Niccolò (2007). Machella, Maurizio (ed.). Overture e chaconne per organo o cembalo. Padua: Armelin Musica.
- Kirnberger, Johann Philipp (2011). Gouin, Pierre (ed.). "Chaconne". International Music Score Library Project
- Köchel, Ludwig Ritter von (1862). Chronologisch-thematisches Verzeichniss sämmtlicher Tonwerke Wolfgang Amade Mozart's. Leipzig: Breitkopf & Härtel.
- Kusser, Johann Sigismund (1994). Bayreuther, Rainer (ed.). Suiten für Orchester. Mainz: Schott.
- ——— (2009). Robertson, Michael (ed.). La Cicala della cetra d'Eunomio - Suite No. 1. Magdeburg: Walhall, Biersack.
- Leclair, Jean-Marie (n.d.) [1737]. Deuxième récréation de musique. Paris: auteur. Available at http://imslp.org/wiki/Deuxi%C3%A8me_r%C3%A9cr%C3%A9ation_de_musique,_Op.8_%28Leclair,_Jean-Marie%29
- Marais, Marin (1686–1725). Pièces de viole. Paris: auteur. 5 vols. Available at http://imslp.org/wiki/Pi%C3%A8ces_de_viole_(Marais,_Marin)
- ——— (1709). Sémélé. Paris: auteur. Available at http://imslp.org/wiki/S%C3%A9m%C3%A9l%C3%A9_%28Marais,_Marin%29
- ——— (2006). uncredited (ed.). Symphonies d'Alcione. Versailles: Centre de Musique Baroque de Versailles.
- Martín y Coll, Antonio (1979). Stella, Carlo; Vinay, Vittorio (eds.). Composizioni inedite dai "Flores de música". Milan: Suvini Zerboni.
- Morel, Jacques (n.d.) [1709]. Ier livre de pièces de violle avec une chaconne en trio. Paris: auteur. Available at http://gallica.bnf.fr/ark:/12148/btv1b9010026t/f2.zoom.r=morel,%20jacques.langEN
- Mouret, Jean-Joseph (n.d.) [1727?]. Les Amours des dieux. Paris: auteur. Available at http://imslp.org/wiki/Les_amours_des_dieux_%28Mouret,_Jean-Joseph%29
- Muffat, Georg (1905). "Propitia sydera". In Luntz, Erwin, ed. Denkmäler der Tonkunst in Österreich, vol. 23, pp. 75–104. Vienna: Österreichischer Bundesverlag. Available at http://imslp.org/wiki/Propitia_sydera_%28Muffat,_Georg%29
- Muffat, Gottlieb (n.d.) [c. 1739]. Componimenti musicali per il cembalo. Augsburg: Leopold. Available at http://imslp.org/wiki/Componimenti_musicali_%28Muffat,_Gottlieb%29
- Rebel, Jean-Féry (1715). Les Caractères de la danse. Paris: auteur. Available at http://imslp.org/wiki/Les_caract%C3%A8res_de_la_danse_%28Rebel,_Jean-F%C3%A9ry%29
- ——— (1729). Fantaisie. Paris: auteur. Available at http://imslp.org/wiki/Fantaisie_%28Rebel,_Jean-F%C3%A9ry%29
- ——— (n.d.) [1734]. Les Plaisirs champêtres. Paris: Le Clerc. Available at http://imslp.org/wiki/Les_Plaisirs_Champ%C3%AAtres_%28Rebel,_Jean-F%C3%A9ry%29
- ——— (n.d.) [1737]. Les Éléments, simphonie nouvelle. Paris: Le Clerc. Available at http://imslp.org/wiki/Les_%C3%A9l%C3%A9ments_%28Rebel,_Jean-F%C3%A9ry%29
- Ruhnke, Martin (1984–1999). Georg Philipp Telemann: thematisch-systematisches Verzeichnis seiner Werke: Telemann-Werke-Verzeichnis (TWV). Kassel: Bärenreiter. This book's TWV catalog available at http://imslp.org/wiki/List_of_works_by_Georg_Philipp_Telemann
- Ryom, Peter (1974). Verzeichnis der Werke Antonio Vivaldis (RV). Leipzig: Deutscher Verlag für Musik. This book's RV catalog available at http://imslp.org/wiki/List_of_works_by_Antonio_Vivaldi
- Schenck, Johannes (1956). Pauls, Karl Heinz (ed.). Le nymphe di Rheno. Das Erbe Deutscher Musik, vol. 44. Kassel: Nagel. Available at http://imslp.org/wiki/Le_nymphe_di_Rheno,_Op.8_%28Schenck,_Johann%29
- Schmieder, Wolfgang (1950). Thematisch-systematisches Verzeichnis der musikalischen Werke von Johann Sebastian Bach: Bach-Werke-Verzeichnis (BWV). Leipzig: Breitkopf & Härtel. This book's BWV catalog available at http://imslp.org/wiki/List_of_works_by_Johann_Sebastian_Bach
- Selfridge-Field, Eleanor (1990). The Music of Benedetto and Alessandro Marcello: A Thematic Catalogue with Commentary on the Composers, Works and Sources. Oxford: Oxford UP.
- Siret, Nicolas (1719). Pièces de Clavecin, livre 2. Paris: Foucault. Available at http://imslp.org/wiki/Pi%C3%A8ces_de_Clavecin,_Livre_2_%28Siret,_Nicolas%29
- Snep, Johan (2008). Tetampel, Olaf (ed.). Sonates: Zehn Sonaten für Viola da gamba und Basso continuo. Bremen: Edition Baroque.
- Viollier, Renée (1950). Jean-Joseph Mouret, le musicien des grâces, 1682-1738. Paris: Floury.
- Visée, Robert de (1716). Pièces de théorbe et de luth. Paris: Bellanger; Hurel. Available ahttp://imslp.org/wiki/Pi%C3%A8ces_de_th%C3%A9orbe_et_de_luth_%28Vis%C3%A9e,_Robert_de%29t
- ——— (2008). Strizich, Robert (ed.). The Complete Guitar Works of Robert de Visée. Saint-Nicolas, Québec: Doberman-Yppan.
- Vitali, Tomaso Antonio (2012). Kram, Richard (ed.). "Chaconne for Violin and Basso Continuo in g minor". International Music Score Library Project
- Weiss, Silvius Leopold (1983–1990). Smith, Douglas Alton (ed.). The Complete Works for Lute. Frankfurt: Peters. This book's Sm catalog available at http://www.slweiss.de/index.php?id=3&type=worklist&lang=eng&smith
- Wotquenne, Alfred (1904). Catalogue Thématique des Œuvres de Chr. W. v. Gluck. Leipzig: Breitkopf & Härtel. This book's Wq catalog available at http://imslp.org/wiki/List_of_works_by_Christoph_Willibald_Gluck
