= Léopold Charlier =

Belgian violinist (b. 1867, d. 1936)

- Born: November 8, 1867; Liège, Wallonia, Belgium
- Died: July 23, 1936 (aged 68); Liège, Wallonia, Belgium
- Occupations: Violinist and Music Teacher

Léopold Charlier (November 8, 1867 – July 23, 1936) was a Belgian violinist and music teacher.

== Biography ==
Léopold Charlier graduated from the Liège Conservatory (1888) in the class of Rodolphe Massart, nephew of the well-known Belgian violinist Lambert Massart. In 1887 he debuted as a soloist. Between 1892 and 1897, he led an amateur orchestra in Liège. From 1894 until the end of his life, he headed the well-known string quartet in the city who performed, in particular, the premiere of the first quartet of Joseph Jongen on March 6, 1895. From 1900 to 1906, he led the choir in Malmedy and from 1910 until the end of his life headed the city symphony orchestra. From 1898 to 1932, Charlier taught at the Liège Conservatory.

Charlier is best known for his 1911 arrangement of the Chaconne in G minor by Tomaso Antonio Vitali. Although Charlier based his version on a previous arrangement by Ferdinand David, he significantly enhanced the technical demands of the violin part. He made changes in harmonizations of the piano part, while reordering the sequence of variations to become increasingly more complex as the piece progresses.
