= Louis Bailly =

Canadian music educator and violist

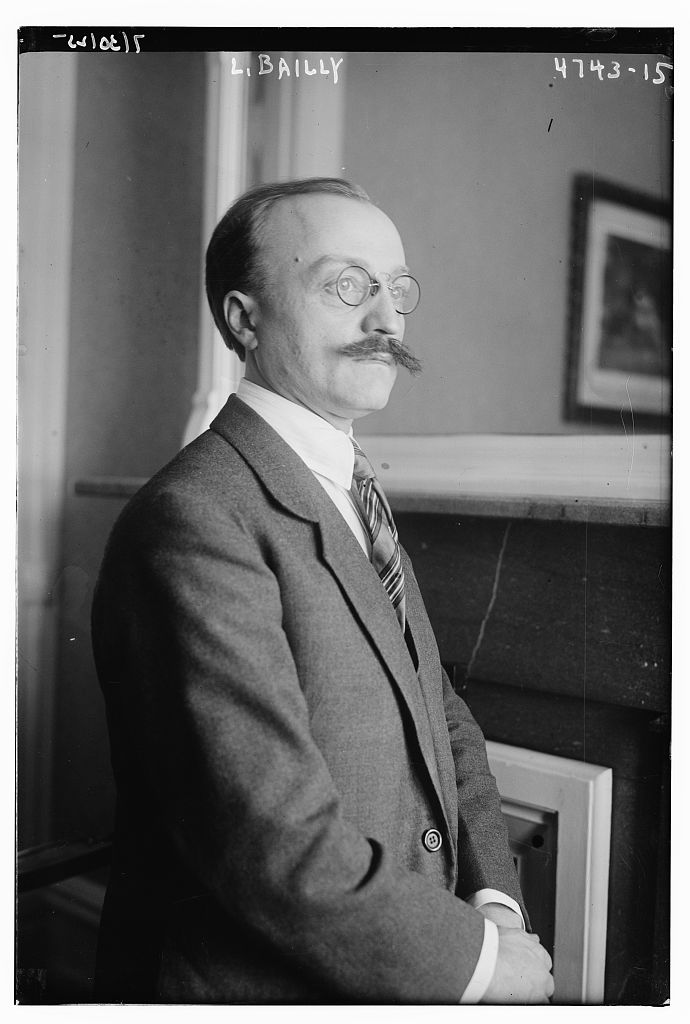
Louis Bailly (1882-1974) in 1918

Louis Bailly was a French-Canadian violist and music educator. He was born on 18 June 1882 in Valenciennes, France and died on 21 November 1974 in Cowansville, Quebec.

== Biography ==
Bailly studied violin and viola at the Conservatoire de Paris until 1899. He then became a violist for the Paris Opera, the Opéra-Comique, and the Concerts Colonne. He became a founding member of the Capet Quartet in 1903 and was also a member of the Geloso and Elman quartets. He became a Canadian citizen in 1950 and was a Knight of the Legion of Honour.

=== Flonzaley Quartet from 1917 to 1924 ===
The Flonzaley Quartet was founded by Eduard de Coppet as his private ensemble. When the ensemble's violist, Ugo Ara, volunteered for the Italian Army, the quartet began seeking for a new violist to fill the role. They asked Jacques Thibaud and Pierre Monteux for a recommendation, but the most desirable violists were still under contract. Alfred Cortot finally suggested that Louis Bailly be considered. In 1917, Bailly came to America and joined the quartet for two years until Ara returned. However, not long after this, he gained serious health problems and had to depart the quartet. Bailly, who had since joined the Berkshire String Quartet, was convinced back into the quartet. Bailly, in the end, played a total of seven years for the Flonzaley Quartet until 1924.

Because of considerable tension between Bailly and its other members, Bailly was informed in December 1923 that his contract would expire 6 April 1924 and would not be extended. A bitter Bailly demanded on 4 March 1924 that the quartet be dissolved and that after 1 June 1924 it should not appear under the name "Flonzaley Quartet." He even demanded that the name be actioned off; he believed that the quartet was a commercial company covered by New York's partnership laws. Soon after, he obtained a restraining order that restricted the quartet from leading under the name "Flonzaley." After a lower court determined this to be unenforceable, Bailly turned to the Supreme Court of New York. After this, the quartet returned to England, picking up Felicien d'Archambeau as a new violist. The courts decided in favor of the quartet and de Coppet, as the name "Flonzaley" had been chosen by de Coppet and had existed for years before Bailly's arrival, operating as a quite successful ensemble.

=== As an educator ===
Bailly taught at the Curtis Institute in Philadelphia from 1925 to 1941. Some of his students here include Stanley Solomon and Clermont Pépin. From 1943 to 1957, he taught violin, viola, and chamber music at the Conservatoire de musique du Québec. Here, he taught Ethel Stark and, from 1944 to 1945, supervised a string quartet formed by Noël Brunet, Lionel Renaud, Lucien Robert, and Roland Leduc.
