= Giovanni Battista Vitali =

Italian composer and violone player (1632–1692)

Giovanni Battista Vitali (18 February 1632 – 12 October 1692) was an Italian composer and violone player.

== Life and career ==
Vitali was born in Bologna and spent all of his life in the Emilian region, moving to Modena in 1674. His teacher in his early years was probably Maurizio Cazzati (1616–1678), maestro di cappella at the main church in Bologna, San Petronio Basilica from 1657 to 1671.

The first documented evidence of Vitali's musical activities appears in the records of the San Petronio orchestra for 1658, when he is listed under the title 'Violoni', referring to the cello/bass instrument that he played.

Vitali remained in the orchestra until 1673, when he took up an appointment as maestro di cappella at the chapel of the Confraternità del Rosario, Bologna. His first publication, Opus 1 (1666), tells us that he was a member of the Accademia dei Filaschisi. This musical institution, which had been established in 1633, disbanded in 1666 when most of its members joined the Accademia Filarmonica. Vitali is also listed as a member of the Accademia Filarmonica in 1666, the year of its founding. The academy archives record various details of its members, including where they came from (if not from Bologna) and their dates of birth and death. Vitali's death date is here recorded as 12 October 1692.

Vitali never reached a higher position in Bologna than that of maestro di cappella at the Santissimo Rosario. There may be several reasons for this. By the time he left Bologna and moved to Modena he had not published any vocal music and is known to have composed only two vocal works, the oratorios Agare and Il Gefte. He was also, significantly, not an organist – unlike the vast majority of maestri di cappella in Bologna during the seventeenth and eighteenth centuries. It is unlikely, therefore, that even if Vitali had stayed longer in Bologna he would have been offered the job of maestro di cappella at San Petronio, the most important musical position in the city.

In 1674 Vitali attained the position of one of two vice-maestri di cappella at the secular court of the Este family in Modena. Unlike Modena, Bologna was part of the Papal States, under the administration of Rome. The Church's influence was strong (around one hundred and fifty religious institutions at the end of the seventeenth century). Music and the theatre were evidently strongly supported and patronised by the court under Duke Francesco II (1660–1694). Here, Vitali must have witnessed a greater diversity of musical styles and genres than he had been exposed to in Bologna. The period between 1680 and 1685 saw his most productive time: he published six collections of music and was promoted to maestro di cappella in 1684. He was succeeded in this position by the opera composer Antonio Giannettini (1648–1721) in 1686. His last two publications, Artificii musicali, Opus 13 (1689), and the posthumously published Sonate da camera, Opus 14 (1692), make no mention of Vitali holding any official position, although the fact that both publications are dedicated to members of the Este family implies that he maintained links with the court.

=== As a musician ===
Vitali played a bowed stringed bass instrument but, due to the shifting terminology in use at the time, this is referred to under various names. When he joined the orchestra of the San Petronio Basilica in 1658, his name was entered in the records of the orchestra under the heading 'Violoni', paid 10 lira. However, in the records for 1664 he is referred to as 'Suonatore di Violonline [sic]'. According to Bonta, 'violonline' refers to the same instrument as 'violoncino' – which is also mentioned in the 1658 list, but with no connection to Vitali. On the title pages of the first five of Vitali's publications, he calls himself Sonatore di Violone da Brazzo or Musico di Violone da Brazzo. From his Salmi concerti, Opus 6 (1677), onwards, and in later reprints of the Opp. 1–5, after his appointment to the Modenese court, he calls himself Vice Maestro di Capella, with no reference to the instrument he played. When a description of the instruments a publication is intended for is given on the title page and includes a melodic bass instrument, the generic term 'violone' is always used.

During the time Vitali was at the San Petronio Basilica, the size of the orchestra changed relatively little: typically the records state that the orchestra consisted of three violins, two or three violas, two violoni (Vitali himself and Domenico Vincenzo Colonna) and one to two theorbos. Vitali does not appear in the records for 1674, having resigned that year and left for Modena. There seems not to have been an immediate replacement for him that year, but in 1675 Petronio Franceschini (1651–1680) was appointed and listed separately as 'violoncello' – the first documented use of this term in Bologna. The bowed bass section of the San Petronio orchestra at this point therefore comprised Colonna on violone and Franceschini on violoncello. In 1676, presumably to better distinguish between the two instruments, the term 'violone' is replaced by 'violone grosso', and Colonna is listed as playing it. The fact that this distinction in terminology was not deemed necessary earlier implies that Vitali was playing the same instrument as Colonna (the 'violone grosso', not the 'violoncello'). After Franceschini's death his position was filled by Domenico Gabrielli (1659–1690) who was among the first virtuoso cellists – so this orchestra position is now clearly reserved for a cellist.

New techniques in producing gut strings wound with metal wire took place in Bologna during the 1660s. It is probable that the wide variety of terminology in use was due in part to the experimentation with bowed bass instruments capable of producing good lower notes without the need for long string lengths due to these developments. Other terms in use at the time include the viola da spalla, a cello or smaller bowed bass instrument which was held at the shoulder and rested on the player's lap, supported by a strap Giuseppe Torelli was appointed to the cappella musicale at the San Petronio Basilica in 1686 as a player of the 'tenore viola'.

One of Vitali's few surviving unpublished works is the Partite sopra diverse sonate, for 'violone', ca. 1680. The style of the writing is much more clearly suited to the cello, which suggests that Vitali is still using 'violone' as a general term for bowed bass.

=== Bolognese academies ===
Bolognese musical life was enhanced by the existence of academies. The Accademia dei Filaschisi was formed in 1633 by Domenico Brunetti and Francesco Bertacchi and Vitali claims to be a member of this institution on the title page of his first publication, Opus 1, 1666. In this year the Accademia dei Filaschisi was disbanded, and a new academy, the Accademia Filarmonica was set up, as shown in its archives, where he is classed as compositore rather than an instrumentalist. The earliest of Vitali's own publications to state his membership in the Accademia Filarmonica was his Opus 7, (Modena, 1682). Most of his subsequent published works describe him as a member of both institutions – Accademico Filaschise, e Filarmonico, – despite the fact that the Accademia dei Filaschisi was no longer in existence.

The links between the orchestra of the San Petronio Basilica and the Accademia Filarmonica are apparent from a comparison of lists of members of both institutions. The most significant absentee from the membership of the Accademia Filarmonica is Maurizio Cazzati. The musical community of Bologna was split in the 1660s by a bitter polemic started by Lorenzo Perti, a priest at San Petronio. He identified some apparent musical errors in the Kyrie of Cazzati's Missa primi toni, which had been published in his five-part Messa e salmi, Opus 17 (1655). Giulio Cesare Arresti (1619–1701), newly installed as organist at the San Petronio Basilica, sided with Perti and was consequently dismissed in 1661. This contentious affair invites the speculation that the Accademia Filarmonica was set up specifically in opposition to Cazzati and his followers. However, Vitali publicly acknowledged Cazzati as his teacher in the letter to the reader of his Opus 1 (1666) – an unexpected gesture from one of the Accademia Filarmonica's most prominent members, if indeed hostilities were rife.

=== At the Este Court, Modena ===
As one of two vice-maestri di cappella to Duke Francesco II (the other was Giuseppe Colombi), Vitali must have been required to provide church music as well as music for various state occasions. His two published sets of vocal music date from his period at Modena (1674–1692): the Salmi concertati, Opus 6 (1677), vesper psalms in concerted style, and Hinni sacri, Opus 10 (1684), a collection of forty-nine hymns for solo voice with five-part instrumental ritornellos. There are also many vocal works from this period found in manuscript: ten sacred and secular cantatas and four oratorios, the music of two of which survives. The texts of his oratorios are either allegorical or based on the Old Testament. One cantata, Per l'Accademia della Coronatione delle Regina d'Inghilterra, was written to commemorate the coronation of Maria Beatrice, Francesco II's sister, when her husband became King James II of England.

== Works ==
=== Instrumental ===
Of the fourteen publications in Vitali's output, nine are 'da camera' dance collections (Opera 1, 3, 4, 7, 8, 11, 12 and 14), two are sacred vocal (Opera 6 and 10), and three are free or 'da chiesa' sonatas (Opera 2, 5 and 9). The remaining set, Opus 13, does not fit comfortably into these categories, being a pedagogical assembly of sixty compositions all concerning contrapuntal techniques.

The majority of the da chiesa works (thirty-six sonatas in total) are scored for two violins and organ continuo. Opus 5, however, is unusual in that it contains a variety of scorings: as well as sonatas for two violins and continuo, Vitali includes sonatas for two violins, violone and continuo and as well as sonatas for four and five parts and continuo.

=== Da camera sonatas ===
The bulk of Vitali's output consists of dance music. His last collection of dance music, and his last printed work, Sonate da camera a tre, Opus 14 (1692), was published posthumously by his son Tomaso Antonio Vitali in 1692.

Correnti, e Balletti da camera, Opus 1 (1666a), was first printed in Bologna and was reprinted four times during Vitali's lifetime. The collection contains twelve balletti and twelve correnti. The dances are all short, typically sixteen bars in length for the balletti and forty-eight bars for the correnti; in binary form.

In Vitali's next dance collection, Balletti, correnti alla francese, Opus 3 (1667), we see a greater diversity of dances: as well as pairs of balletti and correnti, there are gagliardas, a canario, a sarabanda, two sinfonias and a brando suite in several sections. The set is scored for two violins, viola and continuo but the viola part has little melodic interest and tends to fill in the harmony.

In Vitali's third set of dance music, Balletti, correnti, gighe, allemande e sarabande a violino, violone o spinetta con il secondo violino a beneplacito, Opus 4 (1668), he states on the title page that the second violin part is optional.

We find a greater variety of dance types in Opus 4 than in Vitali's previous da camera collections. There are twenty-four pieces: ballettos, allemandas, gigas, correntes, sarabandas and a rare example of a zoppa.

In Balletti, correnti e capricci per camera, Opus 8 (1683), Vitali returns to a relatively simple arrangement of paired balletti and correnti with the addition of one giga and two final movements entitled Capriccio. Each pair of balletto and corrente shares both a key and thematic material. The concluding capricci of Opus 8 are contrapuntal pieces.

The most significant point of interest in Varie Sonate Alla Francese, & all' itagliana à sei Stromenti, Opus 11 (1684), is the unusual scoring of three violins, two violas (one alto viola and one tenor viola) and continuo – although, as mentioned above, Vitali makes it clear in his preface that the middle parts can be regarded as ad lib. The thirty dance movements that make up this collection are grouped together by key. Dance types include a balletto, capriccio, introdutione, gavotta, giga, borea, zoppa, sarabanda and corrente.

The next collection of da camera sonatas, Balli in stile francese a cinque stromenti, Opus 12 (1685), is scored a quattro, for two violins, viola and continuo. The dances are grouped together according to key, not presented in pairs as is the case with Vitali's Opera 1, 3 and 8. Each suite starts with a balletto and continues with three or more dances, either giga, borea, gavotta, minuet or sarabanda. The final group presents a brando followed by four more dances.

In Vitali's last published collection, Sonate da camera a tre, due violini e violone, Opus 14 (1692), the forty-four movements, including examples of ballo, giga, borea, minuet, gavotta and zoppa, are divided into eight suites. Like Opus 8, there are thematic links between the dances in some of the suites.

The remaining collection of da camera sonatas, Varie partite del passemezo, ciaccona, capricii, e passagalli, a tre due violini, e violone, o spinetta, Opus 7 (1682), is a highly unusual set for the period, containing only dance movements employing variation technique, rather than balletti, correnti and other common dances. There are two partite, one using the chord pattern of the passamezzo moderno and the other of the passamezzo antico, a ciaconna, based on the descending tetrachord, two capriccios based on composed bass-lines, and three 'passagallos' [sic], all based on the descending tetrachord. It is very rare to find examples of these movement-types in a collection published as late as the 1680s, as they had fallen out of favour decades before, particularly the passamezzo. The music in Opus 7 is at times highly virtuosic. There is also an unusual amount of variety in each piece and extensive use of contrapuntal techniques. One technique employed is the use of simultaneous time signatures: the 'Passagallo Terzo' of Opus 7 is written with the two violin parts in C time and the bass part in 3/4 time, each phrase of the repeated chord pattern lasting twelve beats.

=== Artificii musicali ===
Artificial Musicali ne quali si contengono canon in diverse manners contrapuntal topic, inventions curious, capital e Sonate, Opus 13 (1689) is one of the most comprehensive studies of counterpoint before Bach's Die Kunst der Fuge and Musicalisches Opfer. The sixty pieces are an impressive display of contrapuntal technique for a variety of scorings, arranged in order of increasing difficulty. The collection contains canons for anything from two to twelve voices, many incorporating additional compositional devices (e.g., canon 25. Canon à 2, at the fifth above, which ascends a step on repeating). Vitali also employs similar compositional devices in the non-canonic pieces in the collection – for example, a balletto in three different meters simultaneously, a passacaglia which modulates from E-flat major to E major through the cycle of fifths, and another Balletto for two treble instruments which has one line written in G and the other in F.

=== Da chiesa sonatas ===
Vitali's first collection of 'da chiesa' sonatas, Sonate a due violini col suo Basso continuo per l'organo, Opus 2 (1667), consists of twelve short, three or four-movement works. Vitali uses a few basic movement types: the fast fugal movement in duple metre; the fast contrapuntal movement in triple metre with use of dance rhythms; and the slow homophonic movement in duple metre. Like the sonatas of his teacher Cazzati, Vitali's Opus 2 sonatas use the model of the monothematic canzona but with some freedom and a greater inclination towards contrapuntal devices such as countersubjects, antiphonal effects and stretto.

In these sonatas the texture consists predominantly of two melodic lines, either homophonic or contrapuntal, over a supporting basso continuo line. The bass part primarily provides harmonic support, although it does occasionally participate in the contrapuntal interplay. Notable features in Opus 2 are the running or walking bass, which anticipates Arcangelo Corelli's Opus 1 (1681), and the use of chromatic themes.

Vitali's second collection of da chiesa was Sonate a due, trè, quattro, e cinque stromenti, Opus 5 (1669). The sonatas in Opus 5 are divided into sonate a due (sonatas no. 1-5, standard trio sonatas for two violins and organ continuo), sonate a tre (sonata nos. 6-9, adding an independent violone part), sonate a quattro (sonata nos. 10 and 11, adding alto viola) and a sonata a cinque (sonata no. 12, for two violins, alto and tenor violas, violone and organ continuo). The sonatas in Opus 5 are all given individual titles, and these titles are in effect dedications to Bolognese 'Signori' or senators.

In Vitali's last book, Sonate da chiesa a due violini, Opus 9 (1684), the twelve sonatas are more consistent in terms of number and type of movements than those of Opera 2 and 5. Many of the sonatas expanded to six movements which are often linked thematically. Contrapuntal textures are more complicated than those of the earlier collections. In this opus, the continuo part does not on the whole contribute thematically – the contrapuntal interplay in the fugal movements is largely confined to the two violin parts, as in the sonatas of Opus 2 and those sonatas in Opus 5 without an independent bowed bass part. Opus 9 contains more passages of chromaticism than his previous da chiesa collections.

== Selected discography ==
- Giovanni Battista Vitali, Vespers 1677 (Domine ad adiuvandum, Dixit Dominus, Confitebor, Beatus vir (2 versions), Laudate pueri, Laudate Dominum, Iste confessor (4 versions), Magnificat, Quia vidisti me Thoma), I Madrigalisti Estensi, Michele Gaddi; Novantiqua 2021
- Giovanni Battista Vitali: Sonatas Op. XI. Performed by Luigi Cozzolino (violin) and Semperconsort, with excellent liner notes by Carlo Vitali. Released in 2010. Brilliant Classics 93976
- Giovanni Battista Vitali: Triosonatas Op. 2. Performed by Luigi Cozzolino (violin), Anna Noferini (violin), Gianluca Lastraioli (theorbo and guitar), Gabriele Micheli (organ and harpsichord), with excellent liner notes by Carlo Vitali. Released in 2012. Brilliant Classics 94405
- Giovanni Battista Vitali: Sonate da camera op. 14 (1692). Performed by Italico Splendore. Booklet notes by Micol Vitali. Released in 2020. Tactus TC 632202
- Giovanni Battista Vitali: Partite sopra diverse Sonate, Arranged for Solo Viola by Marco Misciagna. Performed by Marco Misciagna (viola). Released in 2026. MM36
