= Francesco Venturini =

- Born: Bruxelles, Belgio

Francesco Venturini (c. 1675 - April 18, 1745, Hanover) was a Baroque musician and composer of unclear origin, despite his Italian-sounding name. There is some evidence suggesting that he originated from present-day Belgium because his sons are recorded in the baptismal register as "Bruxellensis" (= from Brussels).

In 1698 Francesco Venturini became a violinist in the court chapel of Electorate of Hanover, where he had married the previous year. In 1714, Venturini was named Kapellmeister, head of the court orchestra, in Hanover. He held this post until his death.

Venturini was a renowned composer in his time. He created chamber music, concerts and other works essentially in the suite form. His Concertos Op. 1 were printed 1715 by Estienne Roger in Amsterdam and are his only known published works.
