= Flonzaley Quartet =

Defunct American string quartet

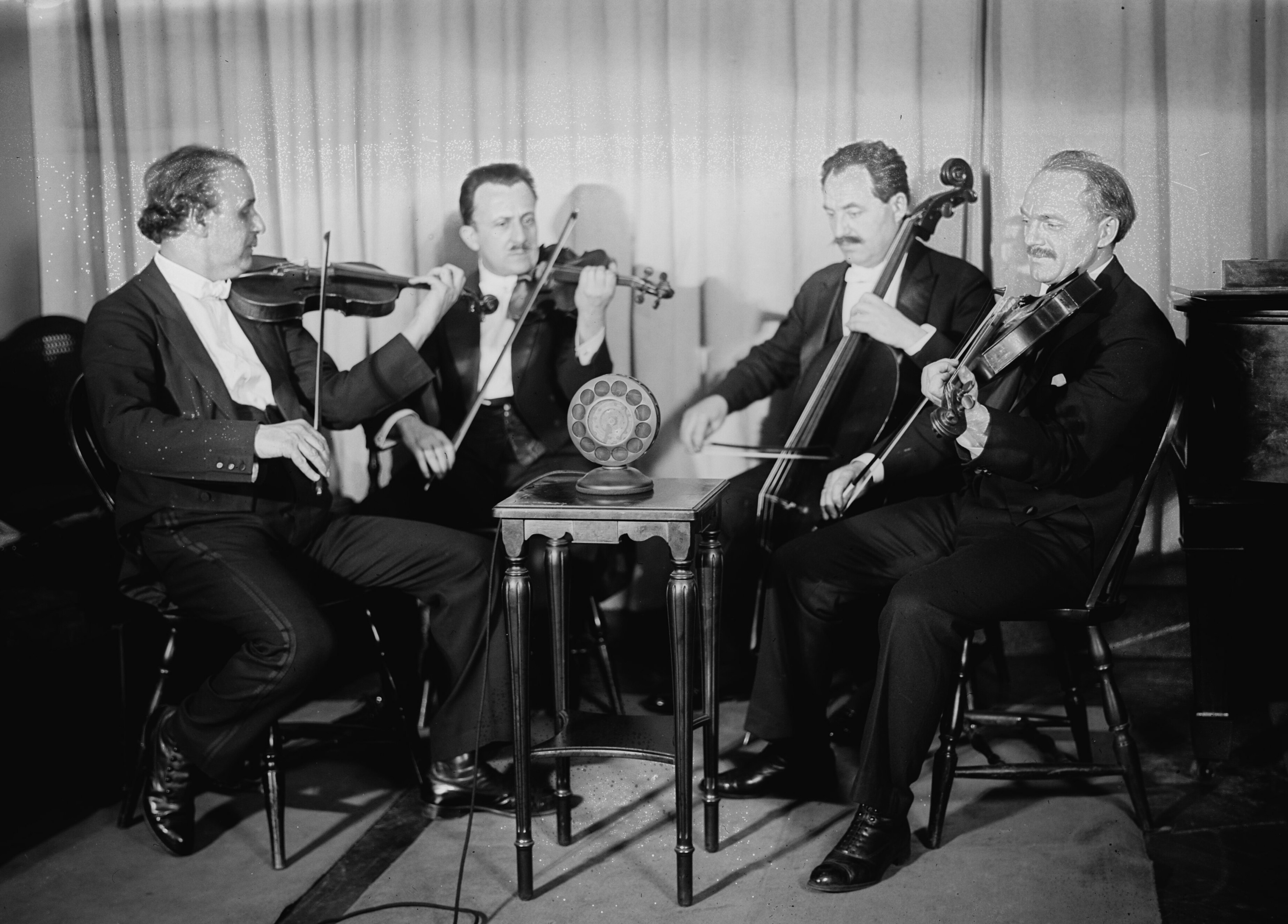

The Flonzaley Quartet in 1918

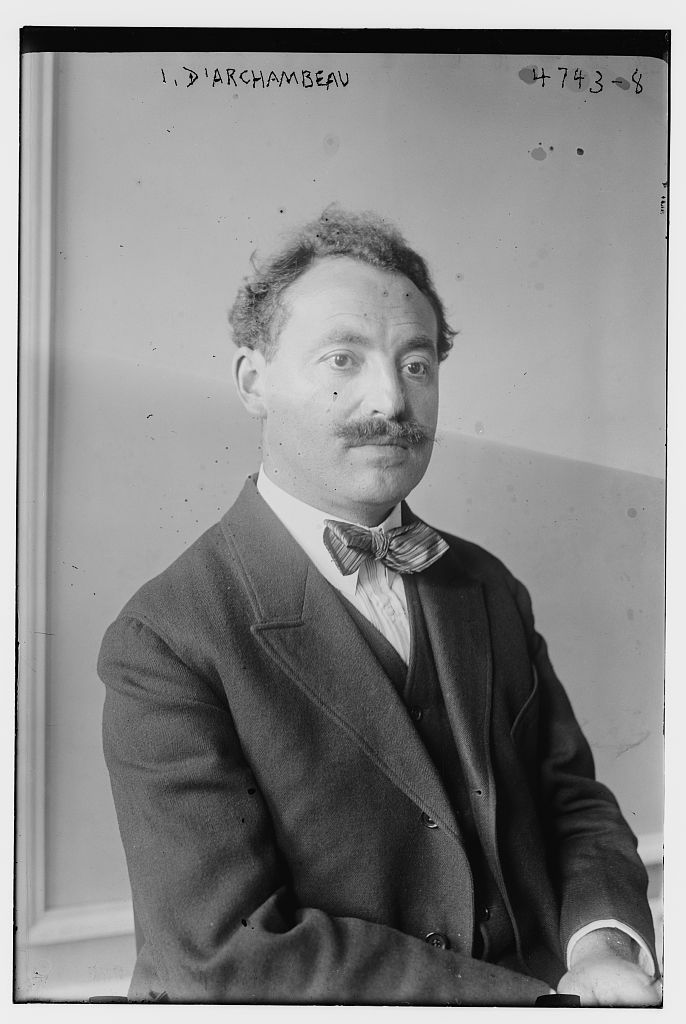
Iwan d'Archambeau

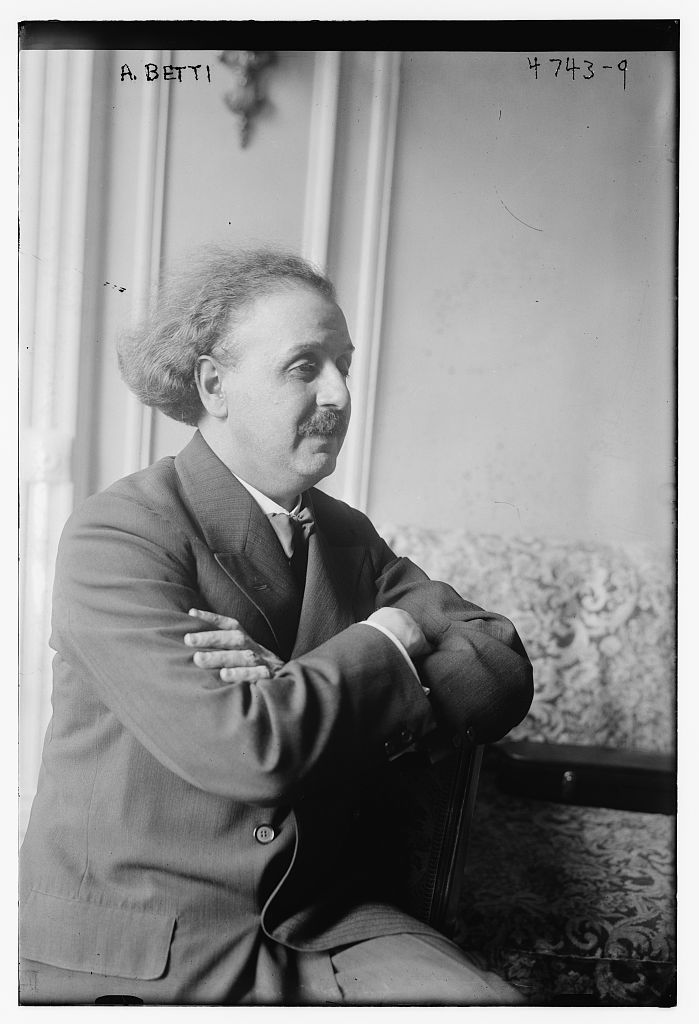
Adolfo Betti

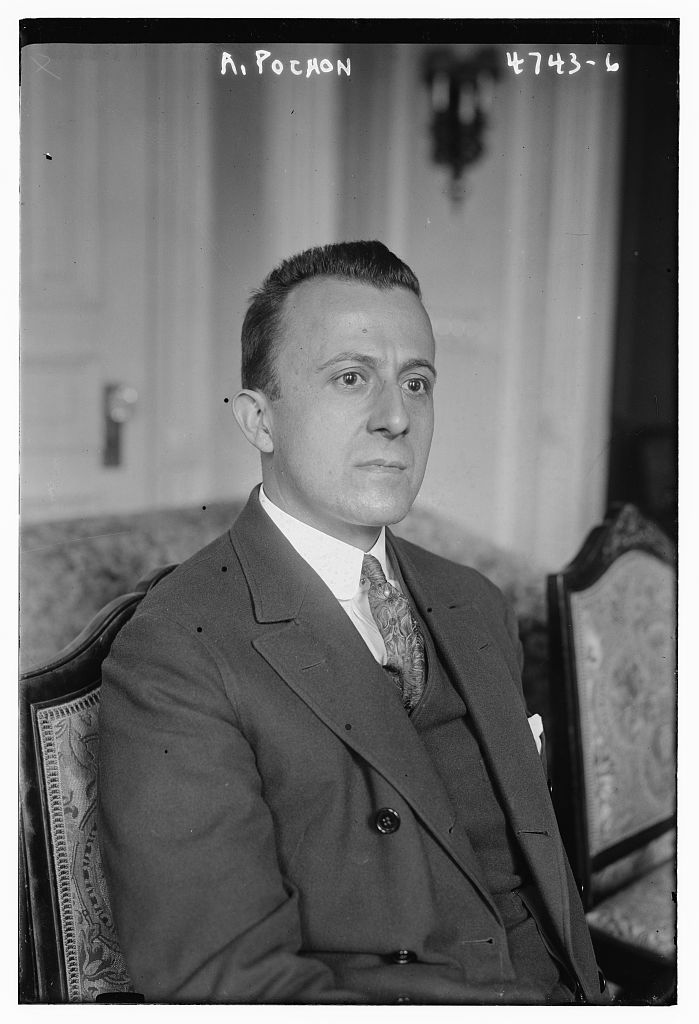
Alfred Pochon

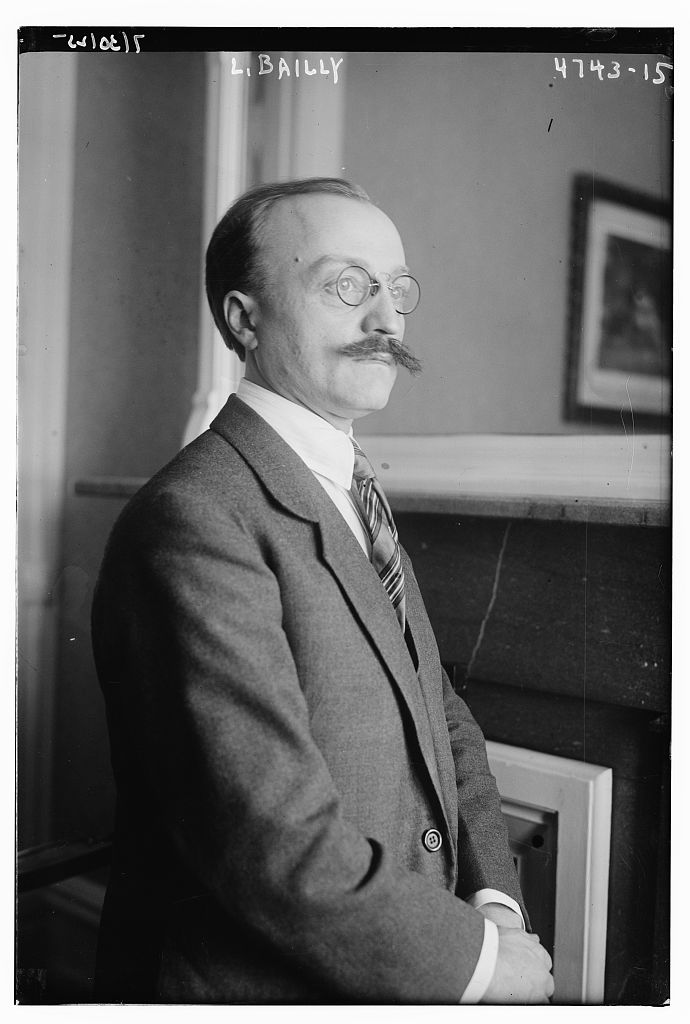
Louis Bailly

The Flonzaley Quartet was a string quartet organized in Manhattan, New York City, in 1902. The group disbanded in 1929.

== Personnel ==
The personnel of the group were as follows:

- 1st violin: Adolfo Betti (Bagni di Lucca, 21 March 1875 – Lucca, 2 December 1950).
- 2nd violin: Alfred Pochon (Yverdon, 30 July 1878 – Lutry, 26 February 1959).
- viola: Ugo Ara (Venezia, 1876 – Lausanne, 1 December 1936), until 1917; replaced by Louis Bailly (Valenciennes, 13 June 1882 – Cowansville, Québec, 21 November 1974), until 1924; by Félicien d'Archambeau (? – ?), until 1925; by Nicolas Moldavan (Kremenetz, 23 January 1891 – New York, 21 September 1974), until disbanding in 1928.
- violoncello: Iwan d'Archambeau (Herve, 1879 – Villefranche-sur-Mer, 29 December 1955).

Violinist Frank Howell Holden frequently played with the group.

== History ==
The quartet was the creation of Edward J. de Coppet of New York, who in 1903 engaged the original members to devote themselves entirely to quartet-playing, and not with any view to giving regular concerts in public. The group took its name from de Coppet's summer villa near Lausanne, in Switzerland, where the four musicians first rehearsed. After a long period of practice, the Quartet made a European tour and won high praise for the perfection of its ensemble and its artistic finish. Both violinists and the violist had been students of the Belgian maestro César Thomson, who would also teach members of a contemporaneous pioneering American chamber group, the Zoellner Quartet. The group was first heard in New York, in private and at charity concerts, in autumn 1904, but it did not give a public concert in the United States until 5 December 1905. After that it appeared regularly in Europe and America. The members stuck to the original principle of not accepting any outside engagement, and having no pupils, and by devoting themselves entirely to the quartet maintained a position of acknowledged superiority in their field.

In 1914 the group asked Igor Stravinsky to write them a work. This resulted in his "Three pieces for String Quartet". A few years later they also commissioned him to write "Concertino", a one-movement work. Éduard de Coppet died in 1916, and his son André continued thereafter to maintain the Quartet. The original violist Ugo Ara left the group to join the Italian army, resulting in his replacement. The Quartet performed worldwide until disbanding in 1929.

One of their final public concerts was at The Town Hall in Manhattan, New York City, on March 17, 1929. They broadcast their farewell concert over station WEAF (now WFAN) on May 7, 1929.

== Legacy ==
Their recording of the Haydn 'Lark' quartet (below) could still be described as 'in prep.' in 1936.

== Recordings ==
From 1913 until 1929, The Flonzaley made several acoustic and electrical recordings for the Victor Talking Machine Company. Among their recordings of longer works are the following:

- Beethoven: Quartet Op 18 no 2 (V 1218–21/DA 851–854).
- Beethoven: Quartet in E flat major op 127 (V 7629–33/DB 1377–81).
- Beethoven: Quartet in F major op 135 (V 122–125/DA 847–850).
- Brahms: Quintet in F minor op 34 with Harold Bauer, piano (V 6571–5/DB970-4).
- Dohnányi: Quartet no 2 in D flat major op 15 (V 7354–6/DB 1135–7).
- Haydn: Quartet in D major op 64 no 5 (V 7650–1).
- Mozart: Quartet in D minor K 421 (V 7607–8/DB 1357-8).
- Mozart: Quartet in D major K 575 (DA 947–9 ('V 1585–7' not issued?)).
- Schubert: Quartet in G major op 161 (V 7475–8/DB 1373–6).
- Schumann: Quintet in E flat major op 44 with Ossip Gabrilowitsch, piano (V 8092–5/DB 1191–4).
- Smetana: Quartet no 1 in E minor (V 7130–2/DB 1359–61).
