= Mercantile Bank Building (Jonesboro, Arkansas) =

- U.S. National Register of Historic Places
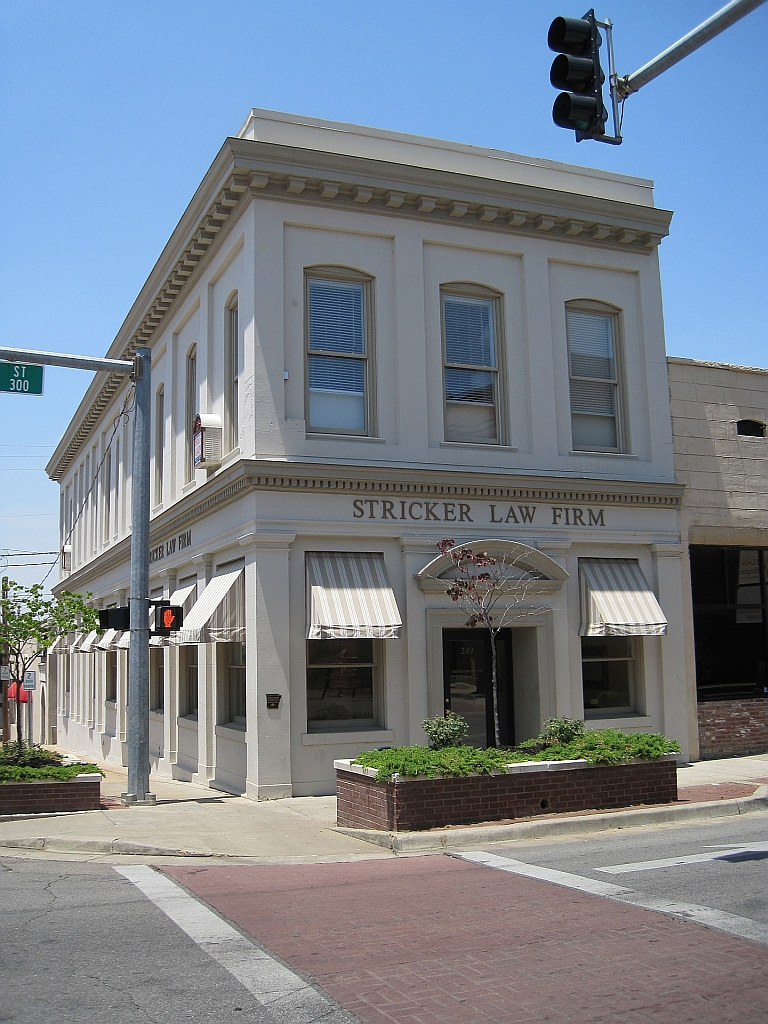

- Location within Arkansas
- Location: 249 S. Main St., Jonesboro, Arkansas
- Coordinates: 35.84044°N 90.70515°W
- Area: less than one acre
- Built: 1890
- Architect: Hoggson Brothers (1919 update)
- Architectural style: Classical Revival
- NRHP reference No.: 04001506
- Added to NRHP: January 20, 2005

The Mercantile Bank Building is a historic bank building at 249 South Main Street in Jonesboro, Arkansas. The brick building was built in 1890 for Craighead County Bank. The bank used the building until 1894. It was then used as a clothing store and for offices afterwards until 1901 when it was occupied by Jonesboro Savings & Trust, (later known as the Jonesboro Trust Company). The architectural firm of Hoggson Brothers conducted a 1919 update and remodel of the building. Jonesboro bank closed in 1931 and, after fundraising efforts to open a new bank in the town, Mercantile Bank opened in the building in 1932. Mercantile moved its bank in 1969 and Crowley's Ridge Development Council used the building until 2004.

The building was listed on the National Register of Historic Places in 2005.

== See also ==
- National Register of Historic Places listings in Craighead County, Arkansas
