= Alfred Pochon =

Swiss musician (1878–1959)

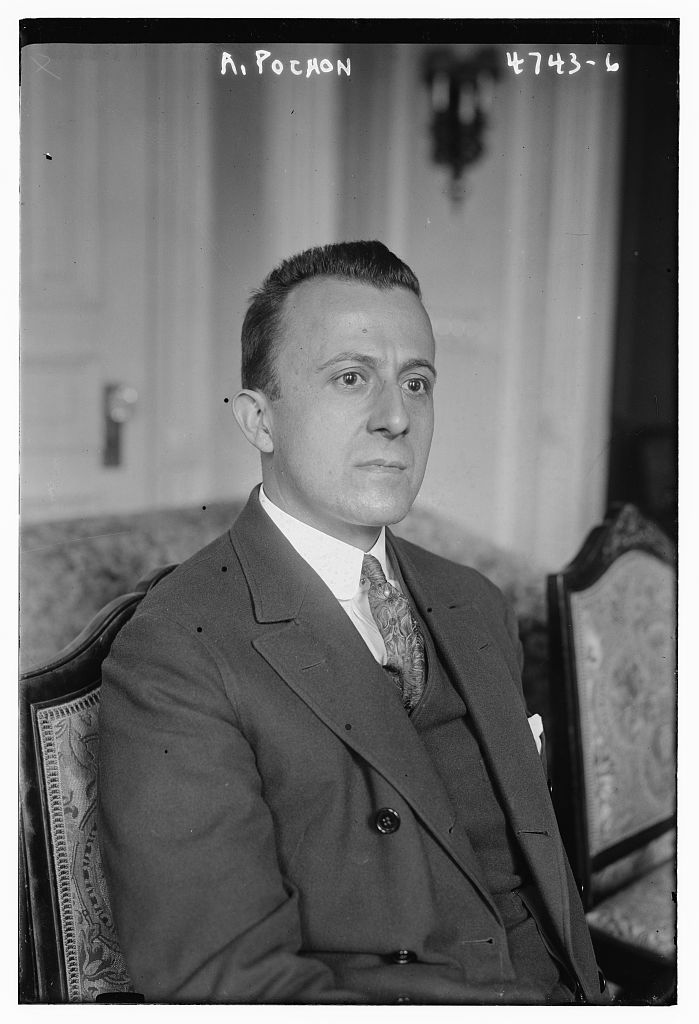

Personal details
- Born: 30 July 1878 Yverdon-les-Bains, Switzerland
- Died: 26 February 1959 (aged 80) Lutry, Switzerland

Alfred Pochon (30 July 1878 – 26 February 1959) was a Swiss musician.

== Biography ==
He was born on 30 July 1878 in Yverdon-les-Bains, Switzerland.

It was in his hometown Yverdon that at the age of seven, Pochon first began learning the violin before following the teachings of Louis Rey in Geneva, Switzerland, at the age of eleven. Pochon's father was a businessman and his mother had a predisposition for the piano and painting. At fourteen he decided to go for a musical career. He then left for Belgium in 1895 and enrolled at the Conservatoire de Liège, with the famous violinist César Thomson, who taught him the art of violin and especially that of the string quartet. Pochon obtained his diploma as well as a first prize in playing the in 1897.

He gave one of his first concerts as a soloist at the Casino de Saint-Pierre in Geneva in 1889. He played successfully Septième Concerto de Louis Spohr. Alfred Pochon in 1890 was already in the ranks of violinists in the orchestra of "Classical Concerts" in Geneva, led by Hugo de Senger. It also takes the first violin in the orchestra desk Eugène Ysaÿe, founded and directed by the latter in Brussels. In 1901, he left Belgium to Vienna before discovering the United States .

In 1903 Pochon founded, with the financial support of his friend the banker Edward J. de Coppet, the Flonzaley Quartet in Manhattan, New York City. The quartet made the travel to Europe, North America and Cuba. In 1922, Pochon moved to Lutry. It was here that from now on, the members of the quartet met. In May 1929, after the cessation of the activity of the Flonzaley Quartet, Pochon created with Nicolas Moldavan the Stradivarius Quartet with which he toured nine years. In 1941, he became the director of the Lausanne Conservatory, a position he held until 1957. In 1944, he created the musical Gazette of the Lausanne Conservatory.

Alfred Pochon died, after a long illness, on 26 February 1959 on his property in Lutry, Switzerland.
