= Noble Foster Hoggson =

American architect

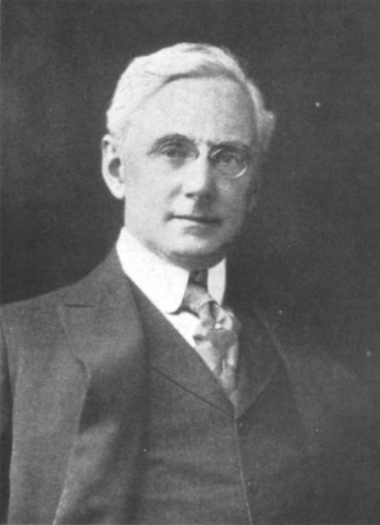
- Born: August 27, 1865; New Haven, Connecticut
- Died: October 25, 1939 (aged 74); Troy, New York
- Education: Yale University
- Occupation(s): Builder, architect, writer
- Children: Noble Foster Hoggson Jr.

Noble Foster Hoggson Sr. (1865–1939) was a builder, architect, and author in the United States. He specialized in building and planning banks in New York City. He partnered with his brother William J. Hoggson to establish Hoggson Brothers. His son, Noble Foster Hoggson Jr., was a prominent landscape architect.

== Biography ==
Hoggson was born in New Haven, Connecticut on August 27, 1865, to Samuel J. Hoggson and Luey (McLean) Hoggson. His father was from Glasgow, Scotland and was an engraver and die maker.

Hoggson graduated from Yale in 1888 and then continued his studies of architecture in Europe. Hoggson worked at Charles Wellford Leavitt's firm. He established Hoggson Brothers Builders in 1889 and incorporated it in 1907. His brother was the architect William J. Hoggson who, apart from their partnership, worked in Greenwich, Connecticut and Florida.

Hoggson was in charge of a 1916 remodel of the Mercantile Bank building in Jonesboro, Arkansas. He wrote articles on bank building as well as on World War I, having worked in France for the American Industrial Commission to France surveying the destruction and determining how the U.S. could assist in the rebuilding effort. He was also involved as an architect with the University Club of Albany. Hoggson was a strong proponent of an international survey of architecture to aid American contractors seeking to work abroad.

He authored: Just Behind the Front in France (1918) Banking through the ages (1926), published in New York by Dodd, Mead & Company, The Gradual Development of State Banking (1927) and Epochs in American Banking (1929).

His son was Noble Foster Hoggson Jr. (July 8, 1899 – October 29, 1970), a landscape architect who also authored a biography of railroad tycoon Horace Chapin Henry. He was a consultant to Seattle's Washington Park Arboretum. The University of Washington Libraries Department of Special Collections maintains the Noble Foster Hoggson Papers, 1916–1941.

Noble Foster Hoggson Sr. died at the Yale Club in Troy, New York on October 25, 1939.

== Hoggson Jr.'s landscape architecture ==
- Art Institute of Seattle, Seattle, WA – 1932–1933 (3303)
- Claude Bekins House, The Highlands, Seattle, WA – 1966–1969 (8607)
- Bloedel Reserve, Bainbridge Island, WA – 1954–1985 (3318)
- Maurice Dunn House, The Highlands, Seattle, WA – 1949 (8606)
- Garrett House, The Highlands, Seattle, WA – 1936 (14757)
- Hoggson House, The Highlands, Seattle, WA – 1966 (7667)
- National Park Service, Mount Rainier National Park, WA – (7606)
- United States Government, Department of the Interior, National Park Service (NPS), Lassen Volcanic National Park, Mineral, CA – (8603)
- United States Navy (USN), Naval Air Station, Housing Project, Sand Point, Seattle, WA – 1943 (8605)
- University of Washington, Seattle (UW), Washington Park Arboretum, Seattle, WA – 1934–1936 (5408)
