= Mercantile Bank building (Tampa, Florida) =

Modernist building in Tampa, Florida

Coordinates: 27°56′48.5″N 82°27′36″W

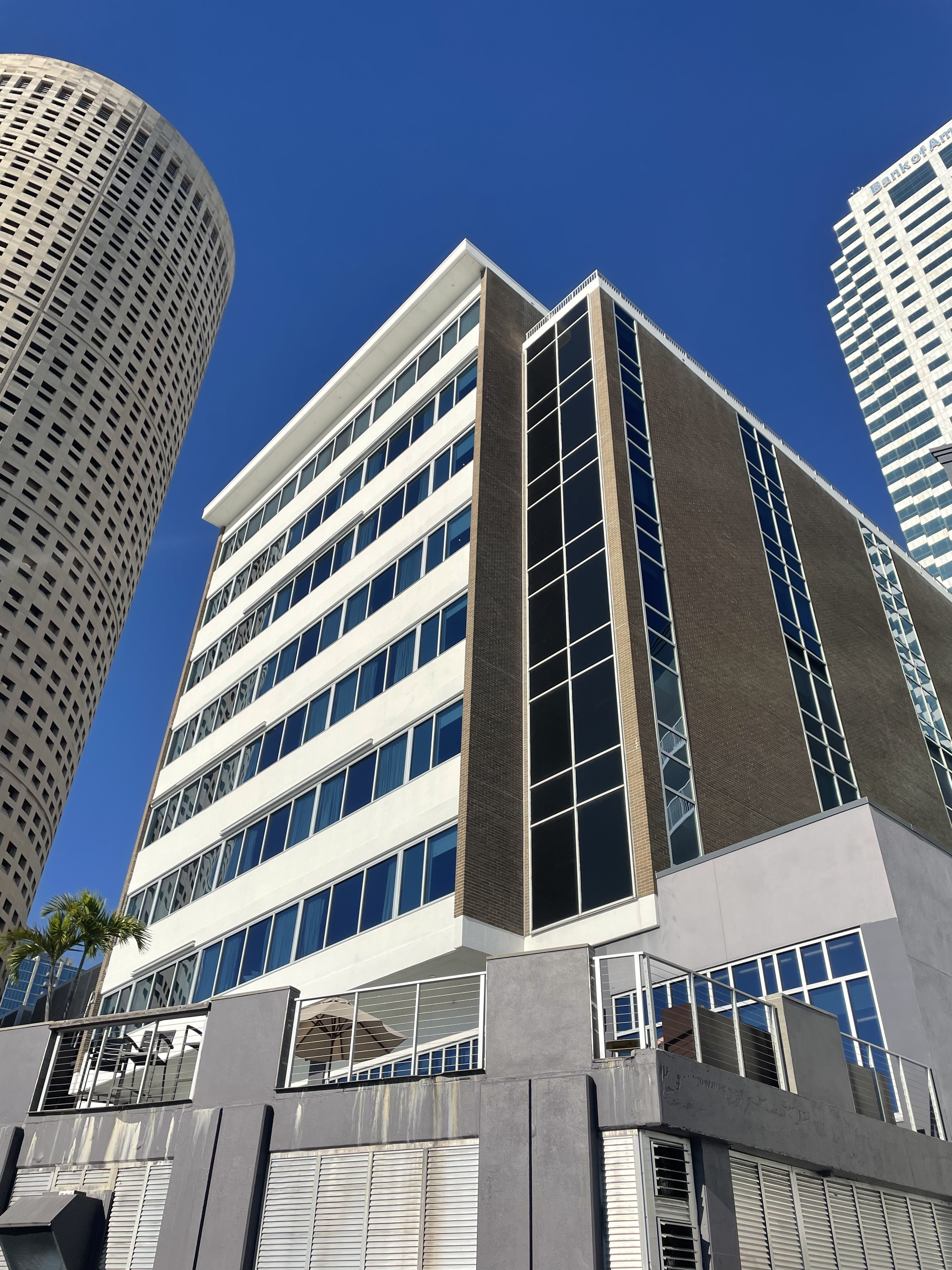
Mercantile Bank building

The Mercantile Bank building is an example of modern architecture located in Tampa, Florida. The building is located at 100 West Kennedy Boulevard and overlooks the Hillsborough River including an unobstructed view of the Tampa Bay Hotel building that is now part of the University of Tampa. In 2012 it was purchased for a planned remodelling to adapt it for use as a boutique hotel. The design is for 120 rooms. It opened as an Aloft Hotel in 2014.

== History ==
Constructed in 1964, the Mercantile Bank building has eight floors and is approximately 113 feet high.
