= Tomaso Antonio Vitali =

Italian composer and violinist

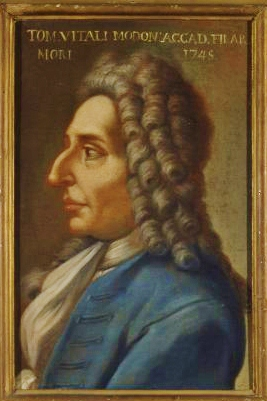
- Portrait of Vitali from the second half of the 18th century by an unknown Emilian painter
- Born: Tomaso Antonio Vitali; 7 March 1663; Bologna, Papal States
- Died: 9 May 1745 (aged 82); Modena, Italy
- Occupations: Composer; violinist

Tomaso Antonio Vitali (7 March 1663 – 9 May 1745) was an Italian composer and violinist of the mid to late Baroque era. The eldest son of Giovanni Battista Vitali, he is chiefly known for a Chaconne in G minor for violin and continuo, to which he is traditionally attributed as the composer. The earliest known source for Vitali's Chaconne is a manuscript housed in the Sächsische Landesbibliothek Dresden with the shelfmark Mus. 2037/R/1. The work's wide-ranging modulations into distant keys have raised speculation that it could not be a genuine Baroque work, while the lack of similarities to other works by Vitali have made modern scholars cast serious doubts on the attribution.

== Biography ==
Vitali was born in Bologna on 7 March 1663; his father was the noted composer and violinist Giovanni Battista Vitali. He studied composition in Modena with Antonio Maria Pacchioni, and was employed at the Este court orchestra from 1675 to 1742. He was a teacher, whose pupils included Evaristo Felice dall'Abaco, Jean Baptiste Senaillé, Girolamo Nicolò Laurenti and Luca Antonio Predieri.

Authentic works by Vitali include a set of trio sonatas published as his opus numbers 1 and 2 (1693), sonatas da camera (chamber sonatas), and violin sonatas (including his opus 6) among other works. Among those that have been recorded include all of the op. 1 (on Naxos 8.570182), three of the violin sonatas (on the Swiss label Gallo), and some of the sonatas from the opp. 2 and 4 sets (opus 4, no. 12 on Classica CL 101 from Finland.)

He died at Modena on 9 May 1745.

== The chaconne ==
A chaconne is a musical form used as a vehicle for variation on a repeated short harmonic progression over a ground bass. The earliest known source for Vitali's Chaconne is a manuscript housed in the Sächsische Landesbibliothek Dresden with the shelfmark Mus. 2037/R/1. It has been identified as being in the hand of Johann Gottfried Grundig or Johann Jacob Lindner, copyists who worked at the Dresden Hofkapelle, and is dated ca.1730–40, which lends credit to its authenticity. The Chaconne was marked by the copyist, at the time of transcription, in the upper margin of the first page of the Dresden manuscript as "Parte del Tomaso Vitalino" (Tomaso Vitalino's part), who may or may not be Vitali. One striking feature of the "Vitali" Chaconne's style is the way it wildly changes key, reaching the far-flung territories of B♭ minor and E♭ minor, modulations uncharacteristic of the Baroque era, as change of key signature became typical only in Romanticism. However, precedents exist in violin works of the 17th century. Especially relevant to Tomaso Vitali's Chaconne are the works of his father, Giovanni Battista, most significantly Passagallo che principia per B. molle, e finisce per Diesis, and Balletto à due ... che il Violino sona per B. molle, e il Violone sona per diesis. Striking examples of enharmonic modulation also exist in Georg Muffat's violin sonata of 1677.

Despite musicological doubts, the piece is ever popular amongst violinists. For example, Jascha Heifetz chose it, in a "very much arranged and altered version", with organ accompaniment, to open his American debut in Carnegie Hall in 1917. Arrangements of it exist for violin and piano by Ferdinand David and by Léopold Charlier, for violin and organ, for violin and orchestra by Ottorino Respighi, and there are transcriptions of it for viola and piano by Friedrich Hermann (1828-1907) and for cello and piano by Luigi Silva.

== Selected discography ==
- Tomaso Antonio Vitali: Twelve Trio Sonatas Op. 1. Performed by Luigi Cozzolino (violin), Luca Giardini (violin), Bettina Hoffmann (cello), Gianluca Lastraioli (theorbo and guitar), Andrea Perugi (organ and harpsichord). Released in 2006. Naxos 8.570182

== Sources ==
- Greich, Wolfgang (1970). "Sein oder nicht sein? Nochmals zur 'Chaconne von Vitali'". Die Musikforschung (in German). 23 (1): 39–41. JSTOR 41116504.
- Suess, John G. (2001). "Vitali family". Grove Music Online. Oxford: Oxford University Press. doi:10.1093/gmo/9781561592630.article.29523. ISBN 978-1-56159-263-0. (subscription, Wikilibrary access, or UK public library membership required)
