= List of composers for lute =

This is a list of composers who wrote for lute and similar period instruments: theorbo, chitarrone, vihuela etc. Composers who worked outside of their country of origin are listed according to where they were most active, i.e. German-born Johannes Hieronymus Kapsberger is listed under Italy. Within sections, the order is alphabetical by surname (or, in cases of, for example, Pietrobono and Lorenzino, by first name).

== Renaissance and Baroque ==
=== Italy ===
==== Late 15th century to mid-16th century ====
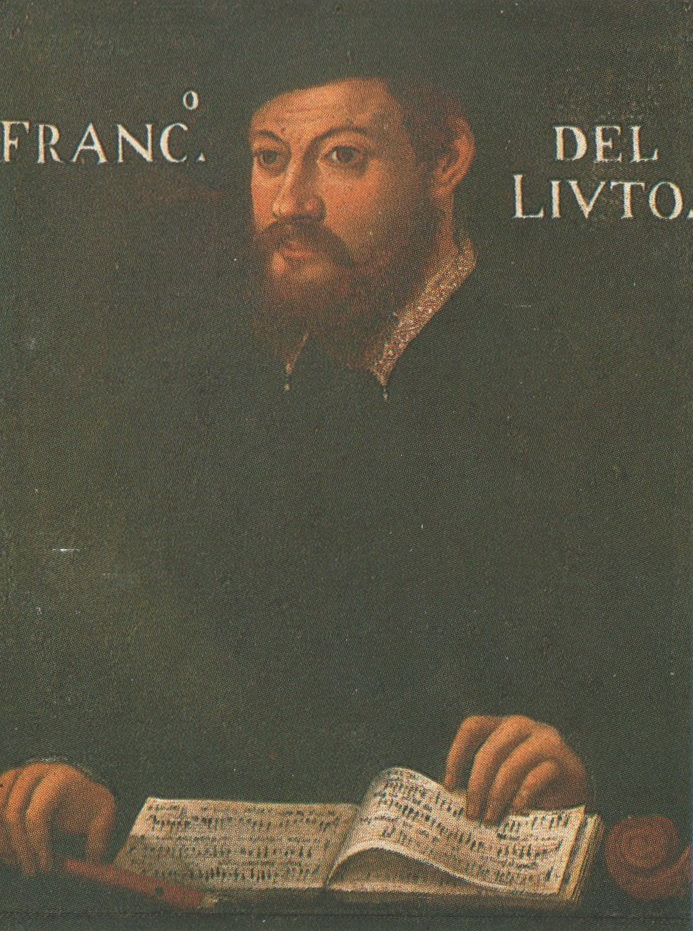
Francesco Canova da Milano, 1497–1543

- Giovanni Maria Alemanni (fl. 1500–1525, no compositions survive)
- Pietro Paolo Borrono (c. 1490–1563)
- Franciscus Bossinensis (fl. 1510)
- Vincenzo Capirola (1474 – after 1548)
- Marco Dall'Aquila (c. 1480 – after 1538)
- Joan Ambrosio Dalza (fl. 1508)
- Francesco Canova da Milano (1497–1543)
- Francesco Spinacino (fl. 1507)
- Giovanni Angelo Testagrossa (1470–1530, no compositions survive)

==== Mid 16th–17th centuries ====
- Bellerofonte Castaldi (1580–1649)
- Francesco Corbetta (c.1615–1681), composer for Baroque guitar
- Fabrizio Dentice (c.1539–1581)
- The Galilei family:
  - Vincenzo Galilei (late 1520s – 1591)
  - Michelagnolo Galilei (1575–1631), his son
- Johannes Hieronymus Kapsberger (c.1580–1651, of German descent)
- Simone Molinaro (c.1570 – after 1633)
- Alessandro Piccinini (1566–1638)
- Giovanni Zamboni (fl. second half of the 17th century)

==== Late 17th–18th centuries ====
- Francesco Bartolomeo Conti
- Ludovico Roncalli (1654–1713)
- Antonio Vivaldi (1678–1741)

=== France ===
- Pierre Attaingnant (c.1494 – c.1551, publisher, possibly composer)
- Robert Ballard (1575–1649)
- Julien Belin (c.1525/30–1584)
- Jean-Baptiste Besard (c.1567 – after 1616)
- Pierre Blondeau (fl. 1st half of the 16th century, treasurer, possibly composer)
- Mlle Bocquet (fl. 1st half of the 17th century)
- François de Chancy (1600–1656)
- François Dufaut (before 1604 – before 1672)
- Jacques Gallot (died c. 1690)
- The Gaultier family:
  - Denis Gaultier (1597/1603–1672)
  - Ennemond Gaultier (1575–1651), his cousin
- Jacques Gautier (Gaultier) (fl. 1st half of the 17th century, died before 1660)
- Pierre Gautier (Gaultier) (1599 – after 1638, active in Italy)
- René Mesangeau (fl. 1567–1638)
- Germain Pinel (c. 1600–1664)
- Guillaume Morlaye (born c. 1510)
- Charles Mouton (1617–1699)
- Jean-Paul Paladin (died before September 1565, Italian-born)
- Julien Perrichon (1566 – c. 1600)
- Jakub Reys (c.1550 – c.1605, Polish-born)
- Albert de Rippe (1500–1551, Italian-born)
- Adrian Le Roy (c.1520–1598)
- Robert de Visée (c.1655–1732/3)

=== Spain ===
- Esteban Daza (c.1537 – 1591/6)
- Miguel de Fuenllana (fl. 1553–1578)
- Francisco Guerau (1649–1722, composed for Baroque guitar)
- Luys Milan (c.1500 – after 1560)
- Alonso de Mudarra (c.1510–1580)
- Santiago de Murcia (c.1682 – c.1740, moved to Mexico, composed for Baroque guitar)
- Luys de Narváez (fl. 1526–49)
- Diego Pisador (1509/10 – after 1557)
- Lucas Ruiz de Ribayaz (born probably before 1650, composed for Baroque guitar)
- Gaspar Sanz (mid-17th century–early 18th century, composed for Baroque guitar)
- Enríquez de Valderrábano (fl. 1547)

=== England ===
- Daniel Bacheler (1572–1619)
- Thomas Campion (1567–1620)
- Francis Cutting (c.1550 – c.1596)
- John Danyel (1564 – c.1626)
- The Dowland family:
  - John Dowland (1563–1626)
  - Robert Dowland (1591–1641)
- Alfonso Ferrabosco the elder (1543–1588, Italian-born)
- Cuthbert Hely (fl. 1620–1640)
- Anthony Holborne (c. 1545–1602)
- The Johnson family:
  - John Johnson (c. 1545–1594)
  - Robert Johnson (c. 1580–1634)
- Robert Jones (fl. 1597–1615)
- Peter Philips (c. 1560–1628)
- Thomas Robinson (fl. 1589–1609)
- Philip Rosseter (1567/8–1623)

=== Netherlands/Belgium ===
- Emanuel Adriaenssen (c.1554–1604)
- Joachim van den Hove (1567–1620)
- Constantijn Huygens (1596–1687, no compositions survive)
- Philips van Marnix van Sint-Aldegonde (1540–1598, no compositions survive)
- Johannes Matelart (1538-1607)
- Josquin des Prez (c. 1450–1521)
- Jacques de Saint-Luc (1616–c.1710, worked in Paris, Vienna, etc.)
- Nicolas Vallet (c. 1583 – after 1642, French-born)
- Philip van Wilder (c. 1500 – 1554)

=== Germany/Austria ===
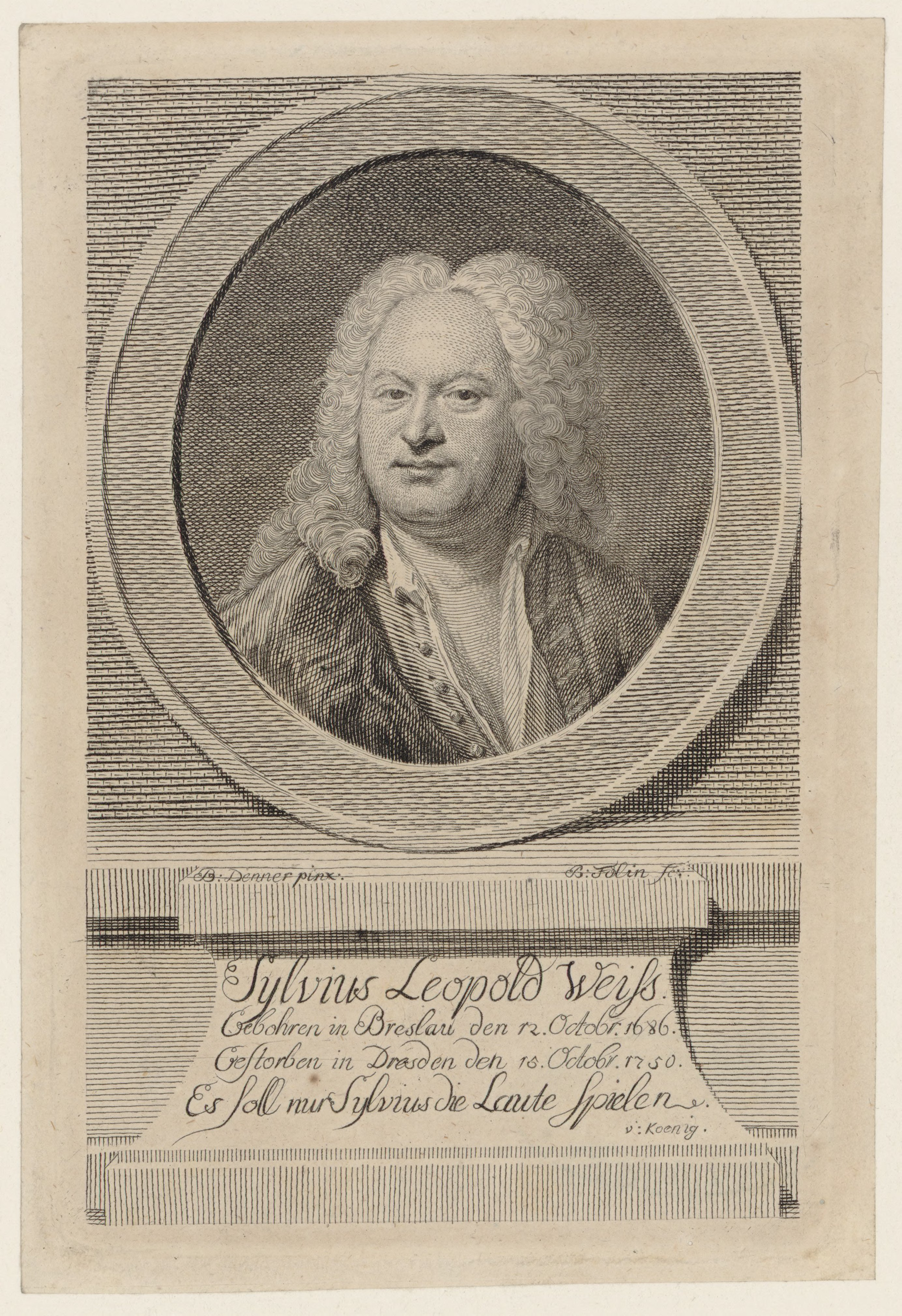
Sylvius Leopold Weiß, 1687–1750

- Johann Sebastian Bach (1685–1750)
- Jacques Bittner (fl. 1680)
- Ernst Gottlieb Baron (1696–1760)
- Adam Falckenhagen (1697–1754)
- Bernhard Joachim Hagen (1720–1787)
- Hans Gerle (c.1500 – 1570)
- Hans Judenkünig (c. 1445/50–1526)
- David Kellner (1670–1748)
- Karl Kohaut (1726–1784)
- Johann Kropfgans (1708-1770)
- Wolff Jakob Lauffensteiner (1676–1754)
- Elias Mertel (c.1561 – 1626)
- Hans Neusidler (c.1508/09 – 1563)
- Esaias Reusner (17th century)
- Sebastian Anton Scherer (1631–1712, no lute compositions survive)
- Arnolt Schlick (c. 1460 – after 1521)
- Silvius Leopold Weiss (1686–1750)

=== Other countries ===
- Bálint Bakfark (Hungary, c.1526/30 – 1576)
- Diomedes Cato (Italy, 1560/65 – after 1607 or 1618, active in Poland)
- Wojciech Dlugoraj (Poland, 1557/8 – c.1619)
- Jan Antonín Losy (Bohemia, c.1643–1721)

== 20th and 21st centuries ==
- Dušan Bogdanović (US and Serbia)
- Johann Nepomuk David (Germany)
- Alexandre Danilevsky (France and Russia)
- Vladimir Vavilov (Russia)
- Paulo Galvão (Portugal)
- Jacopo Gianninoto (Italy)
- Sandor Kallos (Ukraine and Russia)
- Ronn McFarlane (US)
- Robert MacKillop (Scotland)
- Toyohiko Satoh (Japan and Netherlands)
- Roman Turovsky-Savchuk (US and Ukraine)
- Jozef van Wissem (US/The Netherlands)
- Andrei Krylov (Canada and Russia)
