= List of composers for lute (nationality) =

Below is a list of composers of lute music, ordered by nationality.

== Bohemia ==
- Johann Anton Logy (1650–1721)

== France ==
- Guillaume de Morlaye (c.1510–c.1558)
- Adrian Le Roy (c.1520–1598)
- Julien Perrichon (1566–c.1600)
- Jean-Baptiste Besard (c.1567–after 1616)
- René Mesangeau (c. 1567–1638)
- Robert Ballard (c.1572–after 1650)
- Ennemond Gaultier (c.1575–1651)
- Denis Gaultier (c.1597–1672)
- Pierre Gaultier (c.1599–?)
- François de Chancy (1600–1656)
- Jacques Gaultier (c.1600–1652)
- François Dufault (c.1604–c.1672)
- Charles Fleury (c.1605–1652)
- Jacques de Saint-Luc (1616– c.1710)
- Charles Mouton (1617–before 1699)
- Jacques Gallot (c.1625–c.1695)
- Robert de Visée (1650–1725)

== Germany ==
- Hans Judenkünig (c.1450–1526)
- Hans Gerle (c.1500–1570)
- Hans Neusidler (c.1508–1563)
- Elias Mertel (c.1561–1626)
- Johann Daniel Mylius (c.1583–1642)
- Philipp Stolle (1614–1675)
- Esaias Reusner (1636–1679)
- Johann Krieger (1651–1735)
- Georg Böhm (1661–1733)
- David Kellner (1670–1747)
- Sylvius Leopold Weiss (1687–1750)
- Ernst Gottlieb Baron (1696–1760)
- Adam Falckenhagen (1697–1761)
- Johann Kropfgans (1708–c.1770)
- Bernhard Joachim Hagen (1720–1787)

== Hungary ==
- Bálint Bakfark (1507–1576)

== Italy ==
- Vincenzo Capirola (1474–after 1548)
- Santino Garsi da Parma (1542–1604)
- Simone Molinaro (1565–1615)
- Alfonso Ferrabosco (I) (1575–1628)
- Michelagnolo Galilei (1575–1631)
- Ludovico Roncalli (1600?)
- Francesco Corbetta (1612–1681)
- Giovanni Battista Granata (1620/21–1687)
- Tomaso Giovanni Albinoni (1671–1751)
- Antonio Vivaldi (1678–1741)
- Domenico Scarlatti (1685–1757)
- Benedetto Marcello (1686–1739)
- Giuseppe Antonio Brescianello (1690–1758)
- Pietro Locatelli (1695–1764)
- Giovanni Benedetto Platti (1697–1763)

== Netherlands ==
- Joachim van den Hove (1567–1620)

== Spain ==
- Enríquez de Valderrábano (1500–1557)
- Luis de Milán (1500–1561)
- Miguel de Fuenllana (1500?–1579)
- Alonso de Mudarra (1508–1580)
- Diego Pisador (1509–1557)
- Luis de Narváez (1510–1555)
- Antonio de Cabezón (1510–1566)
- Tomás de Santa María (1510–1570)
- Esteban Daza (c.1537–1591/6)
- Lucas Ruiz de Ribayaz (1626–after 1677)
- Gaspar Sanz (1640–1710)
- Juan Bautista Cabanilles (1644–1712)
- Francisco Guerau (1649–1717/22)

== Sweden ==
- Johan Helmich Roman (1694–1758)
