= Passacaglia =

Musical form written in triple metre

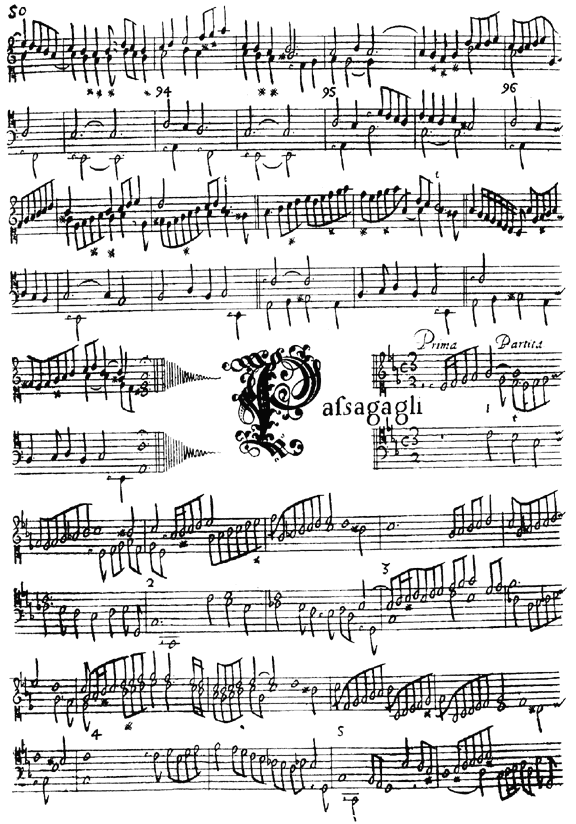
Bernardo Storace, last bars of Passagagli sopra A la mi re and beginning of Passagagli sopra C sol fa ut, from Selva di varie compositioni (Venice, 1664)

The passacaglia (/pæsəˈkɑːliə/; Italian: [passaˈkaʎʎa]) is a musical form that originated in early seventeenth-century Spain and is still used today by composers. It is usually of a serious character and is typically based on a bass-ostinato and written in triple metre.

== Origin ==
The term passacaglia (Spanish: pasacalle; French: passacaille; Italian: passacaglia, passacaglio, passagallo, passacagli, passacaglie) derives from the Spanish pasar (cross, pass) and calle (street). It originated in early 17th-century Spain as a strummed interlude between instrumentally accompanied dances or songs. Despite the form's Spanish roots (confirmed by references in Spanish literature of the period), the first written examples of passacaglias are found in an Italian source dated 1606. These pieces, as well as others from Italian sources from the beginning of the century, are simple, brief sequences of chords outlining a cadential formula.

The passacaglia was redefined in the late 1620s by Italian composer Girolamo Frescobaldi, who transformed it into a series of continuous variations over a bass (which itself may be varied). Later composers adopted this model, and by the nineteenth century the word came to mean a series of variations over an ostinato pattern, usually of a serious character. A similar form, the chaconne, was also first developed by Frescobaldi. The two genres are closely related, and since "composers often used the terms chaconne and passacaglia indiscriminately ... modern attempts to arrive at a clear distinction are arbitrary and historically unfounded".

In early scholarship, attempts to formally differentiate between the historical chaconne and passacaglia were made, but researchers often came to opposite conclusions. For example, Percy Goetschius held that the chaconne is usually based on a harmonic sequence with a recurring soprano melody, and the passacaglia was formed over a ground bass pattern, whereas Clarence Lucas defined the two forms in precisely the opposite way. More recently, however, some progress has been made toward making a useful distinction for the usage of the seventeenth and early eighteenth centuries, when some composers (notably Frescobaldi and François Couperin) deliberately mixed the two genres in the same composition.

The melodic pattern—usually four, six or eight (rarely seven) bars long—repeats without change through the duration of the piece, while the upper lines are varied freely, over the bass pattern serving as a harmonic anchor.

The seventeenth-century chaconne, as found in Frescobaldi's music, more often than not is in a major key, while the passacaglia is usually in a minor key. In eighteenth-century French practice, the passacaglia leans more strongly to the melodic basso ostinato, while the chaconne, "in a reversal of the [seventeenth-century] Italian practice, in various respects undergoes a freer treatment".

== Composers ==
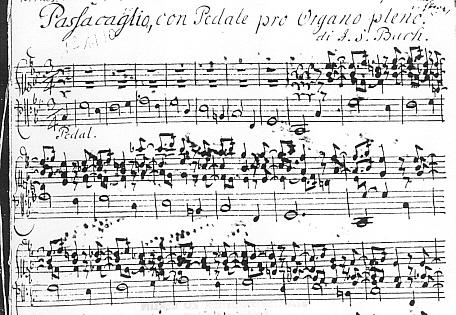
First page of a manuscript of the Passacaglia and Fugue in C minor, BWV 582, by Johann Sebastian Bach

Some examples are the organ passacaglias of Johann Sebastian Bach, Dieterich Buxtehude, Johann Pachelbel, Sigfrid Karg-Elert, Johann Caspar Kerll, Daniel Gregory Mason, Georg Muffat, Gottlieb Muffat, Johann Kuhnau, Juan Bautista Cabanilles, Bernardo Pasquini, Max Reger, Ralph Vaughan Williams (Passacaglia on B–G–C, 1933), George Frideric Handel and Leo Sowerby.

Passacaglias for lute have been composed by figures such as Alessandro Piccinini, Giovanni Girolamo Kapsperger, Sylvius Leopold Weiss, Esaias Reusner, Count Logy, Robert de Visée, Jacques Bittner, Philipp Franz Lesage de Richée, François Dufault, Jacques Gallot, Denis Gaultier, Ennemond Gaultier, and Roman Turovsky-Savchuk, a passacaglia for bandura by Julian Kytasty, and for baroque guitar by Paulo Galvão, Santiago de Murcia, Francisco Guerau, Gaspar Sanz, and Marcello Vitale.

=== Baroque ===
One of the best known examples of the passacaglia in Western classical music is the Passacaglia and Fugue in C minor, BWV 582, for organ by Johann Sebastian Bach. The French clavecinists, especially Louis Couperin and his nephew François Couperin, used a variant of the form—the passacaille en rondeau—with a recurring episode between the variations. Heinrich Ignaz Franz Biber's "Passacaglia", the last piece of the monumental Rosary Sonatas, is one of the earliest known compositions for solo violin. The central episode of Claudio Monteverdi's madrigal Lamento della Ninfa is a passacaglia on a descending tetrachord. The first two movements of the fourth sonata from Johann Heinrich Schmelzer's Sonatæ unarum fidium are passacaglias on a descending tetrachord, but in uncharacteristic major. In 1650 or earlier, Andrea Falconieri published a passacalle movement à tre, basso continuo, in Naples. The fourth movement of Luigi Boccherini's Quintettino No. 6, Op. 30, (also known as Musica notturna delle strade di Madrid) is titled "Passacalle". The last movement of George Frideric Handel's Harpsichord Suite in G minor (HWV 432) is a passacaglia which has become well known as a duo for violin and viola, arranged by the Norwegian violinist Johan Halvorsen.

Other examples of passacaille include Les plaisirs ont choisi from Jean-Baptiste Lully's opera Armide (1686) and Dido's Lament, When I am Laid in Earth from Henry Purcell's Dido and Aeneas, the aria Piango, gemo, sospiro by Antonio Vivaldi, or "Usurpator tiranno" and Stabat Mater by Giovanni Felice Sances, et al.

=== Romantic ===
Nineteenth-century examples include the C-minor passacaglia for organ by Felix Mendelssohn, and the finale of Josef Rheinberger's Eighth Organ Sonata. Notable passacaglias by Johannes Brahms can be found in the last movement of his Fourth Symphony, which many musicians place among Brahms' finest compositions. Composed by Brahms to conform to the strict metrics of classical dance, British conductor Constant Lambert called the piece "grimly intellectual". In Brahms's Variations on a Theme by Haydn, the bass repeats the same harmonic pattern throughout the piece. The first movement of Hans Huber's Piano Concerto No. 3, Op. 113 (1899) is a passacaglia.

=== Modern ===
The passacaglia proved an enduring form throughout the twentieth century and beyond. In mid-century, one writer stated that "despite the inevitable lag in the performance of new music, there are more twentieth-century passacaglias in the active repertory of performers than baroque works in this form."

Three composers especially identified with the passacaglia are Benjamin Britten, Dmitri Shostakovich, and Paul Hindemith. In his operas, Britten often uses a passacaglia to create the climactic moment of the drama. Examples are found in Peter Grimes, Billy Budd, The Turn of the Screw, Death in Venice, and even in the comic opera Albert Herring. Britten also employed the form in smaller vocal forms, such as the Serenade for Tenor, Horn and Strings (1943) and The Holy Sonnets of John Donne (1945) for voice and piano, as well as in purely instrumental compositions, notably in the Violin Concerto, the second and third Cello suites, the second and third string quartets, the Cello Symphony, and the Nocturnal after John Dowland for guitar.

Shostakovich restricted his use of the passacaglia to instrumental forms, the most notable examples being found in his Interlude in Act II of the opera Lady Macbeth of Mtsensk, Tenth String Quartet, Second Piano Trio, Eighth and Fifteenth Symphonies, and First Violin Concerto.

Hindemith employed the form to conclude his 1938 ballet, Nobilissima Visione, and it is also found in his early Sonata for viola solo, Op. 11, No. 5 (1919) and the second movement of the song cycle Das Marienleben (1948), as well as in later works such as the Fifth String Quartet and the Octet for winds and strings.

Igor Stravinsky used the form for the central movement of his Septet (1953), a transitional work between his neoclassical and serial periods. A passacaglia is also found in the finale of Witold Lutosławski's Concerto for Orchestra, and in the final movement of Caroline Shaw's Partita for 8 Voices.

Especially important examples of the form are found in the output of the Second Viennese School. Anton Webern's Opus 1 is a Passacaglia for orchestra, Arnold Schoenberg included a passacaglia movement, "Nacht", in Pierrot lunaire, and Alban Berg, like Britten, used a passacaglia operatically, in act 1, scene 4 of Wozzeck.
