= Johann Jakob Froberger =

German Baroque composer, keyboard virtuoso and organist

- Baptised: 19 May 1616
- Died: May 1667 (aged 50–51)
- Era: Baroque
- Works: List of compositions

Johann Jakob Froberger (baptized 19 May 1616 – 7 May 1667) was a German Baroque composer, keyboard virtuoso, and organist. Among the most famous composers of the era, he was influential in developing the musical form of the suite of dances in his keyboard works. His harpsichord pieces are highly idiomatic and programmatic.

Only two of Froberger's many compositions were published during his lifetime. Froberger forbade publication of his manuscripts, restricting access to his noble patrons and friends, particularly the Württembergs and Habsburgs who had the power to enforce these restrictions. After his death the manuscripts went to his patroness Sibylla, Duchess of Württemberg (1620–1707) and the music library of the Württemberg family estate.

== Life ==
=== 1616–1634: Early years in Stuttgart ===
Johann Jakob Froberger was baptized on 19 May 1616 in Stuttgart. The exact date of his birth is unknown. His family came from Halle, where his grandfather Simon lived and his father Basilius (1575–1637) was born. In 1599 Basilius moved to Stuttgart and became a tenor in the Württemberg court chapel. At some point before 1605 he married Anna Schmid (1577–1637), who came from a Schwabian family living in Stuttgart. By the time Johann Jakob was born, his father's career was already flourishing, and in 1621 Basilius became court Kapellmeister. Of his eleven children with Anna, four became musicians (Johann Jakob, Johann Christoph, Johann Georg and Isaac; all but Johann Jakob served at the Württemberg court in Stuttgart), and so it is likely that Johann Jakob received his first music lessons from his father.

Although the Thirty Years' War which started in 1618 undoubtedly made life in Stuttgart somewhat more difficult, the city's musical life was rich and varied, influenced by musicians from all over Europe, so already at the very beginning of his life Froberger must have been exposed to a wide variety of musical traditions. Little is known about his actual education, though. His teachers possibly included Johann Ulrich Steigleder, and he may have met Samuel Scheidt during the latter's visit to Stuttgart in 1627. It is possible that Froberger sang in the court chapel, but there is no direct evidence thereof. Court archives indicate that one of the English lutenists employed by the court, Andrew Borell, taught lute to one of Basilius Froberger's sons in 1621–22 – it is not known whether this son was Johann Jakob, but if so, it would explain his later interest in French lute music.

Basilius Froberger's music library probably also helped in Johann Jakob's education. It contained more than a hundred volumes of music, including works by Josquin des Prez, Samuel Scheidt and Michael Praetorius, as well as pieces by the lesser known Johann Staden, founder of the Nuremberg school, and Giovanni Valentini, the then-famous Viennese Kapellmeister who later taught Johann Kaspar Kerll.

=== 1634–1649: Court service in Vienna and voyages to Italy ===
The Hofkapelle Stuttgart was disbanded in 1634 in the wake of the Protestants' defeat in the Battle of Nördlingen. In Grundlage einer Ehrenpforte (1740) Mattheson writes that a certain Swedish ambassador was so impressed with Froberger's musical skills that he took the 18-year-old musician to Vienna and presumably recommended him to the imperial court. This seems unlikely, however, because at the time Sweden was allied with Lutheran Württemberg against the imperial forces; so exactly why Froberger left for Vienna at around 1634 and how he managed to find employment as a singer in the imperial chapel, remains a mystery.

In 1637 Basilius Froberger, his wife and one of his daughters died of plague. Johann Jakob and his brother Isaac sold their father's music library to the Württemberg court (this is how the contents of Basilius' library became known – through the court archives); the same year Johann Jakob became court organist in Vienna, assisting Wolfgang Ebner. In June he was granted a leave and a stipend to go to Rome to study under Frescobaldi. Froberger spent the next three years in Italy and, like many other musicians who went to study there, apparently converted to Catholicism. He returned to Vienna in 1641 and served as organist and chamber musician until the fall of 1645, when he took a second trip to Italy. It was previously thought that Froberger went to study under Giacomo Carissimi, but recent research shows that he most probably studied with Athanasius Kircher in Rome. If so, Froberger's intention must have been acquiring mastery of vocal composition of the prima pratica (Frescobaldi, who taught him instrumental writing, died in 1643). Sometime during 1648–49 Froberger might have met Johann Kaspar Kerll, and possibly taught him.

In 1649 Froberger travelled back to Austria. On his way back he stopped in Florence and Mantua to show the arca musurgica, a powerful compositional device Kircher taught him, to some of the Italian princes. In September he arrived in Vienna and demonstrated the arca musurgica to the Emperor, an avid amateur musician; he also presented him with Libro Secondo, a collection of his own compositions (the Libro Primo is now lost). Also in September, Froberger played before William Swann, an English diplomat. Through Swann he got to know Constantijn Huygens, who became Froberger's lifelong friend and introduced the composer to works by contemporary French masters – Jacques Champion de Chambonnières, Denis Gaultier and Ennemond Gaultier.

=== 1649–1653: Years of travels ===
Following the Empress Maria Leopoldine's death in August the court's musical activities were suspended. Froberger left the city and travelled widely for the next four years, likely entrusted by the Emperor with some extra-musical duties in the fields of diplomacy and possibly espionage (as for example John Dowland and Peter Paul Rubens were doing during their travels). Not much is known about these voyages. Dresden was probably one of the first cities Froberger visited: he played before the electoral court of John George I and presented the Elector with a collection of his works. He also met Matthias Weckmann while in Dresden, and this encounter turned to another lifelong friendship; the two continued to exchange letters and Froberger even sent some of his music to Weckmann to illustrate his style. According to a pupil, after Dresden Froberger visited Cologne, Düsseldorf, Zeeland, Brabant and Antwerp; we also know that he also visited Brussels at least two times (in 1650 and 1652), London (after a disastrous voyage during which Froberger got robbed, an event he described musically in Plainte faite à Londres pour passer la mélancholie) and, most importantly, Paris (at least once, in 1652).

In Paris Froberger most probably became acquainted with many major French composers of the era, including Chambonnières, Louis Couperin, Denis Gaultier and possibly François Dufault. The latter two were famous lutenists writing in the characteristic French idiom of style brisé, which influenced Froberger's later harpsichord suites. In turn, Louis Couperin was profoundly influenced by Froberger's style; one of his unmeasured preludes even bears the subtitle "à l'imitation de Mr. Froberger". In November 1652 Froberger witnessed the death of the famed lutenist Blancrocher (who was his friend and reportedly died in his arms). Although Blancrocher himself was not an important composer, his death left a mark on the history of music, as Couperin, Gaultier, Dufaut and Froberger all wrote tombeaux lamenting the event.

=== 1653–1667: Last years in Vienna, retirement and death ===
In 1653 Froberger passed through Heidelberg, Nuremberg and Regensburg before returning to Vienna in April. He remained with the Viennese court during the next four years, producing at least one more collection of music, the Libro Quarto of 1656 (Libro Terzo is now lost). Froberger was apparently deeply saddened by Emperor Ferdinand III's death on 2 April 1657 and wrote a lamentation dedicated to the memory of the Emperor. His relationship with Ferdinand's successor, Leopold I, was strained for a number of political reasons (numerous forces were opposed to Leopold's election, and among them were the Jesuit order and Johann Philipp von Schönborn, Elector-Archbishop of Mainz; Froberger's mentor and friend Kircher was an important figure in the former, and Froberger had strong ties with the court of the latter. Froberger did, however, dedicate a new volume of his works to Leopold), and on June 30, 1657 Froberger received his last salary as a member of the imperial chapel.

Little is known about Froberger's last 10 years. Most of the information comes from the letter exchange between Constantijn Huygens and the dowager Duchess of Montbéliard, Sybilla (1620–1707). Since the death of her husband Léopold-Frédéric of Württemberg-Montbéliard in 1662 the Duchess lived in Héricourt (near Montbéliard, then territory of the house of Württemberg; now département Doubs), and Froberger became her music teacher at around the same time (this indicates that Froberger must have maintained a link with the ducal family of Württemberg since his Stuttgart years). He lived in Château d’Héricourt, the dower house of Duchess Sibylla. The Huygens-Sybilla letters indicate that in 1665 Froberger travelled to Mainz, where he performed at the court of the Elector-Archbishop of Mainz and met Huygens in person for the first time; and at a certain point in 1666 the composer had plans to return to the imperial court in Vienna. As far as is known, though, he never did, and lived in Héricourt until his death on 6 or 7 May 1667. Froberger apparently knew that he was going to die soon, as he made all necessary preparations a day before he died.

== Works ==
=== General information ===
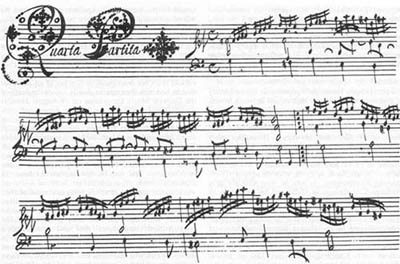
The fourth suite from one of the Vienna manuscripts.

Only two compositions by Froberger were published during his lifetime: the Hexachord Fantasia, published by Kircher in 1650 in Rome, and a piece in François Roberday's Fugues et caprices (1660, Paris). In addition to these, a comparatively large number of works are preserved in authenticated manuscripts. The three principal sources for Froberger's music are the following manuscripts:

- Libro Secundo (1649) and Libro Quarto (1656), two richly decorated volumes dedicated to Ferdinand III. Both were found in Vienna; the decorations and calligraphy are by Johann Friedrich Sautter, Froberger's friend from his Stuttgart years. Each book has four chapters and contains 24 pieces. Both include six toccatas and six suites; Libro Secundo adds 6 fantasias and 6 canzonas, whereas Libro Quarto instead has 6 ricercars and 6 capriccios.
- Libro di capricci e ricercate (c. 1658). 6 capriccios and 6 ricercars.

Also, in 2006 an autograph manuscript was discovered (and subsequently sold at Sotheby's to an anonymous bidder), reportedly containing 35 pieces of music, 18 of which were previously unknown and remain unedited. The manuscript dates from Froberger's final years and may contain his last compositions. Three toccatas in Ms. Chigi Q.IV.25 very likely are early Froberger compositions while he studied with Frescobaldi, as Bob van Asperen has argued in 2009. Other than these, numerous manuscripts of various origin contain Froberger's music. These include the well-known Bauyn manuscript, and a very large number of less known sources, some reliable (such as the only unbowdlerized text for Méditation sur ma mort future, presumably in Weckmann's hand, or the Strasbourg manuscript of some couple of dozen of suites, possibly compiled by Michael Bulyowsky) and some not very much so. Problems arise with many of the newly discovered copies: either Froberger was constantly reworking his compositions, or the scribes were not attentive enough, but many works exist in several variants, some of which even have whole movements changed.

Two standard numbering systems are used to identify Froberger's works. These are:

- the numbers used in the early 20th century Denkmäler der Tonkunst in Österreich series and the Guido Adler edition; commonly referred to as the DTÖ numbers or the Adler numbers. This catalogue has separate numbering for different genres, with pieces identified as Toccata No. 4, Ricercare No. 2, Suite No. 20, etc. The DTÖ contains a few compositions falsely attributed to Froberger, and some identical ones.
- FbWV numbers from the Siegbert Rampe catalogue compiled in the early 1990s. Rampe's catalogue is more complete and includes newly discovered pieces as well as pieces whose authorship is questioned. The Adler numbers are incorporated, for example all Toccatas are numbered 1xx, hence Adler Toccata No. 1 has the Rampe number FbWV 101. For more information, see List of compositions by Johann Jakob Froberger.

=== Harpsichord suites and programmatic pieces ===
One of the toccatas from the Vienna manuscripts.

Froberger is usually credited as the creator of the Baroque suite. While this may be misleading, French composers of the time did group dance pieces by tonality above all, and while other composers such as Kindermann did try to invent some kind of organisation, their dances did not attain as high a degree of artistic merit as seen in Froberger's suites. The typical Froberger suite established allemande, courante, sarabande and gigue as the obligatory parts of a suite. However, there is some controversy surrounding the placement of the gigue. In Froberger's earliest authenticated autograph, Libro Secondo, five out of six suites are in three movements, without the gigue. A single suite, no. 2, has a gigue added as a 4th movement (and a later copy adds gigues to suites nos. 3 and 5). The suites of Libro Quarto all have gigues as the 2nd movement. The order that became the standard after Froberger's death, with the gigue being the last movement, first appeared in a 1690s print of Froberger's works by the Amsterdam publisher Mortier.

All Froberger's dances are composed of two repeated sections, but they are very rarely in the standard 8+8 bars scheme. When symmetrical structure is employed, it may be 7+7 bars or 11+11 bars; more frequently one of the sections is longer or shorter than the other (more often the second is shorter than the first). This irregularity may be employed by Froberger in any dance, whereas in Chambonnières, who used similarly irregular patterns, the sarabande is always composed in the 8+16 fashion. Froberger's keyboard adaptation of the French lute style brisé almost invariably shows itself in most pieces written during and after his Paris visit.

Froberger's allemandes abandon the original dance's rhythmic scheme almost completely, abounding in short gestures, figures, ornaments and runs typical of style brisé. Like Chambonnières, Froberger avoids emphasizing internal cadences, or indeed anything that would hint at any sort of regularity; unlike him, Froberger tends to use faster sixteenth-note figurations and melodies. Most of the courantes are in 6/4 time with occasional hemiolas and the eighth-note motion typical of the courante. Some of the others, however, are in 3/2 time, twice slower and moving in quarter notes. Still others are in 3/4 time and closely resemble the Italian corrente of the time. The sarabandes are mostly in 3/2 time and employ a whole note–half note rhythmic pattern, rather than the standard sarabande rhythm with the accent on the second beat. The gigues are almost invariably fugal, either in compound (6/8) or triple (3/4) meter; different sections may use different motifs, and occasionally the first section's subject is inverted for another section. Bizarrely, a few gigues use dotted rhythms in 4/4 time, and a couple feature exquisite rhapsodic 4/4 endings.

Some of the works feature written indications such as "f" and "piano" (to notate an echo effect), "doucement" ("gently") and "avec discrétion" (expressive rubato). In some of the sources such markings are particularly abundant, and the newly (2004) discovered Berlin Sing-Akademie SA 4450 manuscript adds similar indications to free sections in organ toccatas. Some suites feature doubles; in a few, the courante is a derivative of the allemande (although this is rare; more often Froberger unites the two dances by giving them somewhat similar beginnings, but keeps the rest of the material different). Suite no. 6 from Libro Secondo is actually a set of variations subtitled Auff der Mayerin, and one of the more popular Froberger works, although it is clearly an early work and not comparable to the late suites either in technique or in expression.

Apart from the suites, Froberger also wrote titled, descriptive pieces for the harpsichord (some of the suites incorporate such works as their first movement). He was one of the earliest composers to produce such programmatic pieces. Nearly all of them are very personal; the style resembles Froberger's allemandes in its irregularity and style brisé features. Such pieces include the following (in alphabetical order):

Allemande faite en passant le Rhin dans une barque en grand péril. Note the 26 numbered passages with explanations of each.

- Allemande, faite en passant le Rhin dans une barque en grand péril
- Lamentation faite sur la mort très douloureuse de Sa Majesté Impériale, Ferdinand le troisième, An. 1657
- Lamentation sur ce que j'ay été volé et se joüe à la discretion et encore mieux que les soldats m'ont traité
- Lamento sopra la dolorosa perdita della Real Maestà di Ferdinando IV Rè de Romani
- Méditation sur ma mort future
- Plainte faite à Londres pour passer la melancholie
- Tombeau fait à Paris sur la mort de Monsieur Blancrocher

These works frequently feature musical metaphors: in the lamentations on the deaths of the lutenist Blancrocher and Ferdinand IV, Froberger represents Blancrocher's fatal fall down a flight of stairs with a descending scale, and Ferdinand's ascent into heaven with an ascending one; in the Ferdinand III lamentation he ends the piece with a single voice repeating an F three times. Froberger would often supply such works with an explanation, sometimes very detailed (see illustration), of the events that led to the composition of the piece. For instance, the Allemande, faite en passat le Rhin contains 26 numbered passages with explanation for each; the Blancrocher tombeau features a written preface in which the circumstances of the lutenist's death are recounted, etc. The structure and style of Froberger's programmatic works, as well as his allemandes, contributed to the development of the unmeasured prelude through the efforts of Louis Couperin.

=== Polyphonic keyboard works ===
The rest of Froberger's keyboard works may be performed on any keyboard instrument, including the organ. The toccatas are the only ones to employ free writing to some degree; the majority are strictly polyphonic. In terms of organisation, Froberger's toccatas are reminiscent of those by Michelangelo Rossi, also a student of Frescobaldi; instead of being composed of numerous brief parts, they feature a few tightly woven sections, alternating between strict polyphony and free, improvisational passages. They are usually of moderate length and the harmonic content is not dissimilar to Frescobaldi's, although Froberger's harmony favors softer, more pleasing turns (not without some notable exceptions, particularly in the two Da sonarsi alla Levatione works), and his toccatas are always more focused on the original tonality, unlike those by either Frescobaldi or Rossi. The fugal sections are present in most toccatas and are quasi-imitative and are not as strict as later 17th century fugues; when a toccata features several fugal inserts, a single motif may be used for all of them, varied rhythmically.

Whereas in Frescobaldi's oeuvre the fantasia and the ricercare are markedly different genres (the fantasia being a relatively simple contrapuntal composition that expands, as it progresses, into a flurry of intense, rhythmically complex counterpoint; the ricercare being essentially a very strict contrapuntal piece with easily audible lines and somewhat archaic in terms of structure), Froberger's are practically similar. A typical Froberger ricercare or fantasia uses a single subject (with different rhythmic variations for different sections) throughout the whole piece, and the counterpoint adheres almost flawlessly to the 16th century prima pratica. Any of the standard contrapuntal devices may be used; the main subject is sometimes paired with another theme for a section or two, and there is usually a marked contrast between sections and much variety inside a single piece.

Froberger's canzonas and capriccios are similarly conservative in terms of technique, and they too are essentially the same even though Frescobaldi distinguished between the genres. Froberger follows Frescobaldi's example in constructing these pieces as variation sets in several sections (usually three in canzonas and any number – as many as six – in capriccios). The subjects are always faster, much more lively that those of ricercares and fantasias. A characteristic feature is the economy of themes: the episodes, which are somewhat rare, are almost invariably based on the material from the subject, somewhat like those in JS Bach's work some 60–70 years later. The counterpoint and harmony are very similar to the ricercares and fantasias; however, occasionally scale degrees other than 1 and 5 are used.

=== Other works ===
The only surviving non-keyboard works by Froberger are two motets, Alleluia! Absorpta es mors and Apparuerunt apostolis. They are found in the so-called Düben collection, compiled by Gustaf Düben, a famous Swedish collector and composer. The manuscript is kept in the Uppsala University library. These motets are quite similar in style: both are scored for a three-voice (STB) choir, two violins and organ (which is given a single melodic line, not polyphony, as was common in Italian motets of the time), and cast in the early 17th century Venetian stile concertante, in marked contrast with Froberger's preference for older techniques in his polyphonic keyboard works. Another connection to contemporary practice is that the small ensemble is almost identical to one used by Heinrich Schütz in the second volume of Symphoniae sacrae published in 1647.

== Posthumous influence ==
Although only two of Froberger's works were published during his lifetime, his music was widely spread in Europe in hand-written copies, and he was one of the most famous composers of the era (although he studied in Italy and obviously had friends and former mentors there, no Italian sources of his music were found). Because of his travels and his ability to absorb various national styles and incorporate them into his music, Froberger, along with other cosmopolitan composers such as Johann Kaspar Kerll and Georg Muffat, contributed greatly to the exchange of musical traditions in Europe. Finally, he was among the first major keyboard composers in history and the first to focus equally on both harpsichord/clavichord and organ.

Froberger's compositions were known to and studied by, among many others, Johann Pachelbel, Dieterich Buxtehude, Georg Muffat and his son Gottlieb Muffat, Johann Caspar Kerll, Matthias Weckmann, Louis Couperin, Johann Kirnberger, Johann Nikolaus Forkel, Georg Böhm, George Frideric Handel and Johann Sebastian Bach. Furthermore, copies in Mozart's hand of the Hexachord Fantasia survive, and even Beethoven knew Froberger's work through Albrechtsberger's teachings. The profound influence on Louis Couperin made Froberger partially responsible for the change Couperin brought into the French organ tradition (as well as for the development of the unmeasured prelude, which Couperin cultivated).

Although the polyphonic pieces were highly esteemed in the 17th and 18th centuries, today Froberger is chiefly remembered for his contribution to the development of the keyboard suite. Indeed, he established the form almost single-handedly and, through innovative and imaginative treatment of standard dance forms of the time, paved the way for Johann Sebastian Bach's elaborate contributions to the genre (not to mention almost every major composer in Europe, since the vast majority composed suites and were influenced by the "French style" exemplified by Froberger).

== Notable recordings ==
- Johann Jakob Froberger: Works for Harpsichord (1990). Gustav Leonhardt (harpsichord). Deutsche Harmonia Mundi RD77923
  - A selection of 18 works for harpsichord, concluding with the Tombeau faict à Paris sur la mort de Monsieur Blancrocher.
- Johann Jakob Froberger: The Complete Keyboard Works (1994). Richard Egarr (organ, harpsichord). Globe GLO 6022–6025
  - Organized by manuscript and retains the original order of the pieces; works discovered after 1994 are not included. Also includes several works by other composers that were previously attributed to Froberger.
- The Unknown Works (2003–04). Siegbert Rampe (organ, harpsichord, clavichord). MDG 341 1186-2 and 341 1195-2
  - A recording of some 20 newly discovered works (mostly suites) and pieces of doubtful authorship.
- The Strasbourg Manuscript (2000). Ludger Rémy (harpsichord). CPO 9997502
  - Includes fourteen suites from the recently discovered Strasbourg Manuscript, only three of them known from autograph sources.
- Froberger Edition (2000–). Bob van Asperen (harpsichord, organ). AE 10024, 10054, 10064, 10074 (harpsichord), AE 10501, AE 10601, AE 10701 (organ)
  - The series is designed to be in 8 parts. Volume 4 makes use of the newest discoveries from the manuscripts of the Berliner Singakademie.
- Johann Jakob Froberger: Complete Music for Harpsichord and Organ (2016). Simone Stella (organ, harpsichord). 16 cd box Brilliant Classics BC 94740
  - As of 2016, this is the most updated complete recording. Organized by sources; includes newly discovered works.

== Media ==
Tombeau fait à Paris sur la mort de Monsieur Blancheroche, C minor, FbWV 632
Performed in 2019 on a harpsichord by Richard Siegel

Tombeau fait à Paris sur la mort de Monsieur Blancrocher, C minor, FbWV 632
Performed in 1973 on a clavichord by Joan Benson

Fantasia No. 2 from Libro Secondo (1649), on the Pange Lingua theme, E minor, FbWV 202
Performed on an Italian harpsichord by Martha Goldstein

Lamento sopra la dolorosa perdita della Real Maestà di Ferdinando IV Rè de Romani, C major, FbWV 612
Performed on an Italian harpsichord by Martha Goldstein

Canzona No. 5 for organ, first part (MIDI)

== See also ==
- Stylus fantasticus

== References and further reading ==
- Howard Schott. "Johann Jakob Froberger", Grove Music Online, ed. L. Macy. (subscription access).
- Avo Sõmer. "The Keyboard Music of Johann Jakob Froberger." University of Michigan, 1963, dissertation.
- Willi Apel. The History of Keyboard Music to 1700. Translated by Hans Tischler. Indiana University Press, 1972. ISBN 0-253-21141-7. Originally published as Geschichte der Orgel- und Klaviermusik bis 1700 by Bärenreiter-Verlag, Kassel.
- Andreas Vejvar / Markus Grassl (ed.). "'Avec discrétion'. Rethinking Froberger". Böhlau, Wien–Köln–Weimar, 2018 (Wiener Veröffentlichungen zur Musikgeschichte 14) [contributions in German and English] ISBN 978-3-205-20740-5.
