= Jean-Henri d'Anglebert =

French composer, harpsichordist and organist

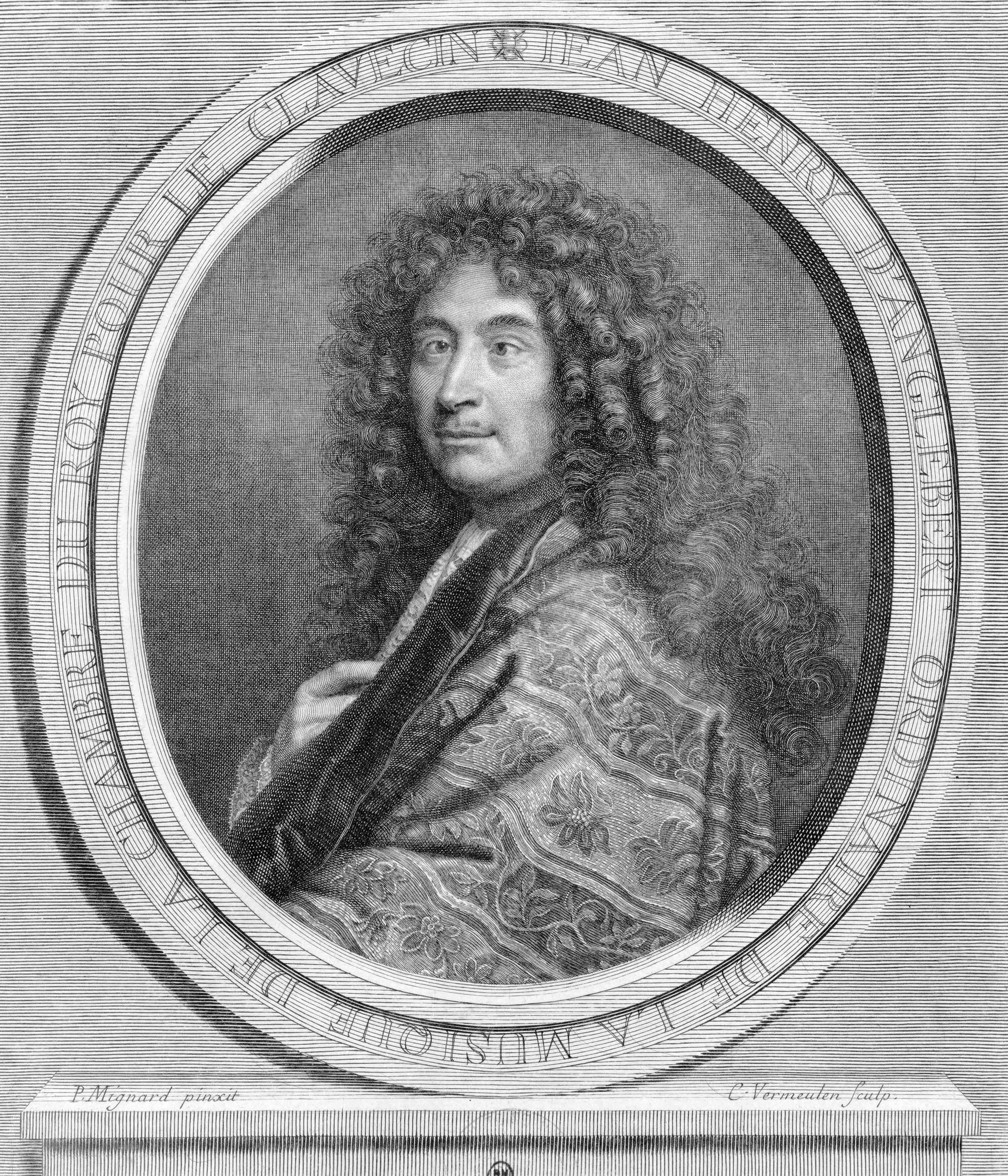
Jean-Henri d'Anglebert

Jean-Henri d'Anglebert (baptized 1 April 1629 – 23 April 1691) was a French composer, harpsichordist and organist. He was one of the foremost keyboard composers of his day.

== Life ==
D'Anglebert's father Claude Henry known as Anglebert was an affluent shoemaker in Bar-le-Duc, Duchy of Bar. Nothing is known about the composer's early years and musical education. It is not clear when he immigrated to France. Since he at one time composed a tombeau for Jacques Champion de Chambonnières, it is possible that Chambonnières was his teacher—or at any rate a friend for whom D'Anglebert had much respect. The earliest surviving manuscript with D'Anglebert's music dates from 1650–1659. It also contains music by Louis Couperin and Chambonnières, and possibly originated in their immediate circle; thus already by the mid-1650s D'Anglebert must have been closely associated with the most prominent French harpsichordists of the time. The earliest reference to D'Anglebert survives in his marriage contract from 11 October 1659. D'Anglebert married Magdelaine Champagne, sister-in-law of the organist François Roberday. In the contract, he is described as bourgeois de Paris, suggesting that by 1659 he was already well established in Paris. How he left Bar-le-Duc and settled in Paris remains unknown.

D'Anglebert's career in Paris must have begun at the Jacobins church in Rue St. Honoré, where he was still organist in January 1660. In August 1660 he succeeded Henri Dumont as harpsichordist to Philippe I, Duke of Orléans, the King's younger brother. He kept the position until at least 1668, but in the meantime, in 1662, he bought the reversion of the post of harpsichordist from Chambonnières, who had been recently disgraced at the court; Chambonnières kept the salary, but D'Anglebert assumed the duties. He served as royal harpsichordist until his son Jean-Baptiste-Henry became his reversioner in 1674. After 1679 D'Anglebert served Dauphine Duchess Maria Anna Victoria of Bavaria, who died in 1690. D'Anglebert died the following year, on 23 April. His only published work, Pièces de clavecin, appeared just two years before, in 1689. The rest of his music—mostly harpsichord works, but also five fugues and a quatuor for organ—survives in manuscripts.

== Works ==
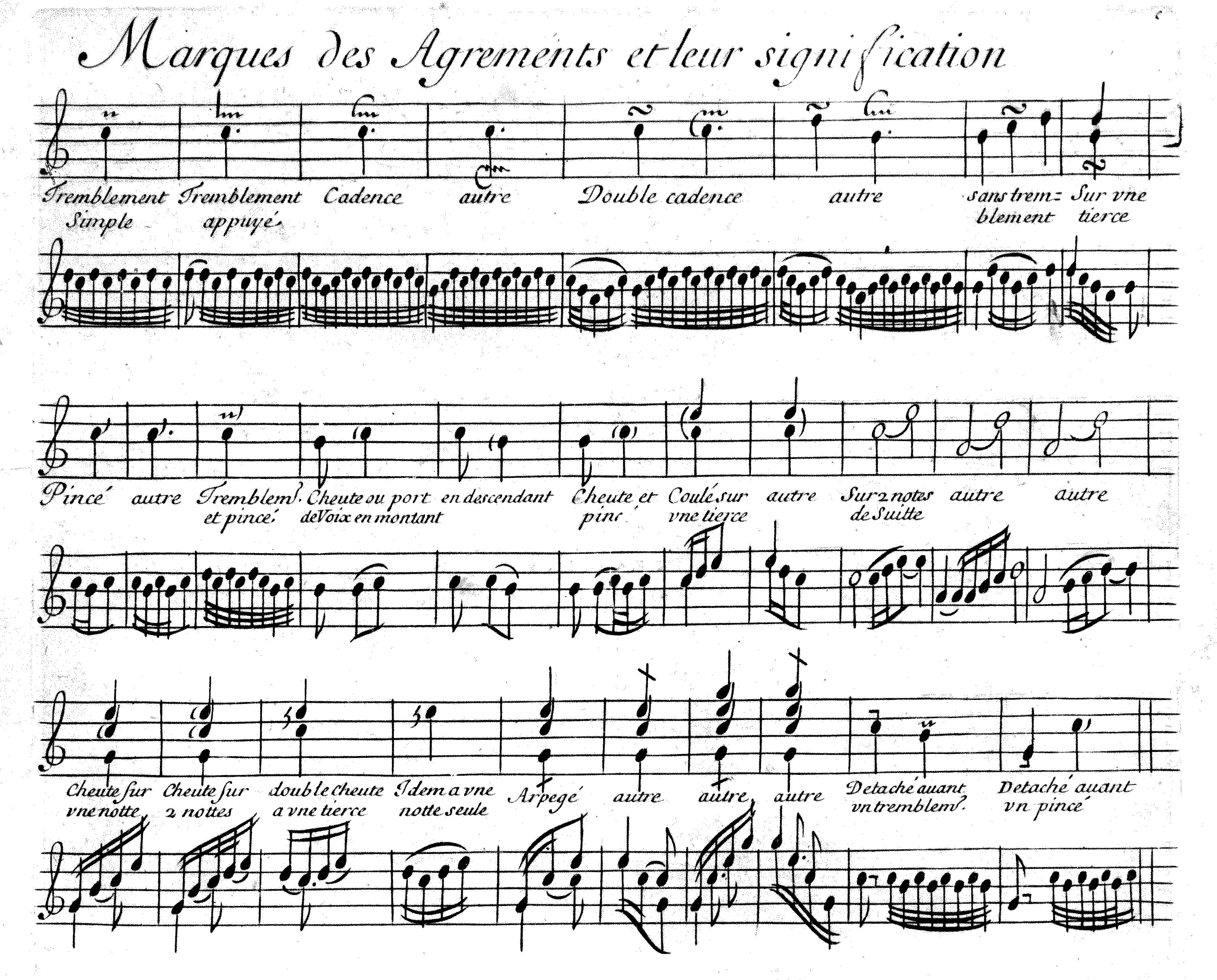
The complete table of ornaments from d'Anglebert's Pièces de clavecin.

D'Anglebert's principal work is a collection of four harpsichord suites published in 1689 in Paris under the title Pièces de clavecin. The volume is dedicated to Marie Anne de Bourbon, a talented amateur harpsichordist who later studied under François Couperin. Apart from its contents, which represents some of the finest achievements of the French harpsichord school (and show, among other things, D'Anglebert's thorough mastery of counterpoint and his substantial contribution to the genre of unmeasured prelude), Pièces de clavecin is historically important on several other counts. The collection was beautifully engraved with utmost care, which set a new standard for music engraving. Furthermore, D'Anglebert's table of ornaments is the most sophisticated before Couperin's (which only appeared a quarter of a century later, in 1713). It formed the basis of J.S. Bach's own table of ornaments (Bach copied D'Anglebert's table ca. 1710), and provided a model for other composers, including Rameau. Finally, D'Anglebert's original pieces are presented together with his arrangements of Lully's orchestral works. D'Anglebert's arrangements are, once again, some of the finest pieces in that genre, and show him experimenting with texture to achieve an orchestral sonority.

Most of D'Anglebert's other pieces survive in two manuscripts, one of which contains, apart from the usual dances, harpsichord arrangements of lute pieces by composers such as Ennemond Gaultier, Denis Gaultier, and René Mesangeau. They are unique pieces, for no such arrangements by other major French harpsichord composers are known. The second manuscript contains even more experimental pieces by D'Anglebert, in which he tried to invent a tablature-like notation for keyboard music to simplify the notation of style brisé textures.

D'Anglebert's only surviving organ works are five fugues and a quatuor (an old French term for a four-voice contrapuntal organ piece). The fugues all elaborate on variations of the same subject, thus forming an extended ricercare (or a miniature The Art of the Fugue). The quatuor, one of the few surviving pieces of its kind, is built around three themes derived from the Kyrie Cunctipotens; it is to be played on three keyboards and the pedal keyboard.
