= Tombeau =

Musical composition commemorating a notable death

A tombeau (plural tombeaux) is a musical composition (earlier, in the early 16th century, a poem) commemorating the death of a notable individual. The term derives from the French word for "tomb" or "tombstone". The vast majority of tombeaux date from the 17th century and were composed for lute or other plucked string instruments. The genre gradually fell out of use during the 18th century, but reappeared in the early 20th.

== History ==
"In instrumental music, tombeau signifies a musical 'tombstone' (French le tombeau = tomb). The musical genre of the tombeau is generally connected with music for the lute of the 17th and 18th centuries. Of some 60+ surviving pieces, most are intended for the lute or theorbo, 5 for the baroque guitar, 7 for the viola da gamba and 3 for harpsichord. The earliest example of this genre seems to be the Tombeau de Mezangeau (1638) by French lutenist Ennemond Gaultier."

"Musical predecessors are memorial pavans like those by Anthony Holborne (Countess of Pembrokes Funeralle, 1599). In France, where this musical genre emerged first, strong influence of literary models, particularly of memorial poems that were popular from the 16th to the end of the 17th centuries, may have been another important factor."

"The tombeau preeminently comes in two forms, as a slow elegiac allemande grave in 4/4 or as a pavan, a tri-partite renaissance dance already long out of date for the era of tombeaux, but with all the trappings of the allemande (cf. Denis Gaultier, Tombeau pour M. Racquette). There are also a few unique tombeaux that appear as gigues; that is because the gigue grave resembles the allemande in a number of respects."

"As opposed to the Italian lamento, the tombeau should not have used expressive elements of mourning, which were skeptically viewed in France. Nevertheless, certain typical onomatopoetic features were used: repeated note motifs depicting the knocking of Death at the door, ascending or descending diatonic or chromatic scales which depict the soul's tribulation and transcendence. Froberger's Lamentation on the Death of Ferdinand III or the Meditation sur ma Mort Future would be a prime example of such a form. Some tombeaux include a motif of four descending notes, a metaphor for grief given influential expression by John Dowland in his Lachrimae (1604). These genres offered many suitable expressive characteristics: the suspirans figure (a three-note upbeat), dotted rhythms, particularly in repeated notes, and slow-moving harmonies in the minor mode whose gravity is heightened by a tendency to settle on pedal points. Later examples also tend to use chromatic progressions related to the lamento bass. The few courante tombeaux exploit the same rhythmic features in triple metre."

"Developed by Parisian lutenists (Denis Gaultier, Charles Mouton, Jacques Gallot, François Dufault), the genre was soon taken over by clavecinists (Johann Jakob Froberger, Louis Couperin, both on the death of their friend Blancrocher in 1652) and was then spread into Central Europe (Jan Antonín Losy, Sylvius Leopold Weiss)."

The tombeau genre went into decline at the end of the 18th century. It reappeared in the 20th century with Maurice Ravel's Le Tombeau de Couperin (1919). Other 20th century tombeaux include Manuel de Falla's Le Tombeau de Debussy for solo guitar, Arthur Benjamin's Le Tombeau de Ravel for clarinet and piano, the last movement of Pli selon pli by Pierre Boulez, and Tombeau for Michael Collins (1987) by Mona Lyn Reese. Surely between the tombeau and the hommage the instrumental Cantus in Memoriam Benjamin Britten by Arvo Pärt and for Morton Feldman (1987) by Stephen L. Mosko. In the 21st century a series of tombeaux was written by Roman Turovsky-Savchuk.

== List of tombeaux ==
=== Lute and other plucked string instruments ===
- François Dufaut: Tombeau de Monsieur Blancrocher
- Jacques Gallot: Tombeau de Condé, Tombeau de Madame, Tombeau de Turenne
- Denis Gaultier: Tombeau de Monsieur Blancrocher, Tombeau de Mlle Gaultier, Tombeau de Mr. Lenclos, [Pavane ou] Tombeau de Mr. Raquette
- Ennemond Gaultier: Tombeau de Mezangeau
- Jan Antonín Losy: Tombeau
- Charles Mouton: Tombeau de Gogo, Tombeau de Madame,
- Robert de Visée: Tombeau de Mr. Francisque Corbet, Tombeau de Dubut, Tombeau du Vieux Gallot, Tombeau de Mr. Mouton, Le Tombeau [de Tonty], Tombeau de Mesdemoiselles de Visée
- Sylvius Leopold Weiss: Tombeau sur la mort de M. Cajetan Baron d'Hartig, Tombeau sur la mort de M. Comte de Losy
- Jacques de Saint-Luc: Tombeau sur la mort de Mr Francois Ginter
- Roman Turovsky-Savchuk: Tombeau sur la mort de Omelyan Kovch, Tombeau sur la mort de Petro Kalnyshevsky
- François Campion: Tombeau de Mr. de Maltot

=== Viola da gamba ===
- Charles Dollé: Tombeau de Marin Marais
- Marin Marais: Tombeau de M. Lully, Tombeau pour Marais le cadet, Tombeau de M. Meliton, Tombeau de M. de Ste-Colombe
- Monsieur de Sainte-Colombe: Tombeau 'Les regrets, Tombeau pour Monsieur de Sainte-Colombe le père
- Roman Turovsky-Savchuk: Tombeau de Telemann, Tombeau de Forqueray

=== Harpsichord ===
- Jean-Henri d'Anglebert: Tombeau de M. de Chambonnières
- Louis Couperin: Tombeau de Monsieur Blancrocher
- Johann Jakob Froberger: Tombeau fait à Paris sur la mort de Monsieur Blancrocher
- Mona Lyn Reese: Tombeau for Michael Collins
  Tombeau for Michael Collins by Mona Lyn Reese, performed by Barbara Day Turner.

=== Other instruments ===
- Maurice Ravel: Tombeau de Couperin
