= Perrine (music theorist) =

French music theorist and lute teacher

Perrine (died after 1698) was a French music theorist and lute teacher. He is only known by his surname. Three theoretical works by him are extant, all dealing with the practice of lute playing, which Perrine sought to revive by replacing the traditional lute tablature with staff notation:

- Livre de musique pour le lut, contenant une metode nouvelle et facile pour aprendre à toucher le lut sur les notes de la musique (Paris, 1679)
- Et une table pour aprendre à toucher le lut sur la basse continüe pour accompagner la voix (Paris, 1682, 1698)
- Pieces de luth en musique avec des regles pour les toucher parfaitement sur le luth et sur le clavessin (Paris, 1680)

The Livre discusses basso continuo performance, for which tablature was an obstacle. In 1682 Perrine published a table of realizations of cadence formulas in style brisé; this was the Livre's second part. Finally, the 1680 print, Pieces, contains 31 works by Ennemond and Denis Gaultier transcribed into staff notation. Perrine's transcriptions are an important key to studying the performance practice of the time.
