= Jacques de Saint-Luc =

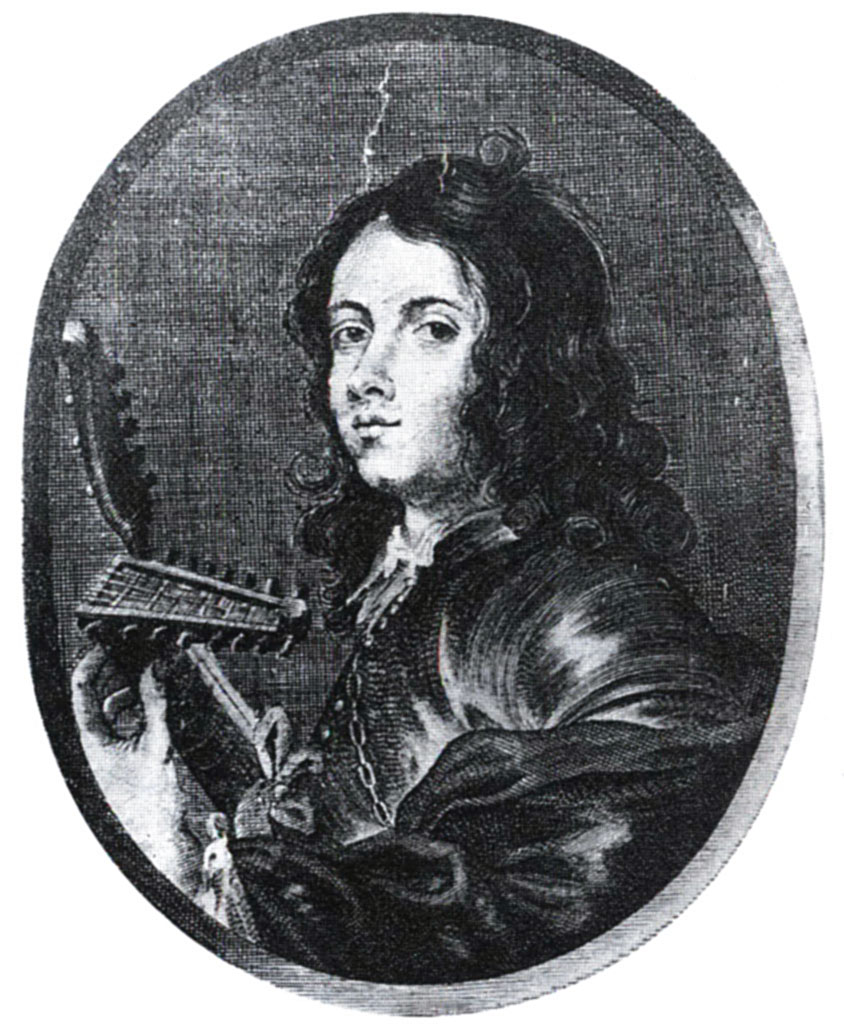
Jacques de Saint-Luc in a 1641 engraving by A. Vander Does (after Gerard Seghers)

Jacques (Lucas)de Saint-Luc (baptized 19 September 1616 – ca. 1710) was a Walloon lutenist and composer.

Saint-Luc was born in Ath in 1616; nothing is known about his early years. In 1639 he was invited to become a musician at the court in Brussels, and two years later he had his portrait painted by Gerard Seghers. He moved to Paris in the mid- or late 1640s, but returned to Brussels in October 1647. He evidently spent the next few decades in Brussels, marrying in 1658. An important correspondent of Saint-Luc's from these years was Constantijn Huygens. In August 1684 Saint-Luc was still living in Brussels, but nothing is known of his whereabouts during the next 16 years: the next mention of him is from 1700, when he visited Berlin on the occasion of the marriage of Prince Frederick of Hesse-Cassel and Princess Louise Dorothea of Prussia. He apparently traveled to Berlin from Vienna, where, according to contemporary sources, he was employed by Prince Eugene of Savoy. Saint-Luc was still alive in 1707 and 1708, when he published some of his compositions in Amsterdam; his date of death is unknown.

The long lifetime of at least 94 years aroused suspicions. And indeed, the booklet to a CD by Evangelina Mascardi proposes that some of the music attributed to Jacques was in fact composed by his son Laurent (born and baptised in Brussels in 1663), who was married in Vienna the 4th of May 1705 with Anna-Maria Masson (Österreichisches Musiklexikon). For this reason it's possible that some music and biographical information of Jacques have been attributed to Laurent and vice versa.

More than 200 pieces by Saint-Luc survive, and show that he was one of the most prominent lutenists of his time, beside Silvius Leopold Weiss of the same generation. Although he was influenced by French composers (Ennemond Gaultier, Denis Gaultier, Charles Mouton, and others) and adopted their scheme of grouping pieces into suites, he only used the characteristic French style brisé in his preludes.
