= Unmeasured prelude =

Unmeasured or non-measured prelude is a prelude in which the duration of each note is left to the performer. Typically the term is used for 17th century harpsichord compositions that are written without rhythm or metre indications, although various composers of the Classical music era were composing small preludes for woodwind instruments using non-measured notation well into the 19th century. The form resurfaced in the aleatory music of the 20th century, where various other aspects of performance are also left to free interpretation.

== Unmeasured preludes for lute ==
The first unmeasured preludes appeared during the Renaissance era. They were short improvised compositions for lute, usually performed as an introduction to another piece of music or to test the instrument. Later unmeasured lute preludes retained the improvisatory character of the genre but became more complex and lengthy. Unmeasured preludes flourished into full-fledged compositions by the middle of the 17th century. However the development of lute music had already stopped by that time and the last surviving unmeasured lute preludes date from the end of the same century.

Important lute composers who contributed to the development of the unmeasured prelude include Pierre Gaultier, René Mesangeau and Germain Pinel.

== Unmeasured preludes for harpsichord ==
A sample of Louis Couperin's unique notation for unmeasured preludes.

Unmeasured preludes for harpsichord started appearing around 1650. Louis Couperin is usually credited as the first composer to embrace the genre. Couperin wrote unmeasured preludes using long groups of whole notes, and these groups were connected by long curves. This kind of notation is found in Couperin's unmeasured preludes and was also done by Élisabeth Jacquet de la Guerre. Another important contribution to the development of the genre was made by Nicolas Lebègue, who used diverse note values in his unmeasured preludes. The first ever published unmeasured preludes appeared in Lebègue's Le pieces de clavessin in 1677.

The unmeasured harpsichord prelude became a typical French genre, used by many famous composers including Jean-Philippe Rameau, Jean-Henri d'Anglebert, Louis Marchand and Élisabeth Jacquet de la Guerre. Unmeasured preludes were also present in the works of German composers who were influenced by French style. Of these, Johann Caspar Ferdinand Fischer was one of the first to use unmeasured preludes in harpsichord suites. One instance of unmeasured prelude by Giovanni Battista Draghi is an example of the genre in English harpsichord music.

François Couperin's didactic L'art de toucher le clavecin (1716) contained eight preludes that, while unmeasured and improvisatory in nature, were measured for teaching purposes. These pieces, along with several preludes from Nicolas Siret's Second Livre de Pieces de Clavecin (1719), were among the last unmeasured harpsichord preludes written.

Cinquieme Prelude
from L'art de toucher le Clavecin by François Couperin, performed by Robert Schröter on a harpsichord tuned in equal temperament

Cinquieme Prelude
The same work performed in a reconstructed tuning of "temperament ordinaire", which could have been used in France during Couperin's time
