= François Roberday =

French organist and composer

François Roberday (21 March 1624 – 13 October 1680) was a French Baroque organist and composer. One of the last exponents of the French polyphonic music tradition established by Jean Titelouze and Louis Couperin, Roberday is best remembered today for his Fugues et caprices, a collection of four-part contrapuntal organ pieces.

== Life ==
He was born in Paris in 1624, most probably in March. His family was one of goldsmiths and musicians: his father, a renowned goldsmith, owned a pipe organ and François himself was the brother-in-law of Jean-Henri d'Anglebert, one of the most famous French composers and harpsichordist to the King of France. After his father's death, Roberday was appointed King's goldsmith, and in 1659 he bought the job of the official manservant to the Queen. Unfortunately, Roberday's business gradually declined and by the time of his death he was quite poor. He died in 1680 in Auffargis, a village south of Paris, during an epidemic.

Roberday was organist of several churches in Paris, most notably the Notre-Dame des Victoires church and the Petits-Pères church. He was also known as a teacher, and Jean-Baptiste Lully may have been one of his pupils.

== Works ==
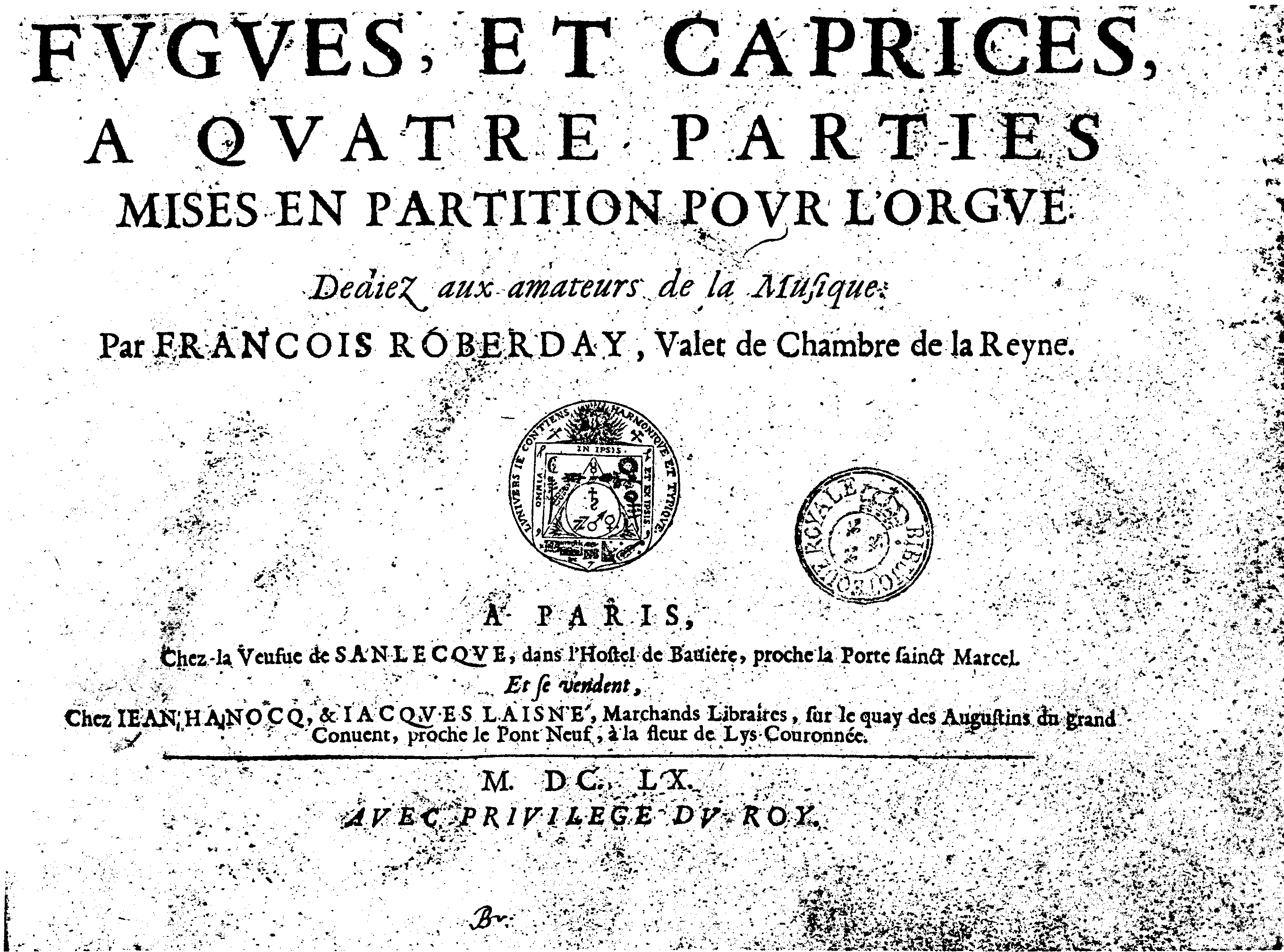
Facsimile of the title page of the original printed edition of Roberday's Fugues et caprices.

Roberday's only extant work is Fugues et caprices, a collection of organ pieces published in 1660 in Paris. The collection includes twelve four-voice fugues, of which numbers 1, 2, 3, 6, 8 and 9 are paired with caprices, based on the subjects of their corresponding fugues, which he instructs to be played 'at discretion and very slowly'. These too feature four-part counterpoint, although slightly less complex than that in the fugues. The fugues use subjects with extensive usage of longer note values, which are modified in the caprices to better suit their fast tempi. Many of the pieces feature multiple sections, with a few double fugues and some variation fugues present.

The collection shows considerable Italian influence and many of the pieces are based on themes from miscellaneous composers of the era, including Girolamo Frescobaldi, Louis Couperin, Jean-Henri d'Anglebert, Johann Jakob Froberger, Francesco Cavalli and others. Some researchers (notably Jordi Savall) regard Fugues et caprices as an important precursor to Johann Sebastian Bach's The Art of Fugue. Since the pieces of the collection are non-liturgical, they make Roberday one of the last composers of the French polyphonic tradition.

== See also ==
- French organ school
