= Jacques Gaultier =

French lutenist and composer

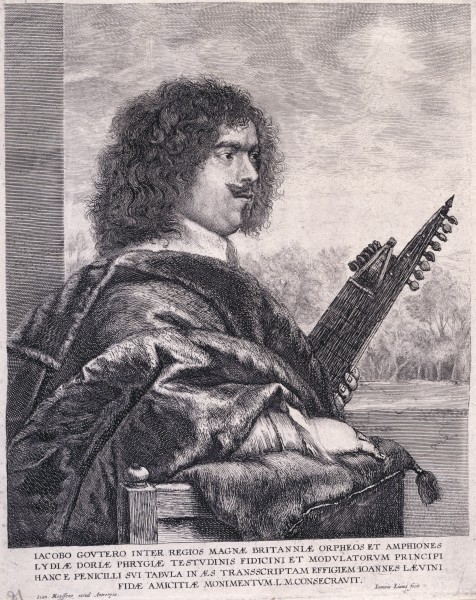
Jacques Gaultier, engraving by Jan Lievens (1632)

Jacques Gaultier (or Gauterius, Gouterus, Goutier, Gautier, Gautier d'Angleterre, also James Gwaltier) (born ca. 1600, fl. 1617 – 1652) was a French Baroque lutenist and composer. He was not related to the composers and lutenists Denis Gaultier and Ennemond Gaultier.

Not much is known about his early life. In 1617, he had to leave France due to a duel and he escaped to England. He enjoyed the patronage of George Villiers, the favourite of James I of England. In 1622, Gaultier met Dutch poet and composer Constantijn Huygens, with whom he engaged in an exchange of letters. He joined the household of Prince Charles and went to Spain in 1623 with Charles and Buckingham during the "Spanish Match".

From 1625, he was a musician at the English royal court under Charles I of England. He remained there at least until 1640 as he appears as an employee in the court records for that year. In 1627, he was arrested and imprisoned in the Tower of London for a while. There were rumours that he was involved in a plot to assassinate the Duke of Buckingham or had seduced a young lady.

In 1630, he travelled to the Netherlands. From there he went to Madrid to play at the Spanish court. In the early 1630s, Gaultier returned to England. Then he was employed again as a court musician, among others, at the performances of the masques The Triumph of Peace (1634) by James Shirley and William Davenant's Britannia triumphans (1637).

In April 1645 Constantijn Huygens was trying to obtain a nine rib Laux Maler lute to accompany singing. Gaultier said there were only fifty extant, six in London, all of medium size and not suitable to accompany a singer. Soon after Gaultier found one of the larger sizes, recently rebuilt in London by a Master Nichols. Huygens had the lute sent to him on approval but did not buy it. In 1649 Charles I gave Gaultier another Laux Maler lute, formerly belonging to the royal lutenist John Ballard. Gaultier offered this lute to Huygens and sent it to The Hague but could not secure an expert recommendation for it from their mutual friend Mary Woodhouse.

Like several royal servants, in 1651 Gaultier was paid compensation (£150) for unpaid wages by the Commonwealth Committee for the Sale of Late King's Goods.
