= Style brisé =

Texture of instrumental music of the French Baroque

Style brisé (French: "broken style") is a general term for irregular arpeggiated texture in instrumental music of the Baroque period. It is commonly used in discussion of music for lute, keyboard instruments, or the viol.

The original French term, in use around 1700, is style luthé ("lute style"). It was used by François Couperin when referring to arpeggiated textures in his pieces such as La Mézangère, Les Charmes and Les Barricades Mystérieuses. Continuous pieces with an abundance of irregularly broken chords originated in French lute music of the 17th century. The modern term style brisé was first used by scholar Lionel de La Laurencie when discussing the style of two French lutenists – Ennemond Gaultier (c.1575–1651) and Denis Gaultier (1603–1672). La Laurencie may have simply translated the corresponding German term, which has been used since at least the early 18th century.

In his 1972 study of French lute music, scholar Wallace Rave compiled a list of features he believed to be characteristic of style brisé. Rave's list included the following:

- the avoidance of textural pattern and regularity in part writing
- arpeggiated chord textures with irregular distribution of individual notes of the chord
- ambiguous melodic lines
- rhythmic displacement of notes within a melodic line
- octave changes within melodic line
- irregular phrase lengths

As shown by later studies by David J. Buch, such features may appear in moderation, or be completely absent from certain pieces that still feature some irregular arpeggiation, for example in accompaniment to a regularly constructed melodic line: a scheme found already in Denis Gaultier's works. Another key feature of style brisé pointed out by Buch is the adoption of imitative or pseudo-imitative textures.

Early 17th-century examples include the collection Le trésor d’Orphée (1600) by Antoine Francisque, Robert Ballard's lute books of 1611 and 1614, and other publications of the time. Idiomatic lute figurations found in such pieces were later transferred to the harpsichord in the works of numerous composers: particularly important examples include Louis Couperin's unmeasured preludes, Johann Jakob Froberger's allemandes, free preludes by Jean-Henri d'Anglebert and Louis-Nicolas Clérambault, and others. By the early 18th century various forms of style brisé were common techniques in keyboard music. Johann Pachelbel's Hexachordum Apollinis, which was among the most successful keyboard publications of the time, included a number of variations in style brisé.
