= Jan Antonín Losy =

Jan Antonín Losy, Count of Losinthal (German: Johann Anton Losy von Losinthal); also known as Comte d'Logy (Losi or Lozi), (c. 1650 – 22 August 1721) was a Bohemian aristocrat, Baroque lute player and composer from Prague. His lute works combine the French style brisé with a more Italian cantabile style. He was probably the most significant lutenist-composer in Bohemia at the height of the lute's popularity there.

== Life ==
Count Losy's family were of Swiss origin (Poschiavo in the canton of Graubünden). His father, Johann Anton Losy senior (c. 1600–1682), was perhaps born in Purz in the Swiss canton of Grisons. By 1627 he had moved to Bohemia and purchased a house in Prague. Losy senior had a number of business interests and was appointed a Councillor of the Exchequer and Deputy of the Salt, Beer and Wine Council by the Bohemian Court Chamber. As a result of helping to defend Prague against the assault of Swedish troops in 1648, Losy senior was ennobled, becoming a baronet in 1648 and Count von Losinthal in 1655. He also acquired the estate and castle at Steken (Strakonitz District, southern Bohemia) in 1638.

Johann Anton Losy was born at Steken around 1650. He had a younger twin brother (Johann Baptist) and also had four sisters. Losy's interest in music was fostered by his lute teacher and valet Achazius Kazimir Huelse who seems to have remained a lifelong friend.

Losy attended the Charles-Ferdinand University in Prague, gaining his baccalaureate in 1667 and graduating as a Doctor of Philosophy on 15 August 1668. He then seems to have travelled to a number of European countries including Italy. His intimate knowledge of French lute style indicates he may have been in Paris and met lutenists such as Mouton and Dufault.

Following the death of his father on 22 July 1682 he inherited his title, becoming the second Count Losy. He also inherited part of the family estates and an Imperial appointment as a Councillor of the Kingdom of Bohemia. His official position meant that, while living in Prague, he frequently had to travel to the Imperial court in Vienna. In the following year, his twin brother died.

As an aristocrat, Count Losy's musical activities would have been expected to remain on an amateur basis. Nevertheless, he seems to have gained the admiration of a number of professional musicians for his lute-playing and compositions. In 1697 he took part in a musical contest with Leipzig cantor Johann Kuhnau. While working in Prague in 1715, Gottfried Heinrich Stölzel met Count Losy who "played the lute as well as one who makes a profession of it" and also played the violin. There is no evidence he played other instruments, although there is a rather rich source of transcriptions of his lute compositions for other instruments available (baroque guitar, keyboard, angélique, mandora, and violin).

In spite of Losy's outstanding reputation as a player and improviser on the lute, only one of his works was published in his own lifetime. This was the Courante Extra-ordinaire, which was part of the collection Cabinet der Lauten, published in 1695 by Philippe Franz Lasage de Richée.

After Losy's death in Prague in 1721, the great German lutenist Sylvius Leopold Weiss paid tribute to his colleague by dedicating to his memory the work Tombeau sur la mort de Monseigneur Comte de Logi.

He was married to Franziska Claudia Gräfin von Strassoldo. After his death in 1721, his son Adam Philipp Losy von Losinthal, an Austrian statesman, General Building Director, Knight in the Order of the Golden Fleece and also a gifted musician, inherited all his estates.

== Works ==
Losy composed mostly dance suites, as was typical of his time, but sometimes attempted larger works such as those in the three-part overture style popularized by Jean-Baptiste Lully. Inspired by French and Italian composers, Losy mastered French lute style and his extant works demonstrate his intelligence, noblesse, bright spirit and love for the lute.

His extensive and highly creative works are scattered through various archives in the Czech Republic, France, Germany and Austria. One of his manuscripts, a collection of pieces written for the 5-string Baroque guitar, is housed in the National Library of the Czech Republic in Prague. However, the identification and verification of Losy's works is anything but straightforward. Prague lute player Emil Vogl created a list that has been extended by further discoveries and concordances by Tim Crawford. There are no critical complete editions of Losy's works in CNRS style, so it is possible that additional works will be discovered and cataloged.
