= Elias Mertel =

German musician

Elias Mertel (also Mertelius, Martelius; c. 1561–1626) was a German lutenist, composer and intabulator of the Late Renaissance era. He was originally from Wangenbourg.

In the dedication of his famous lute music compendium Hortus Musicalis, he said he had been in the employ of Frederick IV, Elector Palatine until 1595.

On 27 January 1596, Mertel married in Strasbourg. On 23 December became a citizen of Strasbourg. He became financial manager (treasurer) in the Academy of Strasbourg.

He was summoned by Frederick IV, Elector Palatine to Heidelberg to play at celebrations there four times between 1600 and 1606.

Selections of lute music attributed to Elias Mertel are found in the Testudo Gallo Germanica by Georg Leopold Fuhrmann (1615) and Jean-Baptiste Besard's Thesaurus Harmonicus (two galliards) (1603).

He published collections of lute music, notably Hortus Musicalis in Strasbourg in 1615 including 235 preludes, and 120 fantasias and fugues. Authorship of the individual works is uncertain. In the introduction, he said he intentionally did not attribute composer names to avoid prejudicing the lute player and to avoid problems of misattribution. Nine preludes and six fantasies from Hortus Musicalis are also in another lute song compendium Thesaurus Gratiarum compiled by Johann Daniel Mylius (1622).
