= Charles Fleury =

French lutenist

Charles Fleury, Sieur de Blancrocher (c. 1605 – November 1652) was a French lutenist. Known principally under the name Blancrocher (Blanrocher, Blancheroche), he was one of the leading performers of his day, active in Paris. Whether he composed or not is unknown; a single dance movement, titled L'Offrende, survives, attributed to him, in both the so-called Manuscrit Vaudry de Saizenay (MS 279.152) at Besançon's municipal library (where it is labelled as a Gigue) and manuscript MS G.618 at Oxford's Bodleian Library (where it is labelled instead as an Allemande). His name became well known in the late 20th century, for after his sudden death (he fell down a flight of stairs) as many as four major composers wrote tombeaux in his memory: lutenists Denis Gaultier and François Dufaut, and harpsichordists Louis Couperin and Johann Jakob Froberger. The latter witnessed Blancrocher's death, and the lutenist apparently died in Froberger's arms.

He was the son of Louis, Valet de chambre du roi, and Mathurine de Vallois (+1625). He left six children underage. His son Charles married Anne de Franchere or de Fransure in 1633.

== Tombeaux on Blancrocher's death ==
- Louis Couperin: Tombeau de Monsieur Blancrocher (in the Bauyn manuscript)
- François Dufaut: Tombeau de Monsieur Blancrocher
- Johann Jakob Froberger: FbWV 632 — Tombeau in C minor (Tombeau fait à Paris sur la mort de Monsieur Blancrocher)
- Denis Gaultier: Tombeau de Monsieur Blancrocher (also known as Andromède, an allemande in A major from La Rhetorique des dieux)
