= Hans Neusidler =

German composer and lutenist

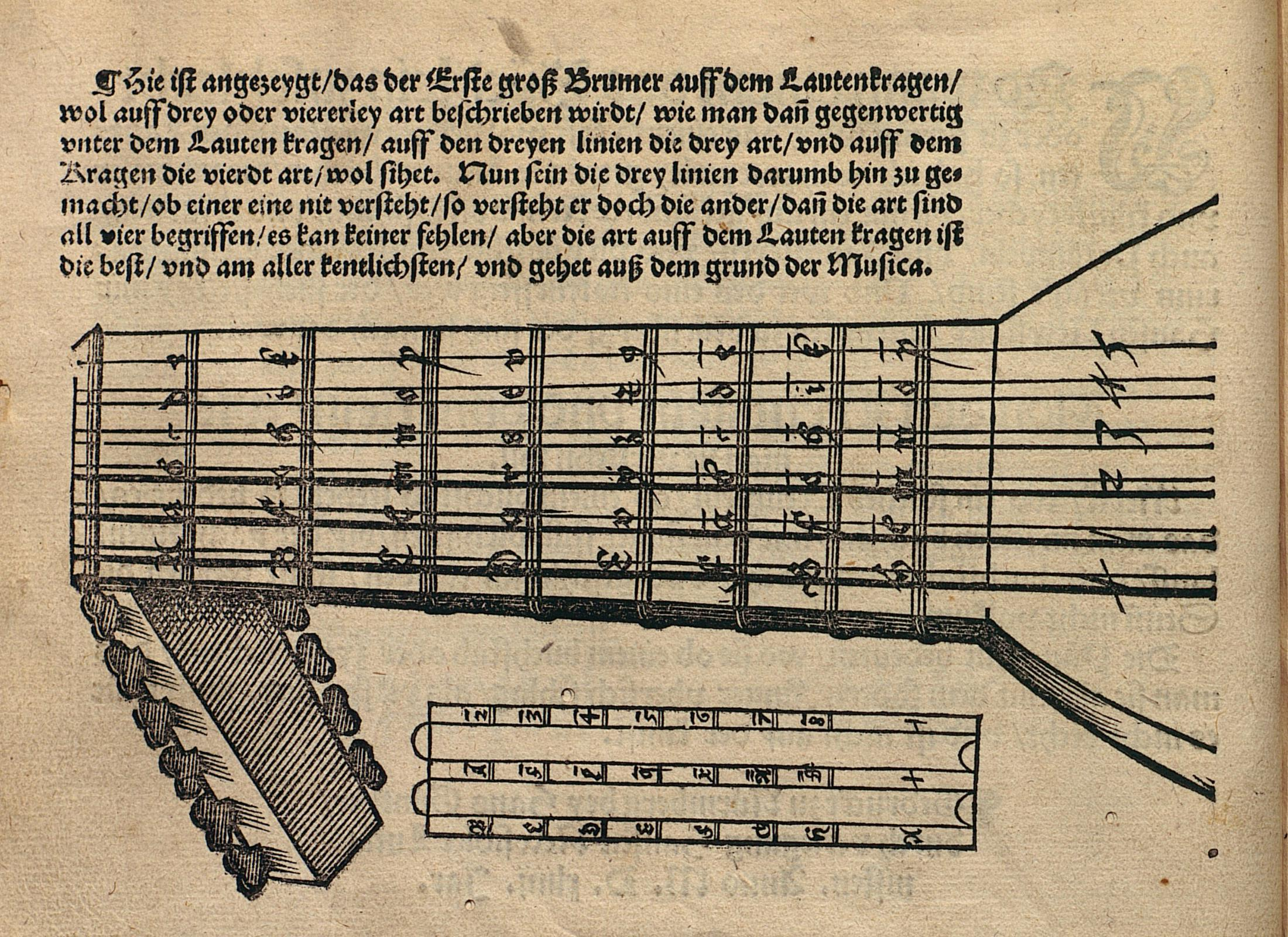

Hans Neusidler (also Neusiedler, Newsidler) (c.1508 – 2 February 1563), was a German composer and lutenist of the Renaissance.

== Life ==
Neusidler was born in Pressburg (today Bratislava, Slovakia) and first enters the historical record in 1530, when he settled in Nuremberg, Germany. He was issued a residence permit by the city council in February and married there in September. In April 1531, he became a citizen and soon after bought a house on the Zotenberg. He taught lute there in the 1530s, publishing eight books of lute music between 1536 and 1549, and also went into business as a luthier by 1550. He fathered thirteen children with his first wife, which resulted in his having enormous financial troubles; he eventually sold his house to pay his debts. In January 1556, his wife died, and he remarried five months later; his second wife bore him four more children before her death in August 1562. Neusidler died in Nuremberg.

Hans's sons, Melchior Neusidler (1531–1590) and Konrad Neusidler (1541-after 1604) were also well-known lutenists and composers.

== Works ==
Neusidler, along with Hans Judenkünig and Hans Gerle, was one of the most important early German lutenists. His eight publications feature intabulations of German songs, French chansons, Italian madrigals, dance pieces, and preludes of an improvisatory nature. Most of the works are in three parts, but there are two-part pieces for beginners and a few four-part arrangements in two of his publications. He republished popular works with newer arrangements in his later books. The initial 1536 publication, which was a beginner's collection, opens with a written introduction to lute playing which gives insight into contemporaneous performance practice.

A somewhat infamous piece is Der Juden Tanz, often cited as an example of bitonality "not lacking a touch of satire". It was first transcribed in Denkmäler der Tonkunst in Österreich and appears in Davison & Apel's Historical Anthology of Music as a melody in a sort of diminished D ♯ accompanied by an E/B drone. Apel gives a facsimile of the tablature in The Notation of Polyphonic Music that includes Neusidler's scordatura instructions, but he interprets "die Obrer quint saitten muß man dem t gleich ziehen" (with the "fifth" string being the chanterelle and "t" the lowest drone) as requiring the tuning G-d-d-a-d-'f'♯. If instead the outer strings are tuned to the same pitch the piece sounds rather more typical of the rest of Neusidler's work.

== Publications ==
All publications are for lute and were published in Nuremberg.

- Ein newgeordent künstlich Lautenbuch in zwen Theyl getheylt: der erst für die anfahenden Schuler (1536)
- Der ander Theil des Lautenbuchs: darin sind begriffen vil ausserlesner kunstreycher Stuck von Fantaseyen, Preambeln, Psalmen, und Muteten … auff die Lauten dargeben (1536)
- Ein newes Lautenbüchlein mit vil schonen Liedern (1540)
- Das erst Buch: ein newes Lautenbüchlein mit vil feiner lieblichen Liedern für die jungen Schuler (1544)
- Das ander Buch: ein new künstlich Lautten Buch für die anfahenden Schuler (1544)
- Das dritt Buch: ein new kunstlich Lauten Buch darin vil trefflicher … Kunst Stück von Psalmen und Muteten (1544)
- Das erst Buch: ein newes Lautenbüchlein mit vil feiner lieblichen Liedern, für die jungen Schuler (1547)
- Das ander Buch: ein new künstlich Lauten Buch erst yetzo von newem gemacht für junge und alte Schüler (1549)

== Recordings ==
- 2022 - Hans Neusidler. Lute Music. Yavor Genov. Brilliant Classics 96456
- 2005 – Obrecht. Chansons, Songs, Motets. Capilla Flamenca and Piffaro. Eufoda 1361.
- 2017 - "Italian Dance". An Equal Sea. J. M. Smig.
- 2008 - Paul O'Dette Lute Music Melchior Neusidler Harmonia Mundi
