= Bernhard Joachim Hagen =

Bernhard Joachim Hagen (April 1720 in or near Hamburg (?) – 9 December 1787 in Ansbach) was a German composer, lutenist and violinist. He was the last important composer of lute music in 18th-century Germany.

== Life ==
Little is known about his youth, but he grew up in a musical family; his brother Peter Albrecht Hagen (also called Peter Albert van Hagen, 1714 - 12 September 1777) studied the violin with Francesco Geminiani, learned to play the lute and organ, and was an organist in Rotterdam. There are several transcriptions of Geminiani's violin works for lute by J.B. Hagen extant.

The younger Bernhard Joachim Hagen must have learned to play lute and violin early too, for in 1737 he was already employed as an assistant to Bayreuth violin virtuoso and Kapellmeister Johann Pfeiffer; later he was listed officially as a court violinist. He kept this position at the Bayreuth and since 1769 at the Ansbach court until his death. Adam Falckenhagen and Charles Durant (Karol Duranowski), also called to the Bayreuth court by Wilhelmine of Bayreuth, may have further trained him in playing the lute.

In 1745, Hagen married Anna Fikentscher (born in Bayreuth; died 22 May 1789 in Ansbach). During 1760/1761 he visited his brother in Rotterdam and there gave five concerts from November till March.

== Works ==
Hagen was employed at the Bayreuth court as a violinist and as a lutenist, and his virtuoso lute performances and his compositions for lute were known and appreciated. He is one of the most important composers for the lute in the era following Sylvius Leopold Weiss, and far more important than his teachers Falckenhagen and Durant. His style is shaped by the Empfindsamkeit and the beginning of the Sturm und Drang period. There is a discernible influence of Carl Philipp Emmanuel Bach in Hagen's music.

Through Margravine Wilhelmine's efforts, lute music flourished in the 18th century one last time before being rediscovered in the 20th century.

There are 33 known compositions by Bernhard Joachim Hagen found in the Staats- und Stadtbibliothek Augsburg:

- 12 Sonatas for Lute solo
- 6 Trios for Lute, Violin and Violoncello
- 2 Lute concerti
- 1 Duo for two Lutes
- 1 Duo for Lute and Violin
- Many Lute arrangements of compositions by Geminiani, Locatelli, Arne, and others.

The facsimile editions of Hagen's solo lute sonatas (1983) and chamber works (1984) have been published by Joachim Domning for the Roman Trekel Musikverlag.

There are three acclaimed CD recordings of Hagen's sonatas by the lutenist Robert Barto:

- Joachim Bernhard Hagen, Solo Works for Lute: Five Sonatas, Locatelli Variations (Naxos 8.554200)
- Bernhard Joachim Hagen, Sonate à Liuto solo (Symphonia Sy98164)
- Hagen: The Augsburg Manuscript Music for lute (Pan Classics PC10267)

Some of Hagen's works listed in the 1769 Breitkopf catalog (these have no concordances in Augsburg manuscripts) are presumed missing.

== Influence ==
The lute sonatas of Roman Turovsky-Savchuk (a contemporary lutenist-composer) were written in homage to Hagen.

== Literature & Sources ==
- Ernst Ludwig Gerber: Historisch-biographisches Lexicon der Tonkünstler, Teil 1. (1790)
- Rainer Trübsbach: Geschichte der Stadt Bayreuth. Druckhaus Bayreuth (1993)
- Robert Barto: Bernhard Joachim Hagen, Sonate à Liuto solo CD Booklet (1999)
- Per Kjetil Farstad: Bernhard Joachim Hagen (1720-87): Some New Biographical Information, in: The Lute. Journal of the Lute Society, Vol. 40 (2000), p. 1-11.
