= Wolfgang Ebner =

German composer

Wolfgang Ebner (1612–1665) was a German baroque composer. He was a Viennese court organist in the latter years of the reign of Ferdinand III, Holy Roman Emperor, and then of Leopold I, Holy Roman Emperor.

Ebner was born in Augsburg. He may have preceded Johann Heinrich Schmelzer as ballet master at the court. He died in Vienna.

His 'Capriccio sopra l’aria Bergamasco' opens Handel's Attick, a clavichord recording played by Julian Perkins.
