= Jacques Bittner =

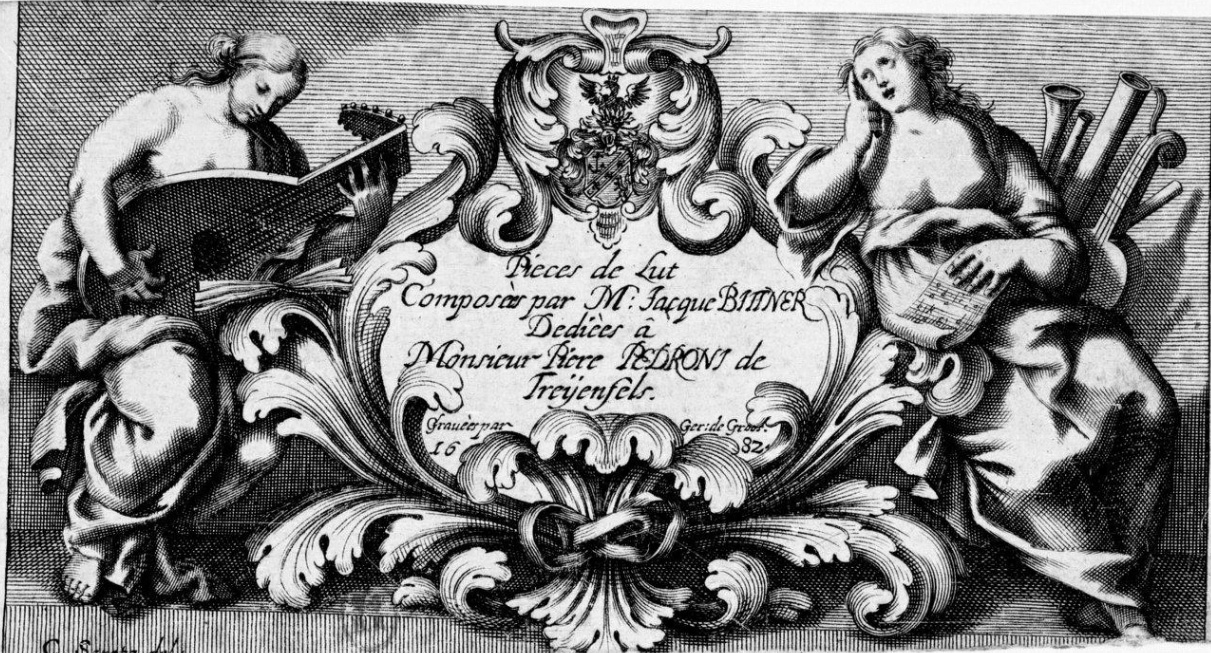
Title page of Bittner's Pièces de lut, published in Nuremberg, 1682

Jacob Büttner, widely known by the French version of his name Jacques Bittner, (floruit 1680s) was a lutenist and composer of Austro-Bohemian origin. He published 170 pieces for lute in Nuremberg in 1682 and 1683. Little is known about his life, although his music continues to be played and recorded in modern times. The German lutenist and conductor Konrad Junghänel recorded many of his works in 1984.

The 18th century lutenist Ernst Gottlieb Baron described Bittner briefly (although with some inaccuracies) in his 1727 Untersuchung des Instruments der Lauten. According to Baron, Bittner's music was composed "according to the latest and most galant method of playing the lute at that time." The Bittner lute music published in Nuremberg in 1682 has a French title: Pièces de lut. It also contains Bittner's dedication to the Prague-based Italian banker Pierre Pedroni de Treyenfels, whom Bittner described as his patron, and two anonymous sonnets in praise of the composer. Both the dedication (signed "Giacomo Bittner") and the sonnets are in Italian. A second collection of Bittner's music was published in Nuremberg in 1683 under the German title, Galantheste Methode die Laute zu traktieren.
