= David Kellner =

German organist and theorist

David Kellner (1670 – 6 April 1748) was a German organist, composer and theorist of the Baroque period and a contemporary of Bach. He is primarily known for his music theory treatise Treulicher Unterricht im General-Bass (1732), which was highly popular due to its brevity; it is primarily based on the massive treatises by Johann Mattheson and Johann David Heinichen.

== Life and career ==
Kellner was born in Liebertwolkwitz, near Leipzig in the Electorate of Saxony.

Apart from compositions for the lute, which are today highly regarded, he wrote on the theory of music and particularly on writing for equal temperament. His diagram of the circle of fifths is the earliest extant example of the modern layout with major keys and minor keys in two concentric circles, the major immediately outside its relative minor.
