= François de Chancy =

French singer and composer (1600-1656)

François de Chancy (1600 – 1656) was a French singer lutenist and composer. He was a master of music for Cardinal Richelieu in 1631, master of chamber music (1635) and was chamber musician of the King's Chapel (1649). François de Chancy was highly regarded by Mersenne, who included Chancy pieces in his treatises. He died in Paris in his mid-fifties.

He participated and collaborated on vocal music of the following ballets de cour:

- Ballet de la prospérité des armes de France, 1641
- Ballet du dérèglement des passions, 1648
- Ballet des fêtes de Bacchus, 1651

== Publications ==
He was noted in following publications:

- Tablature de mandore (pub. 1629) in Paris with Ballard
- 12 lute pieces in Tablature de luth de différents auteurs sur des accords nouveaux, (pub. 1631)
- two books of Airs de cour à 4 parties (pub. 1635, 1644), the 1st and 2nd Livre d'Équivoques (pub. 1640, 1647) and 3rd, 4th and 5th Livre de chansons (pub. 1649, 1651, 1655).

The other airs and tablatures are included in books of Chansons pour danser et pour boire (Paris: Ballard, 1660) and of Mss. M. Mersenne, in L'Harmonie universelle, in two German books (tablature for lute and tablature for mandore).

== Bibliography ==
- Marc Honegger (ed.): Dictionnaire de la musique (Paris: Bordas, 1986), p. 231.
