= Paulo Galvão =

Portuguese musician

Paulo Galvão (born 1967 in Portimão, Algarve, Portugal) is a composer, lutenist, theorbist and guitarist. According to Dan Hill, Galvão has published "musical forgeries" for baroque guitar under the name "Antonio da Costa". Galvão's works have been performed by Marcello Vitale and Marco Meloni.

== Biography ==
Paulo Galvão had his first musical studies at the Escola de Música de Grupo Coral de Lagos. He later studied classical guitar, lute, theorbo, and baroque guitar with Manuel Morais at the National Conservatory in Lisbon. He had further professional studies with Ede Roth, Hopkinson Smith, Jakob Lindberg and Carlo Marchione.

== Discography ==
- O Cancioneiro de Elvas. Vitor Lima, sång, Joaquin Galvão, blockflöjt, Paulo Galvão, luta. Musicália M.01.01.004
- Duo Galvão. Recital. Vivaldi, Ortiz, Molino, Rodil, Galvão. Joaquin Galvão, flöjter, Paulo Galvão, gitarr, vihuela, luta, teorb. Musicália M.01.01.001
- O Livro de Guitarra do Conde de Redondo - Guitar Book of the Count Redondo, Label: Musicalia ASIN: B00005425I
- Duo Galvão - Música Portuguesa para Flauta e Violão
