= Julien Perrichon =

French composer and lutenist

Julien (Jean) Perrichon (6 November 1566 – c.1600) was a French composer and lutenist of the late Renaissance. He was a lute player for Henry IV of France and mentioned by Marin Mersenne in Harmonie universelle (1636) as one of the finest musicians of the preceding age.

He was born in Paris. His father, Jehan Perrichon, was a viol and shawm player, also for the royal court. As a child, Jehan probably learned to play the lute from the king's lutenist. Court records mention him as a student of the lute from 1576 to 1578, at which time he was likely studying with Jean de la Fontaine or Samuel de La Roche, who were then the king's lutenists. Records indicate Perrichon was formally the valet de chambre to Henry IV sometime before 1595, a position he likely retained until his early death around 1600

All of Perrichon's surviving music is for lute. It includes dances in the prevailing styles, such as courantes, galliards, voltas, as well as preludes. Most of his music was published after his death, and it was distributed in Germany and England, as well as his native France. Michael Praetorius included his music in a collection in Germany. Robert Dowland included one of his corantos in the English collection Varietie of Lute-lessons (1610), inadvertently attributing it to his father Jehan.

== Media ==
"Volte"
A dance, originally written for lute, performed on the clavichord.

== Bibliography ==
- Inglefield, Ruth K. (2001). "Perrichon, Julien". Grove Music Online (8th ed.). Oxford University Press. doi:10.1093/gmo/9781561592630.article.21366. ISBN 978-1-56159-263-0. (subscription, Wikilibrary access, or UK public library membership required)
