= Johann Kropfgans =

German lutenist and composer

Johann Kropfgans (Kropffgans, Kropffganss; 14 October 1708 – c. 1770) was a German lutenist and composer.

Kropfgans was born in Breslau into the family of Johann Kropfgans Sr. He and his siblings Johanna Eleonora (b. 1710) and Johann Gottfried (b. 1714) all played the lute from a young age. He was a pupil of Silvius Leopold Weiss, with whom he visited Johann Sebastian Bach in 1739.

Kropfgans composed in the homophonic galant style. He wrote solo lute music as well as chamber music.

== Bibliography ==
- Farstad, Per Kjetil, German galant lute music in the 18th century, Göteborg University, Dept. of Musicology, 2000, ISBN 9185974552, p. 333
- Bukofzer, Manfred F., Music in the Baroque Era, from Monteverdi to Bach, W.W. Norton & Company, November 1947, ISBN 0393097455
- The New Grove Dictionary of Music and Musicians, Groves Dictionaries, Inc., January 2004, ISBN 0195170679
- The Oxford Dictionary of Music, Oxford University Press, 2012, ISBN 0199578109
