= Ludovico Roncalli =

Italian composer

Count Ludovico Giuseppe Antonio Filippo Roncalli, or simply Count Ludovico (1654–1713), was an Italian composer.

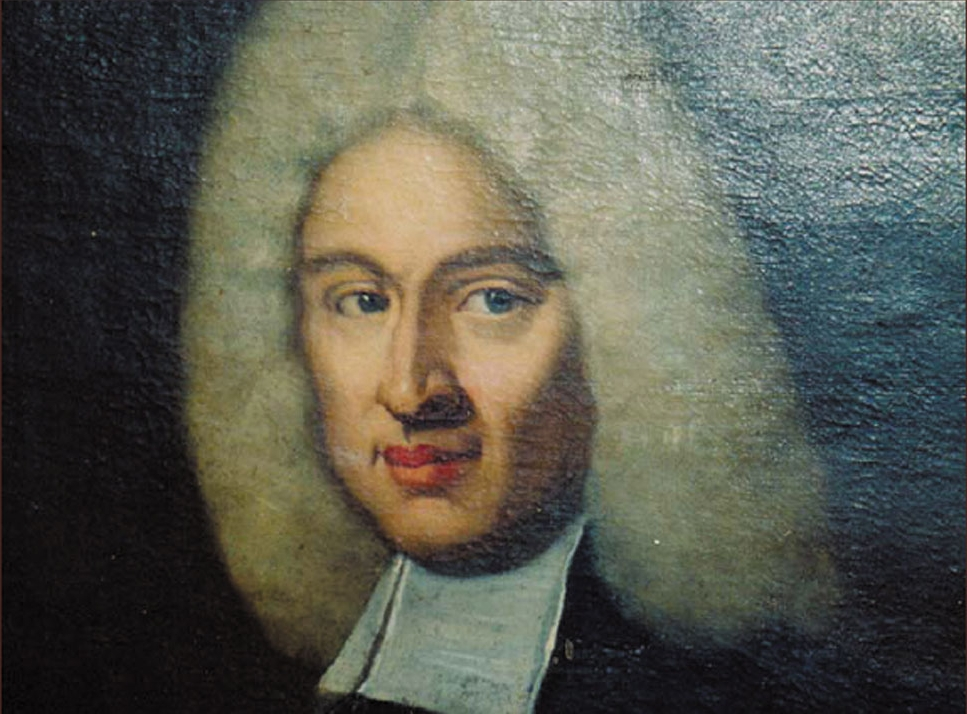
Ludovico Antonio Roncalli - Komponist

Roncalli was born in Bergamo on 6 March 1654 and baptized at the church of San Pancrazio in the Città Alta in Bergamo on 8 June 1654. He was the younger son of Conte Giovanni Martino Roncalli (1626–1700) and brother of Francesco, Conte di Montorio (1645–1717). He was ordained to the priesthood and died in Bergamo on 25 August 1713. The Roncalli family still possess a portrait of him in clerical dress (Dell'Ara and Parimbelli 2004, 17).A note on the back of the painting reads "Comes Ludovicus Roncalius I.V.D. [Iuris Utriusque Doctor) et abbas, et suis legatis ad Sancta exercitia promovenda insignis largitur. Obiit ann. 1713 Die 25 augusti. Aetatis sue ann. 59. men. sex". (Count Ludovico Roncalli, graduate in civil and canon law and priest, illustrious donor of his erudition for the promotion of spiritual exercises. Died in the year 1713, 25th day of August at the age of 59 years and 6 months). Another note in smaller letters reads "Ritratta quando era in età d’anni XXXII" (painted when he was 32 years of age). The portrait is reproduced in Dell'Ara's article and in the liner notes to the recordings of Jorge Oraison and Giacomo Parimbelli. A letter written by his brother Francesco to padre Martino is preserved in family archives. It refers to financial assistance given to Ludovico whilst he was in Rome in 1695. His reasons for visiting Rome are unknown but he may have been introduced to musical circles there by Cardinal Pamphilli to whom Capricci armonici is dedicated.

He published a collection of nine suites for five-course baroque guitar, Capricci armonici sopra la chitarra spagnola ("Harmonic caprices for the Spanish guitar"), in 1692. This is dedicated to the well-known patron of music, Cardinal Benedetto Panfili, a great-grandson of Pope Innocent X who was Cardinal Legate in Bologna from 1690 and later librarian of the Biblioteca Apostolica Vaticana in Rome (Dell'Ara and Parimbelli 2004, 17). It was transcribed into modern notation and arranged for the six-string guitar by Oscar Chilesotti in 1881. The work consists of nine complete suites, each comprising a preludio and alemanda followed by some of the other seventeenth-century dance forms such as corrente, sarabanda, gigue, minuet and gavotta. The last movement of the ninth suite is a passacaglia which was orchestrated by Ottorino Respighi and included in his Ancient Airs and Dances Suite no. 3. Roncalli's music is a great favorite of guitar enthusiasts, and individual movements frequently appear in guitar method books. Frederick Noad, who compiled an anthology titled The Baroque Guitar, as well as other popular instruction books, did not rate the Chilesotti transcription highly, pointing to many omitted embellishments and octave errors relating to the fourth and fifth strings (Noad 1974, 29). Roncalli probably used a bourdon or low octave string only on the fourth course with the fifth course re-entrant – a method of stringing particularly associated with his compatriot Francesco Corbetta and widely used in the latter part of the seventeenth century – e' bb gg dd' aa. Another edition in modern notation was published by Bruno Henze, and released in 1955 by VEB Friedrich Hofmeister, Leipzig. Noad did not comment on whether this edition had corrected the deficiencies of the Chilesotti version.

The original is available in two facsimile editions, both published in 1979.

Roncalli's Capricci armonici sopra la chitarra spagnola has been the exclusive subject of several recent recordings. One of the first was Sandro Volta's of suites I, II, IV, V, VII, and VIII on the Arion label in 1994 (ARN 68336). Jorge Oraisón recorded the entire cycle on 2 CDs for Vanguard Classics in 1996 (99151). Richard Savino recorded suites I, II, III, V, VII, and VIII for Dorian in 2008 (DSL-90604). Volta, Oraisón, and Savino used five-course guitars for their Roncalli recordings. In 2004 another recording devoted exclusively to Roncalli's work was released on the Italian label Tactus. It features Giacomo Parimbelli performing the complete suites except for V, VI, and IX, on a 19th-century instrument.
