= Adam Falckenhagen =

German lutenist and composer (1697–1754)

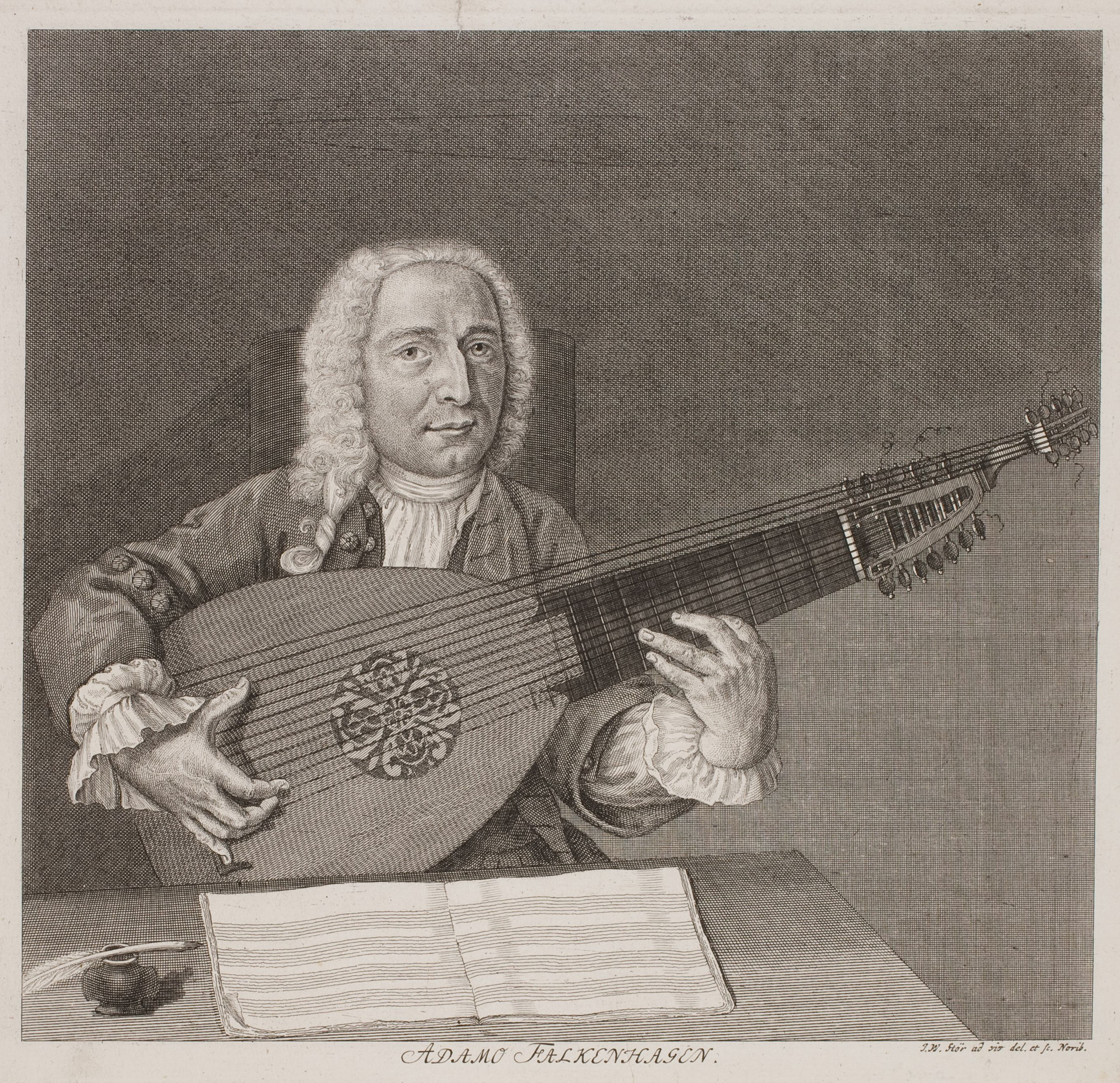
Adam Falckenhagen

Adam Falckenhagen (26 April 1697 – 6 October 1754) was a German lutenist and composer of the Baroque period.

He was born in Groß-Dölzig, near Leipzig in Saxony, but spent the later part of his life in Bayreuth. He wrote tuneful music which is still played today on lute and guitar. Much of this music survives in the Bavarian State Library, Munich.

He received his first musical instruction in the village of Knauthain, the native home of Johann Christian Weyrauch. Weyrauch was a pupil of Johann Sebastian Bach and transcriber of works by Bach for the lute. In 1713 Falckenhagen is mentioned as "gifted in literature and music," and in 1715 as "Musician and footman of the young Lord of Dieskau." The Dieskaus were a family for whom J.S. Bach later wrote the Bauernkantate in Merseburg. Falckenhagen stayed in Merseburg with the Dieskaus from about 1715, until in 1719 he succeeded Johann Graf in the position of Saxe Court lutenist. Falckenhagen attended Leipzig University from 1719 to 1720. It has been suggested that Falckenhagen also studied with Johann Graf, a pupil of Sylvius Leopold Weiss (1686-1750), and later with Weiss himself.

Like many of his contemporaries, Falckenhagen travelled from court to court most of his life (Weissenfels, 1720–1727; Jena and Weimar (1729-1732)), eventually settling in Bayreuth, where he won the favour of Wilhelmine of Prussia, Margravine of Bayreuth, in 1734. Wilhelmine was a lutenist and sister of Frederick the Great; she invited him to be the court lutenist at Bayreuth. Falckenhagen held this position until his death in 1754.

Falckenhagen's music is representative of the final flowering of 18th-century lute music in Germany.

== Works ==
- 6 Sonatas for Lute, Op. 1 (Nuremberg, circa 1740)
- 6 Partitas for Lute, Op. 2 (Nuremberg, circa 1742)
- 6 Concertos for Lute and Flute Op. 3 (Nuremberg, circa 1743)
- Preludio Nel quale Sono contenuti tutti i Tuoni Musicali (1750)
