= Jean-Baptiste Besard =

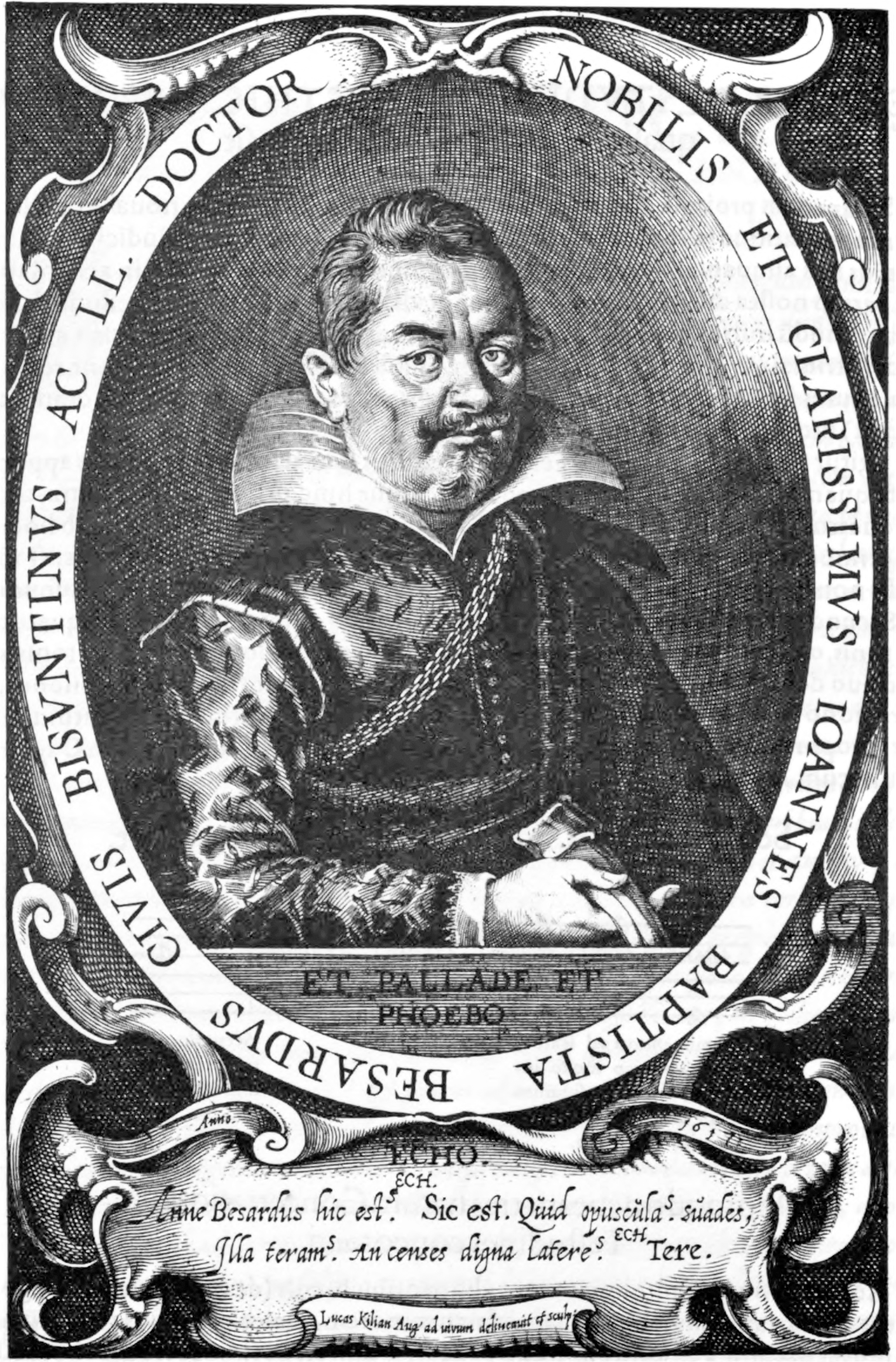
Jean-Baptiste Besard.

Jean-Baptiste Besard (c.1567 – c.1625) was a bisontin lutenist, composer and anthologist who lived and worked in the Holy Roman Empire. He is known for publishing two anthologies which collected a diverse range of musical works of the Renaissance and early Baroque periods and included instructions on playing the lute.

== Biography ==
Born in Besançon, Besard studied law (Licentiate and Doctor of Laws, 1587) at the University of Dole. He went on to Rome, where he studied medicine until c. 1595. While in Rome he also studied music with the famous lutenist Lorenzino del Liuto (Lorenzo Tracetti). In 1597 he was in Hesse where he may have taught the lute in addition to practising medicine and law. He then lived for a period in Cologne where in 1603 he published an anthology for lute, Thesaurus harmonicus, containing 403 arrangements for lute in French tablature of contemporaneous instrumental works and songs by various composers (including some by himself). The Thesaurus included an addendum on the method of playing the lute, De modo in testudine libellus, which was later translated into English by Robert Dowland. Moving to Augsburg, probably around 1610, he continued practicing medicine and law, and possibly teaching the lute.

In 1617, Besard published another collection in Augsburg: Novus Partus, sive Concertationes Musicae, containing approximately 60 solo and ensemble pieces, many of which were by Besard himself. He also wrote treatises on other subjects such as medicine, physics and history.

Besard died some time after 22 October 1617 (the date of his last book), or perhaps in 1625 in Augsburg (Bavaria).

== Legacy ==
Apart from repertoire for the lute, music from Besard's anthologies have been a rich source of transcriptions and adaptations in later periods. Ottorino Respighi used some pieces in his Ancient Airs and Dances and a small number form part of the classical guitar repertoire.
