= Esaias Reusner =

German lutenist and composer

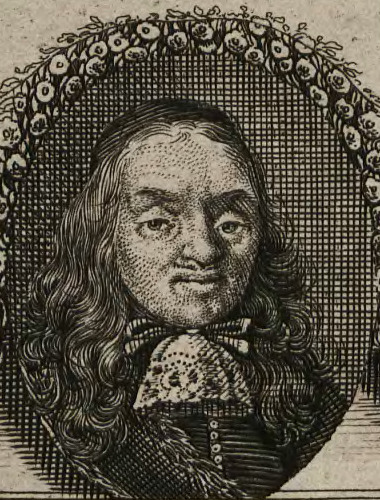
portrait of Esaias Reusner

Esaias Reusner (the Younger) (29 April 1636 – 1 May 1679) was a German lutenist and composer.

Reusner was born in Löwenberg in Silesia, then part of Bohemia. His first lute teacher was his father Esaias (lutenist to the Prince of Bernstadt, Henry Wenceslaus). He was a child prodigy and together with his father he traveled and performed at various courts. He wrote two collections of lute suites - Deliciae testudinis and Neue Lauten-früchte. In the years from 1655 to 1672, he was in the service of the duke of Silesia. Thereafter, he worked for a short time as a flute and lute teacher at the University of Leipzig. Finally in 1674, he was appointed chamber lutenist at the court of Frederick William, Elector of Brandenburg in Berlin, Germany, where he remained until his death, aged 43.

- Hundert geistliche Melodien evangelischer Lieder (One hundred spiritual melodies from evangelical songs) (for lute, 1676 or 1678)
- various lute and orchestral suites
