= Pierre Gaultier =

French lutenist and composer

Pierre Gaultier (Gaultier of Orléans; Gaultier Orléanois; Gaultier de Rome, 1599 – after 1638) was a French lutenist and composer.

== Life ==
Gaultier hailed from Orléans where he was christened probably on 30 August 1599 in the church of Saint-Michel. Active in Italy in the early 1630s, he probably made the acquaintance of his future patron, prince Johann Anton I of Eggenberg (1610–1649), then ambassador of the emperor Ferdinand III to Pope Urban VIII in Rome in 1638. Nothing is known about his further vita.

Gaultier is not identical to the Jesuit and scholar Pierre Gautruche (Latinised form: Petrus Galtruchius Aurelianensis, baptized on 4 August 1602 in the church of Saint-Paul, Orléans, died 1681 in Caen) who he was formerly taken to be. He is also not the composer and opera director Gaultier de Marseilles (1642–1696), whose name was also Pierre Gaultier.

== Works ==
Music by Gaultier has survived in a single publication: Les Oeuvres de Pierre Gaultier (Rome, 1638), dedicated to his patron, the prince of Eggenberg. Gaultier probably paid and sold the book, containing 105 pieces of music with six different new tunings (so called accords nouveaux), on his own. It is the only publication of French lute music of that period that was published outside France.

Gaultier's music is typical in that it features the contemporary style of broken melody (in modern sources often called style brisé, a term coined during the 20th century) and in that he experimented with new tunings. Atypical of French lute music of that period, however, was his extensive use of hammer-ons and pull-offs, and of campanella technique, both of which betray the strong influence of Italian guitarists and theorbists.

== Edition ==
Monique Rollin (ed.): Oeuves de Pierre Gaultier (Paris: CNRS, Corpus des Luthistes Français, 1984).

== Recording ==
Sigrun Richter, Les Accords Nouveaux: Pierre Gaultier – Les Oeuvres, Rom 1636, ASIN: B000024PKV.

== Bibliography ==
- François-Pierre Goy: "Three Versions of Pierre Gaultier's Battaille (1626, 1638, 1650)", in: Journal of the Lute Society of America, vol. XLII-XLIII (2009-2010), p. 1-89, ISSN 0076-1524.
