= Robert Ballard II =

French lutenist and composer

An Entrée de luth by Robert Ballard, performed on an eight-course Renaissance lute by David Hernández Romero

Robert Ballard II (c. 1572 or 1575 – after 1650) was a prominent French lutenist and composer. Probably born in Paris, his father, Robert Ballard Senior (c.1527–1588) was the head of the well-known music publishers "Le Roy & Ballard", founded in 1551 with cousin Adrian Le Roy (a notable virtuoso lutenist and composer of the period).

From 1612 he entered the service of the French Regent Maria de Medici and was tutor to the young King Louis XIII, becoming a lutenist and composer ("Musicien ordinaire du roi") at the royal court in 1618.

== Publications ==
The family music publishing business eventually passed to Robert´s brother Pierre, who published two books of lute music by Robert: Premier Livre de tablature de luth (1611) and Diverses Pièces mises sur le luth (1614).
