= Denis Gaultier =

French lutenist and composer

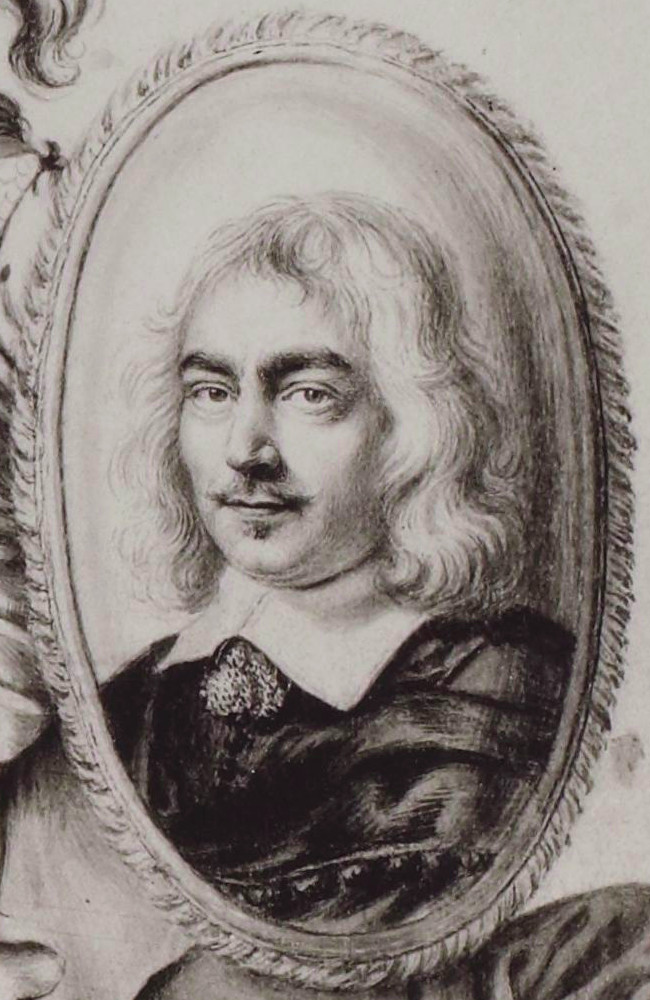
Denis Gaultier, engraving by Robert Nanteuil from La Rhétorique des Dieux (1652, detail)

Denis Gaultier (Gautier, Gaulthier; also known as Gaultier le jeune and Gaultier de Paris) (1597 or 1602/3 – 1672) was a French lutenist and composer. He was a cousin of Ennemond Gaultier.

== Life ==
Gaultier was born in Paris; two conflicting sources point to either 1597 or 1603 as the year of birth. The former can be deduced from an account by Thorian, who claimed that Gaultier died in 1672 at the age of seventy-five. However, an archival document from the Hôtel-Dieu de Paris hospital states that Gaultier was twenty-three at the time of his convalescence in the hospital, which was from 24 October 1626 to 12 December 1626.

Very little is known about Gaultier's career. He may have studied under Charles Racquet, since he commemorated the lutenist's death with a tombeau. Until at least 1631 Denis's career was closely linked to that of his older cousin, Ennemond; so much that contemporary writers referred to either composer by surname only, making no attempt to distinguish between them. Both lutenists had connections with Blancrocher and Henri de L'Enclos, and both secured a high reputation comparable to that of François Dufaut, Jacques Gallot, or Charles Mouton. In 1635 Denis married Françoise Daucourt. Their son Philippe Emmanuel would later become advisor to the king, but there is no evidence that Gaultier himself ever held a court position, even though his cousin did. Denis most probably gained fame and income through salon playing.

== Works ==
Denis and Ennemond are confused in many contemporary manuscripts and prints, leading to numerous attribution problems. A number of pieces are signed simply with the surname, some are attributed to Denis in one collection and to Ennemond in another, and still others are now known to have been be misattributed. Gaultier's output, as is to be expected from a 17th-century French lutenist, consists mainly of dance suites for the lute. In general, Gaultier was a masterful melodist, effortlessly writing graceful melodic lines with clear phrase structures, but his music is less inventive harmonically than that of some other French lutenists of the era, such as René Mesangeau or Pierre Dubut.

Three published collections of Gaultier's music have come down to us, all from his late years. La Rhétorique des dieux (1652) contains twelve parts, each named after one of the Greek modes, but the actual harmonic procedures of the pieces are not connected to the modes. Many of the pieces reference Greek mythology. The collection, compiled under the patronage of Anne de Chambré, also contains engravings after Le Sueur, Abraham Bosse and Robert de Nanteuil. Two other collections, Pièces de luth sur trois différens modes nouveaux (c.1669) and Livre de tablature [...] de Mr. Gaultier Sr. de Nève et de Mr. Gaultier son cousin (c.1672) both begin with basic instructions on lute playing. All three manuscripts consist principally of dances. The one other genre Gaultier made an important contribution to is the tombeau.

An adequate assessment of Gaultier's music and influence is difficult, owing to attribution problems. According to recent research, La Rhétorique des dieux may consist of works not composed by Denis Gaultier, or original works by him changed by unknown scribes. The 1672 collection was completed after Gaultier's death by his pupil Montarcis, and contains music by two different Gaultiers. Other pieces, found in various manuscripts, also pose numerous attribution problems. Nevertheless, Gaultier was an important exponent of the French style brisé, and as such an influence on harpsichordists such as Johann Jakob Froberger. Around 1680 a few of Gaultier's works were included in anthologies by Perrine, a French theorist who experimented with the writing of lute music in staff notation.

== Media ==
- La Rhétorique des Dieux: Appolon orateur

== Bibliography ==
- David Joseph Buch (ed.): Denis Gaultier: La Rhétorique des dieux (Middleton, Wisconsin: A-R Editions, 1990); ISBN 978-0-89579-238-9
- Rollin, Monique (2001). "Denis Gaultier". In Sadie, Stanley; Tyrrell, John (eds.). The New Grove Dictionary of Music and Musicians (2nd ed.). London: Macmillan Publishers. ISBN 978-1-56159-239-5.
