= Hans Judenkünig =

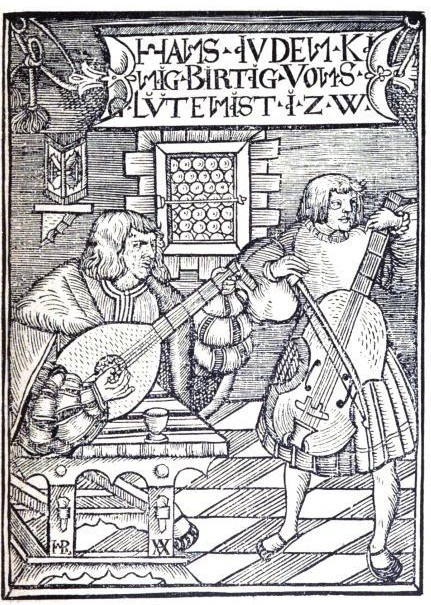
Judenkunig 1523 gbs.jpg

Hans Judenkünig (also Judenkunig or Judenkönig; c. 1445 – 4 March 1526) was a German lutenist, lute maker, and composer of the Renaissance.

== Life and career ==
Hans Judenkünig was born in Schwäbisch Gmünd sometime between the years 1445 and 1450. His family originated from Württemberg where its possible his father was Hartmann Judenkünig of that city. The earliest known record of Hans Judenkünig dates to 1518 where he is recorded as a lutenist at St. Stephen's Cathedral, Vienna. He worked as a lutenist in the vicinity of the University of Vienna and was best known for his two lute books written for the self-teaching of a lay audience. His instructional manual for the lute, Utilis et compendiaria introductio, qua ut fundamento iacto quam facillime musicum exercitium, instrumentorum et lutine, et quod vulgo Geygen nominant, addiscitur, was published in Vienna at latest in 1519 but possibly as early as 1515.

He died in Vienna in March 1526.

== Works ==
- Utilis et compendiaria introductio, qua ut fundamento iacto quam facillime musicum exercitium, instrumentorum et lutine, et quod vulgo Geygen nominant, addiscitur Vienna ca. 1515/1519
- Ain schone kunstliche Underweisung in disem Büechlein, leychtlich zu begreyffen den rechten Grund zu lernen auff der Lautten und Geygen Vienna 1523

== Recording ==
- 1994 - The Renaissance Lute - Ronn McFarlane - Dorian DOR-90186 contains five tracks by Judenkönig:

- Madonna katerina
- Christ ist erstanden (Christ is risen)
- Und wer er nit erstanden (And who is not risen)
- Der hoff dantz
- Der hoff dantz (Nach tantz)
