= René Mesangeau =

French composer and lutenist

René Mésangeau (or Mézangeau, Mesangio, Mésengeot, Mesengé, Meziniot, Meschanson, Mesangior, Mazagau, Merengeau, Messangior, Mezanio, and Mezengau) (fl. 1567–1638) was a French composer and lutenist. He is considered to be one of the finest lutenists of the 17th century.

In 1619, he settled in France and married the daughter of the spinet maker Jean Jacquet. In 1621, he was appointed Musicien ordinaire du Roi at the French court by Louis XIII. It is known that during his life he visited Germany and England. He died around January 1638 in Paris.

His output consists of about fifty works, including his own works and transcriptions, which were influential in the development of lute music after 1630. He was a pioneer of the new D minor lute tuning that was important for the style brisé. His achievements brought him recognition by Pierre Ballard (1631 and 1638) and by Marin Mersenne in his Harmonie Universelle (1636).

His pupil Ennemond Gaultier composed the first known tombeau (Le Tombeau de Mézangeau, 1638) for him.

== Sources ==
- Annala H.; Matlik H. (2007). Handbook of Guitar and Lute Composers. Mel Bay Publications. p. 36. ISBN 978-0-7866-5844-2.
- The New Grove Dictionary of Music and Musicians
