= Jacques Gallot =

17th-century French lutenist and composer

Jacques Gallot (or Jacques de Gallot, le vieux Gallot de Paris) (c. 1625 – c. 1695 in Paris, France) was a French lutenist and composer.

He came from a Parisian family of lutenists and composers. He was a student of Ennemond Gaultier. In Paris, he published Pièces de luth composées sur différens mode introduced by a brief treatment of the lute. The pieces in this work are organized by tone and include also minuets. Some pieces signed vieux Gallot can be also found in the manuscript Becker II.6.14 in Musikbibliothek Leipzig. His compositions include musical portraits, such as La Fontange, La Montespan and also tombeaux (Turenne, Condé, Madame). He was one of the developers of this musical form.

His brother Alexander Gallot (ca. 1625 – 1684) was also a composer and lutenist.

A tombeau in his memory was composed by Robert de Visée.

One of Gallot's works was transcribed for orchestra by Ottorino Respighi as part of his suite Gli Uccelli.

== Sources ==
- Biography (in French)
