= Charles Mouton =

French lutenist and composer

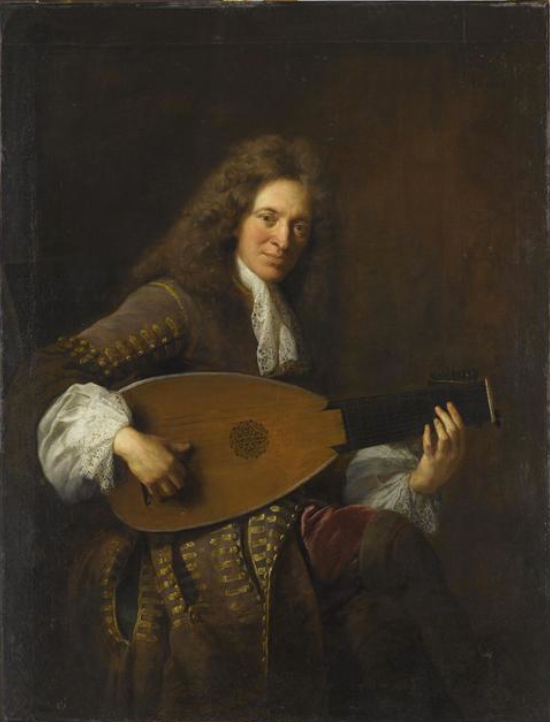
Charles Mouton by François de Troy, Paris, 1690

Charles Mouton (1617 - before 1699) was a French lutenist and composer.

There were musicians in Mouton's mother's family, one of whom worked at the French court. Mouton was living in Paris in 1664, where he had several affluent students. He took part in a concert at the court of Savoy in Turin in 1673. In 1680 he was back in Paris; his students at this time included René Milleran and Philipp Franz Le Sage de Richée. It was in this period (before 1679 and c. 1680) that Mouton published two books of his compositions, Pièces de luth sur différents modes. The first book includes notes on the performance of the pieces. Several years later he sat for portraitist François de Troy; he died some time in the next eight years.

Mouton and his contemporary Jacques Gallot are two of the last noteworthy French composers for the lute.

== Discography ==
Vinyl:

- Works of E. & D. Gaultier, Charles Mouton & J.S. Bach. Performed by Catherine Liddell. Titanic Records Ti-29 (1979)
- Charles Mouton: Pièces de luth. Performed by Hopkinson Smith. Astrée AS 52 (1980)
- Charles Mouton: Pièces de luth. Performed by Walter Gerwig. Archive Production, AP 13027a (1955), Heliodor H25018 (1966)

Compact Discs:

- Pièces de luth: French lute music, 17th century. Performed by Konrad Junghanel. Deutsche Harmonia Mundi 05472 77849 2 (2002)
- Charles Mouton: Pièces de luth. Performed by Hopkinson Smith. Astrée E7728 (2002)
- Une Douceur Violente. Performed by Anthony Bailes. Ramée RAM 1104 (2011)
- Charles Mouton. Performed by Anders Ericson. Daphne 1049 (2014)
- Charles Mouton. Pièces pour le luth. Performed by Carlos Cantero. HR Recordings E381HR (2026)
