= François Dufault =

French lutenist and composer

François Dufault (or Dufaut) (before 1604 (?) – ca. 1672?) was a French lutenist and composer.

Dufault was born in Bourges, France. As a student of Denis Gaultier, he enjoyed an excellent reputation as an instrumentalist, which is demonstrated in many contemporary sources where he was described as one of the greatest lutenists of his time. Almost no information is preserved about his life. He died, probably during the end of the 1660s or early 1670s, in England.

From his works has survived a collection of twelve lute compositions in tablature besides a few individual works in manuscript or other compilations. His works are written with a lot of harmonic freedom and nearly in an improvisatory style.

== Life ==
- François Dufaut composed music for the lute. His rhythmic sensitivity is remarkable. He left:
- twelve pieces of tablature in the collection entitled Tablature de luth de différents autheurs sur des accords nouveaux, published by P. Ballard in 1631,
- a certain number of other pieces which remained in manuscript, scattered in the libraries of Vienna, Berlin, Paris, Rostock or Besançon, borrowing the form of dances with subtitles, which made the fortune of French harpsichordists,
- but also "tombeaux" in the Baroque music, dedicated to the memory of a fellow musician, poet, or friend.

He seems to have traveled a lot, especially in England.

He trained as a lutenist with Denis Gaultier, of whom he was a pupil around 1630, and whose manner is reflected many times in his own artistic expression.

Like most of the great composers of his time, Dufaut showed a certain inclination for harmony, without departing from the discretion and refinement that characterized his art.

== Works ==
Here are some of Dufaut's lute works, out of about 165 pieces:

- Suite en sol mineur :
  - Prélude
  - Allemande
  - Sarabande & Double
  - Courante suedoise
  - Gigue
  - Tombeau de Monsieur Blancrocher
- Suite en ut mineur :
  - Prélude
  - Allemande
  - Courent
  - Sarabande
  - Guigue
- Suite en la mineur :
  - Prélude
  - Allemande
  - Gigue
  - Courante
  - Courante
  - Sarabande
- Suite en ut majeur :
  - Allemande
  - Sarabande
  - Gavotte
  - Sauterelle
- Pavane en mi mineur

== Sources ==
- Article "François Dufaut" in Silvo Riolfo Marengo, Encyclopédie de la musique, Paris, LGF, coll. La Pochothèque, 2000
- Article "François Dufaut" in Marc Vignal, Dictionnaire de la musique, volume 1, Paris, Larousse, 1999
- Notice du disque François Dufaut, Jacques Gallot Pièces pour luth (interprète Pascal Montheilhet) written by François-Pierre Goy.

== Discography ==
- En 1976, Hopkinson Smith a enregistré un disque entier sous le label Astrée/Auvidis, (réf. As 15), réédité en CD en 1989 (réf. E 7735)
- Dufaut: 5 suites for lute by Louis Pernot at Accord (Musidisc) (Ref: 200262 MU 750) recorded in 1988
- François Dufaut, Jacques Gallot Pièces pour luth Pascal Montheilhet, disque Virgin
- In 2006, André Henrich dedicated an entire record to the composer, disque Aeolus.
- Les Accords Nouveaux II, record by Sigrun Richter devoted to suites by René Mézangeau, Nicolas Bouvier, Mr Dubuisson (Étienne Houselot), Nicolas Chevalier and François Dufaut.
