= Ennemond Gaultier =

French lutenist and composer

Ennemond Gaultier (Gaultier le Vieux, Gaultier de Lyon; also spelled Gautier or Gauthier) (Villette c. 1575 – Les Nèves 11 December 1651) was a French lutenist and composer. He was one of the masters of the 17th century French lute school.

Gaultier was born in Villette, Dauphiné, France. He worked first in Lyon and in 1620, he became valet of the Queen Mother Marie de' Medici and court lutenist in Paris. It is possible that he was a pupil of René Mezangeau. In 1631, he retired to Les Nèves and spent the rest of his life there.

== Works ==
His cousin Denis Gaultier published a printed lute book in 1669, which contained compositions by Ennemond as well. However, assignment of the authorship to one of them is difficult. This is similar also for other collections where works appear under name Gaultier. However, these works had a great influence on the development of lute music of the following years.

Among his most famous works are Le Tombeau de Mezangeau (Allemande), La Belle Homicide (Courante) or Les Canaries du Vieux Gaultier, which became cornerstones of the repertoire of the French Baroque lute. His piece Le Tombeau de Mezangeau (1638) may be the earliest example of the tombeau.
