= List of 17th-century chaconnes =

This is a list of chaconnes composed in the 17th century. Included are all pieces of 17th-century music, or clearly marked off sections of pieces, labeled "chaconne" (or some variant of that word) by their composers, that have been found by contributors to this article among the works of musicians, musicologists, and music historians. A few pieces not labeled "chaconne" by their composers, when they have been clearly identified as chaconnes by later commentators, have also been included. A definitive list would be impossible to make, because there was in the 17th century, and there remains today, disagreement about the defining characteristics of a chaconne. That subject is treated in the article Chaconne.

Jump to decade:

- 1600–09
- 1610–19
- 1620–29
- 1630–39
- 1640–49
- 1650–59
- 1660–69
- 1670–79
- 1680–89
- 1690–99
- 16??
- Bibliography

List of 17th-century Chaconnes
Composer	Piece and original source	Standard catalogue reference or accessible sheet music	Recent audio recording
1600–09
Montesardo, Girolamo [Melcarne da] (dates unknown)	(1606) Chaconne bass line in 3 keys (G major, C major, F major) for guitar, from Nuova inventione d'intavolatura (Florence, 1606)	Hudson 1982, pp. xxxiv & 1	
1610–19
Vallet, Nicolas (c. 1583–c. 1642)	(1615) Chaconna in B^{♭} major for lute, from Le secret des muses, premier livre (Amsterdam, 1615)	Vallet 1970	Paul O'Dette, Nicolas Vallet: Le Secret Des Muses (CD, Harmonia Mundi, 2004)
Falconieri, Andrea (1585/86–1656)	(1616) "O vezzosetta dalla chioma d'oro," aria sopra la ciaccona in F major for 2 voices and continuo, from Libro primo di villanelle (Rome, 1616)	Hudson 1982, pp. xxxvi & 12	Yoshimichi Hamada, Anthonello, Ciaccona: La gioia della musica nell'Italia dell '600 (CD, Symphonia, 2002)
anonymous	(1619) 2 chaconne bass lines (in G major, F major) for guitar, from a manuscript in the Biblioteca Musicale Governativa del Conservatorio, Rome (1619)	Hudson 1982, pp. xxxiv, xxxvi, 3 & 10	
1620–29
Sanseverino, Benedetto (dates unknown)	(1620) 5 chaconne bass lines (in F major, F major, F major, d minor, g minor) for guitar, from Intavolatura facile (Milan, 1620)	Hudson 1982, pp. xxxiv–xxxv, 1–4 & 8	
Colonna, Giovanni Ambrosio (dates unknown)	(1620) 5 chaconne bass lines (in G, G, C, F, A, all major) for guitar, from Intavolatura di chitarra alla spagnuola (Milan, 1620)	Hudson 1982, pp. xxxiv & 2–4	
Briceño, Luis de (dates unknown)	(1626) 1 chaconne bass line in F major and 1 chaconne chord accompaniment in b minor for guitar, from Método mui facilissimo (Paris, 1626)	Hudson 1982, pp. xxxv, 8 & 10	
Millioni, Pietro (dates unknown)	(1627) Chaconne bass line in D major for guitar, from Quarta impressione del quarto libro d'intavolatura di chitarra spagnola (Rome, 1627)	Hudson 1982, pp. xxxiv & 4	
Millioni, Pietro (dates unknown)	(1627) Chaconne bass line in F major for guitar, from Seconda impressione del quarto libro d'intavolatura di chitarra spagnola (Rome, 1627)	Hudson 1982, pp. xxxv & 9	
Costanzo, Fabritio (dates unknown)	(1627) Chaconne bass line in G major for guitar, from Fior novello, Libro primo (Bologna, 1627)	Hudson 1982, pp. xxxv & 8	
anonymous	(1620–29) 8 chaconne bass lines for guitar, from Italian manuscripts	Hudson 1982, pp. xxxiv & 1–4	
anonymous	(c. 1620) 2 French chaconnes (in F major, B^{♭} major) for lute, both from a manuscript from Saumur, France, in the British Library, London	Hudson 1982, pp. xxxviii & 94–95	
Stefani, Giovanni (dates unknown)	(1621) "Amante felice," sopra l'aria della ciaccona, in F major, from Affetti amorosi canzonette ad una voce sola (Venice, 1621)	Chilesotti 1884–1914, 3, p. 44	Raquel Andueza, Pierre Pitzl, Private Musicke, Alfabeto Songs: Guitar Songs from the 17th century (CD, Accent, 2013)
Piccinini, Alessandro (1566–c. 1638)	(1623) Chiaccona in partite variate in G major for chitarrone, from Intavolatura di liuto e di chitarrone, libro primo (Bologna, 1623)	Piccinini 1983a, p. 121	Rafael Bonavita, Música Moderna (CD, Enchinadis, 2007)
Arañés, Juan ("Joan Araniés" in Catalan, d. 1649)	(1624) Chacona for 4 voices, "A la vida bona," from Libro segundo de tonos y villancicos (Rome, 1624)		Nueva Sarao, El Sarao De La Chacona: Juan Arañés, "Libro Segondo de Tonos y Villancicos" (CD, Musiepoca, 2013)
Frescobaldi, Girolamo (1583–1643)	(1627) Partite sopra ciaccona in C major for harpsichord, from Secondo libro di toccata (Rome, 1627)	Silberger 2010–2014, F 3.39	Richard Lester, Frescobaldi: Harpsichord Works, v. 2 (CD, Nimbus, 2010)
Manelli, Francesco (1594–1667)	(1629) "Acceso mio core," ciaccona in C major for 3 voices and continuo, from Ciaccone et arie (Rome, 1629)	Hudson 1982, pp. xxxvi & 16–18	Richard Savino, El Mundo, The Kingdoms of Castille: Spanish, Italian . . . Music of the 17th & 18th Centuries (CD, Sono Luminus, 2011)
1630–39
anonymous	(1630–35 c.) 34 chaconne bass line or chord accompaniments for guitar	Hudson 1982, pp. xxxiv–xxxvi & 1–11	
Frescobaldi, Girolamo (1583–1643)	(1630) "Deh, vien da me pastorella," ceccona in C major for 2 tenors, from Arie musicali per cantarsi, libro secondo (Rome, 1630)	Silberger 2010–2014, F 7.41	Rinaldo Alessandrini, Concerto Italiano, Girolamo Frescobaldi: Arie musicali, secondo libro (CD, Opus 111, 2000)
Monteverdi, Claudio (1567–1643)	(1632) "Zefiro torna, e di soavi accenti," ciaccona for 2 tenors, from Scherzi musicali cioè arie e madrigali (Venice, 1632)	Stattkus 1985, SV 251	L'Arpeggiata, Monteverdi: Teatro d'amore (CD, Warner, 2009)
Sances or Sanci, Giovanni Felice (1600–1679)	(1633) "Accenti queruli spiegate all'aure," Cantata a voce sola sopra la ciaccona, from Cantade a voce sola, libro secondo (Venice, 1633)	Sances 1633, part 1, pp. 15-19	Ensemble for the Seicento, Forbidden Dance: Dances and Diminutions of the Italian Baroque (CD, MSR Classics, 2001)
Sances or Sanci, Giovanni Felice (1600–1679)	(1633) "Lagrimosa beltà," cantada a doi voci in ciacona, from Cantade a voce sola, libro secondo (Venice, 1633)	Sances 1633, part 2, pp. 1-12	Agnès Mellon, Dominique Visse, Ensemble Barcarole, Madrigali a due voci (CD, Zig Zag Territoires, 2010)
Merula, Tarquinio (1594/95–1665)	(1633) "Su la cetra amorosa," aria in ciaccona for soprano, from Madrigali et altre musiche concertate (Venice, 1633)		Montserrat Figueras, Jordi Savall, et al., Tarquinio Merula: Arie e capricci a voce sola (CD, Astrée, 2000)
Merula, Tarquinio (1594/95–1665)	(1635) "Chi prend'amor a gioco," sopra la chiccona in C major for 3 voices, 2 violins, continuo, from Musiche concertate, libro 2 (Venice, 1635)	Hudson 1982, pp. xxxvi & 20–31	Ensemble Suonare e Cantare, Merula: Madrigali e altre musiche concertate (CD, Arion, 2001)
anonymous	(c. 1635) Ciaccona per B (in C major) for guitar, from a manuscript in the Biblioteca Comunale Augusta, Perugia	Hudson 1982, pp. xxxvi & 19	
anonymous	(c. 1635) Ciaccona per E (in d minor) for guitar, from a manuscript in the Biblioteca Comunale Augusta, Perugia	Hudson 1982, pp. xxxvi & 19	
Gregori, Annibale (?–1633)	(1635) "Mai non disciolgasi dal mi cor misero," ciacona a 2 soprani in C major, from Ariosi concerti (Venice, 1635)	Tomlinson 1986, 2, pp.168–189	Le Nuove Musiche, Giovanni Felice Sances: Arie & Duetti (CD, Stradivarius, 2000)
Frescobaldi, Girolamo (1583–1643)	(1637) Ciaccona in G major for harpsichord, from Toccate d’intavolatura di cimbalo et organo, partite di diverse arie . . . (Rome, 1637)	Silberger 2010–2014, F 2.32.02	
Frescobaldi, Girolamo (1583–1643)	(1637) Ciaccona in A major for harpsichord, from Toccate d’intavolatura di cimbalo et organo, partite di diverse arie . . . (Rome, 1637)	Silberger 2010–2014, F 2.33.02	
Merula, Tarquinio (1594/95–1665)	(1637) Sonata 20: Ciaccona, for 2 violins & basso obligato, from Canzoni overo sonate concertate (Venice, 1637)	Merula 1969, pp. 22–23 (first violin part)	L'Arpeggiata, Via Crucis (CD, Warner, 2010)
Ferrari, Benedetto (1603/4–1681)	(1637) "Voglio di vita uscir," ciaccona in ? for soprano, from Musiche varie a voce sola, libro secondo (Venice, 1637)	Ferrari 1985, 2, pp. 24–29	Mona Spägele, Ensemble Incantato, Benedetto Ferrari: Madrigali e Canzonette (CD, CPO, 2000)
Piccinini, Alessandro (1566–c. 1638)	(1639) Chiaccona "Mariona alla vera spagnola" in F major for lute, from Intavolatura di liuto, libro secondo (Bologna, 1639)	Piccinini 1983b, pp. 49–52	Francesca Torelli, Alessandro Piccinini: Intavolatura di liuto e di chitarrone, libro secondo (CD, Tactus, 2012)
Piccinini, Alessandro (1566–c. 1638)	(1639) Chiaccona "Cappona alla vera spagnola" in E^{♭} major for lute, from Intavolatura di liuto, libro secondo (Bologna, 1639)	Piccinini 1983b, pp. 55–59	Axel Wolf, Chiaccona: Musik für Laute und Chitarrone (CD, Raumklang, 2004)
Corbetta, Francesco (c. 1615–1681)	(1639) 5 chaconne bass line or chord accompaniments for guitar, from De gli scherzi armonici (Bologna, 1639)	Hudson 1982, pp. xxxv–xxxvi & 7–10	
Corbetta, Francesco (c. 1615–1681)	(1639) Chiaccona in C major for guitar, from De gli scherzi armonici (Bologna, 1639)	Hudson 1982, pp. xxxvi & 32	María Luz Álvarez & Lex Eisenhardt, Canta Venetia! (CD, EtCetera, 2007)
1640–49
Kapsberger, Giovanni Girolamo (1580–1651)	(1640) 5 ciaconne for chitarone, from Libro Quarto d'Intavolatura di Chitarone (Rome, 1640)	Kapsberger 2002, nos. 31–35	Rolf Lislevand, Johannes Hieronymus Kapsberger: Libro Quarto d'Intavolatura di Chitarone (CD, Astrée, 1993) (only 1 of the 5)
Carbonchi, Antonio (dates unknown)	(1640) Ciaccone passeggiate per A (in G major) for guitar, from Sonate di chitarra spagnola (Florence, 1640)	Hudson 1982, pp. xxxvii & 38–39	Marco Beasley, Pierre Pitzl, Private Musicke, Meraviglia d'amore (CD, ORF Alte Musik, 2002) (this ciaccona or the next one)
Carbonchi, Antonio (dates unknown)	(1640) Ciaccone passeggiate per G (in F major) for guitar, from Sonate di chitarra spagnola (Florence, 1640)	Hudson 1982, pp. xxxvii & 39–40	see preceding entry
Bartolotti, Angelo Michele (dates unknown)	(1640) Ciaccona in C major for guitar, from Libro primo di chitarra spagnola (Florence, 1640)	Hudson 1982, pp. xxxvii & 40–41	Yoshimichi Hamada, Anthonello, Ciaccona: La gioia della musica nell'Italia dell '600 (CD, Symphonia, 2002)
anonymous	(c. 1640) Ciacone in F major for keyboard, from a manuscript in the Biblioteca Apostolica Vaticana, Rome	Hudson 1982, pp. xxxvii & 42	
anonymous	(c. 1640) Ciacone in C major for keyboard, from a manuscript in the Biblioteca Apostolica Vaticana, Rome	Hudson 1982, pp. xxxvii & 43–44	
anonymous	(c. 1640) Ciaccona in C major for keyboard, from a manuscript in the Biblioteca Apostolica Vaticana, Rome	Hudson 1982, pp. xxxvii & 44–46	
anonymous	(c. 1640) Ciaccone in C major for keyboard, from a manuscript in the Biblioteca Apostolica Vaticana, Rome	Hudson 1982, pp. xxxvii & 46–48	
Foscarini, Giovanni Paolo (dates unknown)	(1640) Ciaconne sopra l'B (in C major), from Li cinque libri della chitarra alla spagnola (Rome, 1640)	Foscarini 1979, p. 8	
Foscarini, Giovanni Paolo (dates unknown)	(1640) Capriccio sopra la ciaccona sopra la lettera A (in G major), from Li cinque libri della chitarra alla spagnola (Rome, 1640)	Foscarini 1979, p. 17	
Foscarini, Giovanni Paolo (dates unknown)	(1640) Capriccio sopra la Ciaccona, in D major, from Li cinque libri della chitarra alla spagnola (Rome, 1640)	Foscarini 1979, p. 28	
Foscarini, Giovanni Paolo (dates unknown)	(1640) Capriccio della Ciaccona sopra la lettera G (in F major), from Li cinque libri della chitarra alla spagnola (Rome, 1640)	Foscarini 1979, p. 59	
Foscarini, Giovanni Paolo (dates unknown)	(1640) Capriccio sopra la Ciaccona, in C major?, from Li cinque libri della chitarra alla spagnola (Rome, 1640)	Foscarini 1979, p. 63	
Foscarini, Giovanni Paolo (dates unknown)	(1640) Capriccio sopra la Ciaccona sopra la lettera B (in a minor), from Li cinque libri della chitarra alla spagnola (Rome, 1640)	Foscarini 1979, p. 66	
Foscarini, Giovanni Paolo (dates unknown)	(1640) Ciaccona, in D major?, from Li cinque libri della chitarra alla spagnola (Rome, 1640)	Foscarini 1979, p. 69	
Foscarini, Giovanni Paolo (dates unknown)	(1640) Ciacone variate sopra l'B (in C major), from Li cinque libri della chitarra alla spagnola (Rome, 1640)	Foscarini 1979, pp. 91–92	
Foscarini, Giovanni Paolo (dates unknown)	(1640) Ciacone variate sopra l'C (in D major), from Li cinque libri della chitarra alla spagnola (Rome, 1640)	Foscarini 1979, pp. 93–94	
Foscarini, Giovanni Paolo (dates unknown)	(1640) Ciacone variate sopra l'G (in F major), from Li cinque libri della chitarra alla spagnola (Rome, 1640)	Foscarini 1979, pp. 95–96	
Foscarini, Giovanni Paolo (dates unknown)	(1640) Ciacone variate sopra l'H (in B^{♭} major), from Li cinque libri della chitarra alla spagnola (Rome, 1640)	Foscarini 1979, pp. 97–98	
Foscarini, Giovanni Paolo (dates unknown)	(1640) Ciacona capona con variatione del B (in C major), from Li cinque libri della chitarra alla spagnola (Rome, 1640)	Foscarini 1979, p. 107	
Foscarini, Giovanni Paolo (dates unknown)	(1640) Ciacona sopra l'C (in D major), from Li cinque libri della chitarra alla spagnola (Rome, 1640)	Foscarini 1979, p. 113	Raquel Andueza, Pierre Pitzl, Private Musicke, Alfabeto Songs: Guitar Songs from the 17th century (CD, Accent, 2013)
Ferrari, Benedetto (1603/4–1681)	(1641) "Amanti, io vi sò dire," ciaccona in G major for soprano, from Musiche varie a voce sola, libro terzo (Venice, 1641)	Ferrari 1985, 3, p. 22	Philippe Jaroussky, Ensemble Artaserse, Benedetto Ferrari: Musiche varie a voce sola (CD, Ambroisie France, 2003)
Uccellini, Marco (1603/10–1680)	(1642) Aria quarta, sopra la Ciacona, in A minor for two violins and continuo, from Sonate, arie, et correnti (Venice, 1642)	Uccellini 1642, pp. 39–40	
Giramo, Pietro Antonio (dates unknown)	(c. 1645) Varie partite sopra la Ciaccona in C major for three voices and continuo, "Questo crudo d'amor," from Arie a più voci (s.l., s.d., c. 1645)	Hudson 1982, pp. xxxvii & 59–61	
Granata, Giovanni Battista (1620/21–1687)	(1646) Chiaccone sopra C in D major for guitar, from Capricci armonici sopra la chittarriglia spagnuola (Bologna, 1646)	Hudson 1982, pp. xxxvii & 62	
Calvi, Carlo (1612–1669)	(1646) "La moda" e Sua chiaccona in D major for guitar, from Intavolatura di chitarra e chitarriglia (Bologna, 1646)	Hudson 1982, pp. xxxvii & 62–63	
Calvi, Carlo (1612–1669)	(1646) "La mia donna importuna" e Sua chiaccona in C major for guitar, from Intavolatura di chitarra e chitarriglia (Bologna, 1646)	Hudson 1982, pp. xxxvii & 63	
Rossi, Luigi (c. 1597–1653)	(1647) "Al imperio d'amore," chaconne from act 2 of the opera Orfeo (Paris, 1647)		The Dublin Drag Orchestra, The Lost Discs (CD, Heresy Records, 2012)
Schütz, Heinrich (1585–1672)	(1647) "Es steh Gott auf," chaconne (based on Monteverdi's "Zefiro torna") from Symphoniarum sacrarum II, op. 10 (Dresden, 1647)	Bittinger 1960, SWV 356	Michel Becquet, Les Sacqueboutiers, La Sacqueboute (CD, Flora, 2012)
Corbetta, Francesco (c. 1615–1681)	(1648) Chiacona in C major for guitar, from Varii scherzi de sonate per la chitara spagnola (Brussels, 1648)	Hudson 1982, pp. xxxvii & 64–65	
1650–59
Falconieri, Andrea (1585/86–1656)	(1650) Ciaccona for 2 violins and continuo, from Il primo libro de canzone, sinfonie, fantasie (Naples, 1650)	Hudson 1982, pp. xxxvii & 65–68	Jordi Savall, Hesperion XXI, Ostinato: Falconiero, Marini, Merula, Ortiz, Pachelbel, Purcell, Valenti & anonimi (CD, Alia Vox, 2002)
Pellegrini, Domenico (c. 1600 – c. 1662)	(1650) Chiaccona in parte varíate alla vera spagnuola in C major for guitar, from Armoniosi concerti sopra la chitarra spagnuola (Bologna, 1650)	Hudson 1982, pp. xxxvii & 69–71	
anonymous	(c. 1650) Ciaccone in G major for cittern, from a manuscript in the Biblioteca Nazionale Centrale, Florence	Hudson 1982, pp. xxxvii & 71	
Granata, Giovanni Battista (1620/21–1687)	(1651) Caprici di Ciacone in C major for guitar, from Nuova scielta di capricci armonici (Bologna, 1651)	Hudson 1982, pp. xxxviii & 72	
Giamberti, Giuseppe (1600–1662)	(1657) Ciaccona for two melody instruments, from Duo (Rome, 1657)	Hudson 1982, pp. xxxviii & 73–74	
anonymous	(1657) "Ciaccona di Paradiso e dell'Inferno," from Canzonette spirituali e morali, [ed. Francesco Ratis] (Milan, 1657)		L'Arpeggiata, Via Crucis (CD, Warner, 2010)
Granata, Giovanni Battista (1620/21–1687)	(1659) Capriccio sopra la chiaccona in C major for guitar with bass courses, from Soavi concenti . . . per la chitarra spagnuola (Bologna, 1659)	Hudson 1982, pp. xxxviii & 75–78	
Cazzati, Maurizio (1616–1678)	(1659) Ciaccona a tre con il suo balletto, for 2 violins & violone, from Correnti, balletti, galiarde a 3 è 4 (Venice, 1659)	Cazzati 1971, final piece	
Couperin, Louis (1626–1661)	(c. 1650s) Chaconne in C major for harpsichord (Paris)	Gustafson 1979, Couperin no. 26	
Couperin, Louis (1626–1661)	(c. 1650s) "La bergeronnette," chaconne in c minor for harpsichord (Paris)	Gustafson 1979, Couperin no. 34	Bob van Asperen, Louis Couperin Edition, vol. 3 (CD, Aeolus, 2013)
Couperin, Louis (1626–1661)	(c. 1650s) Chaconne in d minor for harpsichord (Paris)	Gustafson 1979, Couperin no. 55	Bob van Asperen, Louis Couperin Edition, vol. 1 (CD, Aeolus, 2007)
Couperin, Louis (1626–1661)	(c. 1650s) "La complaignante," chaconne in d minor for harpsichord (Paris)	Gustafson 1979, Couperin no. 57	
Couperin, Louis (1626–1661)	(c. 1650s) Chaconne in D major for harpsichord (Paris)	Gustafson 1979, Couperin no. 62	Richard Egarr, Four Harpsichord Suites for the Sun King (CD, Globe, 1996)
Couperin, Louis (1626–1661)	(c. 1650s) Chaconne in F major for harpsichord (Paris)	Gustafson 1979, Couperin no. 78	Bob van Asperen, Louis Couperin Edition, vol. 1 (CD, Aeolus, 2007)
Couperin, Louis (1626–1661)	(c. 1650s) Chaconne in F major for harpsichord (Paris)	Gustafson 1979, Couperin no. 80	Bob van Asperen, Louis Couperin Edition, vol. 1 (CD, Aeolus, 2007)
Couperin, Louis (1626–1661)	(c. 1650s) Chaconne in G major for harpsichord (Paris)	Gustafson 1979, Couperin no. 89	Bob van Asperen, Louis Couperin Edition, vol. 1 (CD, Aeolus, 2007)
Couperin, Louis (1626–1661)	(c. 1650s) Chaconne ou passacaille in g minor for harpsichord (Paris)	Gustafson 1979, Couperin no. 96	Bob van Asperen, Louis Couperin Edition, vol. 2 (CD, Aeolus, 2008)
Couperin, Louis (1626–1661)	(c. 1650s) Chaconne in g minor for harpsichord (Paris)	Gustafson 1979, Couperin no. 121	Bob van Asperen, Louis Couperin Edition, vol. 3 (CD, Aeolus, 2013)
1660–69
Chambonnières, Jacques Champion de (1601–1672)	(c. 1660) Chaconne in C major for harpsichord, from the manuscript Bauyn in the Bibliothèque nationale, Paris	Chambonnières 2009	
Chambonnières, Jacques Champion de (1601–1672)	(c. 1660) Chaconne in F major for harpsichord, from the manuscript Bauyn in the Bibliothèque nationale, Paris	Chambonnières 2009	Davitt Moroney, Marc Roger Normand Couperin: Livre de Tablature de Clavescin (CD, Hyperion, 1999)
Chambonnières, Jacques Champion de (1601–1672)	(c. 1660) (Another) chaconne in F major for harpsichord, from the manuscript Bauyn in the Bibliothèque nationale, Paris	Chambonnières 2009	
Chambonnières, Jacques Champion de (1601–1672)	(c. 1660) Chaconne in G major for harpsichord, from the manuscript Bauyn in the Bibliothèque nationale, Paris	Chambonnières 2009	
Cazzati, Maurizio (1616–1678)	(1660) Ciaccona in E^{♭} major for 2 violins & violone, from Trattenimenti per camera d'arie, correnti, e balletti (Bologna, 1660)	Cazzati 2011, pp. 16–17	L'Arpeggiata, All'Improvviso: Ciaccone, Bergamasche . . . & un po' di Follie (CD, Alpha, 2004)
anonymous	(1662) Chiaccona a 3, in C major for 2 violins, viola, & continuo, from the manuscript "Partiturbuch Ludwig" (1662) in the Herzog August Bibliothek, Wolfenbüttel	Anonymous 2014	
Schmelzer, Johann Heinrich (c. 1623–1680)	(1664) Mvt. 1. [Ciaccona], in Sonata no. 4 in D major for violin & continuo, from Sonatae unarum fidium (Nuremberg, 1664)	Schmelzer 2012, pp. 20–23	Hélène Schmitt et al., Johann Heinrich Schmelzer: Sonatae a violino solo (CD, Alpha, 2007)
Storace, Bernardo (dates unknown)	(1664) Ciaccona in C major for keyboard, from Selva di varie compositioni per cimbalo ed organo (Venice, 1664)	Storace 2014	Fabio Bonizzoni, Storace: "Selva Di Varie Compositione" (CD, Glossa, 2003)
Lully, Jean-Baptiste (1632–1687)	(1667) Chaconne in C major, from Trios de la chambre du Roi (Paris, 1667)	Schneider 1981, LWV 35:9	
1670–79
Schmelzer, Johann Heinrich (c. 1623–1680)	(c. 1670) Ciaconna a 3 chori, in D major, from a manuscript in the Chrám sv. Mořice (Church of St. Maurice), Kroměříž, Czech Republic	Brewer 2011, p. 153	Tafelmusik, J. H. Schmelzer: Sonatas, Balletti francesi, Ciaconna (CD, Sony Classical, 1993)
Lully, Jean-Baptiste (1632–1687)	(1670) "Chaconne des Scaramouches," incidental music in G major for the play of Molière, Le Bourgeois gentilhomme (Paris, 1670)	Schneider 1981, LWV 43:36	
Corbetta, Francesco (c. 1615–1681)	(1670) Caprice de chaconne in D major for guitar, from La guitarre royalle dédiée au Roy de la Grande Bretagne (Paris, 1670)	Corbetta 1975, pp. 72–73	William Carter, Francesco Corbetta: La Guitarre Royalle (CD, Linn, 2004)
Corbetta, Francesco (c. 1615–1681)	(1670) Chaconne in C major for guitar, from La guitarre royalle dédiée au Roy de la Grande Bretagne (Paris, 1670)	Corbetta 1975, p. 75	William Carter, Francesco Corbetta: La Guitarre Royalle (CD, Linn, 2004)
Corbetta, Francesco (c. 1615–1681)	(1674) Chacone in C major for guitar, from La guitarre royalle dediée au Roy (Paris, 1674)	Hudson 1982, pp. xxxviii & 102–103	William Carter, Francesco Corbetta: La Guitarre Royalle (CD, Linn, 2004)
Sanz, Gaspar (1640–1710)	(1674) Chacona in A major for guitar, from Instrucción de música sobre la guitarra española (Saragossa, 1674)	Hudson 1982, pp. xxxix & 103	
Pezel, Johann Christoph (1639–1694)	(1675) Ciacona in A major for two violins and continuo, from Bicinia variorum instrumentorum (Leipzig, 1675)	Hudson 1982, pp. xxxix & 104	
Pezel, Johann Christoph (1639–1694)	(1675) Ciacona in B^{♭} major for two violins and continuo, from Bicinia variorum instrumentorum (Leipzig, 1675)	Hudson 1982, pp. xxxix & 105	
Kerll, Johann Caspar (1627–1693)	(1676) Ciaccona in C major for organ, from a manuscript in the ?, Vienna (1676)	Kerll 2011	Rinaldo Alessandrini, Chaconne (CD, Naïve, 2010)
Ruiz de Ribayaz, Lucas (1626 – after 1677)	(1677) Chaconas in C major for harp, from Luz y norte musical (Madrid, 1677)	Hudson 1982, pp. xxxix & 106	Andrew Lawrence-King, The Harp Consort, Spanish Dances: Selections from Ruiz de Ribayaz's "Luz y norte" (CD, BMG Music, 1995)
anonymous	(1679) Ciaccona in B^{♭} major for violin and continuo, from a manuscript in the British Library, London (1679)	Hudson 1982, pp. xxxviii & 79–83	
1680–89
Vitali, Giovanni Battista (1632–1692)	(c. 1680) Chiacona per la lettera B (in C major) for viola de gamba, from a manuscript in the Biblioteca Estense, Modena	Hudson 1982, pp. xxxviii & 84	
Mouton, Charles (c. 1626–1710)	(c. 1680) Chaconne in a minor for lute, from Pièces de luth sur différents modes, livre 1 (Paris, c. 1680)	Mouton 2001, p. 12	Hopkinson Smith, Charles Mouton: Pièces de luth (CD, Naïve-Astrée Auvidis, 2002)
Mouton, Charles (c. 1626–1710)	(c. 1680) "La belle espagnole," chaconne in c minor for lute, from Pièces de luth sur différents modes, livre 1 (Paris, c. 1680)	Mouton 2001, pp. 24–25	Konrad Junghänel, Pièces de luth: Französische Lautenmusik 17. Jh. (CD, Deutsche Harmonia Mundi, 1989)
Purcell, Henry (1659–1695)	(1680) Chacony a 4 in g minor for strings and continuo, from Fantasies and In nomines (London, 1680)	Zimmerman 1963, Z 730	Musica Antiqua Köln, Chaconne: Blow, Corelli, Muffat, Pezel, Purcell, Lully, Marini, Mayr (CD, Arkiv, 1997 & Deutsche Grammophon, 2010)
Purcell, Henry (1659–1695)	(c. 1680) Chaconne-Sonata in g minor for 2 violins, viola, and continuo (London, written c. 1680)	Zimmerman 1963, Z 807	Musica Antiqua Köln, Chaconne: Blow, Corelli, Muffat, Pezel, Purcell, Lully, Marini, Mayr (CD, Arkiv, 1997 & Deutsche Grammophon, 2010)
Charpentier, Marc-Antoine (1643–1704)	(1680) Chaconne, "Sans frayeur dans ce bois," for soprano and continuo (Paris, 1680)	Hitchcock 1982, H 467	
Vitali, Giovanni Battista (1632–1692)	(1682) Ciaccona in C major for two violins and continuo, from Varie partite del passemezo, ciaccona, capricii, e passgalli, a tre (Modena, 1682)	Hudson 1982, pp. xxxviii & 85–90	
Visée, Robert de (1655–1732/33)	(1682) Chaconne in F major, from Livre de guittarre, dédié au roi (Paris, 1682)	Visée 2008, p. 73	David Jacques, Robert de Visée: The Complete Works for Guitar (3 CDs, Disques XXI, 2007)
Visée, Robert de (1655–1732/33)	(1682) Mvt. 7. Chacone, in Suite 7 in G major from Livre de guittarre dédié au roi (Paris, 1682)	Visée 2008, pp. 80–81	David Jacques, Robert de Visée: The Complete Works for Guitar (3 CDs, Disques XXI, 2007)
Kusser, Johann Sigismund (1660–1727)	(1682) Mvt. 9. Chaconne, in Suite 2 in B^{♭} major for orchestra, from Composition de musique suivant la méthode françoise (Stuttgart, 1682)		Les Enchantants, Johann Sigismund Kusser: Composition de musique (CD, Musicaphon, 2006)
Lully, Jean-Baptiste (1632–1687)	(1683) Chaconne in G major for orchestra, from the opera Phaëton (Paris, 1683)	Schneider 1981, LWV 61:40	Musica Antiqua Köln, Chaconne: Blow, Corelli, Muffat, Pezel, Purcell, Lully, Marini, Mayr (CD, Arkiv, 1997 & Deutsche Grammophon, 2010)
Gallot, Jacques (c. 1625 – after 1690)	(1684) "Le doge de Venise," chaconne in f^{♯} minor for lute, from Pièces de luth composées sur differens modes (Paris, [1684])	Gallot 1978, pp. 25–28	Joachim Held, Musique pour le Roi: French Lute Music of the Baroque (CD, Haenssler Classics, 2009)
Gallot, Jacques (c. 1625 – after 1690)	(1684) "La Montespan," chaconne in a minor for lute, from Pièces de luth composées sur differens modes (Paris, [1684])	Gallot 1978, pp. 57–58	Rolf Lislevand, La Belle Homicide (CD, Naïve, 2003)
Lully, Jean-Baptiste (1632–1687)	(1685) Chaconne in G major for orchestra, from Act 3 of the opera Roland (Paris, 1685)	Schneider 1981, LWV 65:56	Christophe Rousset, Les Talens Lyriques, Les Musiques de Louis XIV: Du Ballet à l'Opéra (CD, Naïve, 2009)
Charpentier, Marc-Antoine (1643–1704)	(1685) Chaconne, from the opera Les arts florissants (Paris, 1685)	Hitchcock 1982, H 487	William Christie, Les Arts Florissants, M.-A. Charpentier: Les Arts Florissants (CD, Harmonia Mundi France, 1992)
Corelli, Arcangelo (1653–1713)	(1685) Ciacona in G major, sonata no. 12, from the Sonate da camera a tre: doi violini, e violone o cembalo, op. 2 (Rome, 1685)	Corelli 1685	Musica Antiqua Köln, Chaconne: Blow, Corelli, Muffat, Pezel, Purcell, Lully, Marini, Mayr (CD, Arkiv, 1997 & Deutsche Grammophon, 2010)
Visée, Robert de (1655–1732/33)	(1686) Mvt. 7. Chaconne, in Suite 9 in g minor, from Livre de pieces pour la guittarre, dédié au roi (Paris, 1686)	Visée 2008, pp. 102–103	David Jacques, Robert de Visée: The Complete Works for Guitar (3 CDs, Disques XXI, 2007)
Lully, Jean-Baptiste (1632–1687)	(1686) "Qu'une injuste fierté," chaconne, from Act 2 of the opera Acis et Galatée (Paris, 1686)	Schneider 1981, LWV 73:32	Marc Minkowski, Musiciens du Louvre, Lully: "Acis et Galatée" (CD, DG Arkiv, 2006)
Steffani, Agostino (1654–1728)	(1686) "Ogni core può sperar," ciaccona in F major, from act 2 of the opera Servio Tullio (Munich, 1686)		Cecilia Bartoli, Diego Fasolis, I Barocchisti, Mission (CD, Decca, 2012)
Pezel, Johann Christoph (1639–1694)	(1686) Sonata-Ciacona in B^{♭} major, from Opus Musicum Sonatarum Praestantissimarum (Frankfurt am Main, 1686)	Pezel 1686, final piece in each part (each part is separately paginated)	Musica Antiqua Köln, Chaconne: Blow, Corelli, Muffat, Pezel, Purcell, Lully, Marini, Mayr (CD, Arkiv, 1997 & Deutsche Grammophon, 2010)
Jacquet de la Guerre, Élisabeth (1665–1729)	(1687) "L’Inconstante," Mvt. 8. Chaconne in Suite No. 1 in d minor, from Pièces de clavessin, livre 1 (Paris, 1687)	Jacquet de la Guerre 2007	Karen Flint, Le Clavecin Français: Elizabeth Jacquet de la Guerre's Complete Works for Harpsichord (CD, Plectra, 2010)
Jacquet de la Guerre, Élisabeth (1665–1729)	(1687) Mvt. 7. Chaconne, in Suite No. 3 in a minor, from Pièces de clavessin, livre 1 (Paris, 1687)	Jacquet de la Guerre 2007	Karen Flint, Le Clavecin Français: Elizabeth Jacquet de la Guerre's Complete Works for Harpsichord (CD, Plectra, 2010)
Charpentier, Marc-Antoine (1643–1704)	(1688) Chaconne, from act 2 of the opera David et Jonathas (Paris, 1688)	Hitchcock 1982, H 490	William Christie, Les Arts Florissants, Marc-Antoine Charpentier: David & Jonathas (2 CDs, Harmonia Mundi, 1998)
Matteis, Nicola (c. 1650 – c. 1714)	(1688) "Diverse bizzarie sopra la vecchia sarabanda o pur ciaccona," from Arie diverse per il violino, libro 1 (London, 1688)	Matteis 2011	The Palladian Ensemble, An Excess of Pleasure (CD, Linn, 1995)
Marais, Marin (1656–1728)	(1686) Chaconne in G major, for two violas da gamba and continuo, no. 47 from the Pièces de viole, Livre 1 (Paris, 1686)	Marais 1686	Jordi Savall, Christophe Coin, Ton Koopman, & Hopkinson Smith, Marin Marais: Pièces à deux violes du premier livre, 1686 (CD, Astrée, 1989)
Anglebert, Jean-Henri d' (1629–1691)	(1689) Mvt 10. Chaconne en rondeau, in Suite 1 in G major, from Pièces de clavecin (Paris, [1689])	Anglebert & n.d. [1689]	Christophe Rousset, D'Anglebert: Intégrale des "Pièces De Clavecin" (2 CDs, L'Oiseau Lyre, 2000)
Anglebert, Jean-Henri d' (1629–1691)	(1689) Mvt. 16. Chaconne de Phaeton de M. de Lully, in Suite 1 in G major, from Pièces de clavecin (Paris, [1689])	Anglebert & n.d. [1689]	Christophe Rousset, D'Anglebert: Intégrale des "Pièces De Clavecin" (2 CDs, L'Oiseau Lyre, 2000)
Anglebert, Jean-Henri d' (1629–1691)	(1689) Mvt. 6. Chaconne de Galatée de M. de Lully, in Suite 4 in D major, from Pièces de clavecin (Paris, [1689])	Anglebert & n.d. [1689]	Christophe Rousset, D'Anglebert: Intégrale des "Pièces De Clavecin" (2 CDs, L'Oiseau Lyre, 2000)
Anglebert, Jean-Henri d' (1629–1691)	(1689) Mvt. 7. Chaconne en rondeau, in Suite 4 in D major, from Pièces de clavecin (Paris, [1689])	Anglebert & n.d. [1689]	Christophe Rousset, D'Anglebert: Intégrale des "Pièces De Clavecin" (2 CDs, L'Oiseau Lyre, 2000)
Anglebert, Jean-Henri d' (1629–1691)	(1689) Chaconne du vieux Gautier in C major for harpsichord, from the manuscript version of Pièces de clavecin		Christophe Rousset, D'Anglebert: Intégrale des "Pièces De Clavecin" (2 CDs, L'Oiseau Lyre, 2000)
Mazzella, Salvatore (of Naples, dates unknown)	(1689) Ciaccona alla spagnola in C major for violin and continuo, from Balli, correnti, gighe, sarabande, gavotte, brande, e gagliarde (Rome, 1689)	Hudson 1982, pp. xxxviii & 91–92	
anonymous	(c. 1689) 2 chacones, both in C major, for keyboard, from a manuscript in the Bibliothèque du conservatoire national de musique, Paris	Hudson 1982, pp. xxxix & 111–114	
1690–99
Muffat, Georg (1653–1704)	(1690) Ciacona in G major for organ, from Apparatus Musico-Organisticus (Vienna, 1690)	Muffat 1690, pp. 54–55	Martin Haselböck, Georg Muffat: Organ Works, vol. 2 (CD, Naxos, 2000)
Purcell, Henry (1659–1695)	(1690) Chaconne in ? for 2 recorders from act 3 of the semi-opera Prophetess or The History of Dioclesian (London, 1690)	Zimmerman 1963, Z 627	Collegium Musicum 90, "Dioclesian," complete; Masque from "Timon of Athens" (2 CDs, Chandos, 1995)
Lalande, Michel-Richard de (1657–1726)	(1691) Chaconne in D^{♯} major for trumpets, timpani and continuo, from a manuscript in the Bibliothèque nationale, Paris (1691)	Hudson 1982, pp. xxxix & 115–118	
Purcell, Henry (1659–1695)	(1691) Chaconne in F major for 2 violins, viola, continuo, from the prelude to the semi-opera King Arthur or The British Worthy (London, 1691)	Zimmerman 1963, Z 628	The English Concert, Purcell: King Arthur (2 CDs, Brilliant Classics, 2009)
Purcell, Henry (1659–1695)	(1691) Chaconne in f minor for 2 violins, viola, continuo, from the prelude to the semi-opera King Arthur or The British Worthy (London, 1691)	Zimmerman 1963, Z 628	
Purcell, Henry (1659–1695)	(1691) Chaconne in d minor for 2 violins, viola, and continuo, from incidental music for the play The Gordian Knot Unty'd (London, 1691)	Zimmerman 1963, Z 597	Academy of Ancient Music, Purcell: Theatre Music (6 CDs, L'Oiseau-Lyre, 1990)
Purcell, Henry (1659–1695)	(1692) "Dance for Chinese Man & Woman," chaconne in C major for 2 violins, viola, continuo, from act 5 of semi-opera Fairy-Queen (London, 1692)	Zimmerman 1963, Z 629	Roger Norrington, Schütz Choir of London, London Classical Players, Purcell: The Fairy Queen (2 CDs, Virgin Classics, 1994)
Marais, Marin (1656–1728)	(1692) Mvt. 10. Chaconne, in Suite no. 1 in C major, from Pièces en trio pour les flutes, violon et dessus de viole (Paris, 1692)	Marais 1692	Musica Pacifica, Marin Marais: Pièces en trio (2 CDs, Virgin, 1997)
Marais, Marin (1656–1728)	(1692) Chaconne, in Suite no. 6 in B^{♭} major, from Pièces en trio pour les flutes, violon et dessus de viole (Paris, 1692)	Marais 1692	Musica Pacifica, Marin Marais: Pièces en trio (2 CDs, Virgin, 1997)
Erlebach, Philipp Heinrich (1657–1714)	(1693) Mvt. 10. Chaconne, in Overture II in B^{♭} major for 6 stringed instruments, from VI Ouvertures (Nürnberg, 1693)	Erlebach 2004	
Erlebach, Philipp Heinrich (1657–1714)	(1693) Mvt. 9. Chaconne, in Overture V in F major for 6 stringed instruments, from VI Ouvertures (Nürnberg, 1693)	Erlebach 2004	The Bach Players, Every One a Chaconne (CD, Hyphen, 2009)
Erlebach, Philipp Heinrich (1657–1714)	(1693) Mvt. 9. Chaconne, in Overture VI in g minor for 6 stringed instruments, from VI Ouvertures (Nürnberg, 1693)	Erlebach 2004	
Charpentier, Marc-Antoine (1643–1704)	(1694) Chaconne, from act 2 of the opera Médée (Paris, 1694)	Hitchcock 1982, H 491	William Christie, Les Arts Florissants, Marc-Antoine Charpentier: Médée (3 CDs, Erato, 1995 & Harmonia Mundi, 1999)
Muffat, Georg (1653–1604)	(1695) Mvt. 7. Chaconne, in Suite 4 in B^{♭} major, "Impatientia," from Florilegium Primum (Augsburg, 1695)	Muffat 2008, p. 40	
Muffat, Georg (1653–1604)	(1695) Mvt. 4. Chaconne, in Suite 6 in G major, "Blanditiae," from Florilegium Primum (Augsburg, 1695)	Muffat 2008, p. 56	Musica Antiqua Köln, Chaconne: Blow, Corelli, Muffat, Pezel, Purcell, Lully, Marini, Mayr (CD, Arkiv, 1997 & Deutsche Grammophon, 2010)
Fischer, Johann Caspar Ferdinand (c. 1656–1746)	(1695) Mvt. 6. Chaconne, in Suite 1 in C major for 2 violins, 2 violas, continuo, from Le journal du printemps (Augsburg, 1695)	Fischer 2007–2012	Michi Gaigg, Orfeo Barockorchester, Johann Caspar Ferdinand Fischer: Le Journal du Printemps (CD, CPO, 2007)
Fischer, Johann Caspar Ferdinand (c. 1656–1746)	(1695) Mvt. 4. Chaconne, in Suite 3 in B^{♭} major for 2 violins, 2 violas, continuo, from Le journal du printemps (Augsburg, 1695)	Fischer 2007–2012	Michi Gaigg, Orfeo Barockorchester, Johann Caspar Ferdinand Fischer: Le Journal du Printemps (CD, CPO, 2007)
Fischer, Johann Caspar Ferdinand (c. 1656–1746)	(1695) Mvt. 3. Chaconne, in Suite 5 in G major for 2 violins, 2 violas, continuo, from Le journal du printemps (Augsburg, 1695)	Fischer 2007–2012	James Johnstone, John Blow's Anthology (CD, Meridian, 2009)
Fischer, Johann Caspar Ferdinand (c. 1656–1746)	(1696) Mvt. 2. Chaconne, in Suite 8 in G major for harpsichord, from Pièces de clavessin (Schlackenwerth, 1696)		William Christie, Fischer: Pièces de clavecin (CD, Musique d'abord, 1980)
Purcell, Henry (1659–1695)	(1696) Chaconne in g minor for harpsichord (London, published posthumously, 1696)	Zimmerman 1963, ZT 680	Richard Egarr, Purcell: Keyboard Suites & Grounds (CD, Harmonia Mundi, 2008)
Biber, Heinrich Ignaz Franz (1644–1704)	(1696) Mvt. 6. Ciaccona, in Partita no. 3 in A major for 7 string instruments, from Harmonia artificioso-ariosa (written 1696)	Chafe 1987, C 64	Musica Antiqua Köln, Biber: Harmonia Artificiosa (CD, Arkiv, 2004)
Lalande, Michel-Richard de (1657–1726)	(1698) Chaconne in G major for orchestra, from incidental music for the play Mirtil et Mélicerte (Paris, 1698)	Hudson 1982, pp. xxxix & 119–124	
Buxtehude, Dieterich (c. 1638–1707)	(1690s?) Prelude, Fugue, and Ciacona in C Major for organ	Karstädt 1985, BuxWV 137	Walter Kraft, Buxtehude: Complete Organ Music (6 CDs, Vox, 2007)
Buxtehude, Dieterich (c. 1638–1707)	(1690s?) Ciacona in c minor for organ	Karstädt 1985, BuxWV 159	Walter Kraft, Buxtehude: Complete Organ Music (6 CDs, Vox, 2007)
Buxtehude, Dieterich (c. 1638–1707)	(1690s?) Ciacona in e minor for organ	Karstädt 1985, BuxWV 160	Walter Kraft, Buxtehude: Complete Organ Music (6 CDs, Vox, 2007)
Pachelbel, Johann (1653–1706)	(1690s) Mvt. 5. Ciaconna, in Partie 4 in e minor for 2 violins and continuo, from Musicalische Ergötzung (1690s)	Tsukamoto 2002, T 334	Pro Arte Antiqua Praha, Pachelbel: Chamber Music Works (CD, Pony Canyon, 1996)
Pachelbel, Johann (1653–1706)	(1690s) Mvt. 4. Ciaconna, in Partie 5 in C major for 2 violins and continuo, from Musicalische Ergötzung (1690s)	Tsukamoto 2002, T 335	Pro Arte Antiqua Praha, Pachelbel: Chamber Music Works (CD, Pony Canyon, 1996)
Pachelbel, Johann (1653–1706)	(1699) Chaconne in C major for organ, from Hexachordum Apollinis (Nuremberg, 1699)	Tsukamoto 2002, T 201	Antoine Bouchard, Pachelbel: The Complete Organ Works, v. 2 (CD, Dorian, 1999)
Pachelbel, Johann (1653–1706)	(1699) Chaconne in D major for organ, no. 1, from Hexachordum Apollinis (Nuremberg, 1699)	Tsukamoto 2002, T 202	Antoine Bouchard, Pachelbel: The Complete Organ Works, v. 7 (CD, Dorian, 2000)
16??
Piccinini, Alessandro (1566 – c. 1638), probable composer	(16??) Ciachone for lute, from a manuscript in Modena (date unknown)	Archivo di Stato (Modena, Italy) et al. 1999, pp. 57–59	Francesca Torelli, Alessandro Piccinini: Intavolatura di liuto e di chitarrone, libro secondo (CD, Tactus, 2012)
Gaultier, Ennemond (1575–1651)	(16??) Chaconne in F major for lute, "Cascade de M. de Launay," from the manuscript Vaudry de Saizenay, Bibliothèque de la Ville de Besançon (1682–86)	Gaultier 1966, pp. xxiii, 61–63	Anthony Bailes, Apollon Orateur (CD, Ramée, 2010)
Gaultier, Ennemond (1575–1651)	(16??) Chaconne in C major for lute, from the manuscript Vaudry de Saizenay, Bibliothèque de la Ville de Besançon (1682–86)	Gaultier 1966, pp. xxiii, 60	Anthony Bailes, Apollon Orateur (CD, Ramée, 2010)
Gaultier, Ennemond (1575–1651)	(16??) Chaconne in C major for harpsichord, from the manuscript "Pièces de clavecin de différents auteurs" in the Bibliothèque nationale, Paris (undated)	Gaultier 1966, pp. xxvi, 109	
Frescobaldi, Girolamo (1583–1643)	(16??) Ciaccona in G major for harpsichord, from a manuscript in the Bibliothèque nationale de France, Paris	Silberger 2010–2014, F 13.21	
Frescobaldi, Girolamo (1583–1643), probable composer	(16??) Ciaccona in C major for harpsichord, from a manuscript in the Biblioteca Apostolica Vaticana, Rome	Silberger 2010–2014, F 14.47	
Frescobaldi, Girolamo (1583–1643), possible composer	(16??) Ciaccona in G major for harpsichord, from a manuscript in the Biblioteca nazionale Marciana, Venice	Silberger 2010–2014, F 17.57	
Caccini, Francesca (1587–1641)	(16??) Ciaccona		Elena Cecchi Fedi & Cappella di Santa Maria degli Angiolini, Francesca Caccini: Maria, dolce Maria (CD, Brilliant Classics, 2013)
Ferrini, Giovanni Battista (c. 1601–1674)	(16??) Ciaccona in F major for keyboard (undated)	Ferrini 2009	
Gaultier, Denis (c. 1603–1672), probable composer	(16??) Ciaconne in A minor for lute, from a manuscript in the Bibliothèque nationale, Paris (undated)	Hudson 1982, pp. xxxviii & 96–98	
Bertali, Antonio (1605–1669)	(16??) Chiacona in C major for violin and continuo (undated)	Hines 2008	L'Arpeggiata, All'Improvviso: Ciaccone, Bergamasche . . . & un po' di Follie (CD, Alpha, 2004)
La Pierre, Paul de (c. 1620–1689)	(16??) Chaconne in d minor for harpsichord, from the manuscript "Livre de tablature de clavescin" by Marc-Roger Normand Couperin (c. 1690s)	Couperin 1998, pp. 21v–24v	Davitt Moroney, Marc Roger Normand Couperin: Livre de Tablature de Clavescin (CD, Hyperion, 1999)
La Pierre, Paul de (c. 1620–1689)	(16??) Chaconne in G major for harpsichord, from the manuscript "Livre de tablature de clavescin" by Marc-Roger Normand Couperin (c. 1690s)	Couperin 1998, pp. 47v–48v	Davitt Moroney, Marc Roger Normand Couperin: Livre de Tablature de Clavescin (CD, Hyperion, 1999)
Schmelzer, Johann Heinrich (c. 1623–1680)	(16??) Ciaccona in A major for violin, from a manuscript in Vienna (undated)		Hélène Schmitt et al., Johann Heinrich Schmelzer: Sonatae a violino solo (CD, Alpha, 2007)
Gallot, Jacques (c. 1625 – after 1690)	(16??) "La comète," chaconne for lute, from a manuscript in the Musikbibliothek, Städtische Bibliotheken, Leipzig (undated)		Hopkinson Smith, Jacques de Gallot: Pièces de luth (CD, Astrée Auvidis, 1994)
Gallot, Jacques (c. 1625 – after 1690)	(16??) "Dialogue, ou La Mouche," chaconne in c minor for lute, from the manuscript Barbe, Bibliothèque nationale, Paris (c. 1690)	Gallot 2006, p. 8	
Gallot, Jacques (c. 1625 – after 1690)	(16??) "Le petit seraille," chaconne in f minor for lute, from ?		Catherine Liddell, La Belle Voilée: 17th Century French Lute Music (CD, Centaur, 1997)
Launay, Henry de (dates unknown)	(16??) "Cascades," chaconne in ? for lute, from ?		Catherine Liddell, La Belle Voilée: 17th Century French Lute Music (CD, Centaur, 1997)
Capricornus (Latinization of Bockshorn), Samuel Friedrich (1628–1665)	(16??) Chaconne in D major for violin, viola da gamba, continuo, from a manuscript in the Herzog August Bibliothek, Wolfenbüttel (undated)	Capricornus 2011	
Lully, Jean-Baptiste (1632–1687)	(16??) Chaconne in C major, from a manuscript in the Bibliothèque nationale, Paris (undated)	Schneider 1981, LWV 74:42	
Lully, Jean-Baptiste (1632–1687)	(16??) Chaconne italienne in G major, from a manuscript in the Bibliothèque municipale, Versailles (undated)	Schneider 1981, LWV 75:43	
Lully, Jean-Baptiste (1632–1687)	(16??) Chaconne, from a manuscript in the Bibliothèque Inguimbertine et Musée, Carpentras (undated)	Schneider 1981, LWV 75:44	
Lully, Jean-Baptiste (1632–1687)	(16??) Chaconne, from a manuscript in the Bibliothèque nationale, Paris (undated)	Schneider 1981, LWV 75:55	
Lully, Jean-Baptiste (1632–1687)	(16??) Petite chaconne italienne, from a manuscript in the St. Michael's College Library, Tenbury (undated)	Schneider 1981, LWV 78:14	
Geoffroy, Jean-Nicolas (1633–1694)	(16??) Mvt. 10. Chaconne, in Suite in c minor for harpsichord, from the "Livre des pièces de clavecin" manuscript in the Bibliothèque nationale, Paris (undated)	Geoffroy 2007, 1, pp. 14–15	Aurélien Delage, Geoffroy: Pièces de clavessin (CD, Passacaille, 2013)
Geoffroy, Jean-Nicolas (1633–1694)	(16??) Mvt. 11. Chaconne, in Suite in d minor for harpsichord, from the "Livre des pièces de clavecin" manuscript in the Bibliothèque nationale, Paris (undated)	Geoffroy 2007, 1, pp. 42–43	Aurélien Delage, Geoffroy: Pièces de clavessin (CD, Passacaille, 2013)
Geoffroy, Jean-Nicolas (1633–1694)	(16??) Chaconne in d minor for harpsichord, from the "Livre des pièces de clavecin" manuscript in the Bibliothèque nationale, Paris (undated)	Geoffroy 2007, 1, pp. 44–45	
Geoffroy, Jean-Nicolas (1633–1694)	(16??) Mvt. 11. Chaconne, in Suite in e minor for harpsichord, from the "Livre des pièces de clavecin" manuscript in the Bibliothèque nationale, Paris (undated)	Geoffroy 2007, 1 pp. 74–75	
Geoffroy, Jean-Nicolas (1633–1694)	(16??) Mvt. 8. Chaconne, in Suite in f minor for harpsichord, from the "Livre des pièces de clavecin" manuscript in the Bibliothèque nationale, Paris (undated)	Geoffroy 2007, 1, pp. 92–93	
Geoffroy, Jean-Nicolas (1633–1694)	(16??) Mvt. 11. Chaconne, in Suite in F major for harpsichord, from the "Livre des pièces de clavecin" manuscript in the Bibliothèque nationale, Paris (undated)	Geoffroy 2007, 1, pp. 106–107	
Geoffroy, Jean-Nicolas (1633–1694)	(16??) Mvt. 10. Chaconne on 4 measures, in Suite in g minor, from the "Livre des pièces de clavecin" manuscript in the Bibliothèque nationale, Paris (undated)	Geoffroy 2007, 1, pp. 120–121	
Geoffroy, Jean-Nicolas (1633–1694)	(16??) Mvt. 19. Chaconne on 4 notes, in Suite in a minor, from the "Livre des pièces de clavecin" manuscript in the Bibliothèque nationale, Paris (undated)	Geoffroy 2007, 1, p. 162	
Geoffroy, Jean-Nicolas (1633–1694)	(16??) Mvt. 13. Chaconne, in Suite in A major for harpsichord, from the "Livre des pièces de clavecin" manuscript in the Bibliothèque nationale, Paris (undated)	Geoffroy 2007, 1, p. 176	
Geoffroy, Jean-Nicolas (1633–1694)	(16??) Mvt. 6. Chaconne, in Suite in B major for harpsichord, from the "Livre des pièces de clavecin" manuscript in the Bibliothèque nationale, Paris (undated)	Geoffroy 2007, 1, p. 196	
Geoffroy, Jean-Nicolas (1633–1694)	(16??) Mvt. 8. Chaconne, in Suite in F major for harpsichord, from the "Livre des pièces de clavecin" manuscript in the Bibliothèque nationale, Paris (undated)	Geoffroy 2007, 2, p. 10	
Geoffroy, Jean-Nicolas (1633–1694)	(16??) Mvt. 8. Chaconne, in Suite in g minor for harpsichord, from the "Livre des pièces de clavecin" manuscript in the Bibliothèque nationale, Paris (undated)	Geoffroy 2007, 2, pp. 22–23	Aurélien Delage, Geoffroy: Pièces de clavessin (CD, Passacaille, 2013)
Geoffroy, Jean-Nicolas (1633–1694)	(16??) Mvt. 7. Chaconne, in Suite in a minor for harpsichord, from the "Livre des pièces de clavecin" manuscript in the Bibliothèque nationale, Paris (undated)	Geoffroy 2007, 2, pp. 32–33	
Geoffroy, Jean-Nicolas (1633–1694)	(16??) Chaconne in C major on 4 notes for harpsichord, from the "Livre des pièces de clavecin" manuscript in the Bibliothèque nationale, Paris (undated)	Geoffroy 2007, 2, pp. 88–93	
Geoffroy, Jean-Nicolas (1633–1694)	(16??) Chaconne in D major on 4 notes for harpsichord, from the "Livre des pièces de clavecin" manuscript in the Bibliothèque nationale, Paris (undated)	Geoffroy 2007, 2, pp. 94–95	Hervé Niquet, Concert Spirituel Orchestra & Chorus Ensemble, Jean-Nicolas Geoffroy: Music for Choir and Organ (CD, Naxos, 1997)
Geoffroy, Jean-Nicolas (1633–1694)	(16??) Chaconne in G major on 4 notes for harpsichord, from the "Livre des pièces de clavecin" manuscript in the Bibliothèque nationale, Paris (undated)	Geoffroy 2007, 2, pp. 96–99	Ewa Mrowca, Jean-Nicolas Geoffroy: Pièces de clavessin (CD, Dux (U.K.), date?)
Geoffroy, Jean-Nicolas (1633–1694)	(16??) Chaconne in G major on 4 notes for harpsichord, from the "Livre des pièces de clavecin" manuscript in the Bibliothèque nationale, Paris (undated)	Geoffroy 2007, 2, pp. 101–113	
Geoffroy, Jean-Nicolas (1633–1694)	(16??) Mvt. 16. Chaconne, in Suite in G major for harpsichord, from the "Livre des pièces de clavecin" manuscript in the Bibliothèque nationale, Paris (undated)	Geoffroy 2007, 2, pp. 128–129	
Rittler, Philip Jacob (1637–1690)	(16??) Chaconne for 2 trumpets, 1 violin, 3 violas, 1 cello, and harpsichord (undated)	Rittler 1994	
Buxtehude, Dieterich (c. 1638–1707)	(16??) Laudate, pueri Dominum, cantata-ciacona in d minor for strings (undated)	Karstädt 1985, BuxWV 69	
Buxtehude, Dieterich (c. 1638–1707)	(16??) Quemadmodum desiderat cervus, cantata-chiaccona in F major for voice, 2 violins, continuo (undated)	Karstädt 1985, BuxWV 92	Victor Torres, Stylus Phantasticus, Dietrich Buxtehude: Ciaccona, "Il mondo che gira" (CD, Alpha, 2004)
Biber, Heinrich Ignaz Franz (1644–1704)	(16??) Ciacona in D major for violin and continuo, from a manuscript in Kroměříž, Czech Republic (undated)	Biber 2011	
Blow, John (1649–1708)	(16??) Chaconne in G major for 2 violins, viola, and continuo (undated)		Musica Antiqua Köln, Chaconne: Blow, Corelli, Muffat, Pezel, Purcell, Lully, Marini, Mayr (CD, Arkiv, 1997 & Deutsche Grammophon, 2010)
Blow, John (1649–1708)	(16??) Chacone in C major for harpsichord (undated), found in at least 3 manuscripts	Blow 1998, pp. 19–22	
Blow, John (1649–1708)	(16??) Chacone in F major for harpsichord (undated), found in at least 4 manuscripts	Blow 1998, pp. 54–59	Robert Woolley, John Blow: Music for Harpsichord and Spinet (CD, Meridian, 2003)
Blow, John (1649–1708)	(16??) Chacone in g minor for harpsichord (undated), found in at least 6 manuscripts	Blow 1998, pp. 89–91	Robert Woolley, John Blow: Music for Harpsichord and Spinet (CD, Meridian, 2003)
Blow, John (1649–1708)	(16??) Chacone in C major for harpsichord (undated), found in at least 7 manuscripts	Blow 1998, pp. 99–100	
Pachelbel, Johann (1653–1706)	(16??) Chaconne in D major for organ, no. 2 (undated)	Tsukamoto 2002, T 203	Antoine Bouchard, Pachelbel: The Complete Organ Works, v. 11 (CD, Dorian, 2001)
Pachelbel, Johann (1653–1706)	(16??) Chaconne in d minor for organ with 16 variations (undated)	Tsukamoto 2002, T 204	Antoine Bouchard, Pachelbel: The Complete Organ Works, v. 3 (CD, Dorian, 1999)
Pachelbel, Johann (1653–1706)	(16??) Chaconne in F major for organ (undated)	Tsukamoto 2002, T 205	Antoine Bouchard, Pachelbel: The Complete Organ Works, v. 4 (CD, Dorian, 1999)
Pachelbel, Johann (1653–1706)	(16??) Chaconne in f minor for organ with 22 variations (undated)	Tsukamoto 2002, T 206	Antoine Bouchard, Pachelbel: The Complete Organ Works, v. 1 (CD, Dorian, 1999)
Visée, Robert de(1655–1732/33)	(16??-17??) Chaconne in d minor for guitar, from a manuscript in the Bibliothèque nationale, Paris (undated)	Visée 2008, p. 138	David Jacques, Robert de Visée: The Complete Works for Guitar (3 CDs, Disques XXI, 2007)
Visée, Robert de (1655–1732/33)	(16??-17??) Chaconne in D major for guitar, from a manuscript in the Bibliothèque nationale, Paris (undated)	Visée 2008, p. 146	David Jacques, Robert de Visée: The Complete Works for Guitar (3 CDs, Disques XXI, 2007)

== Bibliography ==
- Anglebert, Jean-Henri d' (n.d.) [1689]. Pièces de clavecin. Paris: auteur.
- Anonymous (2014). Willis, Tim (ed.). "Chiaccona á 3. 2 Violini è Viola. Nr. 63 aus dem Parititurbuch Ludwig, 1662". International Music Score Library Project.
- Archivo di Stato (Modena, Italy); Kapsberger, G.; Piccinini, A.; Viviani, G. (1999). Intavolature di chitarrone: Mss. Modena. Florence: Studio per edizioni scelte.
- Biber, Heinrich Ignaz Franz (2011). Steinkühler, Simon (ed.). "Ciacona for Violin and Continuo". International Music Score Library Project.
- Bittinger, Werner (1960). Schütz-Werke-Verzeichnis (SWV). Kassel: Bärenreiter.
- Blow, John (1998). Klakowich, Robert (ed.). Complete Harpsichord Music. Musica Britannica, vol. 73. London: Stainer and Bell.
- Brewer, Charles (2011). The Instrumental Music of Schmeltzer, Biber, Muffat and Their Contemporaries. Farnham, Surrey, U.K.: Ashgate. ISBN 9781859283967.
- Capricornus, Samuel (2011). Grimbald (ed.). "Chaconne in D major". International Music Score Library Project.
- Cazzati, Maurizio (1971) [1659]. Correnti, balletti, galiarde a 3 è 4. Bologna: Antiquae Musicae Italicae Studios.
- Cazzati, Maurizio (2011). Zitellini, Rodolfo W. (ed.). "Trattenimenti per camera d'arie, correnti e balletti". International Music Score Library Project.
- Chafe, Eric Thomas (1987). The Church Music of Heinrich Biber. Ann Arbor: UMI Research Press.
- Chambonnières, Jacques Champion de (2009). Gouin, Pierre (ed.). "Pièces de clavecin du manuscrit Bauyn". International Music Score Library Project.
- Chilesotti, Oscar, ed. (1884–1914). Biblioteca di rarità musicali. Milan: Ricordi. 9 vols.
- Corbetta, Francesco (1975) [1671]. La guitarre royalle dédiée au Roy de la Grande Bretagne. Geneva: Minkoff.
- Corelli, Arcangelo (1685). Sonate da camera a trè, doi violini e violone ò cimbalo. Bologna: Monti.
- Couperin, Marc-Roger Normand (1998). Moroney, Davitt (ed.). Livre de tablature de clavescin de Monsieur de Druent, écrit par Couperin, c. 1695. Geneva: Minkoff.
- Erlebach, Philipp Heinrich (2004). Kimura, Mihoko (ed.). VI Ouvertures, begleitet mit ihren darzu schicklichen Airs. Offenburg, Germany: Edition Offenburg.
- Ferrari, Benedetto (1985) [1633, 1637, 1641]. Musiche varie, a voce sola, libri I, II, III. Florence: Studio per edizioni scelte. 3 vols. in 1.
- Ferrini, Giovanni Battista (2009). Stella, Simone (ed.). "Ciaccone". International Music Score Library Project.
- Fischer, Johann Caspar Ferdinand (2007–2012). Kompy; Tufvesson, John (eds.). "Le Journal du Printemps". International Music Score Library Project.
- Foscarini, Giovanni Paolo (1979) [1640]. Li cinque libri della chitarra alla spagnola. Florence: Studio per edizioni scelte.
- Gallot, Jacques (1978) [1684]. Pièces de luth, composées sur différents modes. Geneva: Minkoff.
- Gallot, Jacques (2006). Thomson, Kemer (ed.). "Music of Gallot le Vieux, from the Barbe Manuscript, ca. 1690" (PDF).
- Gaultier, Ennemond (1966). Souris, André; Rollin, Monique (eds.). Œuvres du vieux Gautier. Paris: Centre national de la recherche scientifique.
- Geoffroy, Jean-Nicolas (2007). Tilton, Mary (ed.). Works by Jean-Nicolas Geoffroy. New York: Broude Trust. 2 vols.
- Gustafson, Bruce (1979). French Harpsichord Music of the 17th Century: A Thematic Catalogue. Ann Arbor: UMI Research Press.
- Hines, Edith E. (2008). From Imitatio to Pronuntiatio: Background, Analysis, Interpretation, and Performance of Antonio Bertali's Chiacona for Violin and Continuo (Ph.D. dissertation). University of Wisconsin-Madison.
- Hitchcock, Hugh W. (1982). Les œuvres de Marc-Antoine Charpentier: Catalogue raisonné. Paris: Picard.
- Hudson, Richard (1982). The Folia, the Saraband, the Passacaglia, and the Chaconne: The Historical Evolution of Four Forms. Vol. 4: The Chaconne. Neuhausen-Stuttgart: Haenssler-Verlag.
- Jacquet de la Guerre, Élisabeth (2007). Wiberg, Steve (ed.). "Pièces de clavecin (1687)". International Music Score Library Project.
- Kapsberger, Giovanni Girolamo (2002). Civiol, Richard (ed.). "Libro Quarto d'Intavolatura di Chitarone, 2ème partie".
- Karstädt, Georg (1985). Thematisch-systematisches Verzeichnis der musikalischen Werke von Dietrich Buxtehude: Buxtehude-Werke-Verzeichnis (BuxWV) (2nd ed.). Wiesbaden: Breitkopf & Härtel.
- Kerll, Johann Caspar (2011). Gouin, Pierre (ed.). "Ciacona in C". International Music Score Library Project.
- Marais, Marin (1686). Pièces de viole, Livre I. Paris: auteur.
- —— (1692). Pièces en trio pour les flutes, violon et dessus de viole. Paris: auteur.
- Matteis, Nicola (2011). Pascubillo, Ron (ed.). "Diverse Bizzarie sopra la Vecchia Sarabanda ò pur Ciaccona". International Music Score Library Project.
- Merula, Tarquinio (1969) [1637]. Canzoni overo sonate concertate. Bologna: Forni.
- Mouton, Charles (2001). Civiol, Richard (ed.). Pièces de luth sur différents modes. Luth-Librairie.
- Muffat, Georg (1690). Apparatus Musico-Organisticus. Vienna: Georg Muffat.
- Muffat, Georg (2008). Barkowski, Michael; Kompy (eds.). "Florilegium Primum". International Music Score Library Project.
- Pezel, Johann Christoph (1686). Opus musicum sonatarum praestantissimarum. Frankfurt: Wust.
- Piccinini, Alessandro (1983a) [1623]. Intavolatura di liuto e di chitarrone, libro primo. Florence: Studio per Edizioni Scelte.
- —— (1983b) [1639]. Intavolatura di liuto, libro secondo. Florence: Studio per Edizioni Scelte.
- Rittler, Philip Jacob (1994). Ruhland, Konrad (ed.). Ciaccona à 7, für zwei Clarini, Violine, 3 Violen, Violone und Cembalo. Ebersberg, Germany: Edition Brand.
- Sances, Giovanni Felice (1633). Cantade a voce sola, libro secondo. Venice: Magni.
- Schmelzer, Johann Heinrich (2012). Tufvesson, Johan (ed.). "Sonatae Unarum Fidium". International Music Score Library Project.
- Schneider, Herbert (1981). Chronologisch-thematisches Verzeichnis sämtlicher Werke von Jean-Baptiste Lully (LWV). Tutzing: Schneider.
- Silberger, Alexander (2010–2014). "FTCO Search Compositions". Frescobaldi Thematic Catalogue Online (FTCO).
- Storace, Bernardo (2014). Gouin, Pierre (ed.). "Ciaccona". International Music Score Library Project.
- Stattkus, Manfred H. (1985). Claudio Monteverdi: Verzeichnis der erhaltenen Werke (SV). Bergkamen: Musikverlag Stattkus.
- Tomlinson, Gary, ed. (1986). Italian Secular Song, 1606–1636: A seven-volume reprint collection. New York: Garland.
- Tsukamoto, Hideo (2002). "Numbering for J.Pachelbel's Works". Pachelbel Street.
- Uccellini, Marco (1642). Sonate, arie, et correnti à 2 e 3, per sonare con diversi instromenti. Venice: Vincenti.
- Vallet, Nicolas (1970). Souris, André; Rollin, Monique (eds.). Le Secret des Muses. Paris: Centre National de la Recherche Scientifique. OCLC 255665595.
- Visée, Robert de (2008). Strizich, Robert (ed.). The Complete Guitar Works. Saint-Nicolas, Québec: Doberman-Yppan.
- Zimmerman, Franklin B. (1963). Henry Purcell, 1659-1695: An analytical catalogue of his music. London: Macmillan.
