= Gaspar Sanz =

Spanish guitarist and composer

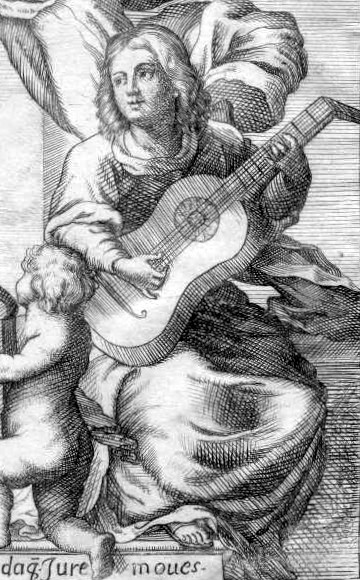
- Gaspar Sanz. A detail from the dedication page of Instrucción de música may be an image of Sanz
- Born: Francisco Bartolomé Sanz Celma baptized April 4, 1640 (birth date unknown); Calanda, Bajo Aragón, Spain
- Died: 1710 (aged 70); Madrid, Spain
- Occupations: composer and priest

Francisco Bartolomé Sanz Celma (April 4, 1640 (baptized) – 1710), better known as Gaspar Sanz, was a Spanish composer, guitarist, and priest born to a wealthy family in Calanda in the comarca of Bajo Aragón, Spain. He studied music, theology and philosophy at the University of Salamanca, where he was later appointed Professor of Music. He wrote three volumes of pedagogical works for the baroque guitar that form an important part of today's classical guitar repertory and have informed modern scholars in the techniques of baroque guitar playing.

== Biography ==
His birth date is unknown but he was baptized as Francisco Bartolomé Sanz Celma in the church of Calanda de Ebro, Aragon on 4 April 1640, later adopting the first name "Gaspar".

After gaining his Bachelor of Theology at the University of Salamanca, Gaspar Sanz traveled to Naples, Rome and perhaps Venice to further his music education. He is thought to have studied under Orazio Benevoli, choirmaster at the Vatican and Cristofaro Caresana, organist at the Royal Chapel of Naples.

Sanz learned to play guitar while studying under Lelio Colista and was influenced by the music of the Italian guitarists Foscarini, Granata, and Corbetta. When Sanz returned to Spain he was appointed instructor of guitar to Don Juan (John of Austria), the only recognized natural-born son of King Philip IV and María Calderón, a noted actress of the day.

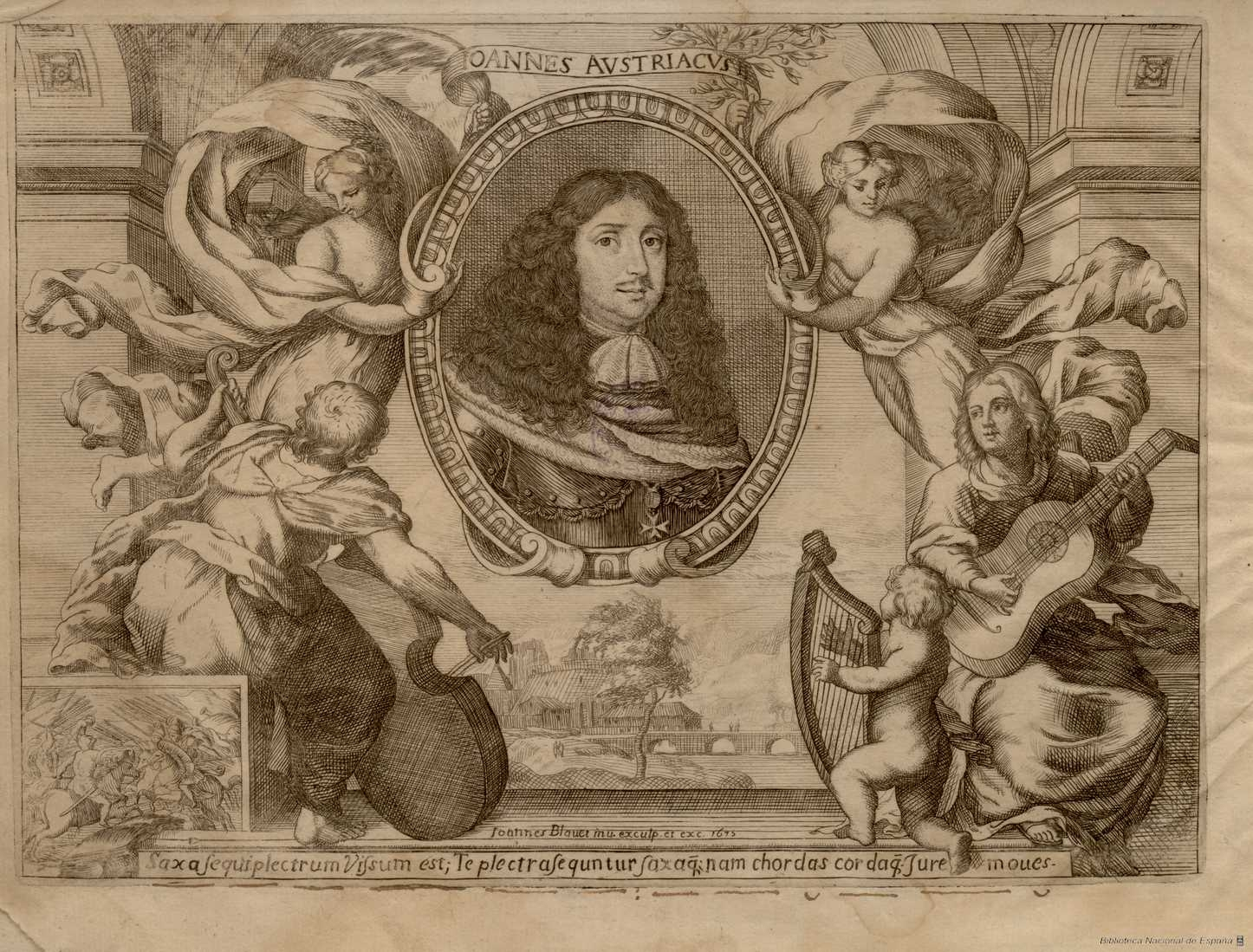
John of Austria as he appears on the dedication page of Instrucción de música sobre la Guitarra Española

In 1674 he wrote his now famous Instrucción de Música sobre la Guitarra Española, published in Saragossa and dedicated to Don Juan. A second book entitled Libro Segundo de cifras sobre la guitarra española was printed in Saragossa in 1675. A third book, Libro tercero de mùsica de cifras sobre la guitarra española, was added to the first and second books, and all three were published together under the title of the first book in 1697, eventually being published in eight editions. The ninety works in this masterpiece are his only known contribution to the repertory of the guitar and include compositions in both punteado ("plucked") style and rasqueado ("strummed") style.

In addition to his musical skills, Gaspar Sanz was noted in his day for his literary works as a poet and writer, and was the author of some poems and two books now largely forgotten. His excellent translation of the celebrated L'huomo di lettere by Jesuit Daniello Bartoli first appeared in 1678, with further editions in 1744 and 1787.

He died in Madrid in 1710.

== Influence ==
His compositions provide some of the most important examples of popular Spanish baroque music for the guitar and now form part of classical guitar pedagogy. Sanz's manuscripts are written as tablature for the baroque guitar and have been transcribed into modern notation by numerous guitarists and editors; Emilio Pujol's edition of Sanz's Canarios being a notable example. Sanz's tablature is remarkable in that it is topologically correct, representing the first string in the lower line and the fifth string in the highest printed line. In this epoch, guitars only had five strings. It also features the "italian alphabet", a shorthand system that assigns a chord to each letter, so that melodic chord progressions can be written and read very neatly (with rhythm information) as a simple sequence of letters, a concept related to the recent Nashville system. For example, there is a "Zarabanda francesa" (french sarabande) which includes the sequence CIFI+H^{2}+G^{2}K^{2}IFCM^{2}N^{2}CAIC, which means:

- CIFI: D major chord, A major, E major, A major
- +H^{2}+G^{2}K^{2}: E minor, B major, E minor, F# major, B minor
- IFCM^{2}N^{2}: A major, E major, A major, E major (variation), A major (variation)
- CAIC: D major, G major, A major, D major

Gaspar Sanz strongly influenced some twentieth-century composers.

- The composer Manuel de Falla utilised some of his themes in his work El retablo de maese Pedro composed in 1923.
- In 1954, at the request of guitarist Andrés Segovia, Joaquín Rodrigo composed his Fantasía para un gentilhombre on themes from Instrucción de música sobre la Guitarra Española.
- Passages of Peter Warlock's Capriol Suite for String Orchestra composed in 1926 appear to be inspired by Sanz's composition Dance De Las Hachas.
- Paco Peña and John Williams have performed works of Sanz together, and performed Sanz's Canarios (1674) in 1975.

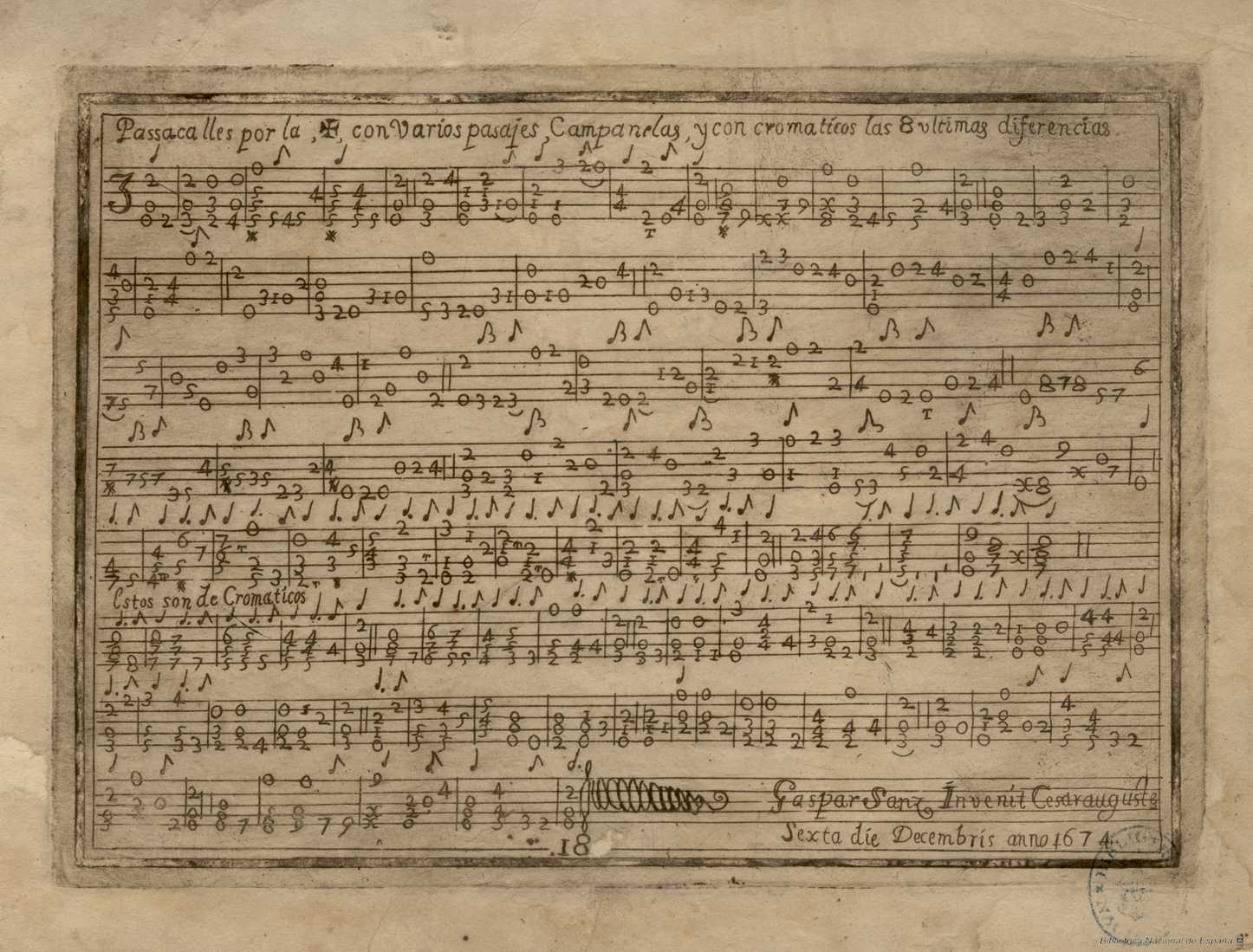
An example of tablature from Instrucción de música sobre la Guitarra Española

== Works ==
=== Volume 1: Instrucción de música sobre la guitarra española (Zaragoza, 1674) ===
- Abecedario italiano;
- GallardaVideo on YouTube;
- Mariona Video on YouTube Video on YouTube;
- Villano
- Danza de las hachas
- Españoleta
- Pavana
- Torneo
- Batalla Video on YouTube;
- Passacalle sobre la D ;
- Jácaras I Video on YouTube;
- Canarios ;
- Preludio y Fantasia;
- Sesquiáltera 1;
- Alemanda, la Serenissima Video on YouTube;
- Giga, al aire inglés Video on YouTube;
- Zarabanda francesa I
- Preludio, o Capricho, arpeado por la cruz ;
- Sesquiáltera 2;
- Alemanda, la Preciosa Video on YouTube;
- Corriente por la Cruz Video on YouTube;
- Zarabanda francesa II;
- Fuga I por primer tono, al ayre español
- El que gustare de falsas ponga cuido en estos cromáticos;
- Fuga II, al ayre de jiga;
- Zarabanda francesa III;
- Passacalles por la E;
- Passacalles por la cruz.

=== Volume 2: Libro segundo, de cifras sobre la guitarra española (Zaragoza, 1675) ===
- Gallardas;
- Las hachas Video on YouTube;
- La Buelta Lavolta;
- FoliasVideo on YouTube;
- Paradetas Video on YouTubeVideo on YouTube
- Matachín
- Zarabanda;
- Jácaras II ;
- ChaconaVideo on YouTube;
- Españoletas
- Pasacalles;
- Canarios II Video on YouTube;
- Canarios III;
- Villanos Video on YouTubeVideo on YouTubeVideo on YouTube;
- Marionas II Video on YouTube;
- Marizápalos Video on YouTube;
- Granduque I;
- Otro Granduque;
- Passacalles;
- Pavanas por la D Video on YouTube;
- Giga Inglesa;
- Bailete Frances;
- Passacalles por la D;
- Clarines y Trompetas con canciones muy curiosas españolas, y de estranjeras naciones: La Cavalleria de Nápoles con dos clarines; Canciones: La Garzona, La Coquina Francesa, Lantururú, La Esfachata de Napoles, La Miñona de Cataluña, La Minina de Portugal, Dos Trompetas de la Reyna de Suecia, Clarín de los Mosqueteros del Rey de Francia.Video on YouTube Video on YouTube;
  - La Cavallería de Nápoles Video on YouTube Video on YouTube;
  - La Garzona;
  - La Coquina Francesa;
  - Lantururú;
  - La Esfacheta de Nápoles;
  - La Miñona de Cataluña Video on YouTube;
  - La Minina de Portugal;
  - Dos trompetas de la reyna de Suecia;
  - Clarín de los mosqueteros del rey de Francia .

=== Volume 3: Libro tercero de musica de cifras sobre la guitarra española (Zaragoza, 1697) ===
- Pasacalles por la C ;
- Prosiguen más diferencias sobre los antecedentes Passacalles;
- Passacalles por la I;
- Passacalles por la E y la D;
- Passacalles por la Cruz y K;
- Passacalles por la H;
- Passacalles por la G y B;
- Passacalles por la D por el Uno bemolado y por segundo Tono;
- Passacalles por la L;
- Passacalles por la K.

== Bibliography ==
- Raymond Burley: Gaspar Sanz - Anthology of Selected Pieces, Schott 1993
- Luis García Abrines: Gaspar Sanz - Instrucción de musica sobre la Guitarra Española, Institución Fernando el Catolico, Zaragoza 1966 (facsimile and commentary)
- Ralf Jarchow: Gaspar Sanz - Instrucción de musica sobre la Guitarra Española, Jarchow, Glinde 2001 (commentary and transcription for guitar; German and English translation of Sanz)
- Ralf Jarchow: Gaspar Sanz und seine Instrucción - Ein fünfteiliger Artikel, Zupfmusik Nr. 2+4, Hamburg 2002, and Concertino Nr. 1, 3+4, Hamburg 2003
- Frank Koonce: Baroque Guitar In Spain And The New World, Mel Bay Publications
- Robert Strizich: The Complete Guitar Works of Gaspar Sanz, Doberman-Yppan, Québec 1999 (commentary and transcription for guitar; English translation of Sanz)
- Robert Strizich: Sanz, Gaspar, The New Grove, New York 2001
- Rodrigo de Zayas: Gaspar Sanz - Transcripcion, Alpuerto, Madrid 1985 (facsimile, commentary and transcription)
- Jerry Willard: The Complete Works of Gaspar Sanz - Volumes 1 and 2, AMSCO Music, 2006, ISBN 9780825616952
