= Francesco Corbetta =

Italian composer

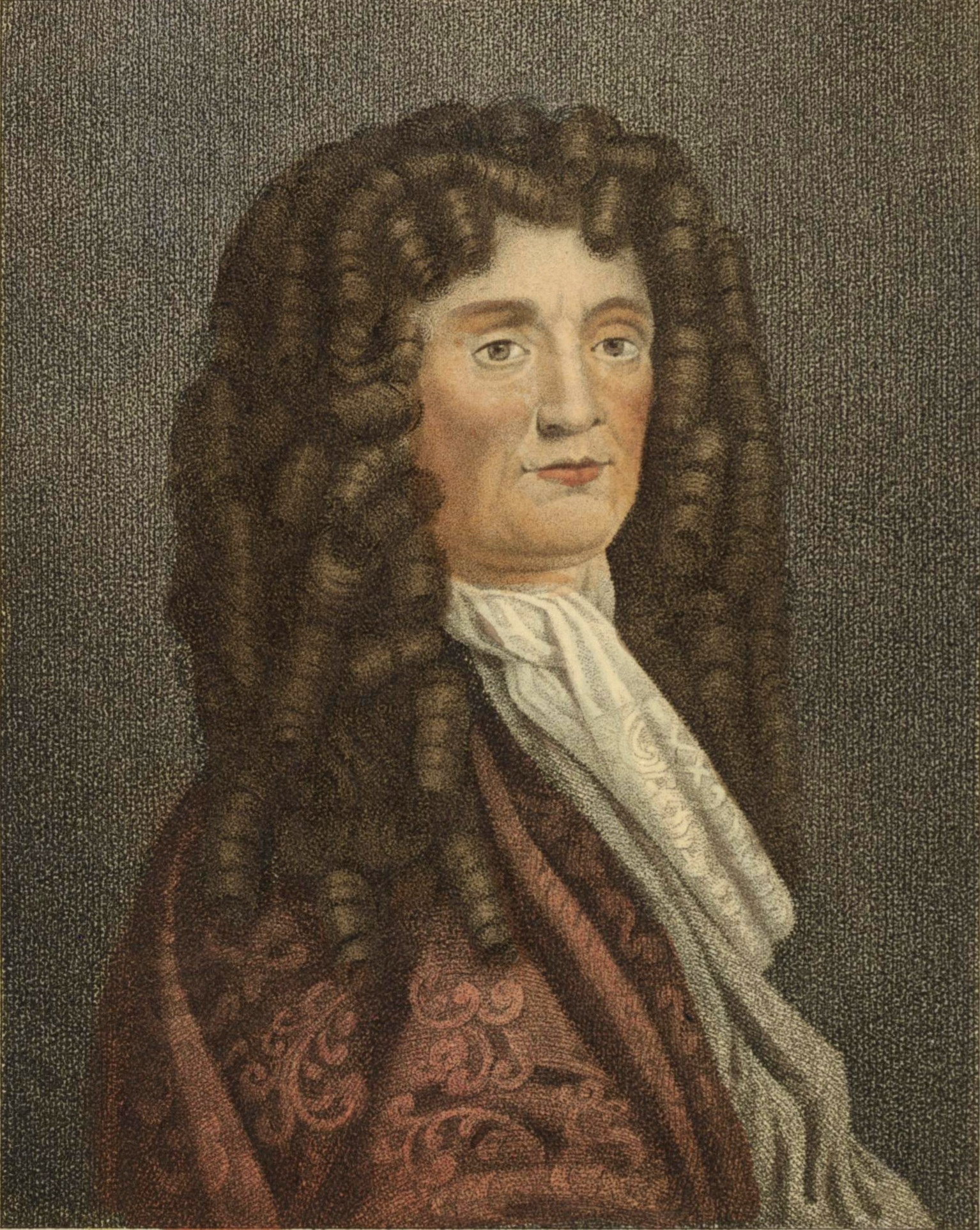
- Francesco Corbetta by van den Berghe colored
- Born: ca. 1615; Pavia, Duchy of Milan
- Died: 1681; Paris, Kingdom of France
- Citizenship: French
- Occupations: composer, teacher,
- Era: Baroque
- Notable work: La Guitarre Royalle

Francesco Corbetta (ca. 1615 – 1681, in French also Francisque Corbette) was an Italian guitar virtuoso, teacher and composer. Along with his compatriots Giovanni Paolo Foscarini and Angelo Michele Bartolotti, he was a pioneer and exponent of the combination of strummed and plucked textures referred to today as "mixed" style.

== Biography ==
=== Early life and education ===
Corbetta's obituary, probably written by his fellow guitarist Rémy Médard, says that he showed a strong inclination for the guitar at an early age, and pursued it over the strong objections of his parents. In the Italian preface to his 1671 La Guitarre Royalle, he claims that he was self-taught on the guitar, and also that he had never played the lute (unlike most celebrated guitarists of his day).

=== Professional career ===
Corbetta spent his early career in Italy. He seems to have worked as a teacher in Bologna, where the guitarist and composer Giovanni Battista Granata was one of his pupils.^{[2]} He was then attached to the Court of Carlo II, Duke of Mantua in various capacities. He was however frequently granted leave of absence and traveled abroad to Spain probably between 1644-1647, where he amazed the Court in Madrid with his virtuosity; to Germany where he was in the employ of the dukes of Hanover and the Spanish Netherlands, dedicating his fourth book, Varii scherzi di sonate to the governor, the Archduke Leopold Wilhelm. According to his obituary, the Duke of Mantua recommended him to Louis XIV; although some sources claim that he taught Louis the guitar this is unlikely as the post is known to have been held by Bernard Jourdan de La Salle from 1650 when Louis was 12 years of age until 1695. Although Corbetta may have visited Paris earlier, he probably did not settle there before 1654. In 1656, he took part in the ballet "La galanterie du temps" by Jean-Baptiste Lully. He came to the attention of the English King Charles II in exile and at the Restoration accompanied him to London. During the last 20 years of his life, he divided his time between London and Paris. He is regarded as one of the greatest virtuosos of the Baroque guitar.

=== Gambling activities ===
While living in England, Corbetta supplemented his income as a musician with his activities as a professional gambler, particularly by operating a game called “L’accia di Catalonia,” which was similar to roulette. He may have exploited his friendship with Charles II to get started in this business; in 1661 the king awarded him a monopoly on the game. A number of other gamblers attempted to infringe on his monopoly, and he eventually ceded his rights to the game to certain of them in return for a share of their profits, but he was later accused of continuing to operate the game without a license. Partly as a result of the ensuing and conflicting claims, Charles revoked almost all licenses for games of chance in 1664.

== Legacy ==
Five collections of his music for the five-course guitar survive today. Corbetta's two earliest books include compositions in the Italian tradition, but his three later publications are increasingly in the French style. At least two others are lost. His first book includes mostly strummed dance music, while his later books are increasingly written in mixed style, culminating in his La Guitarre Royalle of 1671. His last book, also called La Guitarre Royalle, of 1674, returns to a simpler, more strumming-based style. These publications also included important information for continuo playing on the guitar. A substantial amount of music attributed to him also survives in manuscript.

Corbetta's compositional style has been noted for its liberal use of dissonance, which is often not prepared or resolved according to the conventions of seventeenth-century music. This quality was first noted by Richard Pinnell among modern scholars, and has led to a considerable amount of debate. Pinnell and Lex Eisenhardt have suggested, based on internal evidence, that Corbetta's tablatures may present notes that are not meant to be played, as a kind of left-hand fingering aid for the performer. Eisenhardt has also cited Antoine Carré's somewhat simplified versions of Corbetta's pieces in support of this hypothesis. Monica Hall, on the other hand, has argued that Corbetta's dissonances are not unique in Baroque guitar literature, but that his writing shows instead a difference in the degree to which the less formal practices of the early battuto style are incorporated into the more formal notation of the mature mixed style, especially in the 1671 La Guitarre Royalle.

Corbetta was the most significant guitar composer of his day (Gaspar Sanz called him "el mejor de todos," or "the greatest of all") and one of the first to publish in the mixed style. Other guitarists, however, especially Giovanni Paolo Foscarini and Michele Bartolotti, were also influential in establishing and popularizing the mixed style.

Corbetta was also influential as a teacher. As well as Granata, the French guitarist Rémy Médard was probably his student. Another French guitarist, Robert de Visée, composed a Tombeau de Monsieur Francisque that is thought to be an elegy for Corbetta. He may have known Corbetta personally, though there is no evidence he was his student. Corbetta was definitely employed as a guitar teacher to Princess Anne, later Queen Anne of Great Britain. On the other hand, he was probably not employed as a guitar teacher to Louis XIV.

== Publications ==
- Scherzi Armonici (Bologna, 1639)
- Varii Capriccii per la Chitarra Spagnola (Milan, 1643)
- Varii Scherzi di Sonate per la Chitara Spagnola, Libro Quarto (Brussels, 1648)
- [Guitarra española y sus diferencias de sones?] After 1656, Place of publication unknown.
- La Guitarre Royalle, dediée au Roy de la Grande Bretagne (Paris, 1671)
- La Guitarre Royalle (1674)
