= Girolamo Montesardo =

Italian singer and composer

Girolamo Montesardo (fl. 1606 – c. 1620) was an Italian singer and composer.

== Life ==
Although his surname was actually Melcarne, he was referred to by his home town Montesardo, a small town in the Province of Lecce. He worked as a singer at the San Petronio Basilica in Bologna, as a maestro di cappella at Fano and at Ancona. His earliest extant work was published in Florence in 1606.

His guitar book Nuova inventione d'intavolatura per sonare li balletti sopra la Chitarra Spagniuola is the earliest to have been printed using alphabet notation of chords for rasgueado playing a five-course guitar. This had been in use in Italy and possibly Spain for some time before 1606. Montesardo does not claim to have invented this form of notation. His 'Nuova inventione' refers to his system for indicating the metre and note values with which the music is played. This involves using upper case and lower case letters to represent the minim and the crotchet respectively. A dot after the letter has the same function as it does in modern staff notation; it increases the value of the note by half its original value. This style of music printed in alfabeto became very popular in Italy during the 17th century. Nuova inventione includes versions of some of the most popular dance-songs and harmonic patterns of the time, including the Ruggiero, bergamasca, folia, and Ballo del gran duca, and was the first Italian publication to include the ciaccone and passacaglias.

In terms of original music, Montesardo mainly composed polyphonic sacred music and madrigals. Montesardo also experimented with monody and published a collection of monody, which included his own experiments and works by Jacopo Peri and Giulio Caccini.

He may be the same person as Gervasio Melcarne (Geruasio), two of whose madrigals appear in Pomponio Nenna's eighth book of madrigals for five voices (1618) alongside madrigals by Nenna and Carlo Gesualdo.

== Bibliography ==
- Thomas Walker and Tim Carter: "Girolamo Montesardo", in Grove Music Online, ed. L. Macy (accessed 27 January 2007), grovemusic.com (subscription access).
