= Chaconne =

Type of musical composition

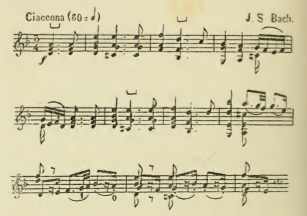
The "Ciaccona" from Johann Sebastian Bach's Partita for Violin No. 2

A chaconne (/ʃəˈkɒn/ shə-KON, French: [ʃakɔn]; Spanish: chacona [tʃaˈkona]; Italian: ciaccona [tʃakˈkoːna]; earlier English: chacony) is a type of musical composition frequently used as a vehicle for variation on a repeated brief harmonic progression, often involving a fairly short repetitive bass-line (ground bass) which offers a compositional outline for variation, decoration, figuration and melodic invention. In this respect, it closely resembles the passacaglia. It originated in the Baroque era, when it was particularly popular; a large number of Chaconnes from the 17th and 18th centuries are in existence.

The ground bass, if there is one, may typically descend gradually from the tonic to the dominant pitch of the scale; the harmonies given to the upper parts may emphasise the circle of fifths or a derivative pattern thereof.

== History ==
Although it originally emerged in Spanish culture during the late 16th century, having reputedly been introduced from the New World, as a fast dance-song characterised by suggestive movements and mocking texts,, the chaconne had evolved into a slow triple metre instrumental form by the early eighteenth century.

Alex Ross describes the origins of the chacona as actually having been a sexily swirling dance that appeared in South America at the end of the sixteenth century and rapidly spread to Europe. The dance became popular in the elite courts as well as among the general population. "Un sarao de la chacona" is one of the earliest-known examples of a "chacona", written down by Spanish musician Juan Arañés.

Monteverdi's "Zefiro torna" and "Es steh Gott auf" by Heinrich Schütz are prime examples of early baroque chaconnes.

One of the best-known and most masterful and expressive examples of the chaconne is the final movement from the Violin Partita in D minor by Johann Sebastian Bach. This 256-measure chaconne takes a plaintive four-bar phrase through a continuous kaleidoscope of musical expression in both major and minor modes. However, recently it has been proposed that Bach's "Ciaccona" (he used the Italian form of the name, rather than the French "Chaconne") is actually cast in the form of a French theatrical dance known as the "passacaille", although it also incorporates Italian and German-style features.

After the Baroque period, the chaconne fell into decline during the 19th century, although Beethoven's 32 Variations in C minor suggest its continuing influence. However, the form enjoyed a very substantial revival during the 20th century, with more than two dozen composers contributing examples (see below).

== Chaconne and passacaglia ==
The chaconne has been understood by some nineteenth and early twentieth-century theorists to be a set of variations on a harmonic progression, as opposed to a set of variations on a melodic bass pattern (to which is assigned the term passacaglia), whereas other theorists of the same period make the distinction the other way around. In actual usage in music history, the term "chaconne" has not been so clearly distinguished from "passacaglia" as regards the way in which the relevant piece of music is constructed, and "modern attempts to arrive at a clear distinction are arbitrary and historically unfounded." In fact, the two genres were sometimes combined in a single composition, as in the Cento partite sopra passacagli, from Toccate d’intavolatura di cimbalo et organo, partite di diverse arie ... (1637), by Girolamo Frescobaldi, and the first suite of Les Nations (1726) as well as in the Pièces de Violes (1728) by François Couperin.

Frescobaldi, who was probably the first composer to treat the chaconne and passacaglia comparatively, usually (but not invariably) sets the former in major key, with two compound triple-beat groups per variation, giving his chaconne a more propulsive forward motion than his passacaglia, which usually has four simple triple-beat groups per variation. Both are usually in triple metre, commence on the second beat of the bar, and have a theme of four measures (or a close multiple thereof). (In more recent times the chaconne, like the passacaglia, need not be in 3/4 time; see, for instance, Francesco Tristano Schlimé's Chaconne/Ground Bass, where every section is built on seven-beats patterns)

== Examples ==
=== 17th century ===
- Antonio Bertali (1605–1669): Ciaccona in C major for violin and continuo (undated)
- Heinrich Ignaz Franz Biber (1644–1704): Ciacona in D major for violin and basso continuo (undated); another in the Partita no. 3 in A major for seven string instruments, from Harmonia artificioso-ariosa (written 1696)
- Dieterich Buxtehude (c. 1638–1707): Prelude, fugue, and chaconne in C Major (BuxWV 137), chaconne in C minor (BuxWV 159), and chaconne in E minor (BuxWV 160); all for organ (probably 1690s)
- Francesca Caccini (1587 – c.1641): Ciaccona
- Maurizio Cazzati (1616–1678): Ciaccona a tre con il suo balletto for two violins and violone, from Correnti, balletti, galiarde a 3 è 4 (1659)
- Marc-Antoine Charpentier (1643–1704): Chaconne from the opera Les arts florissants (1685); another from the opera David et Jonathas (1688); another from the opera Médée (1694)
- Arcangelo Corelli (1653–1713): Chaconne in G major in the Sonata op. 2, no. 12, from the Sonate da camera a tre: doi violini, e violone o cembalo (1685)
- Girolamo Frescobaldi (1583–1643): Four ciaccone (in F major, A minor, G major, A minor again) for harpsichord from Toccate d’intavolatura di cimbalo et organo, partite di diverse arie . . . (1637)
- Jean-Nicolas Geoffroy (1633–1694): Eighteen chaconnes for harpsichord, all unpublished in the composer's lifetime, perhaps the most chaconnes written by any known 17th-, 18th-, or 19th-century composer
- Jean-Baptiste Lully (1632–1687): Chaconne from the opera Phaëton (1683); another from the opera Roland (1685); another from the opera Acis et Galatée (1686)
- Marin Marais (1656–1728): Chaconne in G major for two violas da gamba and continuo, no. 47 from the Pièces de violes, premier livre (1686–89)
- Tarquinio Merula (1594/95–1665): "Su la cetra amorosa," aria in ciaccona for soprano and instrumental accompaniment, from Madrigali et altre musiche concertate (1633)
- Girolamo Montesardo (dates unknown): Chaconne bass line in three keys (G major, C major, F major) for guitar, from Nuova inventione d'intavolatura (1606), perhaps the first written chaconne
- Claudio Monteverdi (1567–1643): "Zefiro torna," ciaccona for two tenors and instrumental accompaniment, from Scherzi musicali cioè arie et madrigali (1632)
- Johann Pachelbel (1653–1706): Two chaconnes (in C major, D major) for organ, from Hexachordum Apollinis (1699); four more (in D major, D minor, F major, F minor) for organ (undated)
- Henry Purcell (1659–1695): Chaconne from the semi-opera Prophetess, or The History of Dioclesian (1690); two more from the semi-opera King Arthur, or The British Worthy (1691); another from the semi-opera The Fairy-Queen (1692)
- Robert de Visée (1655–1732/33): Two chaconnes (in F major, G major) for guitar from Livre de guittarre, dédié au roi (1682); another in G minor, from Livre de pieces pour la guittarre, dédié au roi (1686)

=== 18th century ===
- Johann Sebastian Bach (1685–1750): Chaconne, fifth movement of Partita no. 2 in D minor for solo violin (1720)
- Luigi Boccherini (1743–1805): "Chaconne that represents Hell . . . in imitation of the one by M. Gluck," finale to Symphony in D minor, op. 12, no. 4 (1771)
- Joseph Bodin de Boismortier (1689–1755): Chaconne in A major for two cellos, from Neuf petites sonates et chaconne (1737); another in G major, from the opera Daphnis et Chloé (1747)
- François Couperin (1668–1733): "La Favorite," chaconne, ninth movement in Ordre 3ème in C minor for harpsichord, from Pièces de clavecin, premier livre (1713)
- Antoine Forqueray (1671–1745): Chaconne "La Buisson", from Pieces de viole avec basse continue (1747)
- Christoph Willibald Gluck (1714–1787): Chaconne in the opera Orfeo ed Euridice (1762); the same chaconne also in the opera Iphigénie en Aulide (1774); a different chaconne in the opera Armide (1777)
- George Frideric Handel (1685–1759): Chaconne in G major and 21 variations for harpsichord (written 1705–17, published 1733); another in G major and 62 variations for organ (written 1703–06, published 1733)
- Marin Marais (1656–1728): Chaconne, eighth movement in Suite 3 in F major; another, final movement in Suite in A major; both for viola da gamba and continuo, from Pièces de viole, quatrième livre (1717)
- Jean-Philippe Rameau (1683–1764): chaconne in D minor from the opera-ballet Les Indes galantes (1735); another in D minor from the opera-ballet Les fêtes d'Hébé (1739); another in A major from the comic opera Platée (1745)
- Georg Philipp Telemann (1681–1767): "Lilliputian Chaconne," second movement of "Gulliver's Travels," Intrada-Suite in D major for 2 violins, from Der getreue Musikmeister (1728–29)
- Tomaso Antonio Vitali (1663–1745): Chaconne in G minor for violin and piano (c. 1710–1730)
- Antonio Vivaldi (1678–1741): Ciaccona, third movement of Concerto in G minor for flute, oboe, violin, bassoon, strings (c. 1720)
- Sylvius Leopold Weiss (1687–1750): Chaconne, eleventh movement in Sonata 1; another, ninth movement in Sonata 2; another, seventh movement in Sonata 10; another, seventh movement in Sonata 12; all for lute (all undated)

=== 19th century ===
- Johannes Brahms: Symphony No. 4 in E minor, Op. 98, finale
- Franz Liszt: Chaconne from Sarabande und Chaconne aus dem Singspiel Almira, S.181 (1879)
- Heinrich Reimann: Ciacona in F minor, op. 32, for organ

=== 20th century ===
- John Adams: second movement "Chaconne: Body Through Which the Dream Flows" from Violin Concerto (1993)
- Malcolm Arnold: second movement "Chaconne" from Recorder Sonatina, Op. 41 (1953)
- Malcolm Arnold: second movement "Chaconne: Andante con moto" from Quintet For Brass, Op. 73 (1961)
- Béla Bartók: first movement, "Tempo di ciaccona" from the Sonata for violin solo (1944)
- Howard Blake: Chaconne (from Lifecycle, sequence of 24 piano solos) (1975)
- Benjamin Britten: "Chacony," third movement of the String Quartet No. 2, in C (1945)
- Benjamin Britten: "Ciaccona," fifth movement of the Cello Suite No. 2 (1967)
- Ferruccio Busoni: "Ciaccona", third section of Toccata: Preludio, Fantasia, Ciaccona, BV 287 (1922)
- Mario Castelnuovo-Tedesco: "El Sueño de la Razón Produce Monstruos", from "24 Caprichos de Goya", Op. 195
- John Corigliano: The Red Violin (Chaconne) for violin and orchestra
- John Corigliano: Chaconne, 3rd movement of Symphony No. 1 "Giulio's Song" (1990)
- Johann Nepomuk David: Chaconne in A minor for organ (1933)
- Johann Nepomuk David: Nun komm, der Heiden Heiland: kleine Chaconne on "Nun komm, der Heiden Heiland" for organ
- Robert Davidson: Chaconne for orchestra (1994)
- Norman Dello Joio: Variations, Chaconne, and Finale for orchestra
- David Diamond: Chaconne, for violin and piano (1951)
- Cornelis Dopper: Ciaconna gotica (1920)
- Marcel Dupré: Triptyque, op. 51 (Chaconne, Musette, Dithyrambe), for organ
- Jean Françaix: Chaconne for harp and string orchestra (1976)
- Gunnar de Frumerie: Chaconne op. 8, for piano (1932)
- Philip Glass: Echorus for two violins and string orchestra (1995)
- Philip Glass: Symphony No. 3, third movement (1995)
- Philip Glass: Violin Concerto No. 1, second movement (1987)
- Alexander Goehr: Chaconne, for organ (1985)
- Sofia Gubaidulina: Chaconne, for piano (1962)
- Lou Harrison: Suite for Violin and American Gamelan (1974)
- Hans Werner Henze: Il Vitalino raddoppiato: ciaccona per violino soloista e orchestra da camera (1977)
- Hans Werner Henze: Concerto for Double Bass, third movement (1966)
- Heinz Holliger: Chaconne for solo cello (1975)
- Gustav Holst: "Chaconne" from First Suite in E-flat major for Military Band (according to one writer, technically a passacaglia, but according to others, technically a chaconne)
- Arthur Honegger: Chaconne de l'impératrice, from the film music for Napoléon (1926–27)
- Ernst Krenek: Toccata und Chaconne: über den Choral "Ja ich glaub an Jesum Christum", op. 13, for piano
- György Ligeti: Hungarian Rock: Chaconne, for harpsichord
- Douglas Lilburn: Chaconne, for Piano (1946)
- Frank Martin: Chaconne, for cello and piano (1931)
- Carl Nielsen: Chaconne, op. 32, for piano (1916–17)
- Henri Pousseur: Chaconne for solo violin
- Knudåge Riisager: Chaconne, op. 50, for orchestra
- Poul Ruders: Chaconne for solo guitar
- Franz Schmidt: Chaconne in C♯ minor, for organ. (1925) Arranged for orchestra (transposed to D minor) in 1931.
- Reginald Smith Brindle: Chaconne and Interludes: (The Instruments of Peace III), for two guitars
- Leo Sowerby: Chaconne, for tuba and piano (1938)
- Leo Sowerby: Canon, Chacony, & Fugue for organ (1948)
- David Van Vactor: Fantasia, Chaconne, and Allegro, for orchestra
- Stefan Wolpe: Dance in Form of a Chaconne for piano (1941)
- Michiru Yamane: Chaconne in C-moll for organ (1996)
- Bernd Alois Zimmermann: opera Die Soldaten (1965). Act 1, Scene 2 (Ciacona 1). Act 2, Scene 2 (Capriccio, Corale e Ciacona II). Act 4, Scene 2 (Ciacona III)

=== 21st century ===
- Paulo Galvão: Chacoinas (2) in A minor for baroque guitar.
- Jennifer Higdon: "Chaconni," second movement from her violin concerto (2008)
- Krzysztof Penderecki: Ciaccona in memoria Giovanni Paolo II per archi (for string orchestra) from Polish Requiem (added in 2005).
- Francesco Tristano Schlimé: Chaconne/Ground Bass for piano (1997/2004/2012).
- Roman Turovsky: Chaconnes in C major, C minor and D minor for baroque lute.
- Simon Andrews: Chaconne, 2nd movement of Symphony No. 1 "For the heart is an organ of fire" (2013)
- Marc-André Dalbavie: Ciaccona for orchestra (2002).
- Paulo Ugoletti: Ciaccona per pianoforte.
- Michael Blake: French Suite for piano, first dance (1994).
- Michael Blake: Kora for harp (2009).
- While formally not a chaconne, the Enhypen song Chaconne (2023) is inspired by the history of the form.
