= Nicolas Vallet =

French composer

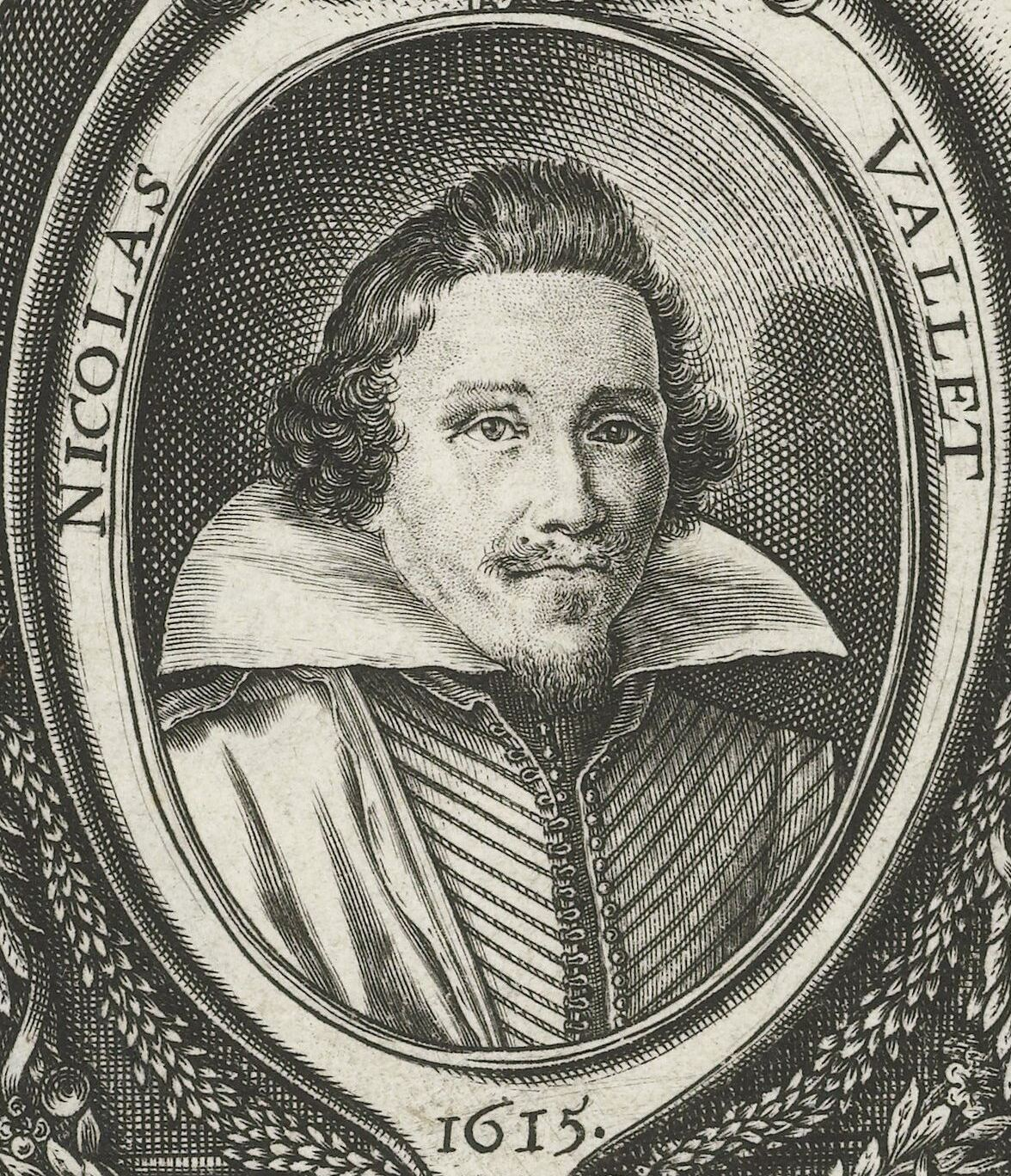
Portrait of Nicolas Vallet, 1615

Nicolas Vallet (also Valet; c. 1583 – c. 1642) was a French lutenist and composer who emigrated to the Dutch Republic.

Vallet, a Huguenot, was born at Corbeny, Aisne, but fled around 1613 from France to the Netherlands for unknown reasons. In Amsterdam he worked as a self-supporting musician, lute teacher, and as the owner of a dance school.

His primary work, Le Secret des Muses, contains compositions and instruction for the 10-course Renaissance lute. It was published in two parts in 1615 and 1616. It was among the last compositions to appear for this instrument, before it was supplanted by the Baroque lute.

He also wrote a Psalms of David (in 1615) and Regia Pietas (in 1622).

According to Frederick Neumann, Vallet may have been among the first to introduce ornaments to the lute tablature.
