= Juan Arañés =

Spanish composer

Juan Arañés (died c. 1649) was a Spanish baroque composer. His tonos and villancicos follow the style of those preserved in the Cancionero of Kraków.

== Biography ==
Arañés was born in Aragon, at an unknown date. After studies in Alcalá de Henares, he was maestro di cappella at the Spanish embassy in Rome, where in 1624 he published his Libro Segundo de tonos y villancicos. The first book is lost. The Libro Segundo collection contains 12 pieces of 1, 2, and 3 voices, tonos humanos and villancicos, the final being a vocal chaconne for 4 voices, A la vida bona which features in the works of Miguel de Cervantes. (Note: For example, in La nouela de la Fregona from Novelas exemplares: "El bayle de la chacona Encierra la vida bona.") The collection is notable for its guitar accompaniment in Italian notation. He died in or after 1649.

== Works, editions and recordings ==
- A la vida bona for 4 voices - on (i) Musica en el Quijote y otras obras de Miguel de Cervantes, Orphénica Lyra (Glossa, 2005) and (ii) Miguel de Cervantes, Don Quijote de la Mancha: Romances y Músicas dir. Jordi Savall, Hesperion XXI, (Alia Vox, 2006).

Nuevo Sarao performed his works at the Festival de Música Antiga dels Pirineus in 2011 and recorded his complete works.
