= Robert de Visée =

French guitarist, theorbist, singer and composer

Robert de Visée (1652-1730) was a French lutenist, guitarist, theorbist and viol player at the court of the kings Louis XIV and Louis XV, as well as a singer and a composer for lute, theorbo and guitar.

== Biography ==
Robert de Visée was born in 1652 in La Flèche, France. He probably knew Francesco Corbetta, and would have been familiar with his music. François-Joseph Fétis wrote that he studied with Corbetta; this information has been repeated uncritically in later sources, including Strizich and Ledbetter in 2001. It is, however, unsupported by documentary evidence. De Visée is first mentioned (by Le Gallois) in 1680, and at about that time he became a chamber musician to Louis XIV, in which capacity he often performed at court. In 1709, he was appointed as a singer of the royal chamber, and in 1719 was named 'Guitar Master of the King' (Maître de Guitare du Roi) to Louis XV, the ten-year-old great-grandson of Louis XIV, who succeeded to the throne in 1715. Jean Rousseau reported in a letter of 1688 that Visée was a respected musician at Versailles and played the viol. He died in Paris on February 15, 1730, leaving his son François de Visée as his sole heir.

== Works ==
Visée published two books of guitar music that contain twelve suites between them, as well as a few separate pieces: Livre de guitare dédié au roi (Paris, 1682) and Livre de pièces pour la guitare (Paris, 1686). He also published a collection of pieces for the theorbo and lute: Pièces de théorbe et de luth (Paris, 1716); these are in staff notation rather than tablature and may also be performed as ensemble pieces. The contents of all three books are tabulated with incipits and concordances in Rebours 2000. He composed many other pieces for theorbo and Baroque lute (the bulk of which are preserved in the Saizenay Ms.).

Complete list of de Visée's pieces for the guitar:

- 1682 Livre de Guitarre, dédie au roi:
  - Suite No. 1 in A Minor: Prélude – Allemande – Courante – Sarabande – Gigue – Passacaille – Gavotte – Gavotte – Bourrée
  - Suite No. 2 in A Major: Allemande – Courante – Sarabande
  - Suite No. 3 in D Minor: Prélude – Allemande – Courante – Courante – Sarabande – Sarabande – Gigue – Passacaille – Gavotte – Gavotte – Menuet Rondeau – Menuet Rondeau – Bourrée
  - Suite No. 4 in G Minor: Prélude – Allemande – Courante – Double de la Courante – Sarabande – Gigue – Menuet – Gavotte
  - Suite No. 5 in G Major: Sarabande – Sarabande – Gigue
  - Suite No. 6 in C Minor: Prélude – Tombeau de Mr. Francisque Corbet – Courante – Sarabande – Sarabande en Rondeau – Gavotte
  - Suite No. 7 in C Major: Prélude – Allemande – Courante – Sarabande – Gigue, a la Maniere Angloise – Gavotte – Menuet
  - Chaconne (F Major)
  - Suite No. 8 in G Major: Prélude – (Accord Nouveau) – Allemande – Courante – Sarabande – Gigue – Sarabande – Chaconne – Gavotte – Menuet – Bourrée
- 1686 Livre de Pieces pour la Guitarre:
  - Suite No. 9 in D Minor: Prélude – Allemande – Courante – Sarabande – Gigue – Gavotte – Bourrée – Menuet – Passacaille – Menuet
  - Suite No. 10 in G Minor: Prélude – Allemande – Courante – Sarabande – Gigue – Menuet – Chaconne – Gavotte – Bourrée – Menuet
  - Sarabande (A Minor)
  - Gigue (A Minor)
  - Sarabande (A Major)
  - Menuet (A Major)
  - Suite No. 11 in B Minor: Prélude – Allemande – Sarabande – Gigue – Passacaille
  - Suite No. 12 in E Minor: Sarabande – Menuet – Passacaille
  - Menuet (C Major)
- Manuscript Pieces:
  - Pieces in A minor
    - Prélude
    - Allemande
    - Villanelle (& Contrepartie)
  - Pieces in A major
    - Prélude
    - Rondeau
  - Pieces in C major
    - Courante
    - Gigue
  - Pieces in D minor
    - Allemande 'La Royalle'
    - Sarabande
    - Masquerade
    - Gigue
    - Gavotte
    - Chaconne
  - Pieces in D major
    - Sarabande
    - Gavotte
    - Chaconne
    - Gavotte Rondeau (& Contrepartie)
  - Pieces in G minor
    - Prélude
    - Prélude
    - Allemande
    - Sarabande
    - Gavotte
    - Gavotte en Rondeau
    - Ouverture de la Grotte De Versaille (de Lully)
    - Entrée d’Appollon (de Lully)
  - Pieces in G major
    - Allemande
    - Courante
    - Sarabande
    - Gigue
    - Gigue
    - Musette (Rondeau)

List of de Visée's pieces for lute and theorbo:

- 1716 Pièces de Théorbe et de Luth. Mises in Partition, Dessus et Basse:
  - Suite No. 1 in G Minor: Allemande (grave) – Allemande (gay) – Allemande (grave) – Courante – Courante – Courante – Sarabande – Sarabande – Sarabande – Gigue – Gigue (gaye) – Gavotte – Gavotte – Passacaille – Pastorale – Menuet
  - Suite No. 2 in G Major: Allemande – Courante – Sarabande – Gigue – Menuet – Chacone
  - Suite No. 3 in A Minor: Prélude – Allemande (grave) – Allemande (grave) – Allemande (grave) – Courante – Sarabande – Sarabande – Gigue – Gigue – Gavotte – La Montfermeil (Rondeau)
  - Suite No. 4 in B♭ Major: Allemande (la Mutine, gay) – Courante – Sarabande (la Du haut menil) – Gigue (grave) – Gavotte
  - Suite No. 5 in C Minor: Prélude – Allemande (Tombeau de Du But, grave) – Allemande (grave) – Allemande (grave) – Allemande (La Conversation, grave) – Courante – Courante – Sarabande (Rondeau) – Sarabande – Gigue – Gigue (gaye) – Gavotte – Gavotte (Rondeau) – Gavotte
  - Suite No. 6 in C Major: Allemande – Courante – Courante – Gigue – Gigue – Muzette (Rondeau) – Gavotte (Rondeau) – Menuet (Rondeau)
  - Suite No. 7 in D Minor: Allemande (la Royale) – Courante – Courante – Sarabande – Gavotte – Chacone – Mascarade (Rondeau)
  - Suite No. 8 in D Major: Allemande – Courante – Courante – Sarabande – Gigue – Gigue – Gavotte – Bourée (la Villageoise)
  - Suite No. 9 in E Minor: Allemande (Tombeau de M. Mouton, grave) – Allemande – Courante – Sarabande – Gigue – Gavotte
  - Suite No. 10 in F Minor: Allemande (Tombeau de Mlles de Visée, filles de l'auteur "la Plainte", grave) – Courante – Sarabande – Gigue – Gigue

== Sources ==
- Charnassé, Hélène, Rafael Andia, and Gérard Rebours. 2001. The Guitar Books of Robert de Visée. Paris: Editions Musicales Transatlantiques.
- Demeilliez, Marie, Michel, Frédéric, Roussel, Thibaut. "Documents inédits pour une biographie de Robert de Visée", Le Joueur de luth : Bulletin de la Société Française de luth, 2025, pp.11-25 .
- Fétis, François-Joseph. 1865. Bibliographie universelle des musiciens, second edition. Paris: Firmin-Didot.
- Rebours, Gérard Rebours. 2000. Robert de Visée: Thematic Index with a Table of Concordances. Lyon: Symétrie.
- Rebours, Gérard. 2005. "The Baroque Guitar in France and Its Two Main Figures: Robert de Visée and François Campion”. Michaelsteiner Konferenzberichte 66:195–210.
- Strizich, Robert, and David Ledbetter. 2001. "Visée, Robert de". The New Grove Dictionary of Music and Musicians, second edition, edited by Stanley Sadie and John Tyrrell. London: Macmillan Publishers.
