= Angelo Michele Bartolotti =

Italian composer

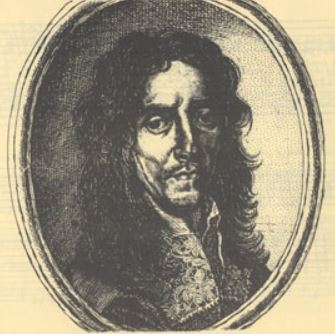
Bartolotti (1655)

Angelo Michele Bartolotti (died before 1682) was an Italian guitarist, theorbo player and composer. Bartolotti was probably born in Bologna, Italy, as he describes himself as "Bolognese" on the title page of his first guitar book and "di Bologna" on the title page of his second.

== Career ==
Bartolotti's early career was probably spent in Florence, possibly in the service of Jacopo Salviati, Duke of Giuliano. He was amongst a group of Italian musicians invited to the Court of Queen Christina of Sweden in the early 1650s. There are records of his employment there in 1652 and 1654. On her abdication in 1655, Christina lived in Rome and Bartolotti was probably employed in her service there. In 1658, she travelled to Paris, and it is possible that Bartolotti accompanied her. He seems to have settled there and lived there until his death sometime before 1682.

== Works ==
During his years in Italy, Bartolotti published at least two collections of guitar music: Libro primo di chitarra spagnola (Florence, 1640) and Secondo libro di chitarra (Rome, ca. 1655). The first book contains a cycle of passacaglias in all major and minor keys, employing a combination of battute and pizzicato styles, influenced by earlier Italian guitarists such as Giovanni Paolo Foscarini; the book also includes a ciaccona, a follia and six suites each comprising an Allemanda, Corente and Sarabanda. The second book is French-influenced, with more emphasis on pizzicato writing. Three more pieces are attributed to him in manuscripts.

Bartolotti's oeuvre comprises some of the most carefully notated (with precise indications for various playing styles, ornaments, etc.) and advanced guitar music of the period. In France, however, he was best known as a theorbo player, praised by Constantijn Huygens and René Ouvrard. His treatise on theorbo accompaniment (Table pour apprendre facilement à toucher le théorbe sur la basse-continuë (Paris, 1669) is among the best 17th-century sources on the subject.
