= Nicola Matteis =

Italian composer (c. 1650 – after 1713)

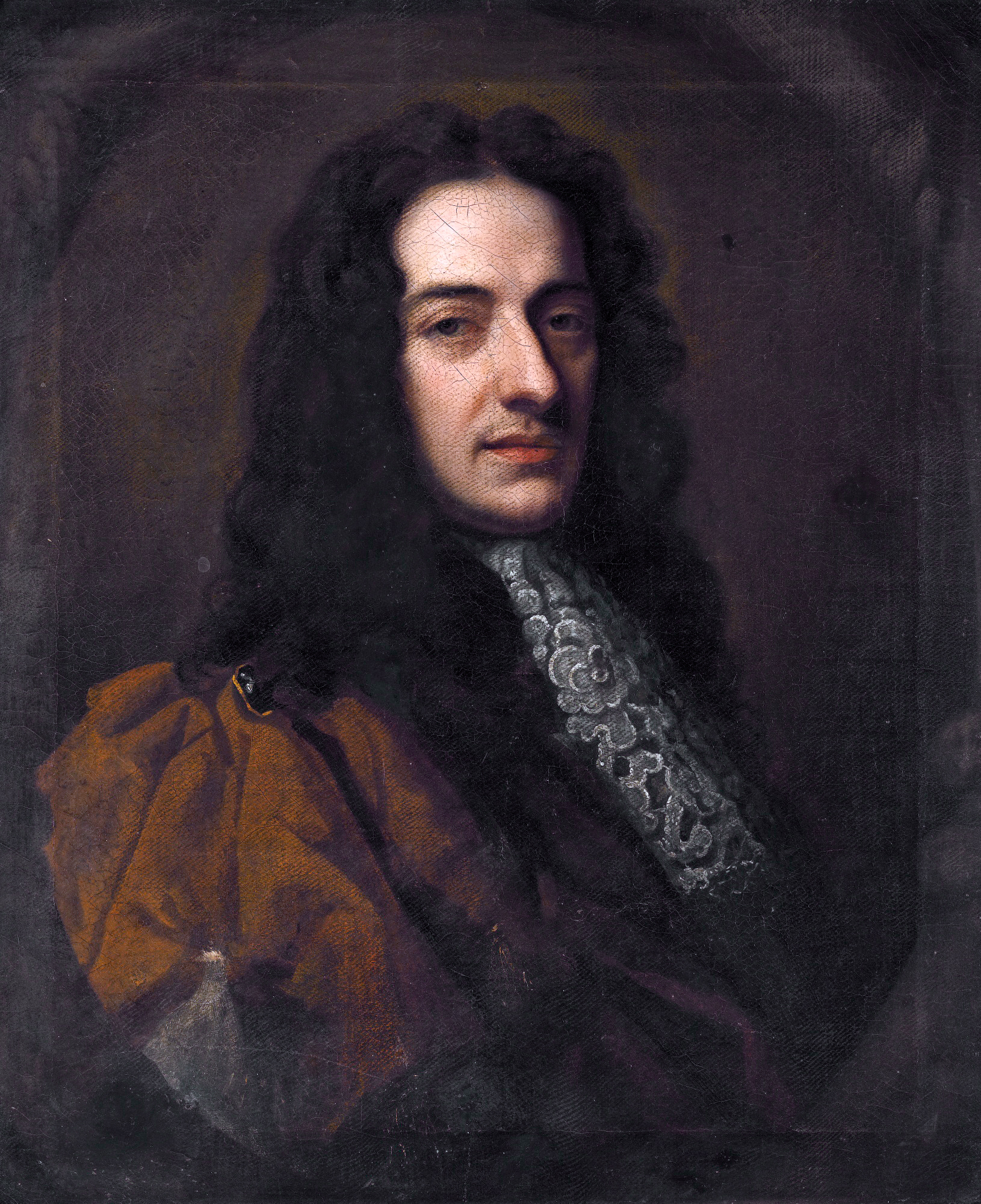
Nicola Matteis (Godfrey Kneller, 1682)

Nicola Matteis (Matheis) (c. 1650 – after 1713) was the earliest notable Italian Baroque violinist in London, whom Roger North judged in retrospect "to have been a second to Corelli," and a composer of significant popularity in his time, though he had been utterly forgotten until the later 20th century.

Very little is known of his early life, although Matteis was probably born in Naples, describing himself as 'Napolitano' in several of his works. He came to London in the early 1670s and according to the diarist Roger North, had a city merchant as a sponsor, who schooled him in the ways of currying favor from the gentry (by allowing them to accompany him in parlor recitals and other minor performances). John Evelyn reports in his diary for 19 November 1674, the earliest notice of Matteis, "I heard that stupendious Violin Signor Nichola (with other rare Musitians) whom certainly never mortal man exceeded on that instrument, he had a stroak so sweete, made it speaking like the Voice of a man and when he pleased, like a Consort of severall Instruments: he did wonders upon a Note: was an excellent Composer also. Nothing approched the violin in Nichola's hand: he seemed to be inspired and played such ravishing things on a ground as astonishd us all."

Matteis enjoyed great artistic and commercial success with his published music, notably four books of Ayres (1676, 1685). According to North he nevertheless ended his days diseased and in poverty.

Matteis is credited with changing the English taste for violin playing from the French style to a newer, Italian one. Contemporaries described him as using a longer bow, with a new bow hold (closer to that used by modern players). His reputation grew through his lifetime and resulted in high praise for his performances (in concert, audiences were often certain that more than one violin was being played) and widespread popularity for his music. Knowing many of his customers were amateurs, Matteis tended to give precise instructions in the prefaces to his published Ayres, providing detailed notes on bowing, explanations of ornaments, tempos, and other directions. These notes have proved valuable resources for scholars reconstructing the performance practices of the time.

His son, Nicola was likewise a good violinist, and lived for a long time in Vienna, but later resided in Shrewsbury as a violin and language teacher, and had Charles Burney among his students. He died in 1737, near Vienna.

== Notable works ==
- Ayrs For the Violin / Preludes, Allmands, Sarabands, Courantes, Gigues, Divisions, and Double Compositions fitted to all hands and capacities, by Nicola Matteis / The first Part (1676)
- Other Ayrs, Preludes, Allmands, Sarabands... with full stops for the Violin, by Nicola Matteis / The Second Part (1676)
- Ayres for the Violin to Wit... The Third and Fourth Parts / composed by Nicola Matteis (1685) / NOTE: It actually contains only the Third Part.
- Other Ayres and Pieces For the Violin Bass Viol and Harpsichord somewhat more Difficult and Artificial then (sic) the former: Composed for the Practice and Service of greater Masters upon those Instruments By Nicola Matteis / The Fourth Part (1685).
- A guide to playing the basso continuo on the guitar (“The false consonances of musick”).

== Sources ==
- Haynes, Bruce. The End of Early Music: A Period Performer's History of Music for the Twenty-First Century (2007) Oxford University Press. ISBN 0-19-518987-6.
- Bukofzer, Manfred F. Music In The Baroque Era - From Monteverdi To Bach (2007) Von Elterlein Press. ISBN 1-4067-3933-2.
