= Rasgueado =

Guitar finger strumming technique associated with flamenco music

Rasgueado (also called Golpeado, Rageo (spelled so or Rajeo), Rasgueo or Rasgeo in Andalusian dialect and flamenco jargon, or even occasionally Rasqueado) is a guitar finger strumming technique commonly associated with flamenco guitar music. It is sometimes used on other fretted instruments such as the ukulele and in other styles of guitar playing. The rasgueado is executed using the fingers of the strumming hand in rhythmically precise, and often rapid, strumming patterns. The important characteristic of this strumming style is the fingernail (outer) side of the finger tips (as opposed to their fleshy inner side) is also used, and in such case, in reverse of the way it is done when the fleshy side of the finger tips is used, namely downward (index, middle, ring and little finger) and upward (thumb).

== History ==
Rasqueado in La Cumparsita by Pepe Romero

Although originating in the classical tradition, the technique is most often associated with flamenco guitar.

Its use in classical music is limited today, but an example of a piece employing rasgueado is Manuel de Falla's "The Miller's Dance" (a farruca from The Three-Cornered Hat). It is also heard in the Rodrigo Concierto de Aranjuez. Modern applications of the rasgueado technique can be seen in Luciano Berio's "Sequenza XI" and Tristan Murail's solo guitar piece Tellur. This technique is used in the arrangements of Pepe Romero, Paco de Lucía and other representatives of the style of "new flamenco".

== Technique ==
In contrast to ordinary strumming, which is usually done either with a plectrum, or with several fingers as a unit, rasgueado generally uses only one digit (finger, thumb, etc.) for each strum; this means that multiple strums can be done more quickly than usual by using multiple digits in quick succession. Furthermore the outer (fingernail) side of the finger tips that is also used and, as a result, in that case, the strumming direction is reversed from the usual one, so it's a downstroke for the four fingers and an upstroke for the thumb. Flamenco guitarists often build up their fingernails using layers of silk and superglue to protect the nail from breaking. There is some loss of tonal quality with this practice, but without it, rasgueado is likely to break most fingernails after a time. The wooden table of the guitar is protected from the reinforced nails by a plastic plate called a "golpeador" which is stuck to the front beneath the soundhole.

There are several types of rasgueado, but the two main divisions are those that employ the forearm and thumb in conjunction and those that incorporate only the fingers. Of course, both approaches can be combined to allow for the use of all digits on the hand.
