= Giovanni Battista Granata =

Italian composer

Giovanni Battista Granata (1620/1621 – 1687) was an Italian Baroque guitar player and composer. He is generally known as the most prolific guitarist of the 17th century, publishing seven books during his lifetime. Along with many pieces in the standard dance genre of that time, Granata also composed many instrumental toccatas, preludes, and chaconnes. Granata was a barber-surgeon by profession.

== Biography ==
Granata was born in Turin, but moved to Bologna sometime around 1646, where he remained for the majority of his life. From 1651 to 1653, he was employed as liutista sopranumerario in the Concerto Palatino. Although he maintained his teaching and composing career throughout his life, his main employment was as a barber-surgeon for which he became licensed in 1659.

== Music/Style ==
The early baroque guitar works of Granata are characterized by their French organization of dance suites (allemande, courante, and sarabande). His style in the period around 1646 is very similar to that of his contemporary, Giovanni Paolo Foscarini. The works from Granata's middle period demonstrate his musical evolution and change in style. Many of the pieces are complex and regarded as some of the most virtuosic guitar music of that time. Granata's later period pushes the instrument even further with extensive use of campanelas, notes in the upper register, and complex rhythms.

Granata's fourth book - Soavi concenti (1659) - is one of the few sources to include pieces for the chitarra atiorbata, a five course instrument with seven open basses. Three of Granata's books also have works for ensemble. The pieces contained in Book IV call for a chamber ensemble of violin, guitar, and basso continuo, Book V for violin, viola, and guitar, and Book VII for guitar and basso continuo.

== Works ==
Granata's seven books, all published in Bologna, Italy:

- I- Capricci armonici sopra la chitarriglia spagnuola (1646)
- II- Nuove suonate di chitarriglia spagnuola piccicate, e battute (ca. 1650)
- III- Nuova scelta di caprici armonici, Op. 3 (1651)
- IV- Soavi concenti di sonate musicali per la chitarra spagnuola, Op. 4 (1659)
- V- Novi capricci armonici musicali in vari toni per la chitarra spagnola, violino, e viola concertati, et altre sonate per la chitarra sola, Op. 5 (1674)
- VI- Nuovi sovavi concenti di sonate musicali in varii toni per la chitarra spagnola, et altre sonate concertate a due violini, e basso, Op. 6 (1680)
- VII- Armonici toni di vari suonate musicali concertante, a due violini, e basso, con la chitarra spagnola, Op. 7 (1684)

== Similarity with 20th century work "Stairway to Heaven" ==
Granata's Sonata di Chitarra, e Violino, con il suo Basso Continuo appeared in a surprising connection with a 1970 rock music work, Stairway to Heaven, by Jimmy Page and Robert Plant of the rock group Led Zeppelin. After Stairway to Heaven achieved tremendous success, a dispute arose about whether part of the work was plagiarised. Commentators cited numerous earlier works with some degree of similarity, including Granata's Sonata. However, the similarity was not evidence that Page and Plant plagiarised Granata.
