= Jean-Nicolas Geoffroy =

French harpsichordist, organist and composer

Jean-Nicolas Geoffroy (1633 – 11 March 1694) was a French harpsichordist, organist and composer. His birthplace is unknown; he died in Perpignan.

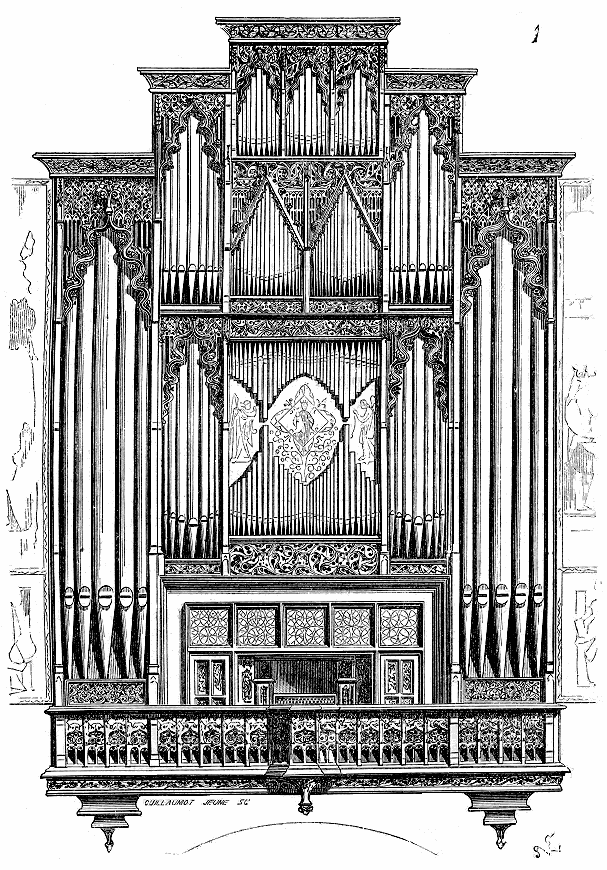
Organ of Saint-Jean-Baptiste cathedral, in Perpignan

His life before 1690 is unknown; he was probably a pupil of Nicolas Lebègue and served as titular organist of the Saint-Nicolas-du-Chardonnet church in Paris. He was considered an expert in organ building and at some point in life settled in Perpignan where he played the organ of Perpignan Cathedral (Cathédrale Saint-Jean-Baptiste).

Geoffroy's harpsichord oeuvre is, along with those of François Couperin and Jean-François Dandrieu, one of the most important contributions to French music of the Baroque era. A single collection of his pieces survives in manuscript. It contains 255 pieces and is unique for European music of the late 17th century because the pieces systematically explore all major and minor keys.

== Bibliography ==
- J.-N. Geoffroy, Stabat Mater - A 4 voice A Cappella (or Organ Continuo) version. Paris, 1675 c.ca. Modern transcription by M.G. Genesi, Milan, Tip. Giusti, 2009, pp. 20.
