= Giovanni Paolo Foscarini =

Italian composer

Giovanni Paolo Foscarini (fl. 1600 – 1647) was an Italian guitarist, lutenist, theorist and composer.

A note at the end of the list of contents in his earliest surviving guitar book Intavolatura di chitarra spagnola. Libro secondo (1629) refers to him a Musico, e Sonatore, di Liuto e Tiorba, della Venerabile Compagnia del Saatissimo [sic] Sacramento d'Ancona. He was also a member of the Accademia dei Caliginosi in Ancona, identifying himself in his earlier books only by the name of the society together with his own academic name Il Furioso. In the introduction to his third book printed in about 1630, he claims to be well known as a lutenist both in Italy and abroad, especially at the court of Archduke Alberto in the Spanish Netherlands. Archduke Albert, a nephew of Philip II of Spain, was governor of the Spanish Netherlands from 1595 until his death in 1621. Foscarini must have been in the Netherlands, sometime before that date. He was active in Rome, Venice, Brussels, and Paris. Letters which he wrote to the Dutch scholar Constantijn Huygens from Paris at the beginning of 1649, give some information about his later years. He was planning to travel to Italy, but was ill in bed and without funds for the journey. He may have died soon after.

His Il primo, secondo e terzo libro della chitarra spagnola printed in about 1630 is the earliest known engraved Italian guitar tablature. This includes pieces from his two earlier books, (no copies of his Libro primo are extant) all in the strummed style notated in alfabeto together with a third book which includes pieces in mixed battute-pizzicato style notated in italian lute tablature combined with alfabeto. A fourth book was added to the edition printed in about 1632 - I quatro libri della chitarra spagnola. The final version, with a dedication to the French nobleman, Charles of Lorraine, Duke of Guise is signed by Foscarini and dated Rome 15 September 1640. It includes a fifth book and has the title Li cinque libri della chitarra alla spagnola. His notation is idiosyncratic and sometimes difficult to decipher, but the music is very attractive and encompasses the entire Italian guitar repertory of the period. It was highly regarded during his lifetime. In the preface, Foscarini gives detailed instructions about his notation and discusses three playing styles: battute (strummed), pizzicato (plucked) which he deemed more appropriate to the lute, and a mixture of the two, which he employs predominantly in the three later books. Although, it is unlikely that he alone invented this mixed style playing (there are earlier manuscript sources), Foscarini was obviously an important influence on later composers such as Angelo Michele Bartolotti and Francesco Corbetta.

== List of works ==
=== Music ===
1. Libro primo (lost; contents reprinted in (3))
2. Intavolatura di chitarra spagnola, libro secondo (Macerata, 1629)
3. Il primo, secondo e terzo libro della chitarra spagnola (includes (1) and (2))
4. I 4 libri della chitarra spagnola (includes (3))
5. Li 5 libri della chitarra alla spagnola (Rome, 1640; includes (3))
6. Inventione di toccate sopra la chitarra spagnuola (Rome, 1640; contents identical to (5))

=== Writings ===
- Dell'armonia del mondo, lettione due (Paris, 1647)
