= Stepanovsky (surname) =

Stepanovsky (masculine), Stepanovskaya (feminine) is an East Slavic family name. It is also the spelling without diacritics of the Czech and Slovak surname Štepanovský/Štěpanovský. Notable people with the surname include:

- Ivan Stepanovsky (1710 - ?), Ukrainian lutenist
- Martin Štěpanovský (born 1988), Czech footballer
- Peter Štepanovský (born 1988), Slovak football midfielder
