= Johann Sigismund Weiss =

German lute player (after 1690 – 1737)

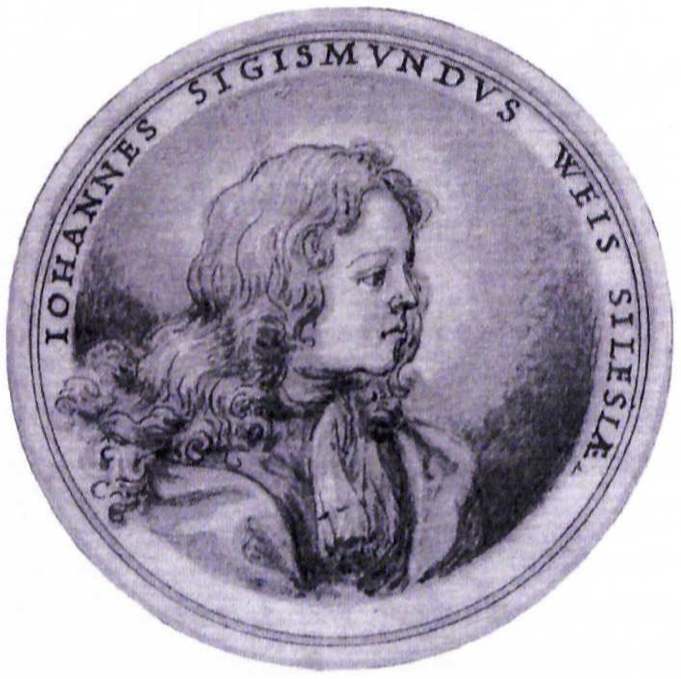
- Weiss in 1709; medallion drawing by Giorgio Maria Rapparini
- Born: after 1690 probably Breslau, Silesia
- Died: 12 April 1737; Mannheim
- Occupations: Lutenist; Composer
- Organizations: Mannheim court orchestra
- Relatives: Silvius Leopold Weiss (brother)

Johann Sigismund Weiss (after 1690 – 12 April 1737) was a German lutenist and composer. He was probably born in Breslau, Silesia (now Wrocław, Poland) to lutenist Johann Jacob Weiss, who taught the lute to Johann Sigismund and his elder siblings Silvius Leopold and Juliana Margaretha. From c. 1708, Weiss and his father were employed by Johann Wilhelm, Elector Palatine. An important performance during this time included at the 1711 imperial election, before Charles VI, Holy Roman Emperor, and many German princes. After the elector died in 1716, Weiss faced some uncertainty. He spent some time travelling and giving concerts, particularly in London, where he gave at least 19 concerts in 1718. Under the new Elector Charles III Philip, Weiss became vice-concertmaster and later concertmaster of his court orchestra in Mannheim.

Not many compositions are known with certainty to be his, and they have not been the subject of much attention. In his time, he was praised by Ernst Gottlieb Baron as comparable to his brother Silvius. In Hans Neemann's opinion, Weiss was an important predecessor of Johann Stamitz at Mannheim.

== Family background and early life ==
Weiss was probably born in Breslau (now Wrocław, Poland) between 1690 and 1695. (Note: His older sister Juliana was baptised on 21 September 1690; based on the Rapparini manuscript, musicologist Frank Legl suggests Johann Sigismund Weiss was born in 1695. In The New Grove Dictionary of Music and Musicians, the birth year is given as "after 1690".) His parents were the lutenist Johann Jacob Weiss and his wife Anna Margaretha, whose maiden name is not known. He and his older siblings Silvius Leopold and Juliana Margaretha learned to play the lute from their father. Nothing more is known about his musical education, but based on the quality of his compositions and the level of his later employment, the musicologist Markus Lutz considers it unquestionable that Weiss also had a solid grounding in musical theory.

== Career ==
=== Musician for Johann Wilhelm, Elector Palatine ===
In April 1706, Weiss's older brother Silvius gave concerts at the Düsseldorf court of Johann Wilhelm, Elector Palatine, who was greatly impressed by his lute playing. Around 1708, the Elector employed Johann Sigismund Weiss and his father. Weiss's sister Juliana moved to Düsseldorf with them, possibly also to work for the Elector. In a manuscript drawn and written by Giorgio Maria Rapparini for the Elector's name day in 1709, Le portrait du vrai mérite dans la personne serenissime de Monseigneur L'Electeur Palatin ('The portrait of true virtue in the most serene person of the Elector Palatine'), Weiss is mentioned as one of five court musicians, while his father is described as his teacher. Rapparini praises Weiss as a young virtuoso lutenist. The description is accompanied by a sketch, which is the only known portrait showing Weiss.

When the Elector went to Frankfurt for the 1711 imperial election, he was accompanied by musicians including Weiss and his father. There, they played before Charles VI, Holy Roman Emperor, and all of the German princes who were present. The Elector died in 1716, leading to some degree of uncertainty for his musicians. In 1717, Weiss and his father earned a combined salary of 1,000 florins. Weiss had little to do in Düsseldorf and spent some time travelling and giving concerts, in particular in London and probably also in other places.

=== London concerts ===
Between February and July 1718, Weiss gave concerts in London. While the musicologist Douglas Alton Smith had assumed in 1980 that the musician, whose name was given as "Mr Weys" or "Mr Weiss" was Silvius,, this assumption was later disproven as Silvius was in Dresden in April 1718. According to advertisements in the Daily Courant, there were at least 19 concerts, most of them in Park Place, close to St James's Palace. The final two concerts were in the Wallnut Tree, a tavern in St Paul's Churchyard. The solo instruments included lute, mandolin, oboe and bass viol. From March 1718, the advertisements stated that all pieces were composed by Weiss. Tickets cost 5 shillings, approximately two days' wages of a skilled labourer or three days' wages of an unskilled labourer. At least once, Weiss also played before the king.

=== Concertmaster in Mannheim ===
The new Elector succeeding Johann Wilhelm in 1716 was his brother Charles III Philip, who until August 1718 was also the employer of Weiss's brother Silvius. Charles had another orchestra in his previous residence in Innsbruck and merged it with that of the Düsseldorf court. The capital of the Electoral Palatinate and the court was moved to Mannheim in 1720. Weiss was listed as vice-concertmaster of the court orchestra in 1723 and as concertmaster in 1734.

== Personal life ==
Weiss was married twice: his first marriage on 20 November 1726 in Mannheim was to Anna Katharina Elisabetha Itschbach, who died in 1732. They had two known children. In 1734 or 1735, he then married Johanna Gertraud Lauer, with whom he had two sons. Weiss died on 12 April 1737 in Mannheim. His last child Johann Jacob Lorenz Weiss was born after his father's death; Juliana Weiss and her husband served as the godparents. Weiss's widow died before September 1757.

== Works and legacy ==
Few compositions can be attributed with certainty to Weiss, and these few, according to the authors of The New Grove Dictionary of Music and Musicians, "have received little attention". No manuscripts in his own hand are known to survive. Weiss's earliest known composition is a sarabande for lute from 1712. Several other manuscripts contain lute music of unclear authorship that might be by either of the Weiss brothers. Some compositions for instruments other than the lute are certainly by Johann Sigismund Weiss, in particular a concerto for oboe and strings in D minor and nine sonatas for various instruments. A flute sonata by George Frideric Handel had been mistakenly attributed to Weiss in a manuscript.

The musician and music theorist Ernst Gottlieb Baron praised Weiss as comparable to his brother Silvius with regards to his lute works, and said he was "additionally an excellent gamba player, violinist and composer". The lutenist and musicologist Hans Neemann considered him an important predecessor of Johann Stamitz at Mannheim.

== Sources ==
- Croll, Gerhard (1958). "Musikgeschichtliches aus Rapparinis Johann-Wilhelm-Manuskript (1709)". Die Musikforschung (in German). 11 (3): 257–264. ISSN 0027-4801.
- Hoffmann-Erbrecht, Lothar (12 March 2012). "Schlesische Lautenisten in Mitteldeutschland". In Garber, Klaus (ed.). Kulturgeschichte Schlesiens in der Frühen Neuzeit (in German). Max Niemeyer Verlag. pp. 933–940. doi:10.1515/9783110942545.933. ISBN 978-3-11-094254-5.
- Lasocki, David; Best, Terence (1981). "A New Flute Sonata by Handel". Early Music. 9 (3): 307–311. ISSN 0306-1078.
- Legl, Frank (1998). "Between Grottkau and Neuburg: New information on the biography of Silvius Leopold Weiss". Journal of the Lute Society of America. 31. Translated by Smith, Douglas Alton: 49–77.
- Legl, Frank (2020). "Weiss, Silvius". Neue Deutsche Biographie (in German). Vol. 27. Berlin: Duncker & Humblot. pp. 696–698. (full text online).
- Lutz, Markus (2017). "'über diß ein vortrefflicher Gambist und Violinist und Componist' - Im Schatten des älteren Bruders: Johann Sigismund Weiss". Die Laute. Jahrbuch der Deutschen Lautengesellschaft (in German). 13: 46–84. ISSN 1437-3378. OCLC 881078443.
- Lutz, Markus (2019). "Die Londoner Konzerte von Johann Sigismund Weiss im Jahre 1718 und ein Auftritt seines Neffen Johann Adolf Faustinus Weiss in London 55 Jahre später". Die Laute. Jahrbuch der Deutschen Lautengesellschaft (in German). 12: 87–109. ISSN 1437-3378. OCLC 881078443.
- Neemann, Hans (1939). "Die Lautenistenfamilie Weiß". Archiv für Musikforschung. 4: 157–189.
- Reilly, Edward R.; Smith, Douglas Alton; Crawford, Tim (20 January 2001). "Weiss, Johann Sigismund". Grove Music Online (8th ed.). Oxford University Press. ISBN 978-1-56159-263-0. (subscription, Wikilibrary access, or UK public library membership required)
- Smith, Douglas Alton (1980). "Sylvius Leopold Weiss". Early Music. 8 (1): 47–58. doi:10.1093/earlyj/8.1.47. ISSN 0306-1078. JSTOR 3126635.
- Smith, Douglas Alton (1998). "A Biography of Silvius Leopold Weiss". Journal of the Lute Society of America. 31: 1–48.
