= List of compositions by Sylvius Leopold Weiss =

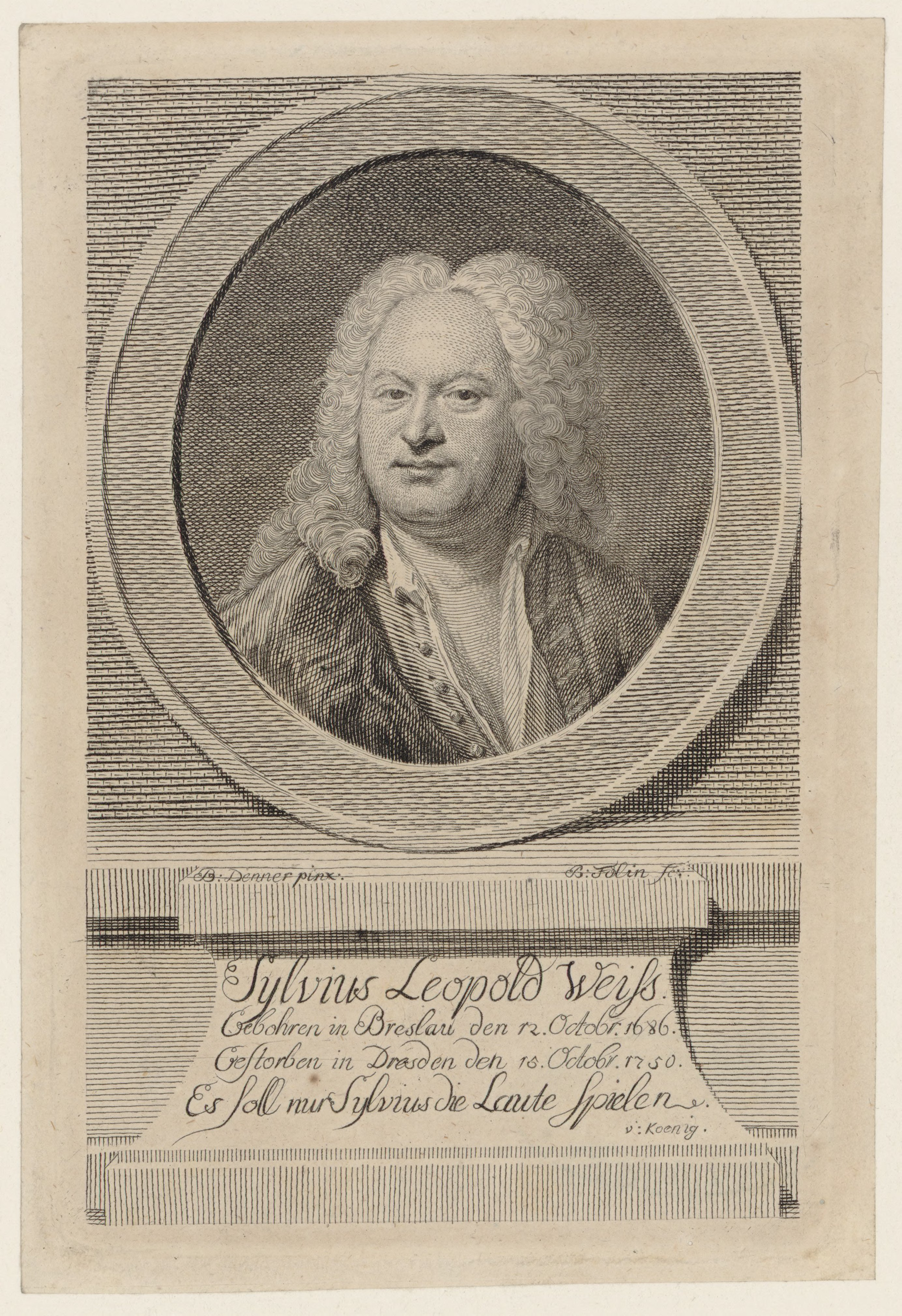
Sylvius Leopold Weiss

List of all known attributed compositions by Sylvius Leopold Weiss (1686–1750), German composer and lutenist.

== Description of columns ==
- Name: Name of the piece
- Key: Key of the piece
- WeissSW: Weiss Sämtliche Werke number
- Sm: Smith number
- Klima: Klima number
- A-ETgoëssV: Folio number in A-ETgoëss Ms. V Bibliothek von Graf Goëss, Schloss Ebenthal, Kärnten
- A-ETgoëssX: Folio number in A-ETGoëss Ms. X Goëss Hueber (1740), Bibliothek von Graf Goëss, Schloss Ebenthal, Kärnten
- A-GÖI: Folio number in A-GÖ Ms. Lautentabulatur Nr. 1(D.A.Smith = N°. 2), Kloster Göttweig
- A-KR156: A-KR Ms. L156 "Eggerspergerische Lautenstuckh", Abtei Kremsmünster
- A-KR77: Folio number in A-KR Ms. L77 Benediktinerstift Kremsmünster
- A-KR78: Folio number in A-KR Ms. L78 Benediktinerstift Kremsmünster
- A-ROI: Folio number in A-RO Ms. 1 "Weiss Sylvio – Lautenmusik", Schloß Rohrau
- A-ROII: Folio number in A-RO Ms. 2 "Lauten Musik von unbekannten Componisten", Schloß Rohrau
- A-SEI: Folio number in A-SEI Stiftsbibliothek von Seitenstetten
- A-Su: Folio number in A-Su M III 25 Salzburg Ms., Studienbibliothek von Salzburg
- A-Wn1078: Folio number in A-Wn Ms. Suppl. Mus. 1078 Österreichische Nationalbibliothek von Wien
- A-Wn18761: Folio number in A-Wn Ms. Mus. 18761 Österreichische Nationalbibliothek von Wien
- A-Wn18829: Folio number in A-Wn Ms. Mus. 18829 Österreichische Nationalbibliothek von Wien
- B-Bc15: Folio number in B-Bc Litt. S. N°.15.132 Conservatoire Royal de Bruxelles
- B-Bc27: Folio number in B-Bc Litt. S. N°.27.885 Conservatoire Royal de Bruxelles
- B-Bc5: Folio number in B-Bc Litt. S. N°.5.619 Conservatoire Royal de Bruxelles
- B-Br4087: Folio number in B-Br Ms. II. 4087 Bibliothèque Royale de Bruxelles
- B-Br4089: Folio number in B-Br Ms. II. 4089 Bibliothèque Royale de Bruxelles
- Bk: Entry in Thematischer Katalog Breitkopf, Supplement IV, 1769
- BWV 1025: Entry in BWV 1025 A dur. / Trio / per il / Cembalo obligato. / con / Violino. / da. J. S. Bach.
- CZ-Bm371: Folio number in Cz-Bm Ms. Inv. 745/A.371 Oddělení hudebně historické Moravského muzea Brno
- CZ-Bm372: Folio number in Cz-Bm Ms. Inv. 746/A.372 Oddělení hudebně historické Moravského muzea Brno
- CZ-PaRPI: Folio number in CZ-Pa ms. ŘPI504 Praha, Státní ústřední archív
- CZ-Pnm: Folio number in CZ-Pnm Ms. IV.E.36 Knihovna Národního muzea Praha
- CZ-POm: Folio number in CZ-POm s. c. III Helichovo muzeum Poděbrady
- CZ-Pst: Folio number in CZ-Pst (Strahov Ms) Praha, Památník národního písemnictví (Strahov)
- D-As: Folio number in D-As Ms. Tonkunst 2° fasc. III Stadtbibliothek von Augsburg
- D-Dl: Folio number in Ms. Mus. 2841-V-1 Dresden Weiss manuscript, Sächsische Landesbibliothek von Dresden
- D-Fschneider33: Folio number in D-Fschneider Ms. 33 Bohusch Ms, Privatbibliothek Matthias Schneider, Frankfurt
- D-Gs: Folio number in D-Gs 8° Philos. 84k Niedersächsische Staats- und Universitätsbibliothek von Göttingen
- D-KNu: Folio number in D-KNu 5.P.177 Universitäts-und Stadtbibliothek von Köln
- D-LEmRosani: Folio number in D-LEm Ms. III.11.64 Rosani ms., Musikbibliothek der Stadt Leipzig
- D-Mbs: Folio number in D-Mbs Mus. Ms. 5362 Bayerische Staatsbibliothek von München
- D-RH879: Folio number in D-RH Ms 879 (olim: 604) Rheda Ms., Fürst zu Bentheim-Tecklenburgische Musikbibliothek Rheda
- D-ROu52.2: Folio number in D-ROu XVII.18-52.2 Universitätsbibliothek von Rostock
- D-ROu53.1A: Folio number in D-ROu XVII.18-53.1A Universitätsbibliothek von Rostock
- D-ROu53.1B: Folio number in D-ROu XVII.18-53.1B Universitätsbibliothek von Rostock
- D-ROu65.6: Folio number in D-ROu XVIII-65.6a-z Universitätsbibliothek von Rostock
- D-Witt: Folio number in D-BLfk M 184a Wittgenstein ms. (olim Belletr. / 272, "Anleitung zum Singen"), Bad Laasphe, Fürst Wittgensteinsches Archiv Bad Laasphe
- F-PnI: Folio number in F-Pn Rés Vma ms. 1213 (olim LL 244) "Weiss à Rome" (PthI), Bibliothèque Nationale de Paris
- F-PnII: Folio number in F-Pn Rés. Vmc ms. 61 "Venetiis / 7 7br. 1712" (PthII), Bibliothèque Nationale de Paris
- F-Sim: Folio number in F-Sim Ms. RM 271 Baltic lute book, Bibliothèque de l'Institut de Musicologie de l'Universite de Strasbourg
- GB-HA: Folio number in GB-HAdolmetsch Ms. II.B.2 The Library of Carl Dolmetsch, Haslemere
- GB-Lbl30387: Folio number in GB-Lbl Ms. Add. 30387 London Weiss ms., British Library of London
- GB-Lbl31698: Folio number in GB-Lbl Ms. Add. 31698 Straube Lute book, British Library of London
- I-VgcChilesotti: Folio number in I-BDG ms. sans cote Chilesotti's transcription of a missing manuscript, Cini Stiftung von Venedig
- NL-DHgm50536: Folio number in NL-DHgm 50536 Den Haag Gementemuseum
- PL-Kj40633: Folio number in PL-Kj Mus. ms. 40620 Kraków, Biblioteka Jagiellońska
- PL-Wn396: Folio number in PL-Wn Rps. Muz. 396 Warszawa Biblioteka Narodowa
- PL-WRu: Folio number in PL-WRu 60019 Odds. mus. (olim Ms. MF. 2002), Wrocław, Biblioteka Uniwersytecka
- PL-Wu2003: Folio number in PL-Wu Ms. RM 4136 (olim Ms. MF. 2003), Warszawa, Biblioteka Uniwersytecka
- PL-Wu2004: Folio number in PL-Wu Ms. RM 4137 (olim Ms. MF. 2004), Warszawa, Biblioteka Uniwersytecka
- PL-Wu2005: Folio number in PL-Wu Ms. RM 4138 (olim Ms. MF. 2005), Warszawa, Biblioteka Uniwersytecka
- PL-Wu2006: Folio number in PL-Wu Ms. RM 4139 (olim Ms. MF. 2006), Warszawa, Biblioteka Uniwersytecka
- PL-Wu2008: Folio number in PL-Wu Ms. RM 4140 (olim Ms. MF. 2008), Warszawa, Biblioteka Uniwersytecka
- PL-Wu2009: Folio number in PL-Wu Ms. RM 4141 (olim Ms. MF. 2009), Warszawa, Biblioteka Uniwersytecka
- PL-Wu2010: Folio number in PL-Wu Ms. RM 4142 (olim Ms. MF. 2010), Warszawa, Biblioteka Uniwersytecka
- PL-Wu8135: Folio number in PL-Wu Ms. RM 8135 (olim Ms. 1938.111; Inv. 8735), Warszawa, Biblioteka Uniwersytecka
- RA-BAn: Folio number in RA-BAn Ms. 236R Biblioteca Nacional de Buenos Aires
- RF-Mcm: Folio number in RF-Mcm 282, N 8 Moskow Weiss ms., Glinka Museum Moskau
- S-SK: Folio number in S-SK Katadralsskolans Musiksamling 493 (Nr. 30) Stifts- och landsbiblioteket, Skara
- S-Ssmf2: Folio number in S-Ssmf2 Nydahl ms
- US-NYp: Folio number in US-NYp Ms. JOG 72-29 New York Public Library

== Sonatas ==
=== Sonata in F major, WeissSW 1 ===
WeissSW	Sm	Klima	Name	Key	GB-Lbl30387	A-ROII	PL-Wu2004	PL-Wu2003	D-Dl	PL-Wu2005	A-Wn1078	D-ROu53.1A
1.1	1	82	Prelude	F major	1r							
1.2	2	83	Allemande	F major	1v	52r	5v	2r	11	1	39v	
1.3	3	84	Courante	F major	2v	52v	6v	2v	12	2	40v	75v
1.4	4	85	Bourrée	F major	3v	54v	6r	3r	13	3		
1.5	5	86	Sarabande	D minor	4r	55r	7r	3v	13	4	42v	
1.6	6	87	Menuet	F major	4v	55v			16			
1.7	7	88	Gigue	F major	5r	56v	8r	4v	14	6	43v	
1.8	8	89	Menuet	F major	6r							
1.9	9	90	Menuet	F major	6v		7v	3v		4		
1.10	10	91	Gavotte	F major	7r							
1.11	423		Prelude	F major							45v	
1.12	573	94	Chaconne	F major		43v	9r					

=== Sonata in D major, WeissSW 2 ===
WeissSW	Sm	Klima	Name	Key	GB-Lbl30387	PL-Wu2004	A-Su	PL-Wu2010	A-ROII	F-PnII	RF-Mcm	A-Wn18829	D-Mbs	A-KR77	CZ-Pst	CZ-POm
2.1	11	29,151	Prelude	D major	7v						9r	7v				
2.2	12	30	Allemande	D major	8r	41v		36	20v	15v						
2.3	13	31,46	Courante	D major	8v	42v	28r									
2.4	14	32,47	Bourrée	D major	9v	42r	27r									
2.5	15	33	Sarabande	D major	9v	43v										
2.6	16	34	Menuet	D major	10r			231	22v				32v	65v	81-2	
2.7	17	35	Gigue	D major	10v											20
2.8	18		Gavotte	D major	11v											
2.9			Gavotte	D major	11v											
2.10	576	36	Chaconne	D major		44r										

=== Sonata in G minor, WeissSW 3 ===
WeissSW	Sm	Klima	Name	Key	GB-Lbl30387
3.1	19	74	Prelude	G minor	12r
3.2	20	75	Allemande	G minor	12v
3.3	21	76	Courante	G minor	13v
3.4	22	77	Bourrée	G minor	14v
3.5	23	78	Sarabande	G minor	15v
3.6	24	79	Menuet	G minor	16r
3.7	25	80	Menuet	B♭ major	16v

=== Sonata in B♭ major, WeissSW 4 ===
WeissSW	Sm	Klima	Name	Key	D-Dl	GB-Lbl30387	CZ-POm
4.1	26	116	Prelude	B♭ major		17r	
4.2	27	117	Ouverture	B♭ major	202	17v	
4.3	28	120	Courante	B♭ major	204	18v	
4.4	30	121	Bourrée	B♭ major	206	20r	6
4.4 (b)	334	121	Bourrée	B♭ major	206		
4.5	336	123	Menuet	B♭ major	208		
4.6	335	122	Gavotte	B♭ major	207		

=== Sonata in G major, WeissSW 5 ===
WeissSW	Sm	Klima	Name	Key	GB-Lbl30387	Bk
5.1	32	37	Prelude	G major	21v	
5.2	33	38	Allemande	G major	22r	56
5.3	34	39	Courante	G major	22v	
5.4	35	40	Bourrée	G major	23v	
5.5	36	41	Sarabande	G major	24r	
5.6	37	42	Menuet	G major	24v	
5.7	38	43	Gigue	G major	24v	

=== Sonata in B♭ major, WeissSW 6 ===
WeissSW	Sm	Klima	Name	Key	GB-Lbl30387	D-Dl
6.1			Adagio	B♭ major	25v	VI/19
6.2			Allegro	B♭ major	26v	VI/20
6.3			Grave	G minor	28v	VI/22
6.4			Allegro	B♭ major	29v	VI/22

=== Sonata in C minor, WeissSW 7 ===
WeissSW	Sm	Klima	Name	Key	GB-Lbl30387	D-Dl	A-ROI	Bk	F-PnII
7.1	39	1	Allemande	C minor	30r	262		19	22v
7.2	40	2	Courante	C minor	30v	263	33v		
7.3	41	3	Gavotte	C minor	31r	265			
7.4	42	4	Sarabande	C minor	31v	264			
7.5	43	5	Menuet	C minor	31v		34r		
7.6	44	6	Gigue	C minor	32v	266	34v		

=== Sonata in B♭ major, WeissSW 8 ===
WeissSW	Sm	Klima	Name	Key	GB-Lbl30387
8.1			Andante	B♭ major	33v
8.1 (b)			Presto	B♭ major	34v
8.2			Andante	B♭ major	34v
8.3			Allegro	B♭ major	35v

=== Sonata in F major, WeissSW 9 ===
WeissSW	Sm	Klima	Name	Key	GB-Lbl30387
9.1			Adagio	F major	36r
9.2			Allegro	F major	36v
9.3			Amoroso	D minor	37v
9.4			Allegro	F major	38v

=== Sonata in E♭ major, WeissSW 10 ===
WeissSW	Sm	Klima	Name	Key	GB-Lbl30387	D-Dl
10.1	46	49	Prelude	E♭ major	40v	
10.2	47	50	Prelude	E♭ major	41r	
10.3	48	51	Allemande	E♭ major	41v	
10.4	49	52,303	Courante	E♭ major	42v	290
10.5	50	53	Bourrée	E♭ major	43v	
10.6	51	54	Sarabande	E♭ major	44r	
10.7	52	55	Menuet	E♭ major	44v	
10.8	53	56	Chaconne	E♭ major	45v	

=== Sonata in D minor, WeissSW 11 ===
WeissSW	Sm	Klima	Name	Key	D-Dl	GB-Lbl30387	PL-Wu2005	PL-Wu2003	PL-Wu2004	D-ROu53.1A	D-Mbs	RF-Mcm
11.1	55	15	Allemande	D minor	34	47r	34	69r		55v		
11.2	56	16	Courante	D minor	35	47v	36	69v	1v			
11.3	57	17	Gavotte	D minor	36	48v	35	70r				
11.4	58	18	Sarabande	D minor	36	49r	37	70v				
11.5	59	19	Menuet	D minor	37	49v	40	71v	2v			
11.6	60	20	Gigue	D minor	38	50v	38	70v	3v			
11.7	241	14	Fantasia	D minor	33						5v	11v

=== Sonata in A major, WeissSW 12 ===
WeissSW	Sm	Klima	Name	Key	GB-Lbl30387	D-Dl	A-Wn18829	PL-Wu2004	CZ-POm	D-As	Bk
12.1	61	66	Allemande	A major	51v	136	22v				
12.2	62	67	Courante	A major	52r	136	23v		14		
12.3	63	68	Bourrée	A major	52v	138		10v			
12.4	64	70	Sarabande	F♯ minor	53v		24v	11r			
12.5	65	69	Menuet	A major	54r	139		11v			
12.6	66	72	Chaconne	A major	54v	140	25v			Fasc.7	
12.7	67	71,150	Gigue	A major	55v	158	18v	11v	18		
12.8	299	65	Prelude	A major		135					2
12.9	574		Prelude	A major				10r			
12.10	421	73	Prelude	A major			21v				

=== Sonata in D minor, WeissSW 13 ===
WeissSW	Sm	Klima	Name	Key	GB-Lbl30387	D-ROu53.1A	A-GÖI	GB-Lbl31698	I-VgcChilesotti	RA-BAn	RF-Mcm	F-Sim	PL-Wu2004	PL-Wu2008	PL-Wu2009
13.1	68		Prelude	D minor	56v										
13.2	69		Allemande	D minor	57r										
13.3	70		Courante	D minor	57v	57v									
13.4	71		Bourrée	D minor	39v	59v	12r	33v	448	45v	6v	21r	3r	70	88
13.5	72		Menuet	D minor	58v	61v	12r								

=== Sonata in G minor, WeissSW 14 ===
WeissSW	Sm	Klima	Name	Key	GB-Lbl30387
14.1	75	102	Adagio	G minor	61v
14.2	76	103	Gavotte	G minor	62r
14.3	77	104	Sarabande	G minor	62v
14.4	78	105	Menuet	B♭ major	62v
14.5	79	106	Bourrée	G minor	63v
14.6	80	107	Chaconne	G minor	64v

=== Sonata in B♭ major, WeissSW 15 ===
WeissSW	Sm	Klima	Name	Key	GB-Lbl30387	PL-Wu2004	D-Dl
15.1	85	142,224	Sarabande	B♭ major	69r		221
15.2	86	135,221	Allemande	B♭ major	69v	16v	217
15.3	87	136,222	Courante	B♭ major	70v	17v	218
15.4	88	137	Paysanne	B♭ major	71v	18v	
15.5	89	139	Sarabande	B♭ major	72r	19v	
15.6	90	138	Menuet	B♭ major	72v	19r	
15.7	91	140,227	Gigue	B♭ major	73v	20v	224

=== Sonata in A major, WeissSW 16 ===
WeissSW	Sm	Klima	Name	Key	GB-Lbl30387	D-Dl	A-Wn18829	CZ-POm	GB-HA	Bk	A-Wn1078
16.1	92	143	Allemande	A major	74v	152	13v			3	
16.2	93	144,149	Rondeau	A major	75v	156			29		
16.3	94	145	Paysanne	A major	76r	154	16v	13	141		
16.4	95	146	Sarabande	A major	76v	155	17v				
16.5	96	147	Menuet	A major	77r	157	20v	15			47v
16.6	97	148	Pastorale	A major	77v						

=== Sonata in C major, WeissSW 17 ===
WeissSW	Sm	Klima	Name	Key	GB-Lbl30387	A-Su
17.1	98	228	Allemande	C major	78v	60v
17.2	99	229	Courante	C major	79v	61v
17.3	100	230	Bourrée	C major	80v	63v
17.4	101	231	Sarabande	C major	81v	
17.5	102	232	Menuet	C major	82r	64v
17.6	103	233	Paysanne	C major	82v	62v

=== Sonata in D major, WeissSW 18 ===
WeissSW	Sm	Klima	Name	Key	GB-Lbl30387	A-Wn18829	A-Wn1078	F-Sim	Bk	PL-Wu2004	RA-BAn	I-VgcChilesotti	GB-HA
18.1	104	152	Allemande	D major	83v	8v			23				
18.2	105	153	Courante	D major	84v	9v							
18.3	106	154	Angloise	D major	85v	12v	46v	18v		35v	90v	518.7	
18.4	107	155	Sarabande	D major	86r	11v							
18.5	108	155[bis]	Menuet	D major	86v								
18.6	109	156	Passacaglia	D major	87v								73

=== Sonata in F major, WeissSW 19 ===
WeissSW	Sm	Klima	Name	Key	GB-Lbl30387	D-ROu53.1A	D-ROu65.6	D-Mbs	PL-Wu2003
19.1	113	183	Prelude	F major	91r				
19.2	114	184	Allemande	F major	91v	28v			
19.3	115	185	Courante	F major	92v				
19.4	116	186	Bourrée	F major	93v	50v	s.2v		
19.5	117	187	Sarabande	D minor	94v				
19.6	118	188	Menuet	F major	95r			8v	
19.7	119	189	Gigue	F major	95v				75v

=== Sonata in D minor, WeissSW 20 ===
WeissSW	Sm	Klima	Name	Key	GB-Lbl30387
20.1	120	190	Prelude	D minor	96v
20.2	121	192	Andante	D minor	97r
20.3	122	193	Badinage	D minor	97v
20.4	123	194	Siciliana	D minor	98v
20.5	124	195	Menuet	F major	99r
20.6	125	196	Gigue	D minor	99v

=== Sonata in F minor, WeissSW 21 ===
WeissSW	Sm	Klima	Name	Key	GB-Lbl30387	D-Dl	Bk
21.1	128	199	Allemande	F minor	100v	235	48
21.2	129	200	Courante	F minor	101v	236	
21.3	130	201	Sarabande	F minor	102v	239	
21.4	131	202	Bourrée	F minor	103v	238	
21.5	132	203	Menuet	F minor	104r	242	
21.6	133	204	Gigue	F minor	104v	240	

=== Sonata in G major, WeissSW 22 ===
WeissSW	Sm	Klima	Name	Key	GB-Lbl30387	Bk
22.1	134	205	Prelude	G major	105v	
22.2	135	206	Toccata	G major	106r	53
22.3	137	208	Courante	G major	107v	
22.4	138	209	Bourrée	G major	108v	
22.5	139	210	Sarabande	E minor	109v	
22.6	140	211	Menuet	G major	110v	
22.7	141	212	Allegro	G major	111v	

=== Sonata in B♭ major, WeissSW 23 ===
WeissSW	Sm	Klima	Name	Key	GB-Lbl30387	D-Dl	D-Mbs
23.1	142	277	Prelude	B♭ major	112v		
23.2	143	278	Entrée	B♭ major	113r		
23.3	144	279,223	Bourrée	B♭ major	113v	220	20r
23.4	145	280	Bourrée	B♭ major	114r		
23.5	146	281,226	Gavotte	B♭ major	114v	222	
23.6	147	282	Gavotte	B♭ major	115r		
23.7	148	283	Sarabande	B♭ major	115v		
23.8	149	284,225	Menuet	B♭ major	115v	222	
23.9	150	285	Menuet	B♭ major	116r		
23.10	151	286	Saltarella	B♭ major	116v		

=== Sonata in C major, WeissSW 24 ===
WeissSW	Sm	Klima	Name	Key	GB-Lbl30387	D-Dl	D-Mbs
24.1	152	265	Ouverture	C major	117v		
24.2	153	267	Bourrée	C major	118v		
24.3	154	268	Aria	C major	118v		
24.4	155	269,180	Menuet	C major	119v	66	48v
24.5	156	270,181	Menuet	C minor	119v	66	
24.6	157	271	Gigue	C major	120v		

=== Sonata in G minor, WeissSW 25 ===
WeissSW	Sm	Klima	Name	Key	GB-Lbl30387	D-Dl
25.1	159	244	Allemande	G minor	122r	245
25.2	160	245	Passepied	G minor	122v	246
25.3	161	246	Bourrée	G minor	122v	246
25.4	162	250	Sarabande	G minor	123v	
25.5	163	248	Menuet	G minor	123v	249
25.6	164	249	Gigue	G minor	124v	250
25.7	350	247	Sarabande	B♭ major		248

=== Sonata in D major, WeissSW 26 ===
WeissSW	Sm	Klima	Name	Key	GB-Lbl30387	GB-HA	PL-Wu2003	PL-Wu2010	F-Sim	RA-BAn	I-VgcChilesotti	A-ETgoëssX
26.1	165	287	Prelude	D major	125v							
26.2	166	288	Marche	D major	126r							
26.3	167	289	Gavotte	D major	126v							
26.4	168	290	Aria	D major	126v							
26.5	169	291	Menuet	D major	127v							
26.6	170	292	Musette	D major	127v							
26.7	171	293	Rondeau	D major	128v							
26.8	172	294	Bourrée	D major	129r	41	33v	88	26r	56v	508.5	78v

=== Sonata in C minor, WeissSW 27 ===
WeissSW	Sm	Klima	Name	Key	GB-Lbl30387	D-Dl	A-Su	D-Mbs	Bk
27.1	173	257	Prelude	C minor	129v				
27.2	174	258	Allemande	C minor	130r	269	8r		20
27.3	175	259	Gavotte	C minor	130v	270	8v	15v	
27.4	176	260	Rondeau	C minor	131r	270	9r		
27.5	177	261	Sarabande	C minor	131v	272			
27.6	178	262	Menuet	C minor	132r	273	9v		
27.7	179	263	Rigaudon	C minor	132v	274	10r	16r	
27.8	180	264	Angloise	E♭ major	133r	275	10v		

=== Sonata in F major, WeissSW 28 ===
WeissSW	Sm	Klima	Name	Key	GB-Lbl30387	D-Dl	A-Wn1078	Bk	RF-Mcm
28.1	181	295	Allemande	F major	133v	17		39	
28.2	182	296	Courante	F major	134r	18			
28.3	183	297,92	Bourrée	F major	135v	20	41v		
28.4	184	298	Sarabande	F major	136r	21			
28.5	185	299,93	Menuet	F major	136v	24	43r		
28.6	186	300	Presto	F major	137v	22			13v

=== Sonata in A minor, WeissSW 29 ===
WeissSW	Sm	Klima	Name	Key	GB-Lbl30387	D-Dl	PL-Wu2003	PL-Wu2005
29.1	187	251	Entrée	A minor	138v	119		
29.2	188	252	Courante	A minor	139r	120		
29.3	189	253	Sarabande	A minor	139v	123		
29.4	190	254,220	Menuet	A minor	140r	122	58r	23
29.5	191	255	Musette	A minor	140v	121		
29.6	192	256	Paysanne	A minor	141r	124		

=== Sonata in E♭ major, WeissSW 30 ===
WeissSW	Sm	Klima	Name	Key	GB-Lbl30387	D-Dl	Bk
30.1	194	302	Prelude	E♭ major	142r		
30.2	193	302a	Allemande	E♭ major	141v	289	36
30.3	195	304	Rigaudon	E♭ major	142v	292	
30.4	196	305	Sarabande	E♭ major	143r	293	
30.5	197	306	Gavotte	E♭ major	143v	294	
30.6	198	307	Menuet	E♭ major	144r	295	
30.7	199	308	Allegro	E♭ major	144v	296	
30.8	364	52,303	Courante	E♭ major	42v	290	

=== Sonata in F major, WeissSW 31 ===
WeissSW	Sm	Klima	Name	Key	GB-Lbl30387
31.1	203	309	Allemande	F major	147r
31.2	204	310	Allegro	F major	147v
31.3	205	311	Bourrée	F major	148r
31.4	206	313	Menuet	F major	148v
31.5	207	314	Menuet	D minor	148v
31.6	208	315	Gigue	F major	149v
31.7	209	312	Bourrée	F major	150r

=== Sonata in F major, WeissSW 32 ===
WeissSW	Sm	Klima	Name	Key	D-Dl	GB-Lbl30387	PL-WRu	CZ-POm
32.1	219	241,234	Allemande	F major	6	156r	91	
32.2	220	235	Courante	F major	6	156v	92	
32.3	221	237	Bourrée	F major	8	157r	93	
32.4	222	236	Sarabande	D minor	7	157v	94	
32.5	223	238	Menuet	F major	8	158r	96	
32.6	224	242,28	Gigue	F major	5	158v	97	34
32.7	232	240	Gigue	F major	10			

=== Sonata in F major, WeissSW 33 ===
WeissSW	Sm	Klima	Name	Key	D-Dl	D-Mbs	Bk	CZ-POm
33.1	225	21	Prelude	F major	1		38	
33.2	226	22,309	Allemande	F major	2			
33.3	227	23	Courante	F major	2	6r		
33.4	228	24	Bourrée	F major	3			
33.5	229	25	Sarabande	F major	3			
33.6	230	26	Menuet	F major	4			7
33.7	231	27	Menuet	F major	4			
33.8		28,242	Gigue	F major	5			

=== Sonata in D minor, WeissSW 34 ===
WeissSW	Sm	Klima	Name	Key	D-Dl	D-Mbs	Bk	RF-Mcm
34.1	233	57	Prelude	D minor	25		31	
34.2	234	58	Allemande	D minor	26			
34.3	235	59	Courante	D minor	27	9v		
34.4	236	60	Bourrée	D minor	28			
34.5	237	61	Menuet	D minor	29	10r		
34.6	238	62	Sarabande	D minor	29	10r		3r
34.7	239	63	Menuet	D minor	30	10v		
34.8	240	64	Gigue	D minor	30			

=== Sonata in D minor, WeissSW 35 ===
WeissSW	Sm	Klima	Name	Key	D-Dl
35.1	242	420	Allemande	D minor	43
35.2	243	421	Courante	D minor	44
35.3	244	422	Paysanne	D minor	46
35.4	245	423	Sarabande	F major	47
35.5	247	424	Menuet	D minor	50
35.6	246	425	Allegro	D minor	48

=== Sonata in D minor, WeissSW 36 ===
WeissSW	Sm	Klima	Name	Key	D-Dl	RF-Mcm
36.1	248	393	Allemande	D minor	51	
36.2	249	394	Courante	D minor	52	12v
36.3	250	395	Bourrée	D minor	54	
36.4	251	396	Sarabande	F major	55	
36.5	252	397	Menuet	D minor	55	
36.6	253	398	Allegro	D minor	56	

=== Sonata in C major, WeissSW 37 ===
WeissSW	Sm	Klima	Name	Key	D-Dl	GB-HA	D-Mbs
37.1	254	177	Prelude	C major	61		
37.2	255	168	Allemande	C major	62		
37.3	256	169	Courante	C major	63	179	48v
37.4	257	178	Bourrée	C major	64	178	49r
37.5	258	179	Sarabande	C major	65		49v
37.6		180,269	Menuet	C major	66		
37.7	259	181,270	Menuet	C minor	66		
37.8	260	182	Presto	C major	67		

=== Sonata in C major, WeissSW 38 ===
WeissSW	Sm	Klima	Name	Key	D-Dl	Bk	RF-Mcm
38.1	262	342	Allemande	C major	71	12	
38.2	263	343	Courante	C major	72		
38.3	264	344	Bourrée	C major	74		
38.4	265	345	Sarabande	A minor	75		25v
38.5	267	346	Menuet	C major	78		
38.6	266	347	Presto	C major	76		

=== Sonata in C major, WeissSW 39 ===
WeissSW	Sm	Klima	Name	Key	D-Dl	Bk	A-GÖI
39.1	268	360	Ouverture	C major	80	PG4	
39.2	269	363	Courante	C major	82		
39.3	270	364	Bourrée	C major	84		
39.4	271	365	Sarabande	C major	85		
39.5	272	366	Menuet	C major	86		
39.6	273	367	Presto	C major	88		7v

=== Sonata in C major, WeissSW 40 ===
WeissSW	Sm	Klima	Name	Key	D-Dl
40.1	274	374	Entrée	C major	93
40.2	275	375	Courante	C major	94
40.3	276	376	Paysanne	C major	96
40.4	277	377	Sarabande	A minor	97
40.5	279	379	Menuet	C major	100
40.6	278	380	Allegro	C major	98

=== Sonata in A minor, WeissSW 41 ===
WeissSW	Sm	Klima	Name	Key	D-Dl	PL-Wu2003	PL-Wu2005	I-VgcChilesotti	D-Mbs	PL-WRu	Bk
41.1	280	214	Allemande	A minor	103	55v	18	523.3			
41.2	281	215	Courante	A minor	104	56v	20	524.1	11v	102	
41.3	282	216	Rigaudon	A minor	106	56r	19	524.2			
41.4	283	217	Sarabande	A minor	107	57v	22	525.1			
41.5	285	218	Menuet	A minor	109	57r	21		12v		
41.6	284	219	Gigue	A minor	108	58v	24	525.2			
41.7	580	213	Prelude	A minor				523.2			PG3

=== Sonata in A minor, WeissSW 42 ===
WeissSW	Sm	Klima	Name	Key	D-Dl
42.1	286	368	Allemande	A minor	111
42.2	287	369	Allegro	A minor	112
42.3	288	370	Bourrée	A minor	114
42.4	289	371	Sarabande	C major	115
42.5	291	372	Menuet	A minor	118
42.6	290	373	Gigue	A minor	116

=== Sonata in A minor, WeissSW 43 ===
WeissSW	Sm	Klima	Name	Key	D-Dl
43.1	292	413	Allemande	A minor	125
43.2	293	414	Courante	A minor	126
43.3	294	415	Bourrée	A minor	126
43.4	295	416	Sarabande	C major	129
43.5	297	417	Menuet	A minor	132
43.6	298	418	Menuet	A major	132
43.7	296	419	Presto	A minor	130

=== Sonata in A major, WeissSW 44 ===
WeissSW	Sm	Klima	Name	Key	D-Dl	F-PnII	CZ-Bm372	PL-Wu2003	A-ROI	I-VgcChilesotti	GB-HA	PL-WRu	PL-Wu2005	D-KNu	Bk	F-Sim	PL-Wu2008	PL-Wu2009
44.1	300		Prelude	A major	144													
44.2	301		Allemande	A major	145	14v	45	15r	29r	504.2	127		121		1			
44.3	302		Courante	A major	146	12v	46	15v	29v	504.3	127		122					
44.4	303		Bourrée	A major	146	13r	47	15r	30v	505.2	128	41		30r		17v		
44.5	304		Sarabande	A major	147	15r	45	16r	30r	505.1	128	42						
44.6	305		Menuet	A major	147	13r	47	15v	31r	504.4		42		30v			122	176
44.7	306		Gigue	A major	148	13v	48	16v	31v	505.2	129	43	123					
44.8	307		Gigue	A major	149													
44.9	554		Menuet	A major		11v												
44.10	556		Gavotte	A major		14r												

=== Sonata in A major, WeissSW 45 ===
WeissSW	Sm	Klima	Name	Key	D-Dl
45.1	308	386	Ouverture	A major	160
45.2	309	388	Courante	A major	162
45.3	310	389	Bourrée	A major	164
45.4	311	390	Sarabande	F♯ minor	165
45.5	313	391	Menuet	A major	168
45.6	312	392	Presto	A major	166

=== Sonata in A major, WeissSW 46 ===
WeissSW	Sm	Klima	Name	Key	D-Dl
46.1	314	7,334	Ouverture	A major	169
46.2	315	9,336	Courante	A major	172
46.3	316	10,337	Bourrée	A major	174
46.4	317	11,338	Sarabande	F♯ minor	175
46.5	319	12,339	Menuet	A major	178
46.6	318	13,340	Presto	A major	176

=== Sonata in A major, WeissSW 47 ===
WeissSW	Sm	Klima	Name	Key	D-Dl	BWV 1025	D-Mbs	Bk	PL-WRu	PL-Wu2008	PL-Wu2009
47.1	320	381	Entrée	A major	181	2		4			
47.2	321	382	Courante	A major	182	3					
47.3	322	383	Rondeau	A major	184	4	40v				
47.4	323	384	Sarabande	A major	185	5					
47.5	325		Menuet	A major	188	6					
47.6	324	385	Allegro	A major	186	7					
47.7			Prelude	A major					37	118	170

=== Sonata in F♯ minor, WeissSW 48 ===
WeissSW	Sm	Klima	Name	Key	D-Dl	Bk
48.1	327	400	Allemande	F♯ minor	191	49
48.2	328	401	Courante	F♯ minor	192	
48.3	329	402	Bourrée	F♯ minor	194	
48.4	330	403	Sarabande	A major	195	
48.5	332	404	Menuet	F♯ minor	198	
48.6	331	405	Presto	F♯ minor	197	

=== Sonata in B♭ major, WeissSW 49 ===
WeissSW	Sm	Klima	Name	Key	D-Dl	PL-Wu2004	Bk
49.1	337	354	Allemande	B♭ major	209	22v	9
49.2	338	355	Courante	B♭ major	210	24r	
49.3	339	356	Bourrée	B♭ major	212	23r	
49.4	340	357	Sarabande	G minor	213	27v	
49.5	342	358	Menuet	B♭ major	216	28v	
49.6	341	359	Presto	B♭ major	214	25v	

=== Sonata in B♭ major, WeissSW 50 ===
WeissSW	Sm	Klima	Name	Key	D-Dl
50.1	343	407	Introduzzione	B♭ major	227
50.2	344	408	Courante	B♭ major	228
50.3	345	409	Bourrée	B♭ major	230
50.4	346	410	Sarabande	G minor	231
50.5	348	411	Menuet	B♭ major	234
50.6	347	412	Presto	B♭ major	232

=== Sonata in G minor, WeissSW 51 ===
WeissSW	Sm	Klima	Name	Key	D-Dl
51.1	351	348	Allemande	G minor	251
51.2	352	349	Courante	G minor	252
51.3	353	350	Bourrée	G minor	254
51.4	354	351	Polonaise	B♭ major	255
51.5	356	352	Menuet	G minor	258
51.6	355	353	Presto	G minor	256

=== Sonata in C minor, WeissSW 52 ===
WeissSW	Sm	Klima	Name	Key	D-Dl	A-Su	Bk
52.1	357	326	Ouverture	C minor	278		PG6
52.2	358	329	Courante	C minor	280		
52.3	359	330	Bourrée	C minor	282	11v	
52.4	360	331	Siciliana	E♭ major	284		
52.5	361	332	Menuet	C minor	285	11r	
52.6	362	333	Presto	C minor	286	12v	

=== Sonata in F major, WeissSW 53 ===
WeissSW	Sm	Klima	Name	Key	D-Dl
53.1			Largo	F major	VI/2
53.2			Allegro	F major	VI/3
53.3			Largo	D minor	VI/5
53.4			Allegro	F major	VI/6

=== Sonata in C major, WeissSW 54 ===
WeissSW	Sm	Klima	Name	Key	D-Dl
54.1			Andante	C major	VI/9
54.2			Allegro	C major	VI/10
54.3			Allegro	C minor	VI/11
54.4			Largo	A minor	VI/12
54.5			Menuet	C major	VI/14

=== Sonata in C minor, WeissSW 55 ===
WeissSW	Sm	Klima	Name	Key	D-Dl
55.1			Grave	C minor	VI/15
55.2			Presto	C minor	VI/16
55.3			Adagio	C major	VI/18
55.4			Vivace	C minor	VI/18

=== Sonata in B♭ major, WeissSW 56 ===
WeissSW	Sm	Klima	Name	Key	GB-Lbl30387	D-Dl
56.1			Adagio	B♭ major	25v	VI/19
56.2			Allegro	B♭ major	26v	VI/20
56.3			Grave	G minor	28v	VI/22
56.4			Allegro	B♭ major	29v	VI/22

=== Sonata in B♭ major, WeissSW 57 ===
WeissSW	Sm	Klima	Name	Key	D-Dl
57.1			Allegro	B♭ major	VI/24
57.2			Largo	G minor	VI/27
57.3			Allegro	B♭ major	VI/28

=== Sonata in D minor, WeissSW 58 ===
WeissSW	Sm	Klima	Name	Key	D-Dl
58.1			Largo	D minor	VI/32
58.2			Allegro	D minor	VI/33
58.3			Largo	F major	VI/35
58.4			Allegro	D minor	VI/37

=== Sonata in D major, WeissSW 59 ===
WeissSW	Sm	Klima	Name	Key	D-Dl
59.1			Entrée	D major	VI/40
59.2			Allegro	D major	VI/41
59.3			Andante	B minor	VI/43
59.4			Allegro	D major	VI/45

=== Sonata in A major, WeissSW 60 ===
WeissSW	Sm	Klima	Name	Key	D-Dl
60.1			Vivace	A major	VI/47
60.2			Allegro	A major	VI/48
60.3			Largo	F♯ minor	VI/49bis
60.4			Presto	A major	VI/51

=== Sonata in D minor, WeissSW 61 ===
WeissSW	Sm	Klima	Name	Key	F-PnII	A-ROII	A-ROI	D-ROu53.1A
61.1	548		Ouverture	D minor	8v			
61.2	549		Bourrée	D minor	9r			
61.3	550		Menuet	D minor	9v	34r		
61.4	551		Gigue	D minor	10r	35r	38r	
61.5	552		Menuet	D minor	10v			21v
61.6	553		Gigue	D minor	10v			
61.7			Sarabande	D minor		34v		

=== Sonata in F major, WeissSW 62 ===
WeissSW	Sm	Klima	Name	Key	F-PnII	A-ROII	A-Su	Bk
62.1	376		Ouverture	F major	18v	39v	46v	42
62.2	377		Courante	F major	19v	40v	47v	
62.3	560		Gavotte	F major	20r			
62.4	378		Galanteria	F major	20v	41v	48r	
62.5	561		Menuet	F major	21r			
62.6	562		Sarabande	F major	21v	45r		
62.7	563		Menuet	F major	21v			
62.8	564		Gigue	F major	22r			
62.9	379		Menuet	F major		42v	48v	
62.10	380		Gigue	F major			49r	
62.11			Sarabande	F major		42r		
62.12		94	Chaconne	F major		43v		

=== Sonata in D major, WeissSW 63 ===
WeissSW	Sm	Klima	Name	Key	F-PnII	A-ROII
63.1		30	Allemande	D major	15v	
63.2	557		Courante	D major	16r	21r
63.3	559		Bourrée	D major	17r	21v
63.4	558		Bourrée	D major	16v	21v
63.5			Sarabande	D major	16v	22r
63.6		34	Menuet	D major	17r	
63.7			Gigue	D major		22v

=== Sonata in G minor, WeissSW 64 ===
WeissSW	Sm	Klima	Name	Key	F-PnII
64.1			Allemande	G minor	25v
64.2	566		Courante	G minor	26r
64.3	567		Gavotte	G minor	26v
64.4	568		Menuet	G minor	26v

=== Sonata in G major, WeissSW 65 ===
WeissSW	Sm	Klima	Name	Key	A-Wn18761	A-ETgoëssV	D-Gs	Bk	D-Witt	PL-Wn396
65.1	389		Fantasia	G major	4r			55		
65.2	390		Allemande	G major	6v					
65.3	391		Courante	G major	7v		80v			
65.4	392		Sarabande	G major	8v					
65.5	393		Gigue	G major	9r					
65.6	394		Gavotte	G major	10r	22v				
65.7	395		Menuet	G major	10v	24v			XXXIV	179v

=== Sonata in A major, WeissSW 66 ===
WeissSW	Sm	Klima	Name	Key	A-Wn18761	PL-Wu2006	A-ROI	D-Witt	GB-HA
66.1	396		Prelude	A major	11r		52v		
66.2	397		Allemande	A major	13r				
66.3	398		Courante	A major	14r	24v			32
66.4	399		Gavotte	A major	15r				
66.5	400		Menuet	A major	15v	27r		CI	
66.6	401		Rondeau	A major	16r	27r		CII	
66.7	402		Gigue	A major	16v	27v	53v		
66.8	403		Menuet	A major	17v				
66.9	404		Menuet	A major	18r				

=== Sonata in C minor, WeissSW 67 ===
WeissSW	Sm	Klima	Name	Key	A-Wn18761	A-KR78	S-Ssmf2
67.1	405		Fantasia	C minor	18v		
67.2	406		Allemande	C minor	21v		
67.3	407		Courante	C minor	22v		
67.4	408		Sarabande	C minor	24v		
67.5	409		Bourrée	C minor	25v		
67.6	410		Gigue	C minor	26v		
67.7	411		Menuet	C minor	27v	47v	58v

=== Sonata in F♯ minor, WeissSW 68 ===
WeissSW	Sm	Klima	Name	Key	A-Wn18761
68.1	412		Fantasia	F♯ minor	28v
68.2	413		Allemande	F♯ minor	29v
68.3	414		Gigue	F♯ minor	30v

=== Sonata in B♭ major, WeissSW 69 ===
WeissSW	Sm	Klima	Name	Key	A-Su	B-Bc5	CZ-POm
69.1	365	273	Courante	B♭ major	16v		
69.2	366	275	Menuet	B♭ major	17v		
69.3	367	276	Aria	G minor	18r	No.189	
69.4	368	274	Bourrée	B♭ major	19v		38

=== Sonata in G major, WeissSW 70 ===
WeissSW	Sm	Klima	Name	Key	A-Su
70.1	369		Pastorale	G major	22v
70.2	370		Paysanne	G major	23v
70.3	371		Menuet	G major	24v
70.4	372		Gigue	G major	25r

=== Sonata in D major, WeissSW 71 ===
WeissSW	Sm	Klima	Name	Key	A-Su	D-KNu	D-RH879	D-ROu65.6
71.1	373	44	Allemande	D major	29r			
71.2	374	45	Fantasia	D major	28v		2v	
71.3		46,31	Courante	D major	28r			
71.4		47,32	Bourrée	D major	27r			
71.5	375	48	Menuet	D major	26v	27v		b.4

=== Sonata in A minor, WeissSW 72 ===
WeissSW	Sm	Klima	Name	Key	A-Su
72.1	381		Entrée	A minor	58r
72.2	382		Paysanne	A minor	58v
72.3	383		Gigue	A minor	58v
72.4	384		Menuet	A minor	59v

=== Sonata in B♭ major, WeissSW 73 ===
WeissSW	Sm	Klima	Name	Key	A-Su	A-ROI	CZ-Bm371	CZ-Pnm	Bk
73.1			Allemande	B♭ major	67v	62v	107	244	10
73.2			Bourrée	B♭ major	68r				
73.3			Presto	B♭ major	68v				

=== Sonata in C minor, WeissSW 74 ===
WeissSW	Sm	Klima	Name	Key	A-Su	D-ROu53.1A
74.1	385		Prelude	C minor	94r	
74.2	386		Courante	C minor	94v	62v
74.3	387		Gavotte	C minor	95v	
74.4	388		Menuet	C minor	96r	65v

=== Sonata in F major, WeissSW 75 ===
WeissSW	Sm	Klima	Name	Key	A-ROI	F-PnI
75.1	545		Fantasia	F major	1v	9v
75.2			Capriccio	F major	2v	
75.3	540		Fantasia	F major	3v	2v
75.4			Gigue	F major	4v	
75.5			Menuet	F major	1r	

=== Sonata in A minor, WeissSW 76 ===
WeissSW	Sm	Klima	Name	Key	A-ROI
76.1			Capriccio	A minor	5v
76.2			Allemande	A minor	6r
76.3			Courante	A minor	6v
76.4			Fantasia	A minor	7v
76.5			Gigue	A minor	8v

=== Sonata in B♭ major, WeissSW 77 ===
WeissSW	Sm	Klima	Name	Key	A-ROI
77.1			Allemande	B♭ major	9v
77.2			Courante	B♭ major	10v

=== Sonata in C major, WeissSW 78 ===
WeissSW	Sm	Klima	Name	Key	A-ROI
78.1 (L1)			Adagio	C major	21v
78.2 (L1)			Allegro	C major	22r
78.3 (L1)			Adagio	A minor	22v
78.4 (L1)			Gigue	C major	23v

=== Sonata in C minor, WeissSW 79 ===
WeissSW	Sm	Klima	Name	Key	A-ROI
79.1			Fantasia	C minor	33r
79.2		2	Courante	C minor	33v
79.3			Menuet	C minor	34r
79.4			Menuet	C minor	34r
79.5		6	Gigue	C minor	34v

=== Sonata in D minor, WeissSW 80 ===
WeissSW	Sm	Klima	Name	Key	A-ROI	A-SEI	CZ-PaRPI	D-Fschneider33	PL-Wu2008	D-KNu	CZ-Bm372
80.1			Prelude	D minor	35r						
80.2			Allemande	D minor	35v						
80.3			Courante	D minor	36r	5v	15v	34v	165		
80.4			Bourrée	D minor	36v						
80.5			Sarabande	D minor	36v						
80.6			Menuet	D minor	37r					5v	
80.7			Rigaudon	D minor	37v						19
80.8		198	Menuet	D minor	37v						
80.9			Gigue	D minor	38r						

=== Sonata in C major, WeissSW 81 ===
WeissSW	Sm	Klima	Name	Key	A-ROI	PL-Wu2003	PL-Wu2005	CZ-Pnm	GB-HA	RA-BAn	A-GÖI
81.1	506	168	Allemande	C major	49r	5v	8				
81.2	501	169	Courante	C major	49v	6v	10		175		6v
81.3			Menuet	C major	50v			262		110v	
81.4			Sarabande	C minor	50v						
81.5	570		Bourrée	C major				260			

=== Sonata in D minor, WeissSW 82 ===
WeissSW	Sm	Klima	Name	Key	A-ROI	F-PnI	Bk
82.1			Prelude	D minor	54r		
82.2	539		Fantasia	D minor	54v	1v	32
82.3			Allemande	D minor	55v		
82.4			Sarabande	D minor	56v		
82.5			Gigue	D minor	57r		

=== Sonata in B♭ major, WeissSW 83 ===
WeissSW	Sm	Klima	Name	Key	A-ROI	GB-HA	CZ-Pnm	PL-Wu2008	D-Witt	CZ-Bm371	D-ROu53.1A
83.1	500		Fuge	B♭ major	62r	159					
83.2			Allemande	B♭ major	62v						
83.3			Courante	B♭ major	63r	164	282	156	XCII	93	
83.4		141	Bourrée	B♭ major	63v						
83.5			Menuet	B♭ major	64r						
83.6			Gigue	B♭ major	64v						24v

=== Sonata in D minor, WeissSW 84 ===
WeissSW	Sm	Klima	Name	Key	D-ROu53.1A	F-PnII
84.1			Prelude	D minor	18v	
84.2			Allemande	D minor	19av	
84.3			Courante	D minor	19bv	
84.4			Sarabande	D minor	20v	
84.5			Menuet	D minor	21r	
84.6			Menuet	D minor	21v	10v
84.7			Bourrée	D minor	21v	
84.8			Gigue	D minor	22v	

=== Sonata in A minor, WeissSW 85 ===
WeissSW	Sm	Klima	Name	Key	D-ROu53.1A	D-Mbs	PL-Kj40633	CZ-PaRPI
85.1			Prelude	A minor	1v			
85.2			Entrée	A minor	2v			
85.3			Courante	A minor	3v			
85.4			Bourrée	A minor	4v			
85.5			Menuet	A minor	5r			
85.6			Gigue	A minor	5v	51r	21v	10v
85.7			Menuet	A minor	6r			
85.8			Rondeau	A minor	6v			
85.9			Furlana	A minor	7v			

=== Sonata in C major, WeissSW 86 ===
WeissSW	Sm	Klima	Name	Key	D-ROu53.1A	PL-Wu2004
86.1			Prelude	C major	8v	
86.2			Ouverture	C major	9v	
86.3			Air	C major	10v	
86.4			Menuet	C major	11r	
86.5			Gavotte	C major	11v	
86.6			Rigaudon	C major	12r	
86.7			Menuet	C major	12v	
86.8			Rondeau	C major	12v	
86.9			Sarabande	C major	13v	
86.10			Gigue	C major	14v	55v
86.11			Menuet	C major	15v	

=== Sonata in D minor, WeissSW 87 ===
WeissSW	Sm	Klima	Name	Key	A-ROII	I-VgcChilesotti	PL-WRu	A-KR156
87.1			Allemande	D minor	46v			
87.2			Courante	D minor	47v			
87.3			Gavotte	D minor	48v			
87.4			Menuet	D minor	49r	521.1	76	5v
87.5			Gigue	D minor	49v			

=== Sonata in C major, WeissSW 88 ===
WeissSW	Sm	Klima	Name	Key	PL-Wu2003	PL-Wu2005	A-ROII	A-ROI
88.1		168	Allemande	C major	5v			
88.2	507	170	Bourrée	C major	6r	9		
88.3	508	169	Courante	C major	6v			
88.4	509	171	Sarabande	C major	7v	12		
88.5	510	172	Menuet	C major	8r	12		
88.6		173	Menuet	C major	8r			
88.7	511	174	Allegro	C major	8v	14	35v	
88.8	512	175	Angloise	C major	9v			
88.9	513	176	Menuet	C major	10r	15		
88.10			Menuet	C major				50v

=== Sonata in A major, WeissSW 89 ===
WeissSW	Sm	Klima	Name	Key	PL-Wu2003	PL-Wu2005
89.1			Ouverture	A major	12v	
89.2	480		Allemande	A major	13r	
89.3	481		Courante	A major	13v	120

=== Sonata in D major, WeissSW 90 ===
WeissSW	Sm	Klima	Name	Key	PL-Wu2003	PL-Wu2004
90.1		157	Allemande	D major	34r	
90.2		158	Courante	D major	34v	
90.3		159	Gavotte	D major	35r	
90.4		160	Menuet	D major	35r	
90.5		163	Sarabande	D major	35v	
90.6		164	Bourrée	D major	35v	
90.7		161,429	Menuet	D major	36r	31v
90.8		165	Gigue	D major	36v	

=== Sonata in D major, WeissSW 91 ===
WeissSW	Sm	Klima	Name	Key	PL-Wu2003	PL-Wu2005	Bk
91.1	514	320	Prelude	D major	41v	84	
91.2		321	Capriccio	D major	42v	86	
91.3	515	322	Allemande	D major	43v	88	25
91.4	516	324	Menuet	D minor	44r	89	
91.5	517	323	Courante	D major	44v	90	
91.6	518	325	Presto	D major	45v	92	

=== Sonata in D major, WeissSW 92 ===
WeissSW	Sm	Klima	Name	Key	PL-Wu2004	I-VgcChilesotti	PL-WRu	RA-BAn	A-ETgoëssX	D-Mbs	CZ-POm	PL-Wu2003
92.1		426	Allemande	D major	29r	528.1						
92.2		427	Courante	D major	29v	528.2						
92.3		428	Allegro	D major	31r	484.2						
92.4		429,161	Menuet	D major	31v							
92.5		430	Polonaise	D major	32r				105v			
92.6		431	Bourrée	D major	32v	484.3		95v				35v
92.7		432	Menuet	D major	33r							
92.8		433	Allegro	D major	33v	509.2	9			34r	17	
92.9		434	Menuet	D major	34r	509.3	14					
92.10		435	Menuet	D major	34v							
92.11		436	Menuet	D major	35r							
92.12		437,154	Paysanne	D major	35v							

=== Sonata in D minor, WeissSW 93 ===
WeissSW	Sm	Klima	Name	Key	PL-Wu2008	PL-Wu2009	PL-Wu2010
93.1			Allemande	D minor	68	86	240
93.2		197	Gavotte	D minor	69		
93.3			Bourrée	D minor	70		
93.4			Menuet	D minor	71	94	243
93.5			Gigue	D minor	72	92	242
93.6			Rigaudon	D minor	73	96	244

=== Sonata in D minor, WeissSW 94 ===
WeissSW	Sm	Klima	Name	Key	RF-Mcm
94.1	427		Allegro	D minor	3v
94.2	428		Polonaise	D minor	4r
94.3	429		Courante	D minor	4v
94.4	430		Allegro	D minor	5r
94.5	431		Menuet	D minor	5v
94.6	432		Menuet	F major	5v

=== Sonata in G minor, WeissSW 95 ===
WeissSW	Sm	Klima	Name	Key	RF-Mcm
95.1	439		Andante	G minor	7v
95.2	440		Courante	G minor	7v
95.3	441		Gigue	G minor	8r
95.4	442		Paysanne	G minor	8v
95.5	443		Polonaise	G minor	8v

=== Sonata in G major, WeissSW 96 ===
WeissSW	Sm	Klima	Name	Key	RF-Mcm	D-Mbs	Bk
96.1	527		Prelude	G major		30r	50
96.2	445		Andante	G major	10v		
96.3	446		Courante	G major	10v		
96.4	447		Bourrée	G major	11r	28r	
96.5	448		Sarabande	G major	11r	29v	
96.6	449		Menuet	G major	11r	29r	

=== Sonata in F major, WeissSW 97 ===
WeissSW	Sm	Klima	Name	Key	RF-Mcm
97.1	455		Andante	F major	17v
97.2	456		Courante	F major	17v
97.3	457		Bourrée	F major	18r
97.4	458		Polonaise	F major	18r
97.5	459		Gigue	F major	18v

=== Sonata in D minor, WeissSW 98 ===
WeissSW	Sm	Klima	Name	Key	RF-Mcm
98.1	460		Vivace	D minor	19v
98.2	461		Courante	D minor	20v
98.3	464		Bourrée	D minor	22v
98.4	465		Andante	F major	23r
98.5	466		Presto	D minor	23v
98.6	467		Menuet	D minor	24v

=== Sonata in A major, WeissSW 99 ===
WeissSW	Sm	Klima	Name	Key	GB-HA	PL-Wu2003	D-Mbs
99.1	469		Allemande	A major	1		
99.2	470		Courante	A major	3	18v	
99.3	471		Bourrée	A major	5		63v
99.4	472		Menuet	A major	6		

=== Sonata in D major, WeissSW 100 ===
WeissSW	Sm	Klima	Name	Key	PL-WRu	GB-HA	PL-Wu2010	PL-Wu2003
100.1			Prelude	D major	114			
100.2	473		Allemande	D major	115	67		
100.3			Courante	D major	116	68	86	
100.4		166	Menuet	D major	118		85	37r

=== Sonata in G major, WeissSW 101 ===
WeissSW	Sm	Klima	Name	Key	GB-HA	Bk
101.1	475		Allemande	G major	85	52
101.2	476		Courante	G major	86	
101.3	477		Amoroso	G major	87	
101.4	478		Paysanne	G major	88	
101.5	479		Gigue	G major	89	

=== Sonata in G major, WeissSW 102 ===
WeissSW	Sm	Klima	Name	Key	GB-HA
102.1			Allemande	G major	90
102.2			Courante	G major	91
102.3	482		Presto	G major	92
102.4	483		Rondeau	G major	93
102.5	484		Bourrée	G major	95
102.6	485		Gigue	G major	96

=== Sonata in B♭ major, WeissSW 103 ===
WeissSW	Sm	Klima	Name	Key	GB-HA	US-NYp	I-VgcChilesotti	D-Mbs	Bk	D-ROu65.6	GB-Lbl31698
103.1	490		Allemande	B♭ major	142	11v	522.1		8		
103.2	491		Courante	B♭ major	143	12v	522.2				
103.3	492		Sarabande	B♭ major	144	14r	522.5				
103.4	493		Bourrée	B♭ major	144	13v	522.3	21r		l.1	37r
103.5	494		Gigue	B♭ major	145	14v	523.1				
103.6	495		Menuet	B♭ major	146	13v	522.4	20v			

=== Sonata in C major, WeissSW 104 ===
WeissSW	Sm	Klima	Name	Key	GB-HA	Bk
104.1	502		Allemande	C major	177	13
104.2	503		Courante	C major	177	
104.3			Bourrée	C major	178	
104.4	504		Gigue	C major	179	

=== Sonata in C major, WeissSW 105 ===
WeissSW	Sm	Klima	Name	Key	D-As
105.1			Allegro	C major	19.2r
105.2			Andante	A minor	19.4r
105.3			Menuet	C major	19.4v

=== Sonata in C major, WeissSW 106 ===
WeissSW	Sm	Klima	Name	Key	B-Bc27	Bk
106.1			Allemande	C major	4	13
106.2			Courante	C major	5	
106.3			Bourrée	C major	6	
106.4			Menuet	C major	7	
106.5			Sarabande	C major	8	
106.6			Gigue	C major	9	

=== Sonata in F major, WeissSW 107 ===
WeissSW	Sm	Klima	Name	Key	CZ-Bm371	A-ROII	A-GÖI	A-SEI	CZ-POm
107.1			Allemande	F major	113				
107.2			Courante	F major	114	15v	28v	58v	3
107.3			Menuet	F major	115				
107.4			Rigaudon	F major	115	16v	29r	60v	
107.5			Gigue	F major	117	18v	29v	59v	

=== Sonata in F major, WeissSW 108 ===
WeissSW	Sm	Klima	Name	Key	I-VgcChilesotti	CZ-Bm372	CZ-POm	Bk	F-PnII	D-Mbs	D-KNu
108.1			Allemande	F major	496.2			40			
108.2	535		Courante	F major	497.1	28	8				
108.3			Gavotte	F major	497.2						
108.4			Sarabande	F major	497.3	8					
108.5	547		Menuet	F major	498.1				7r		
108.6			Angloise	F major	489.3						
108.7			Menuet	F major	498.3						
108.8	531		Gigue	F major	498.4	30				50v	15v

=== Sonata in C major, WeissSW 109 ===
WeissSW	Sm	Klima	Name	Key	I-VgcChilesotti
109.1			Prelude	C major	462.4
109.2			Allemande	C major	463.1
109.3			Courante	C major	463.2
109.4			Sarabande	C major	463.3
109.5			Menuet	C major	463.4
109.6			Bourrée	C major	464.1
109.7			Gigue	C major	464.2

== Singular pieces from London ms. ==
WeissSW	Sm	Klima	Name	Key	GB-Lbl30387	PL-Wu2003	PL-Wu2005	A-ROI	PL-WRu	PL-Wu2008	RA-BAn	PL-Wu2009	PL-Wu2010	D-Dl
1*	29	124	Allegro	G major	19v									
2*	31		Courante	G major	20v									
3*	45		Bourrée	D minor	39v									
4*	54		Menuet	G major	46v									
5*	73		Largo	D minor	59r									
6*	74		Fuge	C major	59v									
7*	81		Fuge	D minor	65v						48v			
8*	82		Allemande	A minor	66v									
9*	83		Fantasia	C minor	67v									
10*	84	141	Menuet	B♭ major	68v			64r	51					
11*	110		Tombeau	E♭ minor	88v									
12*	111	175	Angloise	C major	89v	9v	16							
13*	112	173	Menuet	C major	90v	8r	12							
14*	126	197	Gavotte	D minor	100r					69		90	241	
15*	127	198	Menuet	D minor	100r			37v						
16*	158	239	Menuet	F major	121v				97					9
17*	200		Prelude	E♭ major	145v									
18*	201		Menuet	G major	146v									
19*	202		Menuet	G minor	146v									
20*	210		Tombeau	B♭ minor	150v									
21*	211	316	Prelude	C major	151v									
22*	212	317	Menuet	C major	152r									
23*	213	318	Gavotte	C major	152v									
24*	214	319	Fantasia	C major	153r									
25*	215	321	Capriccio	D major	153v									
26*	216		Menuet	D major	154v									
27*	217		Menuet	B minor	155r									
28*	218		Paysanne	D major	155v	31r	80							

== Other singular pieces ==
WeissSW	Sm	Klima	Name	Key	list of manuscripts
29*	261	341	Prelude	C major	D-Dl / 70
30*	326	399	Prelude	F♯ minor	D-Dl / 190
31*	333	115	Prelude	B♭ major	D-Dl / 201
32*	349	243	Prelude	G minor	D-Dl / 243
33*	363	301	Prelude	E♭ major	D-Dl / 288
34*			Gigue	C minor	D-ROu53.1A / 45v
35*	546		Bourrée	F major	F-PnII / 6v
36*	519		Menuet	C major	F-PnII / 12r, D-Mbs / 3v
37*	555		Bourrée	C major	F-PnII / 12r, CZ-Pnm / 213
38*	565		Menuet	F major	F-PnII / 22r, D-ROu65.6 / k.3
39*	569		Prelude	F major	F-PnII / 29r
40*			Marche	C minor	A-ROI / 11v
41*			Allemande	D minor	A-ROI / 38v
42*			Capriccio	F major	A-ROI / 45r
43*			Prelude	D minor	A-ROI / 57v
44*	541		Fantasia	C major	F-PnI / 3v, Bk / 14
45*	542		Capriccio	G minor	F-PnI / 4v
46*	543		Fantasia	G major	F-PnI / 5v, Bk / 51
47*	544		Fantasia	D major	F-PnI / 6v
48*	474		Fuge	D major	F-PnI / 8v, GB-HA / 75
49*			Fuge	A major	PL-Wu2003 / 17v, PL-Wu2005 / 124, Bk / PG1a
50*			Prelude	B♭ major	PL-Wu2003 / 82v, PL-Wu2005 / 148
51*	571		Prelude	D minor	PL-Wu2004 / 1r
52*	572		Prelude	F major	PL-Wu2004 / 4v
53*			Prelude	D minor	PL-Wu2008 / 170
54*			Prelude	G major	PL-Wu2008 / 172
55*	415	126	Fantasia	B♭ major	CZ-Bm371 / 88, CZ-Pnm / 278, D-ROu52.2 / 84v
56*			Prelude	F major	CZ-POm / 1
57*	532		Gigue	F major	CZ-POm / 2, D-ROu53.1A / 30v
58*	533		Bourrée	F major	CZ-POm / 4, CZ-Pnm / 266, D-ROu53.1B / 15v
59*	536		Courante	G major	CZ-POm / 12
60*	537		Gigue	A major	CZ-POm / 16
61*			Prelude	D major	CZ-POm / 28
62*			Prelude	D minor	CZ-POm / 29
63*			Prelude	D minor	CZ-POm / 30, PL-Wu2008 / 4, PL-Wu2009 / 4, PL-WRu / 75
64*	538		Prelude	C major	CZ-POm / 32
65*			Prelude	C minor	CZ-POm / 33
66*	436		Allegro	A minor	RF-Mcm / 6v
67*	444		Courante	D major	RF-Mcm / 9v
68*	451		Prelude	D minor	RF-Mcm / 12r
69*	452		Galanteria	F minor	RF-Mcm / 14r
70*	454		Presto	B♭ major	RF-Mcm / 16v
71*	462		Prelude	G minor	RF-Mcm / 21v
72*	463		Courante	G minor	RF-Mcm / 21v
73*	468		Alternatim	D minor	RF-Mcm / 25r, PL-Wu2003 / 30v, PL-Wu2005 / 44
74*	520		Menuet	D minor	D-Mbs / 10v, F-Sim / 5r
75*	521		Gigue	A minor	D-Mbs / 13r
76*	522		Allemande	F minor	D-Mbs / 26v, Bk / 47
77*		34	Menuet	D major	D-Mbs / 32v
78*	528		Menuet	D major	D-Mbs / 32v
79*	529		Canarie	A major	D-Mbs / 37v
80*	530		Menuet	C major	D-Mbs / 49v
81*	486		Courante	G major	GB-HA / 103
82*	487		Courante	G major	GB-HA / 109
83*	488		Gavotte	G major	GB-HA / 110
84*	489		Sarabande	E minor	GB-HA / 126
85*	577		Courante	D minor	D-KNu / 6v, B-Bc15 / 13, D-LEmRosani / 9
86*			Entrée	F major	I-VgcChilesotti / 488.1, Bk / 44
87*			Courante	F major	I-VgcChilesotti / 491.2

== WeissSW Appendix ==
WeissSW	Sm	Klima	Name	Key	list of manuscripts
App 1.1			Allemande	A major	A-ROI / 25v
App 1.2			Courante	A major	A-ROI / 25v
App 1.3			Sarabande	A major	A-ROI / 26r
App 1.4			Bourrée	A major	A-ROI / 26r
App 1.5			Menuet	A major	A-ROI / 26r
App 1.6			Gigue	A major	A-ROI / 26v
App 2			Prelude	D major	PL-WRu / 8
App 3			Prelude	F major	D-ROu65.6 / a.1r
App 4			Fuge	D minor	RA-BAn / 48v
App 5			Aria	B♭ major	RA-BAn / 93v
App 6	434		Menuet	D major	RF-Mcm / 6r
App 7	435		Bourrée	D minor	RF-Mcm / 6v
App 8	437		Polonaise	F major	RF-Mcm / 7r
App 9	438		Polonaise	F major	RF-Mcm / 7r
App 10	453		Duetto	G major	RF-Mcm / 15v,16r
App 11	578		Aria	D minor	D-KNu / 7v, B-Bc15 / 18, PL-Wu2010 / 250, RA-BAn / 85v, I-VgcChilesotti / 474
App 12	579		Favorita	D major	D-KNu / 24v
App 13			Menuet	B♭ major	I-VgcChilesotti / 487.3, CZ-Pnm / 284
App 14			Fantasia	B♭ major	A-Wn18829 / 1r
App 15			Prelude	F major	A-Wn18829 / 27v
App 16			Prelude	D minor	PL-Wu2009 / 4, PL-Wu2008 / 4, PL-WRu / 75
App 17			Allemande	D major	F-Sim / 22v
App 18			Ouverture	D minor	A-ROII / 32v
App 19			Sarabande	F major	A-ROII / 45r
App 20			Sarabande	D major	F-PnII / 16v

== Other pieces ==
Sm	Name	Key	list of manuscripts
416	Concerto	B♭ major	A-Wn18829 / 2v, A-GÖI / 54v, CZ-Bm372 / 34, NL-DHgm50536 / 63v
417	Menuet	B♭ major	A-Wn18829 / 4v, A-GÖI / 57r, CZ-Bm371 / 109, CZ-POm / 8, NL-DHgm50536 / 65v, PL-WRu / 57
418	Courante	B♭ major	A-Wn18829 / 5v, A-GÖI / 56r, CZ-Bm372 / 36, NL-DHgm50536 / 65r, A-SEI / 25v, PL-WRu / 56
419	Polonaise	B♭ major	A-Wn18829 / 6v, NL-DHgm50536 / 65v
420	Gigue	B♭ major	A-Wn18829 / 6v, A-GÖI / 57v, CZ-Bm372 / 37, GB-HA / 157, NL-DHgm50536 / 65r, CZ-POm / 5
422	Concerto	D major	A-Wn18829 / 32v
425	Bourrée	B♭ major	A-GÖI / 56v
426	Gigue	B♭ major	A-SEI / 26v
433	Paysanne	F major	RF-Mcm / 5v
496	Bourrée	B♭ major	GB-HA / 146, B-Br4087 / F1/3v
497	Allegro	B♭ major	GB-HA / 147, CZ-POm / 10, B-Br4087 / F1/2v
498	Aria	B♭ major	GB-HA / 148, B-Br4087 / F1/4r
499	Rondeau	B♭ major	GB-HA / 149, B-Br4087 / F1/4r, D-ROu53.1A / 26v, D-ROu53.1B / 27r
505	Rondeau	C major	GB-HA / 181
575	Conclude	A major	PL-Wu2004 / 12v
	Menuet	B♭ major	D-Dl / 208
	Menuet	D major	A-Wn18829 / 38v
	Sarabande	F♯ minor	PL-Wu2003 / 12r
	Allegro	A major	PL-Wu2003 / 12v
	Sarabande	F♯ minor	PL-Wu2003 / 14r
	Menuet	A major	PL-Wu2003 / 19v, PL-Wu2005 / 126
	Menuet	A major	PL-Wu2003 / 20r, PL-Wu2005 / 127
	Menuet	D major	PL-Wu2003 / 39r, PL-Wu2005 / 82, PL-Wu8135 / 12r
	Menuet	D minor	PL-Wu2003 / 39r, PL-Wu2005 / 82, PL-Wu8135 / 12v
	Entrée	C minor	PL-Wu2003 / 81v, PL-Wu2005 / 144
	Allemande	C minor	PL-Wu2003 / 83r, PL-Wu2005 / 149
	Fuge	C minor	PL-Wu2003 / 83v, PL-Wu2005 / 146
	Allemande	B minor	PL-WRu / 129
	Courante	B minor	PL-WRu / 130
	Bourrée	B minor	PL-WRu / 130
	Sarabande	B minor	PL-WRu / 131
	Menuet	B minor	PL-WRu / 132
	Gigue	B minor	PL-WRu / 132
	Paysanne	A major	PL-WRu / 44
	Courante	B♭ major	CZ-Bm371 / 108, CZ-Pnm / 246
	Bourrée	B♭ major	CZ-Bm371 / 110, CZ-Pnm / 242
	Allegro	B♭ major	CZ-Bm371 / 111, CZ-Pnm / 248, PL-WRu / 54
	Fantasia	B♭ major	B-Br4087 / F4/1, Bk / 6
	Andante	G minor	B-Br4089 / F14, Bk / 58
	Allemande	B♭ major	A-ROI / 40r
	Courante	B♭ major	A-ROI / 40v
	Gavotte	B♭ major	A-ROI / 40v
	Sarabande	B♭ major	A-ROI / 41r
	Menuet	B♭ major	A-ROI / 41v
	Menuet	G minor	A-ROI / 41v
	Rondeau	B♭ major	A-ROI / 42r
	Adagio	G major	A-ROI / 43r
	Gavotte	G major	A-ROI / 43r
	Aria	G major	A-ROI / 43v
	Menuet	G major	A-ROI / 43v
	Menuet	G minor	A-ROI / 44r
	Gigue	G major	A-ROI / 44v
	Fuge	F major	A-ROI / 45v
	Courante	F major	A-ROI / 46v
	Rigaudon	F major	A-ROI / 47r
	Sarabande	F major	A-ROI / 47r
	Menuet	F major	A-ROI / 47v
	Menuet	F major	A-ROI / 47v
	Gigue	F major	A-ROI / 48r
	Courante	F major	D-ROu53.1A / 41v
	Allegro	C major	CZ-POm / 36
424	Allemande	B♭ major	A-GÖI / 55v, A-SEI / 24v
	Concerto	B♭ major	S-SK / 1v
	Largo	B♭ major	S-SK / 2v
	Vivace	B♭ major	S-SK / 3r
