= Ivan Stepanovsky =

Ukrainian lutenist

Ivan Stepanovsky Іван Степановський
- Born: c. 1710
- Died: Saint Petersburg, Russian Empire
- Occupations: Lutenist; Court musician
- Instrument: Lute

Ivan Stepanovsky (Note: Ukrainian: Іван Степановський, romanized: Ivan Stepanovskyi) (born c. 1710) was a Ukrainian lutenist.

== Biography ==
Stepanovsky was born in c. 1710. In the 1740s, he studied lute with Sylvius Leopold Weiss in Dresden. He served as a lutenist by the courts of prince-elector Augustus II the Strong (Dresden), Polish King (Warsaw). Since 1746 was a court musician in Saint Petersburg, where he died.
