= Ernst Gottlieb Baron =

German lutenist, composer and writer on music (1696–1760)

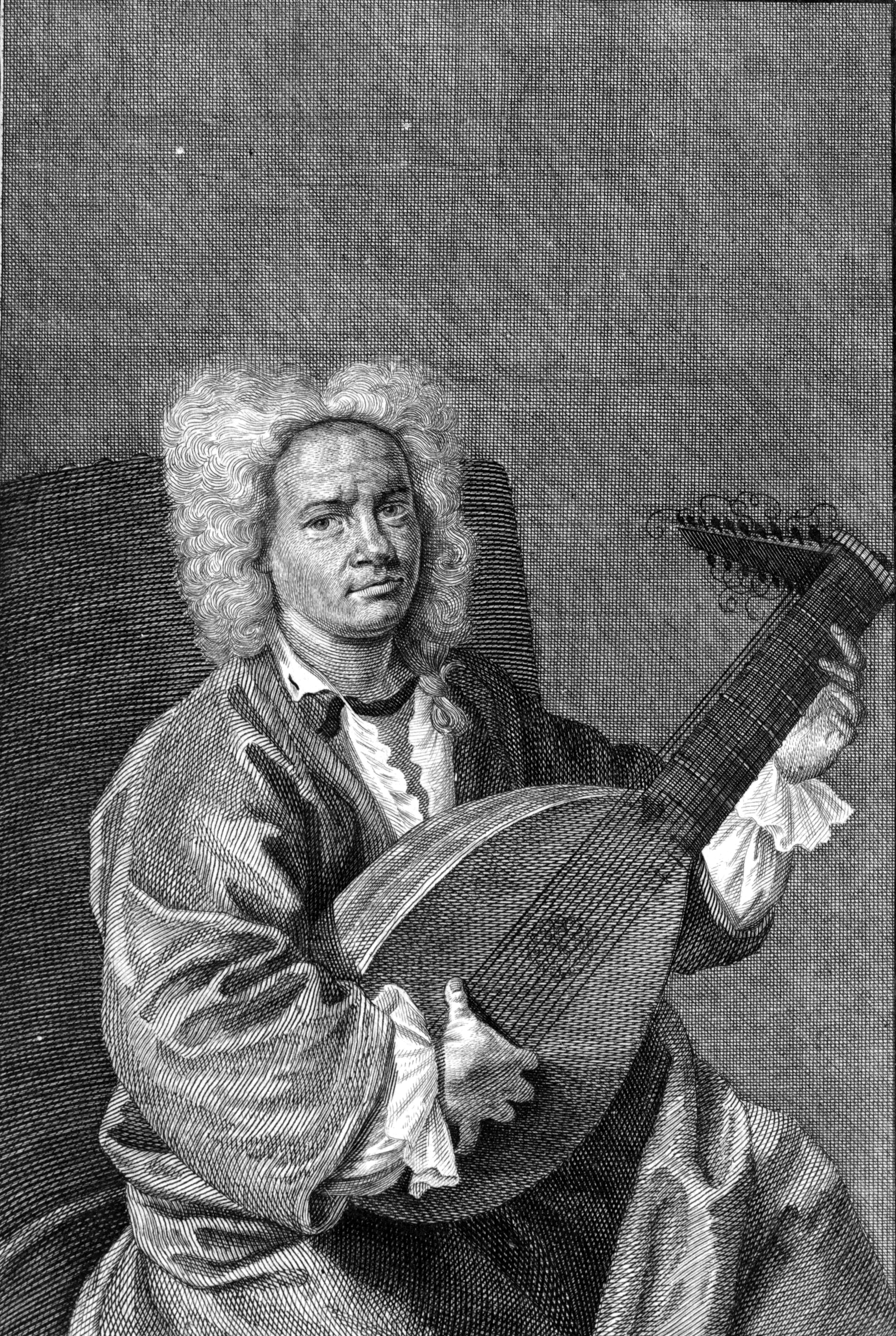
Ernst Gottlieb Baron

Ernst Gottlieb Baron or Ernst Theofil Baron (17 February 1696 – 12 April 1760), was a German lutenist, composer and writer on music.

Baron was born in Breslau into the family of Michael Baron, a maker of gold lace who expected his son to follow in his footsteps. Baron showed an inclination to music from an early age, and later made it his profession. He studied lute from about 1710 with a Bohemian named Kohott. He attended the Elisabeth Gymnasium in Breslau, and from 1715 the University of Leipzig, where he studied philosophy and law.

He spent the period from 1719 to 1728 in travels from one small court to another. He visited Halle, Köthen, Schleiz, Saalfeld and Rudolstadt, arriving in Jena in 1720 and remaining for two years. Later he travelled to Kassel, Fulda, Würzburg, Nuremberg and Regensburg, returning in 1727 to Nuremberg where he published his "Historisch-theoretische und practische Untersuchung des Instruments der Lauten", the work for which he is principally remembered. In 1728 he replaced the lutenist Meusel, who had recently died in a horseback riding accident, at the court of Gotha. He held that post for four years. After the death of the Duke of Gotha he moved on to Eisenach.

In 1737 he visited Merseburg, Köthen and Zerbst, and eventually joined the musical ensemble of Crown Prince Frederick of Prussia as a theorbist. He was immediately granted permission to go to Dresden to purchase a theorbo. In Dresden he received tuition from the lutenists Sylvius Leopold Weiss and I.A. Hofer.

After Frederick's accession in 1740, Baron continued to serve as theorbist in the royal musical establishment, and remained at this post until his death in Berlin.

== Writings ==
Baron’s Untersuchung is a valuable source of information about lutenists and lute playing in the late Baroque era. It is divided into two main parts. The first deals with the history of the lute, and contains important references to contemporary players. The second is devoted to the practice of the instrument.

Baron’s other writings, currently incompletely studied, supplement the Untersuchung, and explore other subjects.

- Historisch-theoretische und practische Untersuchung des Instruments der Lauten (Nuremberg, 1727/R)
- "Herrn Barons Fortsetzung seiner in dem Waltherischen Lexico befindlichen Lebensumstände", in F.W. Marpurg: Historisch-kritische Beyträge zur Aufnahme der Musik, i (Berlin, 1755/R), 544–6
- Herrn Ernst Gottlieb Barons Beytrag zur historisch- theoretisch- und practischen Untersuchung der Laute, ii (Berlin, 1756/R), 65–83
- Herrn Barons Abhandlung von dem Notensystem der Laute und der Theorbe, 119–23
- Herrn Barons zufällige Gedanken über verschiedene musikalische Materien, 124–44
- Abriss einer Abhandlung von der Melodie: Eine Materie der Zeit (Berlin, 1756)
- Versuch über das Schöne (Altenburg, 1757)

== Works ==
- Suite, D, lute, in G. Telemann: Der getreue Musikmeister (Hamburg, 1728)
- Fantasie, lute, in F. Seidel: 12 Menuette für die Laute von Herrn F. Seidel, samt einer Fantasie von Herrn Baron (Leipzig, 1757/R1969)
- 2 concertos, C, lute, vn, bc; duet, G, lute, fl: B-Bc
- 6 partitas, lute; 6 trios, lute, va, vc; sonata, 2 lutes: D-LEbh; ed. L. Sayce (n.p., 1998)
- Partie, A, lute, Bsb
- Sonata, 2 lutes, fl, LEm
- Suite movements, lute, Dl, ROu, RUS-KA

== Bibliography ==
- J. Mattheson: Der neue göttingische, aber viel schlechter, als die alten lacedämonischen urtheilende Ephorus (Hamburg, 1727), 109–27
- F.W. Marpurg: Legende einiger Musikheiligen (Cologne [recte Breslau], 1786), 158–64
- A. Koczirz: ‘Verschollene neudeutsche Lautenisten’, AMw, iii (1921), 270–84
- H. Neemann: ‘Philipp Martin, ein vergessener Lautenist’, ZMw, ix (1926–7), 545–65
- H.-P. Kosack: Geschichte der Laute und Lautenmusik in Preussen (Kassel, 1935)
- D.A. Smith: ‘Baron and Weiss contra Mattheson: in Defence of the Lute’, JLSA, vi (1973), 48–62
- J. Klima: Ernst Gottlieb Baron, 1696–1760: Partiten aus den verschollenen Handschriften Berlin Mus. ms. 40633 und Königsberg 3026: Themenverzeichnis (Enzersdorf, 1976)
