= Martin Štěpanovský =

Czech footballer

Personal information
- Full name: Martin Štěpanovský
- Date of birth: 17 July 1988 (age 38)
- Place of birth: Czech Republic
- Height: 1.87 m (6 ft 2 in)
- Position: Goalkeeper

Team information
- Current team: SK Hvozdnice
- Number: 1

Senior career*
Years	Team	Apps	(Gls)
2007–2010	FC Vysočina Jihlava	4	(0)
2012–2013	FK Bohemians Prague (Střížkov)	17	(0)
2015–2016	FK Slavoj Vyšehrad	17	(0)
2016	MFK Frýdek-Místek	1	(0)
2017	1. SC Znojmo	4	(0)
2018	FK TJ Štěchovice	9	(0)
2018-	SK Hvozdnice		
- * Club domestic league appearances and goals

Martin Štěpanovský (born 17 July 1988) is a Czech footballer. He plays goalkeeper for SK Hvozdnice. He has played for many teams over his career. Over those ten years, he has appeared in at least fifty-four games, for a total of more than 4800 minutes. In that time he has had fourteen clean sheets, conceded eighty-four goals, and received two yellow cards.
