= 1711 imperial election =

Holy Roman Emperor election

- 12 October 1711

9 Prince-electors 5 votes needed to win
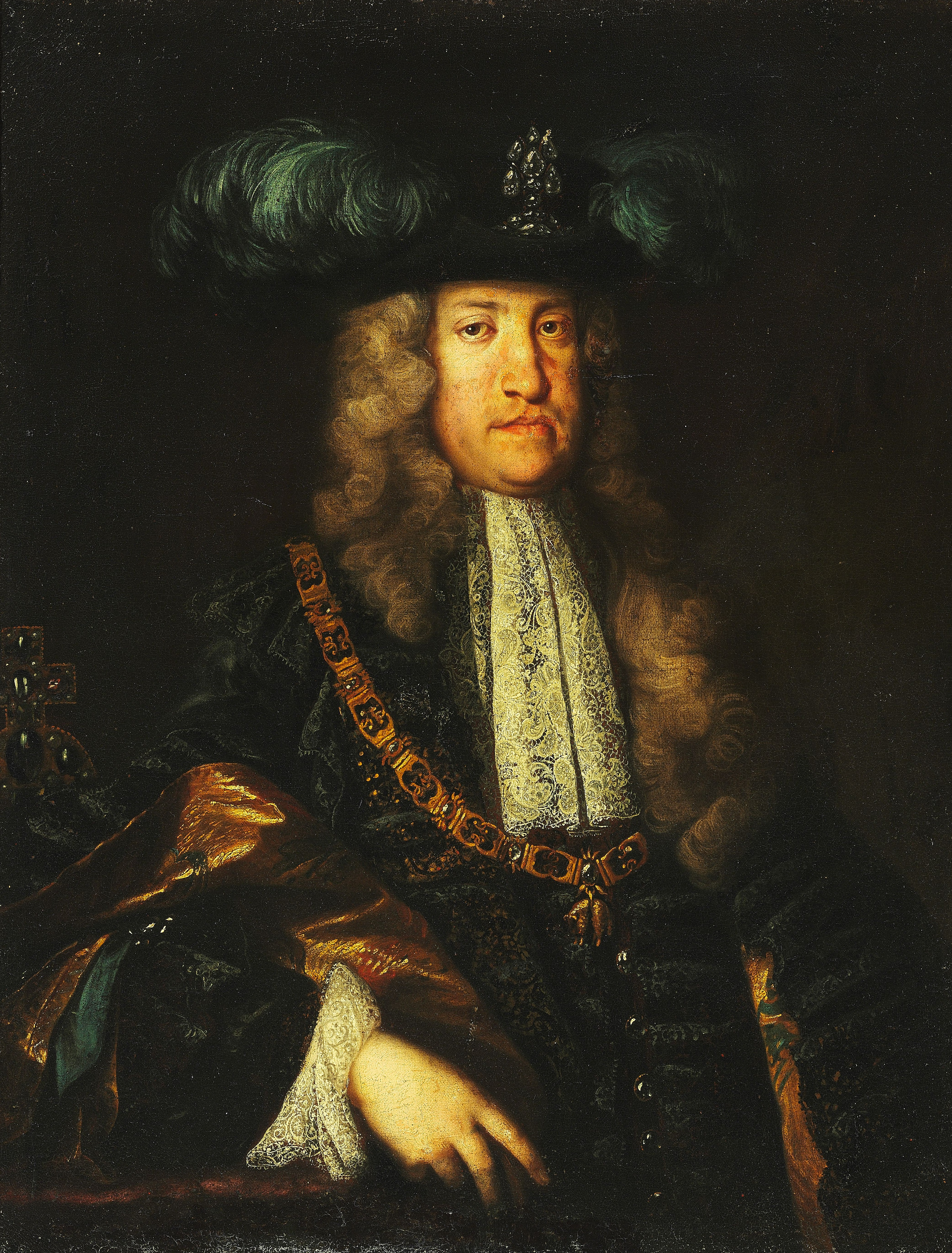
Candidate	Charles VI
House	Habsburg
Electoral vote	9
Percentage	100%
Emperor before election
Joseph I
House of Habsburg
Elected Emperor
Charles VI
House of Habsburg

The imperial election of 1711 was an imperial election held to select the emperor of the Holy Roman Empire. It took place on October 12.

== Background ==
On December 17, 1692, Leopold I, Holy Roman Emperor created the Electorate of Hanover and the Lutheran Ernest Augustus, Elector of Hanover, prince of Calenberg, duke of Brunswick-Lüneburg and prince-bishop of Osnabrück its prince-elector. The Imperial Diet did not immediately ratify his choice. Ernest Augustus would die on January 23, 1698 and be succeeded by his son who later became George I of Great Britain.

In 1697, Frederick Augustus I, elector of Saxony, converted from Lutheranism to Catholicism as a prerequisite in his campaign to be elected king of the Polish–Lithuanian Commonwealth. However, Lutheranism remained the state church of Saxony.

=== War of the Spanish Succession ===
On October 3, 1700, weeks before his death, the childless and severely disabled Charles II of Spain recognized as heir to the entire Spanish Empire the French prince Philippe, Duke of Anjou, his sister's grandson and the grandson of King Louis XIV of France. The possession by the House of Bourbon of both the French and Spanish thrones threatened the balance of power in Europe. England, Austria, and the Dutch Republic, fearing this threat, resurrected the Grand Alliance in support of the claim of the fifteen-year-old Charles, Emperor Leopold's younger son. Leopold had married another sister of Charles II in 1666, and in 1685 their daughter had surrendered her right to the Spanish throne to Charles, who was Leopold's son from a later marriage. The first hostilities of the War of the Spanish Succession broke out in June 1701. The Grand Alliance declared war on France in May 1702.

That same year, Maximilian II Emanuel, Elector of Bavaria, and his brother Joseph Clemens of Bavaria, the elector of Cologne, joined France in support of Philip's claim to the Spanish succession. They were quickly forced into flight and were deprived of their electorates by the Imperial Diet in 1706.

In 1708, to compensate for the absence of the electors of Bavaria and Cologne, the Imperial Diet ratified the admission of Brunswick-Lüneburg to the Electoral College and called for the king of Bohemia to join the proceedings, from which he and his predecessors had abstained in the elections of 1653, 1658 and 1690.

=== Election of 1711 ===
Joseph I, Holy Roman Emperor died of smallpox on April 17, 1711. The prince-electors called to elect his successor were:

- Lothar Franz von Schönborn, elector of Mainz
- Charles Joseph of Lorraine, elector of Trier
- Charles II, King of Bohemia
- Johann Wilhelm, Elector Palatine, elector of the Electoral Palatinate
- Frederick Augustus I, elector of Saxony
- Frederick I of Prussia, elector of Brandenburg
- George, elector of Hanover, later King George I of Great Britain

Of these, the electors of Brandenburg and Hanover were the sole Protestants.

== Aftermath ==
The 1711 imperial election marked the accession of Charles VI as Holy Roman Emperor following the death of his elder brother, Emperor Joseph I. Charles VI inherited a complex and fragile empire amid the ongoing War of the Spanish Succession, striving to maintain Habsburg dominance in Europe.

Charles VI sought to consolidate his position by enforcing the Pragmatic Sanction of 1713, which aimed to secure the succession rights of his daughter, Maria Theresa. His reign faced both internal and external challenges but established the groundwork for Habsburg control that persisted throughout the 18th century.
