= Silvius Leopold Weiss =

German composer and lutenist

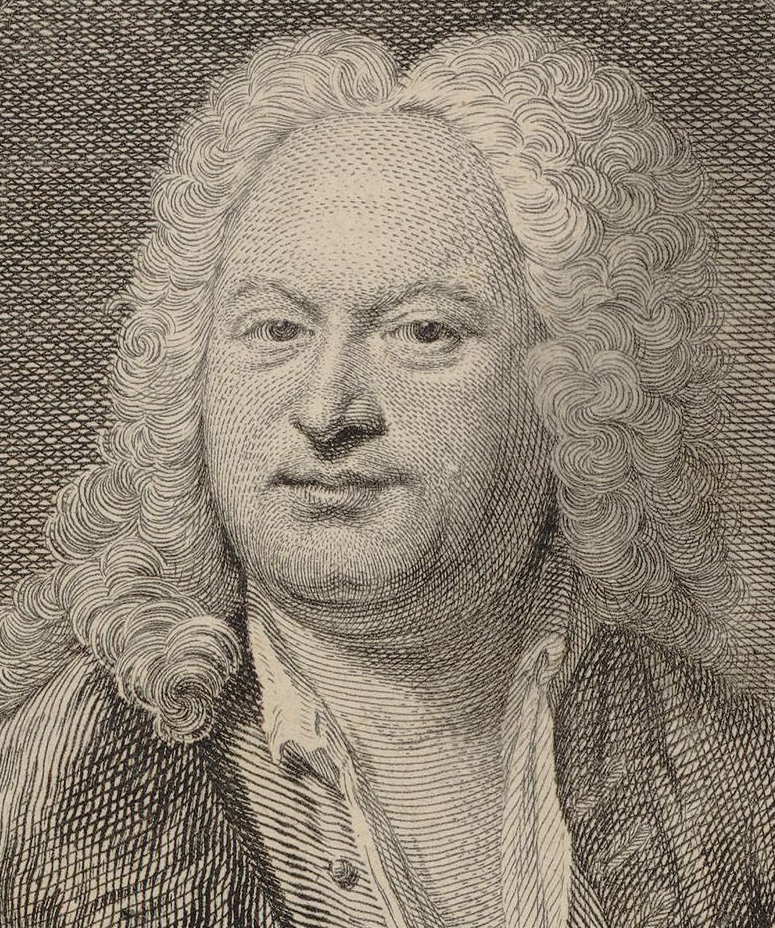
Silvius Leopold Weiss

Silvius Leopold Weiss (Note: Variant forms for the last name include Weiß, Weis, Weisse, Weise, Vais, Veis, and Veys; the first name is also written as Sylvius or Silvio, the middle name as Leopoldus or Leopoldo.) (12 October 1687 – 16 October 1750) was a German composer and lutenist. He was born in Silesia (in present-day Poland) to the lutenist Johann Jacob Weiss, who taught the lute to his children. Weiss was a child prodigy and played for Leopold I, Holy Roman Emperor c. 1694. He was employed by nobility including Charles III Philip of Palatinate-Neuburg and Alexander Sobieski, travelling with them to various courts and cities in Europe.

From 1718, Weiss was a musician at the Dresden court of Augustus the Strong, the Elector of Saxony and King of Poland. He played the lute and the theorbo on many occasions. He was acquainted with Johann Sebastian Bach, who frequently visited Dresden, and on occasion they played music together, reportedly competing in playing fantasias and fugues. Bach's trio in A major for violin and harpsichord BWV 1025 is based on a sonata by Weiss.

At the time of his death, Weiss was the highest-paid instrumentalist at the Dresden court. He left the largest known corpus of music for lute and is recognised as one of the greatest lutenists of all time.

== Early life and travels ==
Silvius Leopold Weiss was born on 12 October 1687. (Note: Numerous sources claim a birth year of 1686, following an engraving by Folin, but a contemporary encyclopaedia entry by Luise Gottsched and some primary sources support 1687. However, no baptism registry entry is known.) His birthplace was probably Grottkau (now Grodków, Poland) in the Duchy of Neisse (Nysa), a territory ruled by the Prince-Bishop of Breslau, who was also the Prince of Neisse and Duke of Grottkau. It is also possible that he was born in Breslau (Wrocław), where his sister Juliana Margaretha was baptised in the Lutheran St. Elizabeth's Church in 1690. His parents were Johann Jacob Weiss, a lutenist, and Anna Margaretha, whose last name is not known. Silvius, Juliana and their younger brother Johann Sigismund Weiss learned to play the lute from their father. The family was likely Protestant.

Very little is known about Weiss's early life. He was a child prodigy, however, and performed for Leopold I, Holy Roman Emperor in the seventh year of his life, probably in 1694. At some point before 1706, he entered the service of Charles III Philip of Palatinate-Neuburg, who resided in Breslau and in nearby Brieg (Brzeg). In 1706, he travelled first to Berlin and then to Kassel and Kleve with the retinue of Frederick I, heir apparent of Hesse-Kassel. For the month of April, he stayed at the court of Johann Wilhelm, Elector Palatine, the brother of Charles III Philip, in Düsseldorf, and wrote his earliest known composition, Sonata 7 in C minor. On his return to Breslau, Johann wrote to his brother, thanking him for the opportunity to listen to the virtuoso lutenist and expressing his pleasure and contentment.

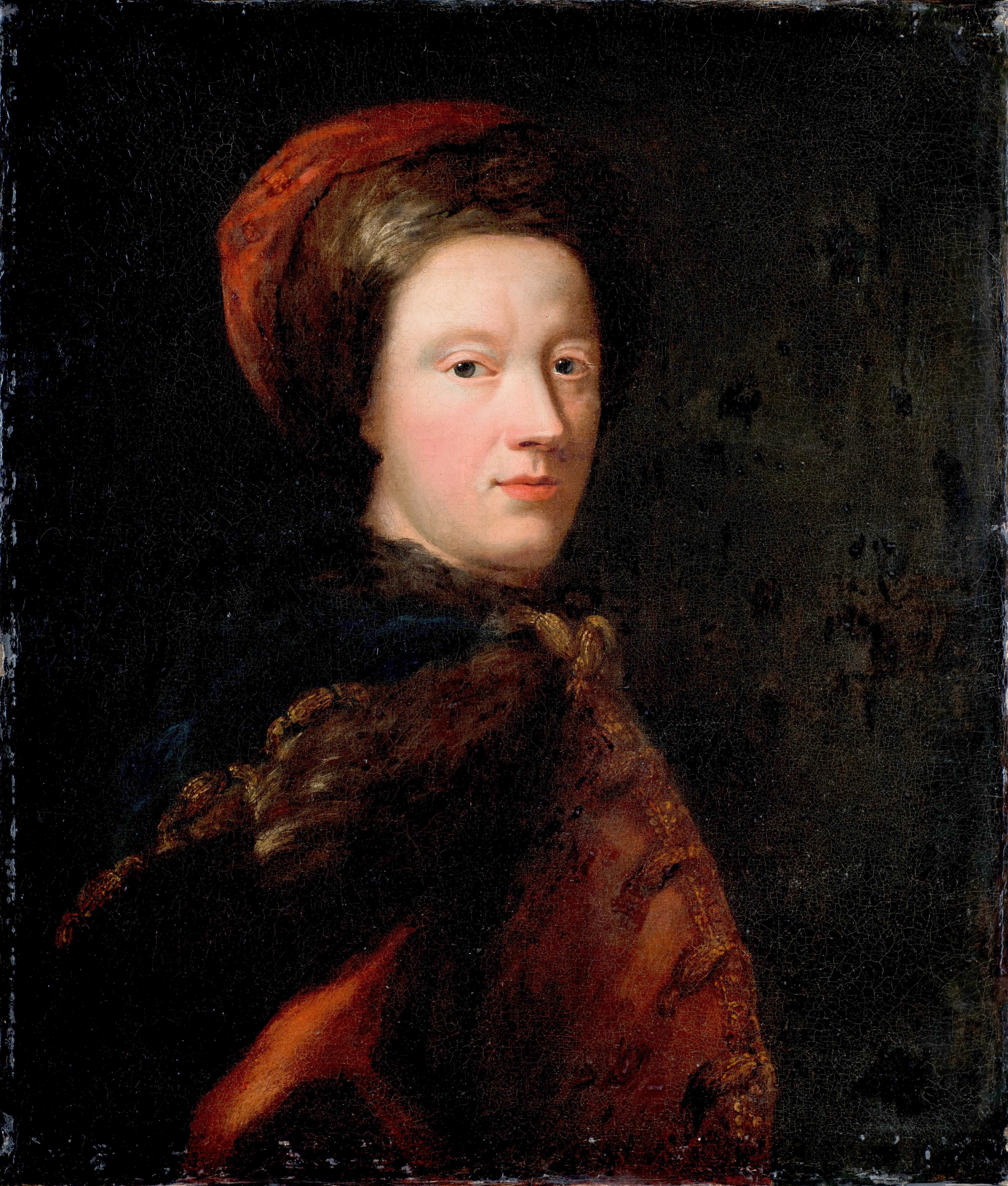
Alexander Sobieski painted by Jan Kupecký

It is not known where Weiss spent the time between 1707, when his employer Charles III Philip moved to Innsbruck, and 1710. In that year, he travelled to Rome together with the Polish prince Alexander Sobieski; it is possible that Weiss worked for Sobieski already since 1708. The prince, who was related to the Neuburg family by marriage, had been regularly visiting Rome, where his mother Queen Marie Casimire was living at Palazzo Zuccari. Circumstantial evidence (manuscript copies of parts of the opera in the hand of Weiss) suggests that Weiss participated in the premiere of Tolomeo e Alessandro, an opera by Domenico Scarlatti written for the queen. As the prince had directed his records to be burned after his death in 1714, it is unknown what exactly the duties of Weiss were, but he probably performed in various operas at the palazzo, taught the lute to the prince and his niece and very likely was a chamber musician for the Sobieskis.

By 1712, Weiss was married to an Italian woman named Maria Angela. They lived close by, in an apartment in a house that is now in 36 Via Francesco Crispi. As the parish registers indicate that Weiss received communion, he must have been Catholic at the time; he may have converted during his time in Rome. Alexander Sobieski died in November 1714, a few months after his mother had left Rome. Some time before 1718, Weiss returned to the service of Charles III Philip, probably at the latter's Innsbruck court. Weiss visited Prague in 1717 and again in 1718/19; he probably visited the luthier Thomas Edlinger who built the thirteen-course lutes that Weiss had invented. From 1719, Weiss wrote music for thirteen-course lutes.

== Court musician in Dresden ==
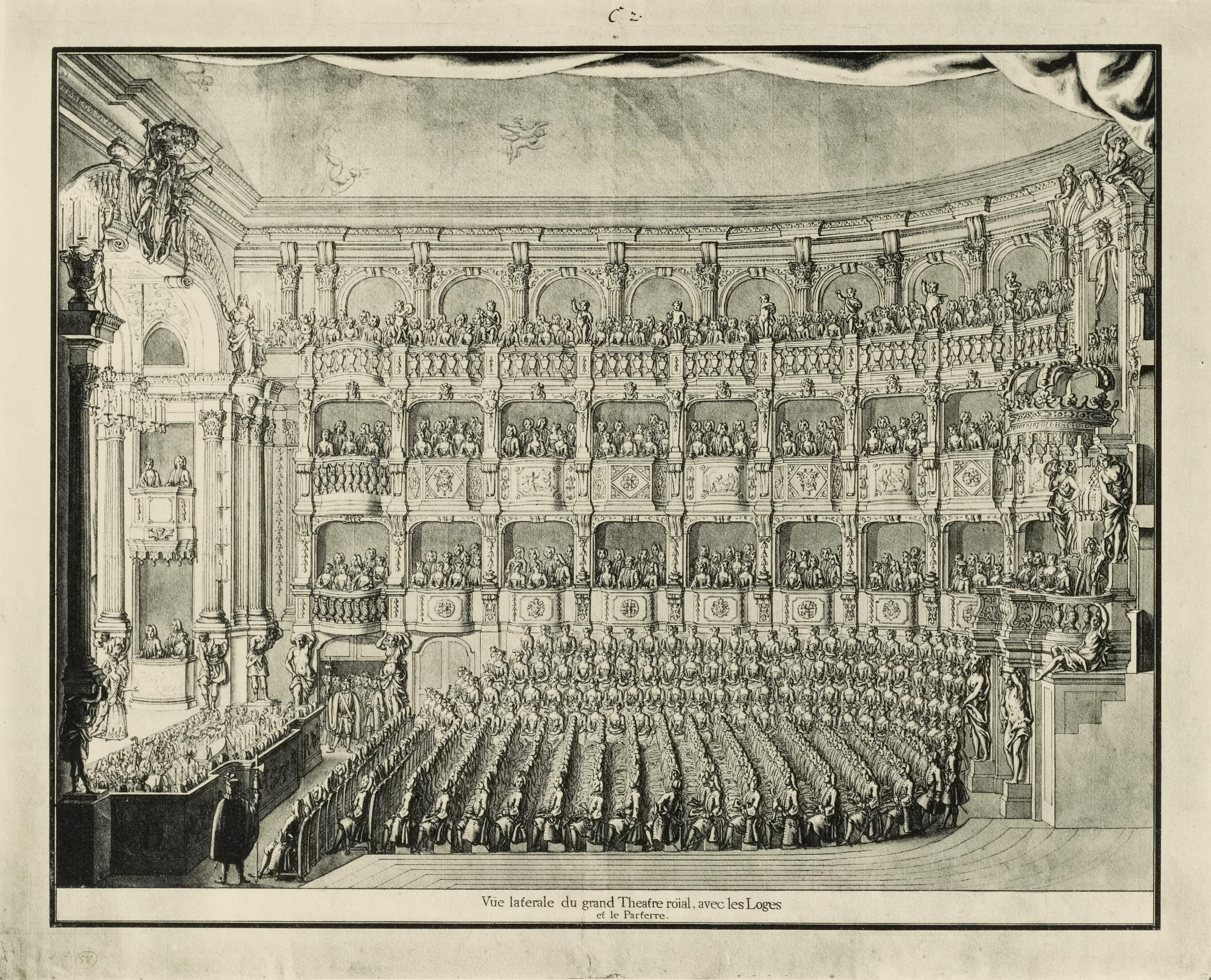
Opernhaus am Zwinger, the Dresden opera house opened in 1719. A lutenist and a theorbist can be seen in the orchestra.

In spring of 1718, Weiss played at the Dresden court of Augustus the Strong, the Elector of Saxony and King of Poland. He came to visit with permission of his employer, Charles III Philip, and received 100 ducats for two solo concerts. From August 1718, Weiss was employed as "Electoral Saxon and Royal Polish Chamber Musician" for a 1000 Reichsthaler salary, making him a part of one of the best musical ensembles in Europe. He served as orchestral lutenist and, more often, theorbist, for both secular and sacral performances. Additionally, he performed chamber music solo or in small groups for the court.

Soon after the start of his employment, Weiss was part of a group of musicians that accompanied Frederick Augustus II, the heir apparent, to the Imperial Court in Vienna. Frederick Augustus was there in order to choose one of the daughters of Joseph I, Holy Roman Emperor, as a bride. Weiss likely performed for the Emperor, Charles VI, possibly also together with the flutist Pierre-Gabriel Buffardin. Frederick Augustus married Maria Josepha of Austria in Vienna on 20 August 1719. After the couple arrived in Dresden in September, there were three weeks of festivities. Weiss was involved in a welcoming event at Pirna on 2 September and probably also as lutenist or theorbist in the first performances at the new Opernhaus am Zwinger opera house, where operas by Antonio Lotti were shown. In 1721, after the death of the aristocratic lutenist Jan Antonín Losy, known as Comte de Logy, Weiss composed a piece for the occasion, the Tombeau sur la mort de M. Comte de Logy, which later became one of his most famous pieces.

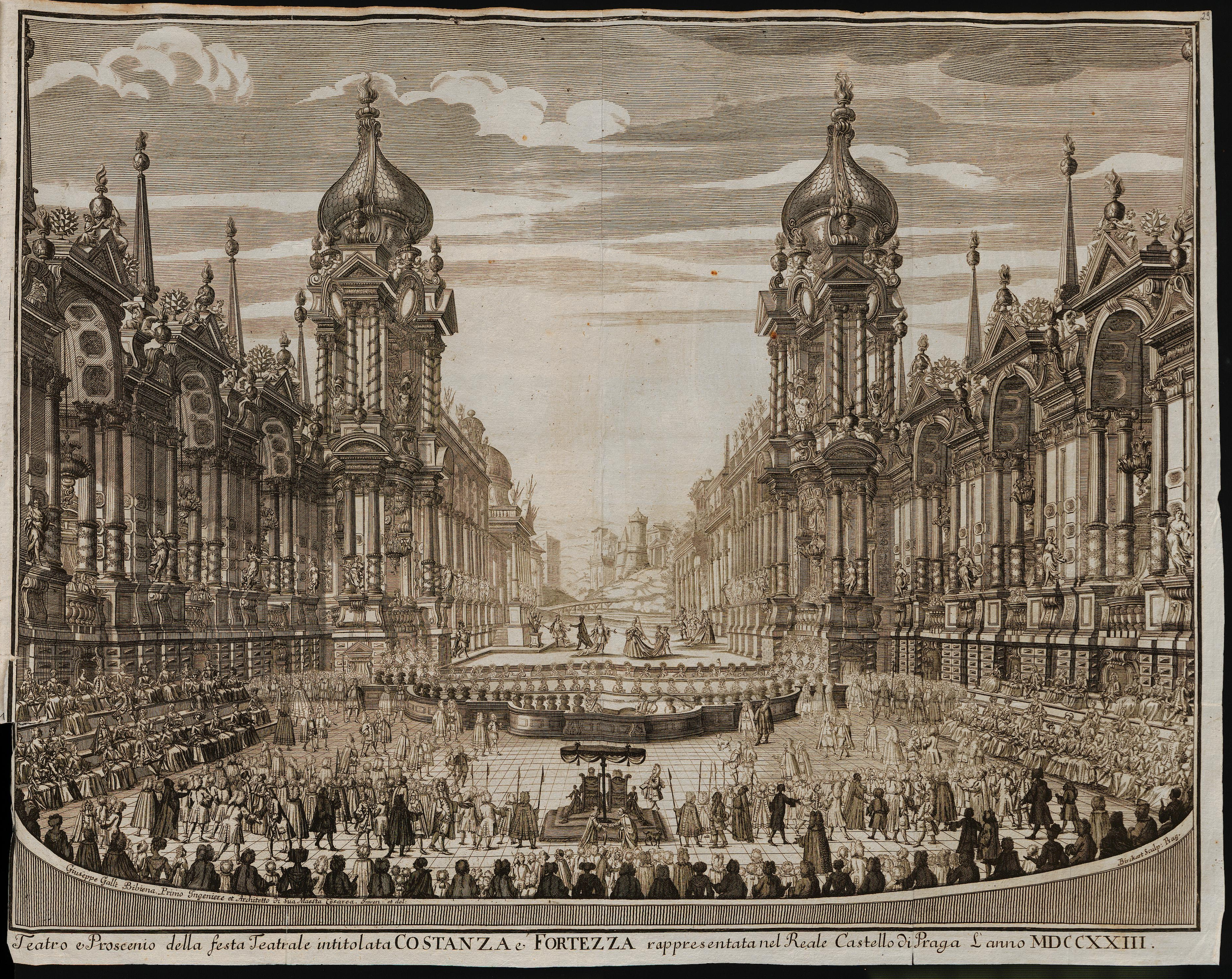
Performance of Costanza e fortezza by Johann Joseph Fux in the courtyard of Prague Castle

In 1722, Weiss was attacked by a violinist named Petit, who was probably French or Swiss and believed that Weiss prevented him from obtaining employment at the Dresden court. Petit pretended to kiss the hand of Weiss, but instead tried to bite off the top joint of his right thumb. Had he succeeded, Weiss would not have been able to resume his lute playing. The injury was not as bad as initially suspected, however, and Weiss could continue playing after a few months. In October of the same year, Weiss and Buffardin played in Munich at the wedding of the prince-elector's son, crown prince Charles Albert of Bavaria and archduchess Maria Amalia of Austria. In recognition of his performance, he received a present of 100 gold ducats from the prince-elector and a golden snuff box from the crown prince.

In July 1723, Weiss and fellow musicians Carl Heinrich Graun and Johann Joachim Quantz travelled to Prague for the coronation of Charles VI, Holy Roman Emperor as King of Bohemia, where the opera Costanza e fortezza by Johann Joseph Fux was premiered in an open-air performance. According to Quantz, the three musicians signed up to play in the orchestra (Weiss playing the theorbo, Quantz the oboe, and Graun the violoncello) so they could hear the opera; the crowds were so large that even many aristocrats were unable to attend.

During a visit by Frederick William I of Prussia to Dresden in January 1728, his son, crown prince Frederick II played the flute with Dresden court musicians including Quantz and Weiss. On a return visit in May of the same year, the musicians accompanied Augustus to Berlin, and the crown prince's sister Wilhelmine of Bayreuth later wrote that Weiss was a greater lutenist than all before or after him.

In 1731, Johann Adolf Hasse became the court composer in Dresden, starting a period of frequent performances of Italian opera. Weiss participated as part of the continuo section, playing the theorbo in the vast majority of performances. When Frederick Augustus II succeeded his father in 1733 as Elector of Saxony and King of Poland, the income of Weiss was raised to 1200 Reichsthaler, the same as concertmaster Johann Georg Pisendel and pantalonist Pantaleon Hebenstreit—the highest-paid instrumentalists at the Dresden court. In 1736, Weiss was offered an even higher salary of 2000 Reichsthaler at the imperial court in Vienna, but declined, stating that he did not want to be ungrateful to the Elector. Weiss was arrested by the Swiss Guards on 5 June 1738 after an offence against the Directeur des plaisirs (director of entertainment), Heinrich August von Breitenbauch, and released on 7 June after an intervention by the Russian ambassador, Hermann Karl von Keyserling. This incident apparently did not lead to any negative repercussions.

== Students ==
Around 1707, Weiss taught playing the lute to Johann Kropfgans the Elder, a merchant and lutenist in Breslau. Kropfgans, whose son Johann also became a lutenist, had previously received instruction from Philipp Franz Lesage de Richée, who probably also interacted with Weiss. Prince Phillip Hyacinth von Lobkowicz was a patron of Weiss, who probably taught the prince's second wife, Wilhelmine of Althann. Weiss later named several children after the Lobkowicz family.

The lutenist Ernst Gottlieb Baron received instructions from Weiss and later wrote about him in his book Untersuchung des Instruments der Lauten ('Study of the instrument of the lute'). The Russian ambassador to the Saxon-Polish court, Hermann Karl von Keyserling, arranged another student: From 1733 the Ukrainian Timofiy Bilohradsky, who was also a bandurist and singer, studied under Weiss for several years. He later became court lutenist in Moscow. It is possible that Weiss also gave some lessons to Wilhelmine of Bayreuth during his 1728 visit to Berlin. Near the end of his life, there is also evidence that Weiss taught some members of the Saxon-Polish royal family.

== Interaction with Johann Sebastian Bach ==
The composer Johann Sebastian Bach frequently visited Dresden, where his son Wilhelm Friedemann Bach worked as the organist of the Sophienkirche from 1733 to 1746. It is likely that Bach and Weiss met several times, but documentary evidence exists for only a four-week visit in Leipzig in 1739, when Wilhelm Friedemann Bach, Weiss and Kropfgans all played music at Bach's house together. In 1805, Johann Friedrich Reichardt published an additional report of Weiss and Bach playing music together, competing in playing fantasias and fugues. The time and place of this meeting, however, is unknown.

One of Bach's compositions, the trio in A major for violin and harpsichord BWV 1025, is based on a sonata by Weiss, no. 47 in A. In all but the first movement, the harpsichord part is essentially a faithful transcription of Weiss's solo lute part, with Bach adding the violin part. The first movement (Fantasia) also contains a short passage that is identical to one in a Weiss prelude, but the extent of his contribution to the work is unclear. It is possible that BWV 1025 is connected to the 1739 visit.

== Family, later years and death ==
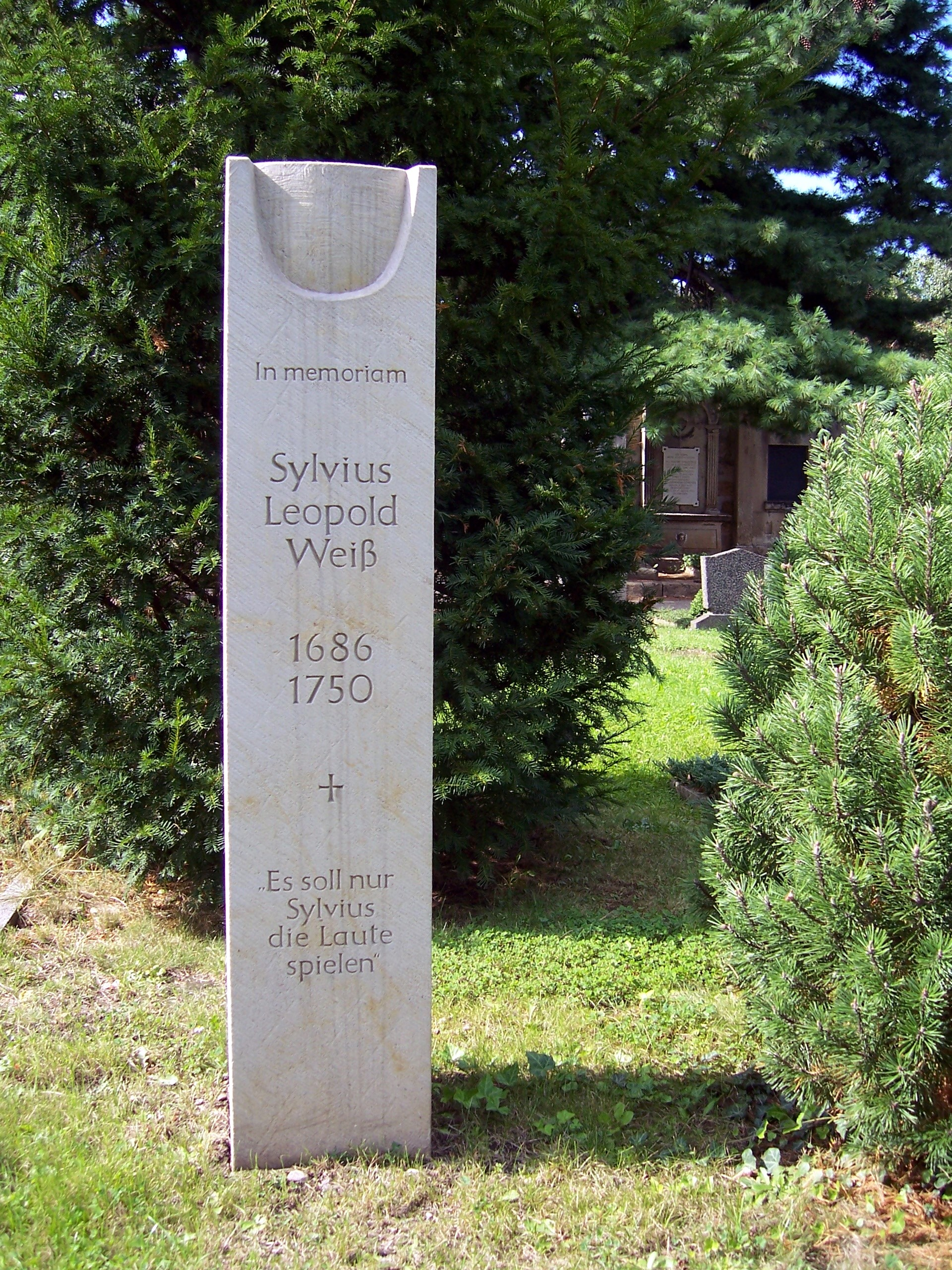
Stele commemorating Weiss in the Old Catholic Cemetery, Dresden

During his time in Rome, Weiss was married to an Italian named Maria Angela, who did not move to Germany with him and whose eventual fate is unknown. His second wife was Maria Elisabeth Josepha, whose surname is not known; they married before the end of 1719. They had eleven children, of whom seven were still alive at the time of their father's death. The first child was baptised on 19 August 1720 but not given a name, indicating it died at or soon after birth. The seventh child was a daughter, Maria Theresia Franziska Weiss (baptised 20 April 1730), who later married the classical philogist and librarian Christian Gottlob Heyne; their children included the writer Therese Huber. The final known child, Johann Adolph Faustinus Weiss, who later became a professional lutenist, was baptised on 15 April 1741; his godparents were the composer Johann Adolph Hasse and his wife, the singer Faustina Bordoni.

Weiss became the highest-paid instrumentalist at the Dresden court in 1744, when his salary was raised to 1400 Reichsthaler. His last known performance was in Johann Adolph Hasse's version of Il natal di Giove in August or October 1749 at Hubertusburg palace. Weiss died on 16 October 1750 and was buried on 19 October 1750 in the Old Catholic Cemetery, Dresden. The original tombstone no longer exists, but a commemorative stele for Weiss was installed on the cemetery grounds after c. 2000.

After the death of Weiss, his family became impoverished and pleaded for help from the Elector of Saxony; in 1754, his widow Maria Elisabetha Josepha became chamber matron to a newborn Saxon prince.

== Works ==
According to his entry in The New Grove Dictionary of Music and Musicians, there are more compositions for lute by Weiss known than by any other composer in history. (Note: According to Douglas Alton Smith, the only other similarly prolific composer for lute is Vincenzo Galilei.) Of the several hundred pieces known, the majority are sonatas with six movements. He also wrote concertos for lute and other instruments, but only the lute tablature for some of these has survived.

== Legacy and recognition ==
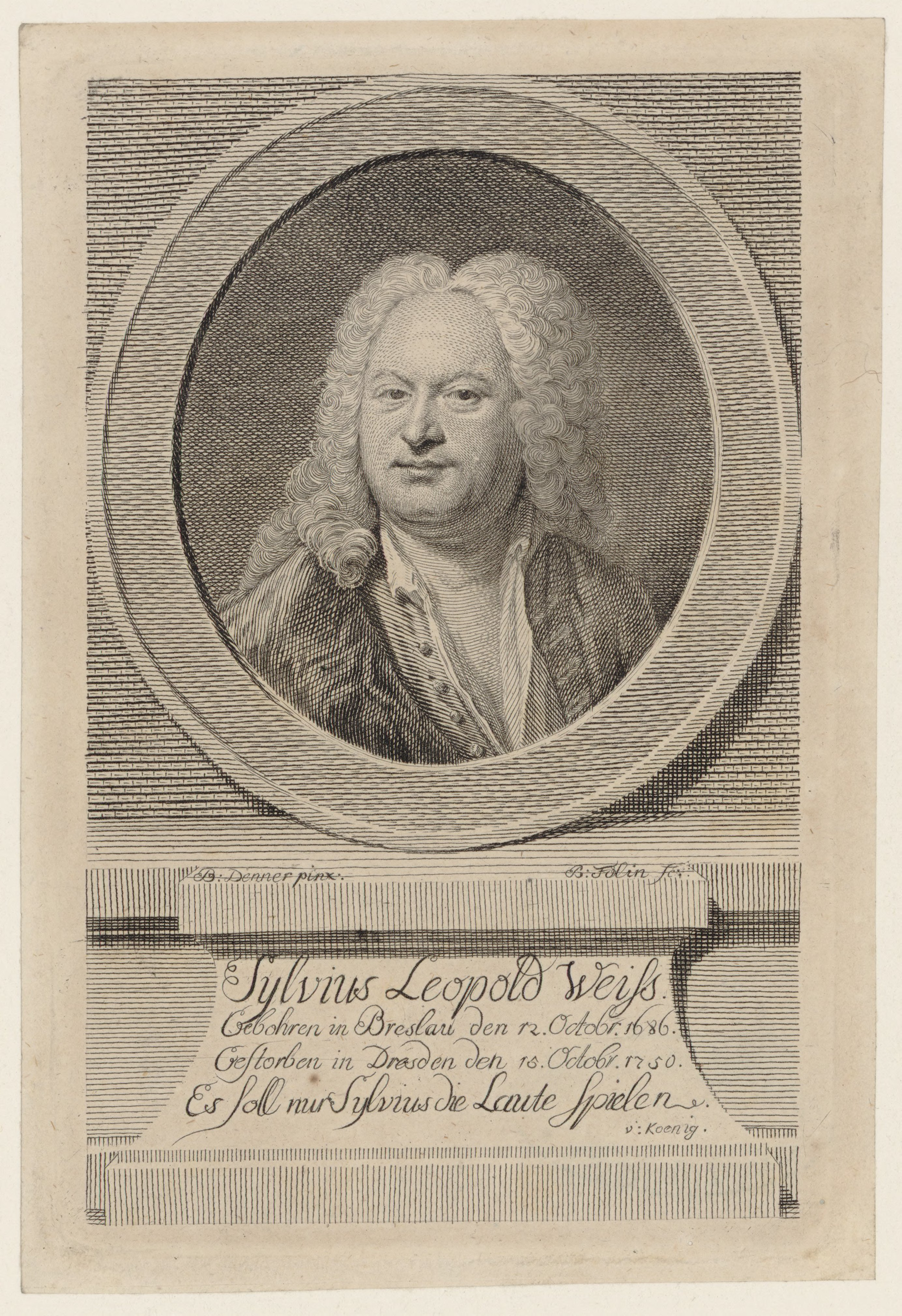
Silvius Leopold Weiss in a 1765 copper engraving by Bartolomeo Follin, after a painting by Balthasar Denner

One likeness of Weiss is known, an engraving by Bartolomeo Folin that served as the frontispiece of the first volume of the Neue Bibliothek der schönen Wissenschaften und der freyen Künste ('New Library of the Arts and Humanities'), published in Leipzig in 1765. This engraving is based on a lost painting by Balthasar Denner. Denner was in Dresden 1729–1730, so musicologist Hans Volkmann suggested this as a possible date for the painting. However, based on the maturity of Weiss in the engraving and the fact that Denner made a painting of the Dresden musician Johann Adolf Hasse in 1740, Kenneth Sparr has suggested that this painting is also from 1740. Folin also was from Venice and is reported to have lived in Dresden between 1763 and 1766. The engraving also contains an inscription, which gives Breslau as birthplace, 12 October 1686 as date of birth and 15 October 1750 as date of death, and was long trusted as a source for this data, but more recent research has cast doubt on or contradicted it. The biographical inscription is followed by the line Es soll nur Silvius die Laute spielen ("Only Silvius shall play the lute"), a quote from a poem by Johann Ulrich von König.

In his time, Weiss was generally seen as the best lutenist alive, or even of the best of all time. Ernst Gottlieb Baron's history of the lute says that Weiss and his brother Johann Sigismund "have brought the instrument to the highest peak of perfection", while Weiss was "the first to show that more could be done on the lute than was hitherto thought possible". Wilhelmine of Bayreuth said "[he] excels so greatly on the lute that he never had an equal and that those who come after him will have only the glory of imitating him". In modern assessment, such as in his entry in the New Grove Dictionary of Music and Musicians, Weiss is similarly regarded as "the greatest lutenist of the late Baroque and a peer of keyboard players such as J.S. Bach and Domenico Scarlatti." Since the 1980s, a complete edition of his works has been published, and there has been a significant amount of Weiss scholarship since the 1990s.

The Spanish classical guitarist Andrés Segovia played pieces attributed to Silvius Leopold Weiss at his concerts for many years from 1931. It was only revealed much later that these were composed by Manuel Ponce; in the meantime, Segovia's performances had helped to increase interest in the work of Weiss, although they also created some confusion as to what his music was like.

== Bibliography ==
- Crawford, Tim (20 January 2001). "Kropfgans [Kropffgans, Kropfganss], Johann". Grove Music Online (8th ed.). Oxford University Press. ISBN 978-1-56159-263-0. (subscription, Wikilibrary access, or UK public library membership required)
- Crawford, Tim (2022). "Luise Gottsched: Lute-playing heroine of her Age" (PDF). In Schlegel, Andreas (ed.). "... in das verlorene Paradies": Festschrift in memoriam Annette Otterstedt zum 70. Geburtstag am 23. September 2021. Menziken: The Lute Corner. ISBN 978-3-9523232-4-3.
- Fürstenau, Moritz (1879). "Graun, Carl Heinrich" . Allgemeine Deutsche Biographie (in German). Vol. 9. Leipzig: Duncker & Humblot. pp. 607–609.
- Hoffmann-Erbrecht, Lothar (12 March 2012). "Schlesische Lautenisten in Mitteldeutschland". In Garber, Klaus (ed.). Kulturgeschichte Schlesiens in der Frühen Neuzeit (in German). Max Niemeyer Verlag. pp. 933–940. doi:10.1515/9783110942545.933. ISBN 978-3-11-094254-5.
- Gärtner, Tomas (22 January 2021). "Geschichtsbuch aus Stein" (PDF). Dresdner Neueste Nachrichten. p. 14.
- Klier, Johannes (2020). "Geheimnis zweier Freunde". üben & musizieren (in German). No. 2. p. 54.
- Legl, Frank (1998). "Between Grottkau and Neuburg: New information on the biography of Silvius Leopold Weiss". Journal of the Lute Society of America. 31. Translated by Smith, Douglas Alton: 49–77.
- Legl, Frank (2000). "Zwischen Grottkau und Neuburg – Neues zur Biographie von Silvius Leopold Weiss". Die Laute. Jahrbuch der Deutschen Lautengesellschaft (in German). 4: 1–40. ISSN 1437-3378. OCLC 881078443.
- Legl, Frank (2003). "Die Silvius Leopold Weiss betreffenden Einträge im katholischen Taufregister des Dresdner Hofes". Die Laute. Jahrbuch der Deutschen Lautengesellschaft (in German). 7: 23–59. ISSN 1437-3378. OCLC 881078443.
- Legl, Frank (2009). "Kleinere neue Funde zur Biographie von Silvius Leopold Weiss". Die Laute. Jahrbuch der Deutschen Lautengesellschaft (in German). 8: 76–92. ISSN 1437-3378. OCLC 881078443.
- Legl, Frank (2017). "Grotkau oder Breslau? Neues zu Geburtsort und Geburtsjahr von Silvius Leopold Weiss". Die Laute. Jahrbuch der Deutschen Lautengesellschaft (in German). 12: 120–132. ISSN 1437-3378. OCLC 881078443.
- Legl, Frank (2020). "Weiss, Silvius". Neue Deutsche Biographie (in German). Vol. 27. Berlin: Duncker & Humblot. pp. 696–698. (full text online).
- Lundberg, Robert (1999). "Weiss's Lutes: The Origin of the 13-Course German Baroque Lutes". Journal of the Lute Society of America. 32: 35–66.
- Reilly, Edward R.; Smith, Douglas Alton; Crawford, Tim (20 January 2001). "Weiss, Silvius [Sylvius] Leopold". Grove Music Online (8th ed.). Oxford University Press. ISBN 978-1-56159-263-0. (subscription, Wikilibrary access, or UK public library membership required)
- Schnell, Dagmar (2001). "Silvius Leopold Weiss". In Allihn, Ingeborg (ed.). Barockmusikführer: Instrumentalmusik 1550–1770 (in German). Stuttgart: J.B. Metzler. pp. 503–506. doi:10.1007/978-3-476-99520-9_123. ISBN 978-3-476-99520-9.
- Schröder, Karl-Ernst (1995). "Zum Trio A-Dur BWV 1025: Anhang: Addenda et Corrigenda zu: Christoph Wolff, Das Trio A-Dur BWV 1025 (BJ 1993, S. 47-67)". Bach-Jahrbuch (in German). 81: 47–60. doi:10.13141/bjb.v19951055. ISSN 0084-7682.
- Segovia, Andrés; Ponce, Manuel María (1989). Alcázar, Miguel (ed.). The Segovia-Ponce Letters (in Spanish and English). Editions Orphée. ISBN 978-0-936186-29-0.
- Smith, Douglas Alton (1977). The Late Sonatas of Silvius Leopold Weiss. Stanford University.
- Smith, Douglas Alton (1980). "Sylvius Leopold Weiss". Early Music. 8 (1): 47–58. doi:10.1093/earlyj/8.1.47. ISSN 0306-1078. JSTOR 3126635.
- Smith, Douglas Alton (1998). "A Biography of Silvius Leopold Weiss". Journal of the Lute Society of America. 31: 1–48.
- Smith, Douglas Alton (2000). "Weiss and the 1719 Saxon-Hapsburg Wedding Festival in Dresden". Journal of the Lute Society of America. 33: 87–103.
- Sparr, Kenneth (1986). "A Poet's Description of the Lute Playing of Silvius Leopold Weiss, and a Possible Link Between Weiss and David Kellner". Journal of the Lute Society of America. 19: 58–67.
- Sparr, Kenneth (17 June 2018). "A Poet's Description of the Lute Playing of Silvius Leopold Weiss, and a Possible Link Between Weiss and David Kellner". tabulatura.com.
- Stone, Terrell (2006). "Italy and the Transformation of Weiss's Solo Lute Style". Journal of the Lute Society of America. 39: 65–74.
- Vacca, Francesca (2000). "Weiss in Rome (1712–1713): first archival findings". Journal of the Lute Society of America. 33: 13–31.
- Volkmann, Hans (1907). "Sylvius Leopold Weiss. Der letzte grosse Lautenist". Die Musik. 23 (3): 273–289.
- Wade, Graham; Garno, Gerard (26 September 2018). A New Look at Segovia, His Life, His Music, Volume 2. Mel Bay Publications. ISBN 978-1-61911-588-0.
- Wilhelmine, Margravine of Bayreuth (1889). Mémoires de Frédérique Sophie Wilhelmine, margrave de Bareith, soeur de Frédéric le Grand : depuis l'année 1706 jusqu'à 1742, écrits de sa main (in French) (3rd ed.).
- Wolff, Christoph (1993). "Das Trio A-Dur BWV 1025: Eine Lautensonate von Silvius Leopold Weiss, bearbeitet von Johann Sebastian Bach". Bach-Jahrbuch (in German). 79: 47–67. doi:10.13141/bjb.v19931142. ISSN 0084-7682.
- Żak, Jerzy (2000). "The Sobieskis in Silesia and in Rome: Weiss's first royal patrons". Journal of the Lute Society of America. 33: 1–12.
