= List of composers for the classical guitar =

The following is a non-comprehensive list of composers who have composed original music for the classical guitar, or music which has been arranged for it.

| Composer | Born | Died | Nationality | Notable works | Remarks |
|---|---|---|---|---|---|
| Jean Absil | 1893 | 1974 | Belgium | Pièces caractéristiques, Op. 123 | |
| Samuel Adler | 1928 | | United States | | |
| Dionisio Aguado | 1784 | 1849 | Spain | | |
| Miguel del Aguila | 1957 | | | | |
| Kalevi Aho | 1949 | | Finland | | |
| Mateo Albéniz | 1755 | 1831 | Spain | | |
| Heinrich Albert | 1870 | 1950 | Germany | | |
| Laurindo Almeida | 1917 | 1995 | Brazil | | |
| Gabriel Fernández Álvez | 1943 | 2008 | Spain | Liturgia de Cristal | |
| André Amellér | 1912 | 1990 | France | | |
| Julian Anderson | 1967 | | United Kingdom | | |
| William Anderson | 1962 | | United States | | |
| Louis Andriessen | 1939 | 2021 | Netherlands | | |
| Maria Luisa Anido | 1907 | 1996 | Argentina | | |
| Denis ApIvor | 1916 | 2004 | United Kingdom | | |
| Julián Arcas | 1832 | 1882 | Spain | | |
| Malcolm Arnold | 1921 | 2006 | United Kingdom | | |
| Eduardo Arolas | 1892 | 1924 | Argentina | | |
| Boris Asafiev | 1884 | 1949 | Russia | | |
| Vicente Asencio | 1908 | 1979 | Spain | Collectici intim, Suite Valencia | |
| Daniel Asia | 1953 | | United States | | |
| Sérgio Assad | 1952 | | Brazil | | |
| Nicolas Astrinidis | 1921 | 2010 | Greece | Concerto for Guitar and Orchestra | |
| Olivier Aubert | 1763 | 1830 | France | | |
| Hector Ayala | 1914 | 1990 | Argentina | Serie Americana | |
| Milton Babbitt | 1916 | 2011 | United States | | |
| Salvador Bacarisse | 1898 | 1963 | | | |
| Henk Badings | 1907 | 1987 | Netherlands | | |
| Simon Bainbridge | 1952 | 2021 | United Kingdom | | |
| Leonardo Balada | 1933 | | United States | | Born in Spain. |
| Claude Ballif | 1924 | 2004 | France | | |
| Carlos Barbosa-Lima | 1944 | 2022 | Brazil | | Re-located to the United States in 1981. |
| Vytautas Barkauskas | 1931 | 2020 | Lithuania | | |
| Milton Barnes | 1931 | 2001 | Canada | | |
| Richard Barrett | 1959 | | United Kingdom | | |
| Ángel Barrios | 1882 | 1964 | Spain | | |
| Agustin Barrios | 1885 | 1944 | Paraguay | | |
| Ary Barroso | 1903 | 1964 | Brazil | | |
| Bruno Bartolozzi | 1911 | 1980 | Italy | | |
| Abramo Basevi | 1818 | 1885 | Italy | | |
| Leslie Bassett | 1923 | 2016 | United States | | |
| Herbert Baumann | 1925 | 2020 | Germany | | |
| Jürg Baur | 1918 | 2010 | Germany | | |
| Julian Bautista | 1901 | 1961 | Spain | | |
| Eduard Bayer | 1822 | 1908 | Germany | | |
| Sally Beamish | 1956 | | | | |
| Robert Beaser | 1954 | | United States | | |
| Gustavo Becerra-Schmidt | 1925 | 2010 | Chile | | |
| David Bedford | 1937 | 2011 | United Kingdom | | |
| Franz Behr | 1837 | 1898 | Germany | | |
| Siegfried Behrend | 1933 | 1990 | Germany | | |
| Paulo Bellinati | 1950 | | Brazil | | |
| Carl Michael Bellman | 1740 | 1795 | Sweden | | |
| Richard Rodney Bennett | 1936 | 2012 | United Kingdom | Five Impromptus | |
| Gunnar Berg | 1909 | 1989 | Denmark | | |
| Luciano Berio | 1925 | 2003 | Italy | Sequenza XI for guitar | |
| Lennox Berkeley | 1903 | 1989 | United Kingdom | | |
| Michael Berkeley | 1948 | | United Kingdom | | |
| Hector Berlioz | 1803 | 1869 | France | | |
| Leonard Bernstein | 1918 | 1990 | United States | | |
| Bruno Bettinelli | 1913 | 2004 | Italy | | |
| Frank Michael Beyer | 1928 | 2008 | Germany | | |
| Günter Bialas | 1907 | 1995 | Germany | | |
| Antonio Bibalo | 1922 | 2008 | Norway | | |
| Gilbert Biberian | 1944 | 2023 | Turkey | | Active in England. |
| Ronald Binge | 1910 | 1979 | United Kingdom | | |
| Howard Blake | 1938 | | United Kingdom | | |
| Michael Blake | 1951 | | South Africa | | |
| Juan Blanco | 1919 | 2008 | Cuba | | |
| Manuel Blasco de Nebra | 1750 | 1784 | Spain | | |
| Carl Blum | 1786 | 1844 | Germany | | |
| Carey Blyton | 1932 | 2002 | United Kingdom | | |
| Vladimir Bobri | 1898 | 1986 | United States | | Born in Ukraine. |
| Jan Nepomucen Bobrowicz | 1805 | 1881 | Poland | | |
| Luigi Boccherini | 1743 | 1805 | Italy | | |
| John Boda | 1922 | 2002 | United States | | |
| Seóirse Bodley | 1933 | 2023 | Ireland | | |
| Philippe Boesmans | 1936 | 2022 | Belgium | | |
| Dusan Bogdanovic | 1955 | | Serbia | | |
| Rob du Bois | 1934 | 2013 | Netherlands | | |
| William Bolcom | 1938 | | United States | | |
| Claude Bolling | 1930 | 2020 | France | | |
| Carlos Bonell | 1949 | | United Kingdom | | |
| Luiz Bonfá | 1922 | 2001 | Brazil | | |
| Carlos Bonilla Chávez | 1923 | 2010 | Ecuador | | |
| Carlos Bonnet | 1892 | 1983 | Venezuela | | |
| Raúl Borges | 1882 | 1967 | Venezuela | | |
| Axel Borup-Jørgensen | 1924 | 2012 | Denmark | | |
| Jacques Bosch | 1825 | 1895 | Spain | | |
| Jean-Yves Bosseur | 1947 | | France | | |
| Pierre Boulez | 1925 | 2016 | France | | |
| Timothy Bowers | 1954 | | United Kingdom | Five Preludes (1986) Guitar Concerto (2019) | |
| Brian Boydell | 1917 | 2000 | Ireland | | |
| Eugene Bozza | 1905 | 1991 | France | | |
| Philip Bračanin | 1942 | | Australia | | |
| Charlotte Bray | 1982 | | United Kingdom | | |
| Reiner Bredemeyer | 1929 | 1995 | Germany | | |
| Benjamin Britten | 1913 | 1976 | United Kingdom | Nocturnal after John Dowland | |
| José Brocá | 1805 | 1882 | Spain | | |
| Leo Brouwer | 1939 | | Cuba | | |
| Ole Buck | 1943 | | Denmark | | |
| John Buckley | 1951 | | Ireland | | |
| Jarmil Burghauser | 1921 | 1997 | Czechoslovakia | | |
| Geoffrey Burgon | 1941 | 2010 | United Kingdom | | |
| Willy Burkhard | 1900 | 1955 | Switzerland | | |
| Howard J. Buss | 1951 | | United States | | |
| Sylvano Bussotti | 1931 | 2021 | Italy | | |
| Charlie Byrd | 1925 | 1999 | United States | | |
| German Cáceres | 1954 | | El Salvador | | |
| Bartolomé Calatayud | 1882 | 1973 | Spain | | |
| Leonhard von Call | 1767 | 1815 | Austria | | |
| Charles Camilleri | 1931 | 2009 | Malta | | |
| Dmitri Capyrin | 1960 | | Russia | | |
| Matteo Carcassi | 1792 | 1853 | Italy | | |
| Cornelius Cardew | 1936 | 1981 | United Kingdom | | |
| Jorge Cardoso | 1949 | | Argentina | | |
| Carlo Carfagna | 1940 | | Italy | | |
| Abel Carlevaro | 1918 | 2001 | Uruguay | Preludios Americanos | |
| Roberto Carnevale | 1966 | | Italy | | |
| Inocente Carreño | 1919 | 2016 | Venezuela | | |
| Elliott Carter | 1908 | 2012 | United States | | |
| Ferdinando Carulli | 1770 | 1841 | Italy | | Re-located to France in 1808. |
| Tristram Cary | 1925 | 2008 | | | |
| Benet Casablancas | 1956 | | Spain | | |
| Francisco Casanovas | 1899 | 1986 | Spain | | |
| Philip Cashian | 1963 | | | | |
| Gaspar Cassadó | 1897 | 1966 | Spain | | |
| Frantz Casseus | 1915 | 1993 | Haiti | | |
| Luigi Castellacci | 1797 | 1845 | Italy | | |
| Evencio Castellanos | 1915 | 1984 | Venezuela | | |
| Mario Castelnuovo-Tedesco | 1895 | 1968 | Italy | | Re-located to the United States in 1939. |
| Jacques Casterede | 1926 | 2014 | France | | |
| Ignacio Cervantes | 1847 | 1905 | Cuba | | |
| Luciano Chailly | 1920 | 2002 | Italy | | |
| Carlos Chávez | 1899 | 1978 | Mexico | | |
| Flores Chaviano | 1946 | | Cuba | | |
| Charles Chaynes | 1925 | 2016 | France | | |
| Gian Paolo Chiti | 1939 | | Italy | | |
| Loris Chobanian | 1933 | 2023 | Iraq | | Re-located to the United States in 1960. |
| Domenico Cimarosa | 1749 | 1801 | Italy | | |
| Pier Luigi Cimma | 1941 | 2006 | Italy | | |
| Charles Clagget | 1740 | 1790 | Ireland | | Year of death is approximate |
| Aldo Clementi | 1925 | 2011 | Italy | | |
| Joaquín Clerch | 1965 | | Cuba | | |
| Graziella Concas | 1970 | | | | |
| Marius Constant | 1925 | 2004 | | | |
| Sidney Corbett | 1960 | | | | |
| Ernesto Cordero | 1946 | | Puerto Rico | | |
| Roque Cordero | 1917 | 2008 | Panama | | |
| John Corigliano | 1938 | | | | |
| Dan Cosley | 1979 | | United States | | |
| Napoléon Coste | 1805 | 1883 | France | | |
| Terence Croucher | 1944 | | United Kingdom | | |
| George Crumb | 1929 | 2022 | | | |
| Salim Dada | 1975 | | Algeria | | |
| Georges Dandelot | 1895 | 1975 | France | | |
| Jean-Yves Daniel-Lesur | 1908 | 2002 | France | | |
| Adam Darr | 1811 | 1866 | Germany | | |
| Johann Nepomuk David | 1895 | 1977 | Austria | | |
| Thomas Christian David | 1925 | 2006 | Austria | | |
| Mario Davidovsky | 1934 | 2019 | Argentina, United States | | |
| Peter Maxwell Davies | 1934 | 2016 | United Kingdom | | |
| Jerome de Bromhead | 1945 | | Ireland | | |
| Ernesto De Curtis | 1860 | 1926 | Italy | | |
| Paco de Lucia | 1947 | 2014 | Spain | | |
| Jean Michel Defaye | 1932 | 2025 | France | | |
| Søffren Degen | 1816 | 1885 | Denmark | | |
| David Del Tredici | 1937 | 2023 | United States | | |
| Georges Delerue | 1925 | 1992 | France | | |
| Mark Delpriora | 1959 | | United States | | |
| Santiago de Murcia | 1673 | 1739 | Spain | | |
| Michael Denhoff | 1955 | | Germany | | |
| Luigi Denza | 1846 | 1922 | Italy | | |
| Ettore Desderi | 1892 | 1974 | Italy | | |
| Yvonne Desportes | 1903 | 1993 | France | | |
| Paul Dessau | 1894 | 1979 | Germany | | |
| Eduardo di Capua | 1864 | 1917 | Italy | | |
| Anton Diabelli | 1781 | 1858 | Austria | | |
| David Diamond | 1915 | 2005 | United States | | |
| James Dillon | 1950 | | United Kingdom | | |
| Violeta Dinescu | 1953 | | | | |
| Stephen Dodgson | 1924 | 2013 | United Kingdom | | |
| Friedhelm Döhl | 1936 | 2018 | Germany | | |
| Uroš Dojčinović | 1959 | | Serbia | | |
| Carlo Domeniconi | 1947 | | Italy | | |
| Franco Donatoni | 1927 | 2000 | Italy | | |
| Andrew Downes | 1950 | 2023 | United Kingdom | | |
| František Drdla | 1868 | 1944 | Bohemia | | |
| Riccardo Drigo | 1846 | 1930 | Italy | | |
| John W. Duarte | 1919 | 2004 | United Kingdom | | |
| Johann Dubez | 1828 | 1891 | Austria | | |
| Pierre Max Dubois | 1930 | 1995 | France | | |
| Zsolt Durkó | 1934 | 1997 | Hungary | | |
| Frantisek Xaver Dusek | 1731 | 1799 | Bohemia | | |
| Antonín Dvořák | 1841 | 1904 | Czechoslovakia | | |
| Benjamin Dwyer | 1965 | | Ireland | | |
| Roland Dyens | 1955 | 2016 | | | |
| Tom Eastwood | 1922 | 1999 | United Kingdom | | |
| Petr Eben | 1929 | 2007 | Czechoslovakia | | |
| Ross Edwards | 1943 | | Australia | | |
| René Eespere | 1953 | | | | |
| Gottfried von Einem | 1918 | 1996 | Austria | | |
| Richard Emsley | 1951 | | | | |
| Manuel Enriquez | 1926 | 1994 | | | |
| József Eötvös | 1962 | | Hungary | | |
| Heimo Erbse | 1924 | 2005 | Germany | | |
| Susanne Erding-Swiridoff | 1955 | | Germany | | |
| Óscar Esplá | 1889 | 1976 | Spain | | |
| Sveinn Eythorsson | 1964 | | Iceland | | |
| Kenjiro Ezaki | 1926 | | Japan | | |
| Sebastian Fagerlund | 1972 | | Finland | | |
| Markus Fagerudd | 1961 | | Finland | | |
| Manuel de Falla | 1876 | 1946 | Spain | Pour le tombeau de Claude Debussy | Re-located to Argentina in 1939. |
| Eduardo Falú | 1923 | 2013 | Argentina | | |
| Juan Falú | 1948 | | Argentina | | |
| Dimitris Fampas | 1921 | 1996 | Greece | | |
| Carlos Farinas | 1934 | 2002 | Cuba | | |
| Ferenc Farkas | 1905 | 2000 | Hungary | | |
| David Farquhar | 1928 | 2007 | New Zealand | | |
| Ciarán Farrell | 1969 | | Ireland | | |
| Jindřich Feld | 1925 | 2007 | Czechoslovakia | | |
| Jim Ferguson | 1948 | | United States | | |
| Heraclio Fernández | 1851 | 1886 | Venezuela | | |
| Oscar Lorenzo Fernández | 1897 | 1948 | Brazil | | |
| Gabriel Fernández Álvez | 1943 | 2008 | Spain | | |
| Brian Ferneyhough | 1943 | | United Kingdom | | |
| José Ferrer | 1835 | 1916 | Spain | | |
| Paul Fetler | 1920 | 2018 | United States | | |
| Michael Finnissy | 1946 | | United Kingdom | | |
| Graciane Finzi | 1945 | | | | |
| Graham Fitkin | 1963 | | United Kingdom | | |
| David Flynn | 1977 | | Ireland | | |
| William Foden | 1860 | 1947 | United States | | |
| Daniel Fortea | 1878 | 1953 | Spain | | |
| Lukas Foss | 1922 | 2009 | | | |
| François de Fossa | 1775 | 1849 | France | | |
| Yorgos Foudoulis | 1964 | | Greece | | |
| Jean Françaix | 1912 | 1997 | France | | |
| Peter Racine Fricker | 1920 | 1990 | United Kingdom | | Re-located to the United States in the 1960s |
| Gunnar de Frumerie | 1908 | 1987 | Sweden | | |
| James Fulkerson | 1945 | | United States | | |
| Blas Galindo | 1910 | 1993 | Mexico | | |
| Boris Gaquere | 1977 | | Belgium | | |
| Gerald García | 1949 | | United Kingdom | | Born in Hong Kong. |
| Héctor García (guitarist) | 1930 | 2022 | USA | | Born in Cuba. |
| Anton García Abril | 1933 | 2021 | Spain | | |
| Rosa García Ascot | 1906 | 2002 | Spain | | |
| Celso Garrido Lecca | 1926 | 2025 | Peru | | |
| Odette Gartenlaub | 1922 | 2014 | France | | |
| Éric Gaudibert | 1936 | 2012 | Switzerland | | |
| Hans Gefors | 1952 | | Sweden | | |
| Harald Genzmer | 1909 | 2007 | Germany | | |
| Roberto Gerhard | 1896 | 1970 | Spain | | Re-located to England in 1939. |
| Giorgio Federico Ghedini | 1892 | 1965 | Italy | | |
| Gilardo Gilardi | 1889 | 1963 | Argentina | | |
| Angelo Gilardino | 1941 | 2022 | Italy | | |
| Alberto Ginastera | 1916 | 1983 | | | |
| Egberto Gismonti | 1947 | | Brazil | | |
| Mauro Giuliani | 1781 | 1829 | Italy | | |
| Barbara Giuranna | 1898 | 1998 | Italy | | |
| Detlev Glanert | 1960 | | Germany | | |
| Stanley Glasser | 1926 | 2018 | South Africa | | |
| Anthony Glise | 1956 | | | | |
| Radames Gnattali | 1906 | 1988 | Brazil | | |
| Vincente Gomez | 1911 | 2001 | Spain | | |
| Chiquinha Gonzaga | 1847 | 1935 | Brazil | | |
| Nikos Gounaris | 1915 | 1965 | Greece | | |
| Filippo Gragnani | 1768 | 1820 | Italy | | |
| Harold Gramatges | 1918 | 2008 | Cuba | | |
| Agustí Grau | 1893 | 1964 | Spain | | |
| Deirdre Gribbin | 1967 | | Ireland | | |
| Cor de Groot | 1914 | 1993 | Netherlands | | |
| Camargo Guarnieri | 1907 | 1993 | Brazil | | |
| Carlos Guastavino | 1912 | 2000 | Argentina | | |
| Gerardo Guevara | 1930 | 2024 | Ecuador | | |
| Róbert Gulya | 1973 | | Hungary | | |
| Gustav Gunsenheimer | 1934 | 2026 | Germany | | |
| Alexander Gurilev | 1803 | 1858 | Russia | | |
| Guyún | 1908 | 1987 | Cuba | | Actual name is Vincente Gonzalez Rubiera. |
| Sampo Haapamäki | 1979 | | Finland | | |
| Alois Hába | 1893 | 1973 | | | |
| Manos Hadjidakis | 1925 | 1996 | Greece | | |
| Georg Hajdu | 1960 | | Germany | | |
| Kimmo Hakola | 1958 | | Finland | | |
| Cristóbal Halffter | 1930 | 2021 | Spain | | |
| Ernesto Halffter | 1905 | 1989 | Spain | | |
| Rodolfo Halffter | 1900 | 1987 | Spain | | |
| Haflidi Hallgrimsson | 1941 | | Iceland | | |
| Hilding Hallnäs | 1903 | 1984 | Sweden | | |
| Eero Hämeenniemi | 1951 | | Finland | | |
| Peter Michael Hamel | 1947 | | Germany | | |
| Albert Harris | 1916 | 2005 | United States | | |
| Lou Harrison | 1917 | 2003 | United States | | |
| Heinz Friedrich Hartig | 1907 | 1969 | Germany | | |
| Jonathan Harvey | 1939 | 2012 | United Kingdom | | |
| Roman Haubenstock-Ramati | 1919 | 1994 | Poland | | |
| Halvor Haug | 1952 | 2025 | Norway | | |
| Hans Haug | 1900 | 1967 | Switzerland | | |
| Brian Head | 1964 | | United States | | |
| Anton Heiller | 1923 | 1979 | Austria | | |
| Paavo Heininen | 1938 | 2022 | Finland | | |
| Mikko Heiniö | 1948 | | Finland | | |
| Walter Hekster | 1937 | 2012 | Netherlands | | |
| Hans Werner Henze | 1926 | 2012 | Germany | Royal Winter Music | |
| Ernst Hess | 1912 | 1968 | Switzerland | | |
| Jacques Hétu | 1938 | 2010 | Canada | | |
| Paul Hindemith | 1895 | 1963 | Germany | | |
| Takekuni Hirayoshi | 1936 | 1998 | Japan | | |
| Evan Hirschelman | 1976 | | United States | | |
| Alun Hoddinott | 1929 | 2008 | United Kingdom | | |
| Justin Holland | 1819 | 1887 | United States | | |
| Vagn Holmboe | 1909 | 1996 | Denmark | | |
| Joaquim Homs | 1906 | 2003 | Spain | | |
| Felix Horetzky | 1796 | 1870 | Poland | | |
| Joseph Horovitz | 1926 | 2022 | | | |
| Alan Hovhaness | 1911 | 2000 | United States | | |
| Klaus Huber | 1924 | 2017 | Switzerland | | |
| Josiah Andrew Hudleston | 1799 | 1865 | United Kingdom | | Mostly composed while living in India. |
| Georges Hugon | 1904 | 1980 | France | | |
| Bertold Hummel | 1925 | 2002 | Germany | | |
| Jacques Ibert | 1890 | 1962 | France | | |
| Akira Ifukube | 1914 | 2006 | Japan | | |
| Adina Izarra | 1959 | | Venezuela | | |
| David A. Jaffe | 1955 | | | | |
| Stephen Jaffe | 1954 | | | | |
| Hanns Jelinek | 1901 | 1969 | Austria | | |
| Jiří Jirmal | 1925 | 2019 | Czechoslovakia | | |
| Otto Joachim | 1910 | 2010 | | | |
| Antonio Carlos Jobim | 1927 | 1994 | Brazil | | |
| Bryan Johanson | 1951 | | United States | | |
| André Jolivet | 1905 | 1974 | France | | |
| Antonio José Martínez Palacios | 1902 | 1936 | | | |
| Wilfred Josephs | 1927 | 1997 | | | |
| Dimitri Kabalevsky | 1904 | 1987 | Russia | | |
| Pál Kadosa | 1903 | 1983 | Hungary | | |
| Mauricio Kagel | 1931 | 2008 | Argentina | | |
| Jouni Kaipainen | 1956 | 2015 | Finland | | |
| Viktor Kalabis | 1923 | 2006 | Czechoslovakia | | |
| Shigeru Kan-no | 1959 | | Japan | | |
| Ahti Karjalainen | 1907 | 1986 | Finland | | |
| Elena Kats-Chernin | 1957 | | | | |
| Bryan Kelly | 1934 | 2026 | United Kingdom | | |
| Rudolf Kelterborn | 1931 | 2021 | Switzerland | | |
| Aaron Jay Kernis | 1960 | | United States | | |
| Harrison Kerr | 1897 | 1978 | United States | | |
| Aram Khachaturian | 1903 | 1978 | Russia | | |
| Peter Klatzow | 1945 | 2021 | South Africa | | |
| Giselher Klebe | 1925 | 2009 | Germany | | |
| Anđelko Klobučar | 1931 | 2016 | | | |
| Erland von Koch | 1910 | 2009 | Sweden | | |
| Gareth Koch | 1962 | | Australia | | |
| Miklos Kocsar | 1933 | 2019 | Hungary | | |
| Oliver Kohlenberg | 1957 | | Finland | | |
| Karl Kohn | 1926 | 2024 | United States | | Born in Austria. |
| Barbara Kolb | 1938 | 2024 | United States | | |
| Heinrich Konietzny | 1910 | 1983 | Germany | | |
| Olli Kortekangas | 1955 | | Finland | | |
| Nikita Koshkin | 1956 | | | | |
| Leon Koudelak | 1961 | | Czechoslovakia | | |
| Leopold Kozeluh | 1747 | 1818 | Bohemia | | |
| Joseph-François Kremer | 1954 | | | | |
| Ernst Krenek | 1900 | 1991 | Austria | | Re-located to the United States in 1938. |
| Joseph Kreutzer | 1790 | 1840 | Germany | | |
| Annette Kruisbrink | 1958 | | Netherlands | | |
| Andrei Krylov | 1959 | | | | |
| Augustin Kubizek | 1918 | 2009 | Austria | | |
| Joseph Küffner | 1776 | 1856 | Germany | | |
| Felicitas Kukuck | 1914 | 2001 | Germany | | |
| György Kurtág | 1926 | | | | |
| Helmut Lachenmann | 1935 | | Germany | | |
| Alexandre Lagoya | 1929 | 1999 | | | |
| Gordon Langford | 1930 | 2017 | United Kingdom | | |
| Paul Lansky | 1944 | | | Crooked Courante (1997); Semi-Suite (1998); Practical Preludes (2007–08) | |
| Libby Larsen | 1950 | | United States | | |
| Anne Lauber | 1943 | | | | |
| Antonio Lauro | 1917 | 1986 | Venezuela | | |
| Mario Lavista | 1943 | 2021 | | | |
| Alan Lawrence | 1949 | | United Kingdom | | |
| Ernesto Lecuona | 1896 | 1963 | Cuba | | |
| Ton de Leeuw | 1926 | 1996 | Netherlands | | |
| Victor Legley | 1915 | 1994 | Belgium | | |
| Luigi Legnani | 1790 | 1877 | Italy | | |
| David Leisner | 1953 | | United States | | |
| Edith Lejet | 1941 | 2024 | France | | |
| John Anthony Lennon | 1950 | | United States | | |
| James Lentini | 1958 | | United States | | |
| Tania León | 1943 | | Cuba | | |
| Peter Scott Lewis | 1953 | | United States | | |
| Antoine de Lhoyer | 1768 | 1852 | France | | |
| Lowell Liebermann | 1961 | | | | |
| Douglas Lilburn | 1915 | 2001 | New Zealand | | |
| Magnus Lindberg | 1958 | | Finland | | |
| Jukka Linkola | 1955 | | Finland | | |
| Miguel Llobet | 1878 | 1938 | Spain | | Arranger of many Catalan folksongs. |
| Guillermo Venegas Lloveras | 1915 | 1993 | Puerto Rico | | |
| Andrew Lloyd Webber | 1948 | | United Kingdom | | |
| Manos Loïzos | 1937 | 1982 | Greece | | |
| Luca Lombardi | 1945 | | Italy | | |
| Dang Ngoc Long | 1957 | | Vietnam/Germany | | |
| Fernando Lopes-Graca | 1906 | 1994 | Portugal | | |
| Bent Lorentzen | 1935 | 2018 | Denmark | | |
| Paco de Lucia | 1947 | 2014 | Spain | | |
| Otto Luening | 1900 | 1996 | United States | | |
| Vilho Luolajan-Mikkola | 1911 | 2005 | Finland | | |
| Witold Lutosławski | 1913 | 1994 | Poland | | |
| Elisabeth Lutyens | 1906 | 1983 | United Kingdom | | |
| Diego Luzuriaga | 1955 | | Ecuador | | |
| Anatoly Konstantinovich Lyadov | 1855 | 1914 | Russia | | |
| Bruce MacCombie | 1943 | 2012 | United States | | |
| Celso Machado | 1953 | | Brazil | | |
| Peter Machajdík | 1961 | | Slovakia | | |
| Steven Mackey | 1956 | | | | |
| Bruno Maderna | 1920 | 1973 | Germany | | |
| Jef Maes | 1905 | 1996 | Belgium | | |
| Victor Magnien | 1802 | 1885 | France | | |
| Ivor Mairants | 1908 | 1988 | United Kingdom | | Born in Poland and moved to England at a young age |
| Gui Mallon | 1953 | | | | |
| Gian Francesco Malipiero | 1882 | 1973 | Italy | | |
| Riccardo Malipiero | 1914 | 2003 | Italy | | |
| Ursula Mamlok | 1928 | 2016 | United States | | Born in Germany. |
| Henry Mancini | 1924 | 1994 | | | |
| Joan Manén | 1883 | 1971 | Spain | | |
| Daan Manneke | 1939 | | Netherlands | | |
| Tomás Marco | 1942 | | Spain | | |
| Tera de Marez Oyens | 1932 | 1996 | Netherlands | | |
| Franco Margola | 1908 | 1992 | Italy | | |
| Heinrich Marschner | 1795 | 1861 | Germany | | |
| Ingram Marshall | 1942 | 2022 | United States | | |
| Frank Martin | 1890 | 1974 | Switzerland | | Re-located to the Netherlands in 1946. |
| Giovanni Battista Martini | 1706 | 1784 | Italy | | |
| Jean Paul Egide Martini | 1741 | 1816 | Germany | | |
| Tauno Marttinen | 1912 | 2008 | Finland | | |
| Wenzel Thomas Matiegka | 1773 | 1830 | Bohemia | | |
| Colin Matthews | 1946 | | | | |
| Nicholas Maw | 1935 | 2009 | United Kingdom | | |
| John McCabe | 1939 | 2015 | United Kingdom | | |
| Edward McGuire | 1948 | | United Kingdom | | |
| Gordon McPherson | 1965 | | United Kingdom | | |
| Chiel Meijering | 1954 | | Netherlands | | |
| Jean-Racine Meissonnier | 1794 | 1856 | France | | |
| Wilfrid Mellers | 1914 | 2008 | United Kingdom | | |
| Usko Meriläinen | 1930 | 2004 | Finland | | |
| Caspar Joseph Mertz | 1806 | 1856 | Hungary | | |
| Josep Mestres Quadreny | 1929 | 2021 | Spain | | |
| John Metcalfe | 1964 | | | | |
| Francisco Mignone | 1897 | 1986 | Brazil | | |
| Georges Migot | 1891 | 1976 | France | | |
| Darius Milhaud | 1892 | 1974 | France | | |
| Ronaldo Miranda | 1948 | | Brazil | | |
| Behzad Mirkhani | 1969 | | | | |
| Akira Miyoshi | 1933 | 2013 | Japan | | |
| Luis Manuel Molina | 1959 | | Cuba | | |
| Francesco Molino | 1768 | 1847 | Italy | | |
| Simon Molitor | 1766 | 1848 | | | |
| Federico Mompou | 1893 | 1987 | Spain | | |
| François Morel | 1926 | 2018 | Canada | | |
| Jorge Morel | 1931 | 2021 | Argentina | | |
| Federico Moreno Torroba | 1891 | 1982 | Spain | | |
| Ennio Morricone | 1928 | 2020 | Italy | | |
| Robert Morris | 1943 | | | | |
| Virgilio Mortari | 1902 | 1993 | Italy | | |
| Luigi Mosca | 1775 | 1824 | Italy | | |
| Carlos Moscardini | 1958 | | Argentina | | |
| Ricardo Moyano | 1961 | | Argentina | | |
| José Muñoz Molleda | 1905 | 1988 | Spain | | |
| Tristan Murail | 1947 | | France | | |
| Thea Musgrave | 1928 | | United Kingdom | | Re-located to the United States in 1972. |
| Olli Mustonen | 1967 | | Finland | | |
| Wolfgang Muthspiel | 1965 | | Austria | | |
| Stanley Myers | 1930 | 1993 | United Kingdom | | |
| Jiro Nakano | 1902 | 2000 | Japan | | |
| Lior Navok | 1971 | | Israel | | |
| Ernesto Nazareth | 1863 | 1934 | Brazil | | |
| Wilhelm Neuland | 1806 | 1889 | Germany | | |
| Ulrik Neumann | 1918 | 1994 | Sweden | | |
| Dimitri Nicolau | 1946 | 2008 | Italy | | Born in Greece. |
| Michael Nicolella | 1963 | | | | |
| Tage Nielsen | 1929 | 2003 | Denmark | | |
| Alfred Nieman | 1913 | 1997 | United Kingdom | | |
| Kai Nieminen | 1953 | | Finland | | |
| Joaquin Nin-Culmell | 1908 | 2004 | Spain | | |
| Marlos Nobre | 1939 | 2024 | Brazil | | |
| Paulinho Nogueira | 1929 | 2003 | Brazil | | |
| Pehr Henrik Nordgren | 1944 | 2008 | Finland | | |
| Per Nørgård | 1932 | 2025 | Denmark | | |
| Ib Nørholm | 1931 | 2019 | Denmark | | |
| Bayan Northcott | 1940 | 2022 | United Kingdom | | |
| Christopher Norton | 1953 | | New Zealand | | |
| Jan Novák | 1921 | 1984 | Czechoslovakia | | |
| Johann Abraham Nüske | 1796 | 1865 | Germany | | |
| Jana Obrovska | 1930 | 1987 | Czechoslovakia | | |
| Helmut Oehring | 1961 | | Germany | | |
| Maurice Ohana | 1914 | 1992 | | | |
| Jane O'Leary | 1946 | | Ireland | | |
| Stephen Oliver | 1950 | 1992 | United Kingdom | | |
| Poul Rovsing Olsen | 1922 | 1982 | Denmark | | |
| Marco Oppedisano | 1971 | | United States | | |
| Julián Orbón | 1925 | 1991 | United States | | Born in Spain and worked in Cuba till 1964. |
| Juan Orrego-Salas | 1919 | 2019 | Chile | | |
| Ivan Padovec | 1800 | 1873 | Croatia | | |
| Niccolò Paganini | 1782 | 1840 | Italy | | |
| Manuel Palau Boix | 1893 | 1967 | Spain | | |
| Boris Papandopulo | 1906 | 1991 | Croatia | | |
| Sophocles Papas | 1893 | 1986 | Greece | | Re-located to the United States in 1914. |
| Åke Parmerud | 1953 | | | | |
| Apostolos Paraskevas | 1964 | | Greece | | |
| Stephen Paulus | 1949 | 2014 | United States | | |
| Carlos Pedrell | 1878 | 1941 | Uruguay | | |
| Felipe Pedrell | 1841 | 1922 | Spain | | |
| Ferdinand Pelzer | 1801 | 1860 | Germany | | Re-located to England in 1829. |
| Andreas Paolo Perger | 1970 | | | | |
| Nick Peros | 1963 | | | | |
| Vincent Persichetti | 1915 | 1987 | United States | | |
| Jean-Louis Petit | 1937 | | France | | |
| Pierre Petit | 1922 | 2000 | France | | |
| Goffredo Petrassi | 1904 | 2003 | Italy | | |
| Pietro Pettoletti | 1795 | 1870 | Italy | | Years of birth and death are approximate. |
| Ástor Piazzolla | 1921 | 1992 | Argentina | | |
| Richard Pick | 1915 | 2001 | | | |
| C. A. Pinto Fonseca | 1933 | 2006 | Brazil | | |
| Lina Pires de Campos | 1918 | 2003 | Brazil | | |
| Thomas Pitfield | 1903 | 1999 | United Kingdom | | |
| Pixinguinha | 1898 | 1973 | Brazil | | |
| Kenneth Platts | 1946 | 1989 | United Kingdom | | |
| Fotis Polymeris | 1920 | 2013 | Greece | | |
| Manuel Ponce | 1882 | 1948 | Mexico | | |
| Ennio Porrino | 1910 | 1959 | Italy | | |
| Pierre Jean Porro | 1750 | 1831 | France | | |
| Francis Poulenc | 1899 | 1963 | France | | |
| Baden Powell | 1937 | 2000 | Brazil | | |
| Mel Powell | 1923 | 1998 | | | |
| José Antônio de Almeida Prado | 1943 | 2010 | Brazil | | |
| Catharina Pratten | 1821 | 1895 | Germany | | |
| Stanko Prek | 1915 | 1999 | Slovenia | | |
| Ida Presti | 1924 | 1967 | France | | |
| André Previn | 1929 | 2019 | United States | | Born in Germany. |
| Claudio Prieto | 1934 | 2015 | Spain | | |
| Teresa Procaccini | 1934 | | Italy | | |
| Emilio Pujol | 1886 | 1980 | Spain | | |
| Maximo Diego Pujol | 1957 | | Argentina | | |
| John Purser | 1942 | | United Kingdom | | |
| Eduard Pütz | 1911 | 2000 | Germany | | |
| Veli-Matti Puumala | 1965 | | Finland | | |
| Relly Raffman | 1921 | 1988 | United States | | |
| Osmo Tapio Räihälä | 1964 | | Finland | | |
| Tomi Räisänen | 1976 | | Finland | | |
| Štěpán Rak | 1945 | | Czechoslovakia | | |
| Ariel Ramírez | 1921 | 2010 | Argentina | | |
| Luis Felipe Ramón y Rivera | 1913 | 1993 | Venezuela | | |
| Primoz Ramovs | 1921 | 1999 | Slovenia | | |
| Einojuhani Rautavaara | 1928 | 2016 | Finland | | |
| Alan Rawsthorne | 1905 | 1971 | United Kingdom | | |
| Irma Ravinale | 1937 | 2013 | Italy | | |
| Jean-Marie Raymond | 1949 | | France | | |
| Gardner Read | 1913 | 2005 | United States | | |
| Ferdinand Rebay | 1880 | 1953 | Austria | | |
| Max Reger | 1873 | 1916 | Germany | | |
| Giulio Regondi | 1822 | 1872 | Switzerland | | Mostly active in the United Kingdom. |
| Steve Reich | 1936 | | United States | | |
| Dilermando Reis | 1916 | 1977 | Brazil | | |
| Ottorino Respighi | 1879 | 1936 | | | |
| Hermann Reutter | 1900 | 1985 | Germany | | |
| Roger Reynolds | 1934 | | | | |
| Alan Ridout | 1934 | 1996 | | | |
| Rodrigo Riera | 1923 | 1999 | Venezuela | | |
| Terry Riley | 1935 | | United States | | |
| Anthony Ritchie | 1960 | | New Zealand | | |
| John Ritchie | 1921 | 2014 | New Zealand | | |
| Carlos Rafael Rivera | 1970 | | United States | | |
| Jean Rivier | 1896 | 1987 | France | | |
| George Rochberg | 1918 | 2005 | | | |
| Arturo Rodas | 1954 | | Ecuador | | |
| Joaquín Rodrigo | 1901 | 1999 | Spain | | |
| Betty Roe | 1930 | | United Kingdom | | |
| Amadeo Roldán | 1900 | 1939 | Cuba | | |
| Alessandro Rolla | 1757 | 1841 | Italy | | |
| Celedonio Romero | 1913 | 1996 | Cuba | | Re-located to the United States in 1957. |
| Ludovico Roncalli | 1654 | 1713 | Italy | | |
| Ned Rorem | 1923 | 2022 | United States | | |
| Christopher Rouse | 1949 | 2019 | United States | | |
| Albert Roussel | 1869 | 1937 | France | | |
| Alec Rowley | 1892 | 1958 | United Kingdom | | |
| Miklós Rózsa | 1907 | 1995 | Hungary | | Active in several countries. |
| Marcel Rubin | 1905 | 1995 | Austria | | |
| Poul Ruders | 1949 | | Denmark | | |
| Antonio Ruiz-Pipò | 1934 | 1998 | France | | |
| Henrik Rung | 1807 | 1871 | Denmark | | |
| John Rutter | 1945 | | | | |
| Jarmo Saari | 1970 | | Finland | | |
| Kaija Saariaho | 1952 | 2023 | Finland | | |
| Sabicas | 1912 | 1990 | Spain | | Also active in Mexico and the United States. |
| Arturo Sacchetti | 1941 | | Italy | | |
| Julio Salvador Sagreras | 1879 | 1942 | Argentina | | |
| Eduardo Sainz de la Maza | 1903 | 1982 | Spain | | |
| Regino Sainz de la Maza | 1896 | 1981 | Spain | | |
| Adolfo Salazar | 1890 | 1958 | Spain | | |
| Luis H. Salgado | 1903 | 1977 | Ecuador | | |
| Aulis Sallinen | 1935 | | Finland | | |
| Erkki Salmenhaara | 1941 | 2002 | Finland | | |
| Esa-Pekka Salonen | 1958 | | Finland | | |
| Matilde Salvador | 1918 | 2007 | Spain | | |
| Gustave Samazeuilh | 1877 | 1967 | France | | |
| Luis Sandi | 1905 | 1996 | Mexico | | |
| Sven-David Sandström | 1942 | 2019 | Sweden | | |
| Cláudio Santoro | 1919 | 1989 | Brazil | | |
| Guido Santórsola | 1904 | 1994 | Brazil | | |
| Turibio Santos | 1940 | | Brazil | | |
| Heikki Sarmanto | 1939 | | Finland | | |
| Henri Sauguet | 1901 | 1989 | France | | |
| Manuel Saumell | 1810 | 1870 | Cuba | | |
| Robert Saxton | 1953 | | United Kingdom | | |
| Giacinto Scelsi | 1905 | 1988 | Italy | | |
| R. Murray Schafer | 1933 | 2021 | Canada | | |
| Gerhard Schedl | 1957 | 2000 | Austria | | |
| Armin Schibler | 1921 | 1986 | Switzerland | | |
| Peter Schickele | 1935 | 2024 | | | |
| Thomas Daniel Schlee | 1957 | 2025 | Austria | | |
| Annette Schlünz | 1964 | | Germany | | |
| Arnold Schoenberg | 1874 | 1951 | Austria | | Re-located to the United States in 1934. |
| Franz Schubert | 1797 | 1828 | | | |
| Gunther Schuller | 1925 | 2015 | | | |
| Joseph Schwantner | 1943 | | United States | | |
| Kurt Schwertsik | 1935 | | | | |
| Ludvig Schytte | 1848 | 1909 | Denmark | | Re-located to Germany in 1884 and to Austria in 1886. |
| Cyril Scott | 1879 | 1970 | United Kingdom | | |
| Peter Sculthorpe | 1929 | 2014 | Australia | | |
| Humphrey Searle | 1915 | 1982 | United Kingdom | | |
| Leif Segerstam | 1944 | 2024 | Finland | | |
| Andrés Segovia | 1893 | 1987 | Spain | | |
| Matyas Seiber | 1905 | 1960 | Hungary | | Re-located to England in 1935. |
| Ernest Shand | 1868 | 1924 | United Kingdom | | |
| Alexander Shchetynsky | 1960 | | Ukraine | | |
| Jean Sibelius | 1865 | 1957 | Finland | | |
| Roberto Sierra | 1953 | | Puerto Rico | | |
| Larry Sitsky | 1934 | | Australia | | |
| Fredrik Sixten | 1962 | | | | |
| Howard Skempton | 1947 | | United Kingdom | | |
| Reginald Smith Brindle | 1917 | 2003 | United Kingdom | | |
| Vicente Emilio Sojo | 1887 | 1974 | Venezuela | | |
| Charles Michael Alexis Sola | 1786 | 1857 | | | |
| Padre Antonio Soler | 1729 | 1783 | Spain | | |
| Harry Somers | 1925 | 1999 | Canada | | |
| Fernando Sor | 1778 | 1839 | Spain | Introduction and Variations on a Theme by Mozart | |
| Bent Sørensen | 1958 | | | | |
| Michalis Souyioul | 1906 | 1958 | Greece | | |
| Frank Lee Sprague | 1958 | 2018 | United States | | |
| Pieter van der Staak | 1930 | 2007 | Netherlands | | |
| Hans Stadlmair | 1929 | 2019 | Austria | | |
| Robert Starer | 1924 | 2001 | United States | | Born in Austria |
| Michael Starobin | 1956 | | | | |
| Walter Steffens | 1934 | | Germany | | |
| Pavel Steidl | 1961 | | Czechoslovakia | | |
| Roger Steptoe | 1953 | | United Kingdom | | |
| Bernard Stevens | 1916 | 1983 | United Kingdom | | |
| Ronald Stevenson | 1928 | 2015 | | | |
| Richard Stoker | 1938 | 2021 | United Kingdom | | |
| Ignace Strasfogel | 1909 | 1994 | Poland | | |
| Johann Strauss Sr. | 1804 | 1849 | Austria | | |
| Johann Strauss II | 1825 | 1899 | Austria | | |
| Soulima Stravinsky | 1910 | 1994 | Switzerland | | Re-located to the United States in 1948. |
| Aurel Stroe | 1932 | 2008 | | | |
| Rezső Sugar | 1919 | 1988 | Hungary | | |
| Carlos Surinach | 1915 | 1997 | Spain | | Re-located to the United States in 1959. |
| Giles Swayne | 1946 | | United Kingdom | | |
| Ricardo Tacuchian | 1939 | | Brazil | | |
| Germaine Tailleferre | 1892 | 1983 | | | |
| Jenő Takács | 1902 | 2005 | Austria | | |
| Yuji Takahashi | 1938 | | Japan | | |
| Toru Takemitsu | 1930 | 1996 | Japan | | |
| Joby Talbot | 1971 | | | | |
| Tan Dun | 1957 | | China | | |
| Hilary Tann | 1947 | 2023 | | | |
| Alexandre Tansman | 1897 | 1986 | | | |
| Sebastião Tapajós | 1943 | 2021 | Brazil | | |
| Francisco Tárrega | 1852 | 1909 | Spain | Gran Vals, Recuerdos de la Alhambra, Capricho arabe | |
| John Tavener | 1944 | 2013 | United Kingdom | | |
| Matthew Taylor | 1964 | | United Kingdom | | |
| Mikis Theodorakis | 1925 | 2021 | Greece | | |
| Augusta Read Thomas | 1964 | | | | |
| Virgil Thomson | 1896 | 1989 | United States | | |
| Eythor Thorlaksson | 1930 | 2018 | Iceland | | |
| Jukka Tiensuu | 1948 | | Finland | | |
| Michael Tippett | 1905 | 1998 | United Kingdom | | |
| Camillo Togni | 1922 | 1993 | Italy | | |
| Henri Tomasi | 1901 | 1971 | France | | |
| Colin Tommis | 1958 | | United Kingdom | | |
| Enrico Toselli | 1883 | 1926 | Italy | | |
| Vladimir Tošić | 1949 | | Serbia | | |
| Francesco Paolo Tosti | 1846 | 1916 | Italy | | |
| Joan Tower | 1938 | | United States | | |
| Ralph Towner | 1940 | 2026 | United States | | |
| Manfred Trojahn | 1949 | | Germany | | |
| Eldad Tsabary | 1969 | | Israel | | |
| Antonin Tucapsky | 1928 | 2014 | Czechoslovakia | | Re-located to England in 1975 |
| Joaquin Turina | 1882 | 1949 | Spain | | |
| José Luis Turina | 1952 | | Spain | | |
| Alfred Uhl | 1909 | 1992 | Austria | | |
| Erich Urbanner | 1936 | | Austria | | |
| Horacio Vaggione | 1943 | | Argentina | | |
| Alexander Varlamov | 1801 | 1848 | Russia | | |
| Pēteris Vasks | 1946 | | Latvia | | |
| Andersen Viana | 1962 | | Brazil | | |
| Lois V. Vierk | 1951 | | | | |
| Heitor Villa-Lobos | 1887 | 1959 | Brazil | Chôros No. 1; Twelve Études; Five Preludes | |
| Giulio Viozzi | 1912 | 1984 | Italy | | |
| Param Vir | 1952 | | | | |
| Olli Virtaperko | 1973 | | Finland | | |
| Claude Vivier | 1948 | 1983 | Canada | | |
| Roman Vlad | 1919 | 2013 | Italy | | Born in modern-day Ukraine. |
| Roger Craig Vogel | 1947 | | United States | | |
| Wladimir Vogel | 1896 | 1984 | | | |
| Kevin Volans | 1949 | | | | |
| Melinda Wagner | 1957 | | | | |
| Rudolf Wagner-Régeny | 1903 | 1969 | Germany | | Born in Hungary (in modern-day Romania). |
| Luise Walker | 1910 | 1998 | Austria | | |
| Errollyn Wallen | 1958 | | | | |
| Gareth Walters | 1928 | 2012 | United Kingdom | | |
| William Walton | 1902 | 1983 | United Kingdom | | |
| Johann Baptist Wanhal | 1739 | 1813 | Bohemia | | |
| Carl Maria von Weber | 1786 | 1826 | Germany | | |
| Anton Webern | 1883 | 1945 | Austria | | |
| John Weinzweig | 1913 | 2006 | Canada | | |
| Flemming Weis | 1898 | 1981 | | | |
| Ferdinand Weiss | 1932 | 2002 | Austria | | |
| Harald Weiss | 1949 | | Germany | | |
| Egon Wellesz | 1885 | 1974 | Austria | | Re-located to England in the late 1930s. |
| Eberhard Werdin | 1911 | 1991 | Germany | | |
| Richard Wernick | 1934 | 2025 | | | |
| Harri Kristian Wessman | 1949 | | Finland | | |
| Graham Whettam | 1927 | 2007 | United Kingdom | | |
| Johan Wikmanson | 1753 | 1800 | Sweden | | |
| John Williams | 1941 | | United Kingdom | | Born in Australia. |
| Mason Williams | 1938 | | | | |
| Arthur Wills | 1926 | 2020 | United Kingdom | | |
| Christopher Wilke | 1973 | | United States | Emperor Romulus Augustus, His Serious Funk; Diatribe; Never Kick a Man in a Suit | |
| Thomas Wilson | 1927 | 2001 | United Kingdom | | |
| Pierre Wissmer | 1915 | 1992 | | | |
| Charles Wuorinen | 1938 | 2020 | United States | | |
| Stavros Xarhakos | 1937 | | Greece | | |
| Narciso Yepes | 1927 | 1997 | Spain | | |
| Andrew York | 1958 | | United States | | |
| Kenneth Young | 1955 | | New Zealand | | |
| Isang Yun | 1917 | 1996 | Korea | | Re-located to Germany in 1959. |
| Atahualpa Yupanqui | 1908 | 1992 | Argentina | | |
| Jeanne Zaidel-Rudolph | 1948 | | South Africa | | |
| Marco Aurelio Zani de Ferranti | 1800 | 1878 | Italy | | |
| Frank Zappa | 1940 | 1993 | United States | Waltz for Guitar | Short (0:39) 12-tone waltz written at the age of 18. |
| Richard Zarou | 1981 | | | | |
| Friedrich Zehm | 1923 | 2007 | Germany | | |
| Milan Zelenka | 1939 | | Czechoslovakia | | |
| Jaime Mirtenbaum Zenamon | 1953 | | Bolivia | | |
| Marilyn J. Ziffrin | 1926 | 2018 | United States | | |
| Bernd Alois Zimmermann | 1918 | 1970 | Germany | | |
| Sauli Zinovjev | 1988 | | Finland | | |
