= Ricardo Moyano =

Argentine musician and composer

- Born: 1961 (age 63–64); La Rioja, Argentina
- Genres: Classical, Latin
- Occupation(s): Musician, professor
- Website: https://www.ricardomoyano.org/

Ricardo Moyano is an Argentine musician and composer. Son of Irma Capellino and Daniel Moyano, born in La Rioja, Argentina, in 1961. He has lived and worked in various countries, which has influenced the formation of his style. Playing with his friends as musicians has been and remains the preferred and main source of inspiration. Alongside his concert career he has recorded in various countries, alone and with other musicians. He lives in Istanbul and works as a guitar teacher at Yildiz University. He has a YouTube channel on which he uploads various recordings.

== Recordings ==
- Ricardo Moyano en Japon, 2016, Japan.
- Musics of Rio de la Plata vol.1, 2013, Turkey – Old tango, waltz and milonga, with Gustavo Battistessa (bandoneón).
- El Aveloriado, France, 1994
- Voyage en Amériques, France, 1996
- Marinés, Turkey, 1997
- Bésame mucho, Argentina, 1999
- YimYum, Internet, 2000
- Guitarist, Turkey, 2005
- Solissimo, Turkey, 2006
- El Chelco, Spain, 2008
- El Trino del Diablo, Germany, 1999, with Carlo Domeniconi
- Encuentros y Soledades (Argentina, with Juan Falu)
- Tango Primeur (France, 1990, with Cuarteto Cedron)
- Los Tiempos Cambian (France, 1995, with Jorge Cumbo)
- Cousins (France, 2006)
- Musica Criolla (France, 1996, with Guillermo de la Roca)
- Hands and Lips (Turkey, 1994, as a guest of Kerem Görsev)
- La Saveur de la Terre, France, 1992 (with Juan Falu)
- Encuentros y Soledades, Argentina, 1998 (with Juan Falu)
- Los Tiempos Cambian Francia, 1996, with Jorge Cumbo (quena, siku) and Gerardo di Giusto (piano)
- Trío con Guillermo de la Roca (quena, flautas) y Esteban Cáceres (guitarra, bombo, charango)
- Música Criolla Francia, 1990
- Ladino Latino, France, 2005, with [Liat Cohen]
- Orquesta de Camara de Guitarras de Masdrid, Spain, 1982 (dir. Jorge Cardoso)

Dúo de guitarras con Joseph Lipomi

- Gadjo Latino Francia 2006

Trío con Nabil Khalidi (laúd) y Liat Cohen (guitarra)

- (LiRicNa Trío)
- Cousins Francia 2006

Orquesta de Guitarras de Madrid, Spain, 1982

- Con Indio Juan (poesías)
- Instantes y Olas, Spain, 1984
- with Justine B (canto y guitarra) en preparación... España, 2009

== Other Collaborations ==
With Jorge Cardoso (dúos de guitarra), with Juan Falú (ídem), y as a soloist:

- Festival de Alsace 1992 Francia, 1994
- Internationales Gitarrenfestivalen Germany, 1994
- Guitarras del Mundo ‘95 Argentina, 1996
- Guitarras del Mundo ’98 Argentina, 1998
- Diez Años (antología de Juan Falu) Argentina, 1997

Antología de guitarristas:

- Contrastes Francia, 1992
- Paderborn Guitarfestival Alemania, 199...

With Tierra del Fuego (tango-jazz)

- Tierra del Fuego, Sexteto Francia, 1989
- Viejo, Solo y Borracho Francia, 1995

With Kerem Görsev (pianista de jazz)

- Hands and Lips Turquía, 1997

As a guest musician :

- For Murat Turquía, 1998
- With Gabriel Rivano (tangos...)
- Tradición Argentina, 1999
- With Hümeyra, (actriz y cantante turca) Beyhude Turquía, 1998
- With Joshemaria (cantante argentino) Romántico y Latino Argentina, 199...
- With Liliana Rodríguez (cantante Argentina)
- Tangos Valses y Milongas Francia, 2006
- With Osvaldo Burucua (música Argentina) Violeros Argentina 2005

Never edited :

- Begamoy Trío, France, 2006, with Gustavo Beytelmann (piano) and Minino Garay (percussion)
- Gato por Liebre, Argentina, 1997, with Gabriel Rivano (bandoneón)
