= Calatayud (surname) =

Calatayud or de Calatayud is a surname of Spanish origin. Notable people with the surname include:

- Alejo Calatayud (c. 1705–1731), Mestizo silversmith and rebel leader
- Alexis Calatayud (fl. 2018–present), American politician
- Bartolomé Calatayud (1882–1973), Spanish guitar composer
- Cala (footballer, born 1990) (full name Sergio Calatayud Lebrón), Spanish footballer
- Celedonio Calatayud (1880–1931), Spanish scientist and radiologist
- Juan Calatayud (born 1979), Spanish footballer
- Martín de Calatayud (1501–1548), Spanish Roman Catholic bishop
- Pedro de Calatayud (1689–1773), Spanish Jesuit missionary
- Santiago Calatayud (died 1526), Roman Catholic bishop
- Zulia Calatayud (born 1979), Cuban runner

== See also ==
- Calatayud, a city in Zaragoza, Spain
