= Ian Campbell Folk Group =

English folk music group

- Origin: Birmingham, England
- Genre: Folk music
- Years active: 1956–1978
- Past members: Ian Campbell; Lorna Campbell; Dave Phillips; John Chapman; Gordon McCulloch; John Dunkerley; Dave Swarbrick; Brian Clark; Mansell Davies; George Watts; Dave Pegg; Andy Smith; Mike Hadley

The Ian Campbell Folk Group were one of the most popular and respected folk groups of the British folk revival of the 1960s. The group made many appearances on radio, television, and at national and international venues and festivals. They performed a mixture of British traditional folk music and new material, including compositions by Campbell. Much of their popularity flowed from the variety of their performance which included a mixture of solos, group vocals and instrumentals.

== History ==
The group formed in 1956 in Birmingham, as the Clarion Skiffle Group. The band was renamed the Ian Campbell Folk Group in 1958 and became one of the most respected, popular and influential folk groups of the British folk scene of the 1960s. The group's first recordings included the EP, Ceilidh at the Crown, which was released in 1962 and was the first live folk club recording to be released on vinyl. During this period Spencer Davis (12 string guitar) and Christine Perfect (piano) performed with them before pursuing separate careers.

In 1963, they signed to Transatlantic Records and released their first studio album, This is The Ian Campbell Folk Group. The group made television appearances throughout the 1960s including Hootenanny Show, Barn Dance and Hullabaloo. They established a substantial audience and played concerts at the Royal Albert Hall and the Royal Festival Hall and at the Newport Folk Festival in 1964. In 1965, their version of Bob Dylan's "The Times They Are a-Changin'" reached No. 42 in the UK Singles Chart.

The group found two new members in 1977 when Ian's sister Lorna separated from her husband Brian Clark, who had been a singer and guitarist in the group since 1963. These two were Aiden Forde and Colin Tommis. The band continued to perform across Britain and in Scandinavia, appearing several times on BBC Radio 2 shows and Pebble Mill at One. Adam's Rib, an album of Campbell's songs, was re-recorded in Copenhagen with guest musicians in 1979. Mike Hadley and Andy Smith continued to play with them and Neil Cox joined for their tour of North America.

On 8 February 2012, at the BBC Radio 2 Folk Awards in Salford, Campbell received the 'Good Tradition' Award, presented by Stuart Maconie, for Campbell's outstanding contribution to folk music over five decades. He died later that year, on 24 November 2012, from cancer.

He was the father of UB40 musicians; Ali, Robin and Duncan Campbell, as well as folk singer David Campbell.

== Band members ==
- Ian Campbell – guitar, jews harp, vocals (1956–1978; died 2012)
- Lorna Campbell – vocals (1956–1978)
- Dave Phillips – guitar (1956–1963)
- Gordon McCulloch – banjo (1956–1959)
- John Dunkerley – banjo, guitar, accordion (1959–1976; died 1977)
- Dave Swarbrick – fiddle, mandola (1960–1966; died 2016)
- Brian Clark – guitar, vocals (1963–1978)
- Mansell Davies – bass (1966–1968)
- George Watts – flute (1966–1968)
- Dave Pegg – bass guitar, mandolin (1968–1971)
- Andy Smith – banjo, mandolin, guitar, fiddle (1969–1971)
- Mike Hadley – double bass (1971–1976)
- Geoff Bodenham: acoustic guitar
- Derek Craft: flute, piano

== Partial discography ==
- 1962: Ceilidh at the Crown : Topic TOP76 EP
- 1962: Songs of Protest : Topic TOP82 EP
- 1963: The Sun is Burning / The crow on the cradle : Topic Stop102 Single
- 1963: This Is the Ian Campbell Folk Group! : Transatlantic TRA 110 LP
  - 1964: Re-released as Presenting the Ian Campbell Folk Group : Contour 2870 314
- 1964: Across the Hills : Transatlantic TRA 118 LP
- 1965: Coaldust Ballads : Transatlantic TRA 123 LP
- 1966: Contemporary Campbells : Transatlantic TRA 137 LP
- 1967: New Impressions : Transatlantic TRA 151 LP
- 1968: The Circle Game : Transatlantic TRA 163 LP
- 1969: Ian Campbell and the Ian Campbell Folk Group with Dave Swarbrick : Music for Pleasure, MFP Stereo 1349 LP
- 1971: The Sun Is Burning : ARGO ZFB 13 LP
- 1972: Something To Sing About : PYE PKL 5506 LP
- 1974: Live : Sonnet SPL 1967 LP
- 1976: Adam's Rib: Lorna Campbell Sings the Songs of Ian Campbell : Cottage COT. 701 LP
- 1993: And Another Thing: Songs from Ian Campbell : Celtic Music CM CD 070

In 2009, The Sun is Burning, from the single of the same name, was included in Topic Records 70-year anniversary boxed set Three Score and Ten as track three on the fifth CD.
