= Ferdinand Weiss =

Romanian collaborative pianist and professor

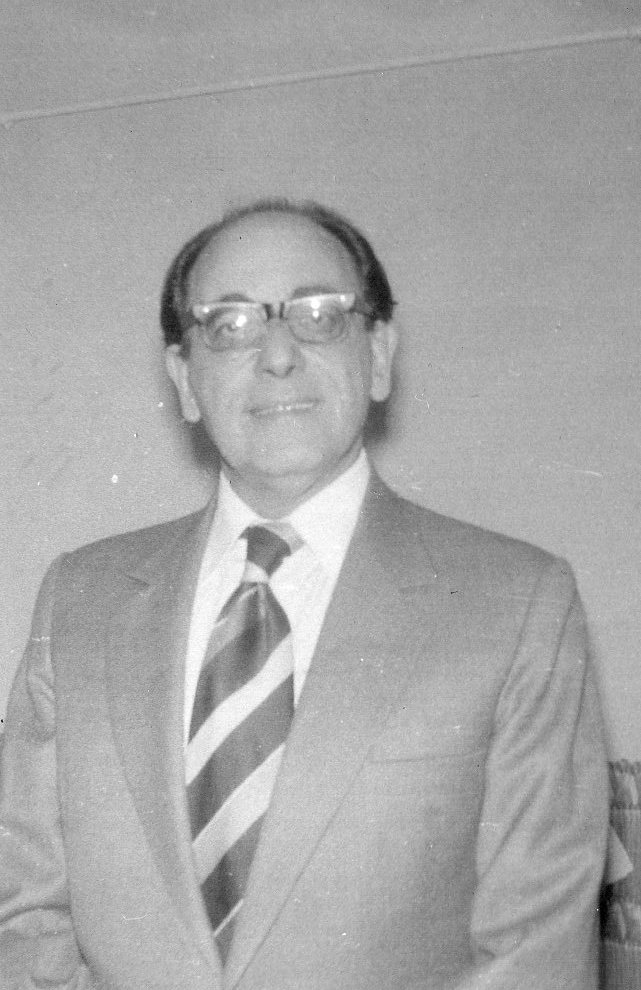
Ferdinand Weiss

Ferdinand Weiss (February 13, 1932 in Timișoara – January 13, 2002 in Cluj-Napoca) was a Romanian collaborative pianist and a professor at the Gheorghe Dima Music Academy of Cluj-Napoca, Romania.

== Education ==
He received a degree in piano from the Gheorghe Dima Music Academy of Cluj-Napoca, Romania, where he studied piano with professor Gh. Halmos, harmony with prof. M. Eisikovits, composition with prof. S. Toduta and conducting with prof. A. Ciolan.

== Awards ==
- The Viotti International Competition (Vercelli – Italy), 1957.
- The Order of Cultural Merit, 1970.
- A.T.M. Prize for Artistic Mastery, 1987.
- The Mihail Jora Musical Critics’ Prize of A Lifetime Dedicated to Music, 1995.

== Artistic career ==
As a pianist Weiss performed in over 1500 recitals all over the world (Europe, America, Asia), accompanying well-known soloists, such as the violinists Andrei Agoston, Mihaela Martin, Ștefan Ruha and Ion Voicu, and the singers Alexandru Agache, Liliana Bizineche, Ion Buzea, Elena Cernei, Ileana Cotrubaș, Dan Iordachescu, Marta Kessler, Ionel Pantea, Emilia Petrescu, Ion Piso, Edita Simon and Julia Tözser-Varadi. Ferdinand Weiss also performed with world-famous guests on Romanian stages, such as Ayhan Baran, Lola Bobesco, Ivry Gitlis, Ruggiero Ricci, Henryk Szeryng, and Gioconda de Vito. Together with these remarkable artists, Weiss excelled in a wide-ranging repertoire enriched by a number of first performances.

== Recordings ==
- The Radio Studios of Bucharest and Cluj-Napoca
- Concert recordings in: USSR, Bulgaria, Yugoslavia, Hungary, Poland, East and West Germany, Austria, England, Italy, Spain, Japan, the US, Mexico.
- The Electrecord Records
- The Recording Archive of the Gheorghe Dima Music Academy of Cluj-Napoca, Romania

== Teaching activity ==
Over a period of more than 40 years in the Gheorghe Dima Music Academy of Cluj-Napoca, Ferdinand Weiss taught chamber music and music theory, and he contributed pedagogically to the following courses:

- Comparative interpretive analysis – a method of training and assessment designed for performers
- Introductory exercises in score reading practice

"(…) There was a time when Ferdinand Weiss was the foremost accompanying pianist of Romania. The best soloists of the country were thrilled with the opportunity of being accompanied by him on stages of concert halls or in front of the microphones of the radio stations and recording halls, at home and abroad. And when some of the greatest soloists of the world – such as Henryk Szeryng and Ruggiero Ricci – came to Romania, the national concert agency strongly recommended him as a playing partner for their recitals. While having superior artistic and teaching experience, he had the ever-present ability to convey to his students his admiration for masterpieces and for the standards of interpretive mastery.

His classes were like an exercise on belief in music. (…)" - Francisc Laszlo, Steaua, February 2002

== Reviews across the country ==
- "Ferdinand Weiss cannot be called a mere accompanist. He plays with dedication even when his interventions are reduced. Nothing, not even the simplest sounds are overlooked, they always express something." - Ada Brumaru, Scânteia, June 1958
- "Ferdinand Weiss, a collaborative pianist of great value, was again capable of providing the soloist with an ideal support. In the Beethoven sonata his contribution had a unique artistic quality. There were moments of art that only the best interpreters of chamber music are able to create." - Radu Gheciu on the Recital with Ruggiero Ricci, Informația, September 1960
- "One of the climaxes of the recital was Prokofiev’s Sonata no. II, interpreted with great fantasy, full of verve and vitality, that resonated in the inspired interpretation of Szeryng and of the excellent pianinst and musician Ferdinand Weiss, with unrelenting and charming spontaneity." - E. Elian in the George Enescu Festival, 'Informația, September 1964
- "(…) Concerning the pianist Ferdinand Weiss (I am also referring to the sonata recital with Gioconda de Vito) I strengthened my conviction that we have in him one of our top quality musicians, who demonstrates us the level of artistry that can be reached in piano accompanying." - Alfred Hofman, Contemporanul, June 1960

== Reviews abroad ==
- "(…) Ferdinand Weiss is more than an accompanist (…)" - London, The Times, April 1958
- "Ferdinand Weiss accompanied superbly in all styles." - London, Daily Telegraph, April 1958
- "Ferdinand Weiss is one of the best chamber music pianists that I have heard lately. He is indisputably an artist of international stature." - Tokyo, Tokyo Shimbun, decembrie 1960
- "Lucky is the violinist who has such a partner as the pianist Ferdinand Weiss." - West Germany, Zeitung der Nation, October 1961
- "The accompaniment of the pianist Ferdinand Weiss was of lofty perfection." - Bern, Neue Berner Zeitung, October 1959
- "Ferdinand Weiss is a brilliant partner and a wonderful pianist able to blend with the violin, giving birth to an extraordinary ensemble." - Moscow, Sovetskaya Kultura, April 1963
- "In Ferdinand Weiss I recognized a colourist "par excellence" (…)" - Germany, Neueste Nachrichten, April 1965
- "Meeting again the excellent pianist and musician Ferdinand Weiss reconfirmed his impeccable taste and rare sensitivity." - Tokyo, April 1968
- "(…) We were impressed by the artistic sensibility and the wonderful touch of Ferdinand Weiss." - Vienna, Arbeiter Zeitung, August 1972
- "Every key, phrase, melodic line by Ferdinand Weiss revealed an excellent chamber music pianist." - U.S.A., Washington Post, December 1972
