= Ana Falú =

Argentine architect and social activist

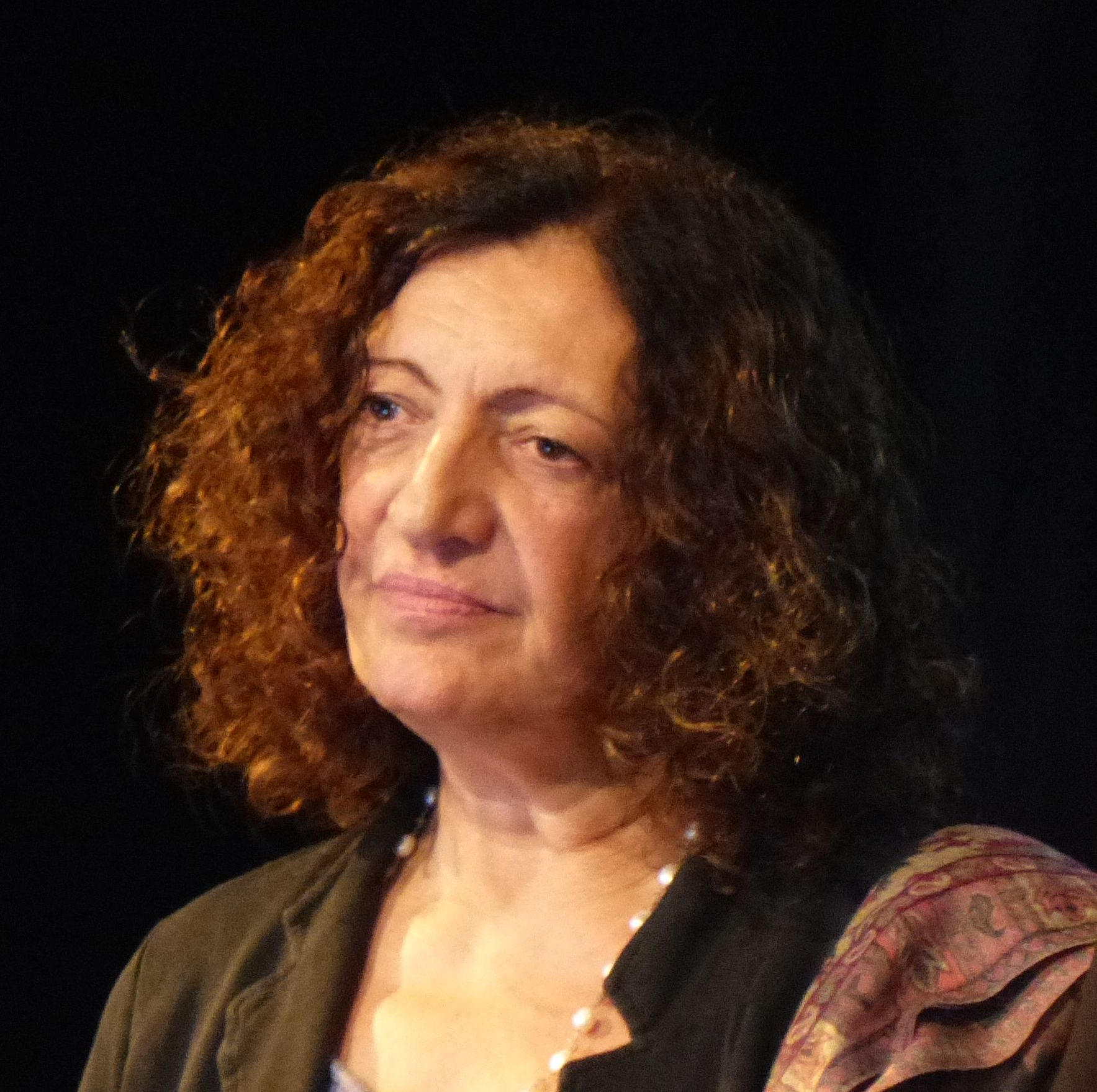
- Born: Ana María Falú; 1947 (age 78–79); San Miguel de Tucumán, Argentina
- Education: Delft University of Technology
- Occupation: Architect
- Employer: National University of Córdoba
- Relatives: Juan Falú (brother); Luis Eduardo Falú (brother); Jose Ricardo Falú (brother)

Ana María Falú (born 1947) is an Argentine architect and a social activist for human rights and for women's rights. She has been Regional Director of the United Nations Development Fund for Women (UNIFEM; now part of UN Women) for the Andean Region (2002–2004) and for Brazil and the Southern Cone Countries (2004–2009). She is a researcher and Professor at the National University of Córdoba (UNC), where she is the Director of the Housing and Habitat Research Institute (INVIHAB). In the field of feminist action, she promoted numerous institutional initiatives and contributed to the establishment of women's rights to the city, to housing, and to the habitat. She is co-founder of the Women and Habitat Network of Latin America, of the Centro de Intercambio y Servicios para el Cono Sur Argentina (CISCSA), of UNC's Interdisciplinary Program of Women's and Gender Studies (PIEMG), and of Articulación Feminista Marcosur, among other areas of action in favor of women's rights. In 2013 she won the Feminist Career Award together with other Argentine women.

== Early years ==
Ana Falú was born in San Miguel de Tucumán in 1947, the granddaughter of Syrian immigrants. She is the sister of singer Juan Falú, disappeared student activist Luis Eduardo Falú, and lawyer and politician Dr. Jose Ricardo Falú. She studied architecture at the National University of Tucumán's Faculty of Architecture and graduated a few months before the 1976 coup d'état. This event marked her life, as she had to leave the country, along with her husband and two children, traveling first to Brazil and then, because of Operation Condor, to the Netherlands. Falú became involved in politics as a student, through groups interested in the living conditions of the poorest sectors of the population, visiting towns and neighborhoods without conditions of habitability. This helped her to start work on social housing and habitat conditions. In her final year's project she developed some houses for a sugar cooperative in which she also proposed using low-cost technologies such as cane bagasse as a material to make prefabricated panels.

== Career ==
In the Netherlands, Falú completed a Diploma in Social Housing at the TU Delft Faculty of Architecture's Department of International Studies. She continued to study precarious and informal settlements, focusing on issues related to land tenure, services and infrastructures. Her thesis was titled Low Income Housing and Infrastructure.

At TU Delft, she worked as a teacher in a section of the Architecture faculty called the "Third World". At this institution she would complete her doctoral thesis on social housing in the Netherlands.

In the early 1980s she moved to Ecuador on a Dutch international cooperation technical assignment. The combination of different experiences made her start working with the relationship between woman and habitat. The cooperation assignment comprised the construction of residential villas in the Ecuadorian Amazon basin for the families of oil workers. This work was done jointly with Fernando Chaves and Carlos Ríos, who managed the construction system with wood from the area, and she was in charge of managing the project.

Falú's years in Ecuador were marked by intense feminist activism. She connected with the feminist movement in the country, with those who went to the first meetings of feminist women in Latin America and the Caribbean. Since then her activism has crossed into all aspects of her professional and personal life. The implications of feminism gave rise to other issues, and she met with María Arboleda in a study group to construct a conceptual theoretical framework of women and habitat. Over years they worked to implement policies for a city without violence against women. Working with the United Nations, she met with governments and especially women's organizations throughout Latin America, which led her to being invited to direct the UNIFEM Andean Region, a post she held from 2002 to 2004, and for Brazil and the Southern Cone Countries from 2004 to 2009. Her position at the UN allowed her to establish more than 10 programs in the region, one of the most important being Safe Cities for Women, Safe Cities for All. This was a pioneering effort which served to inspire other global programs.

In 2009 she returned to Córdoba to do research and work at UNC, where she teaches and directs the Faculty of Architecture and Urbanism's Housing and Habitat Research Institute.

Falú has maintained her connection with the United Nations, and she is currently the coordinator of UN-Habitat's gender advisory group.

== Works ==
- Falú, Ana; Carmona, Marisa, eds. (2001). Globalización Forma urbana y Gobernabilidad [Globalization Urban Form and Governance] (in Spanish). Córdoba: TU Delft, National University of Córdoba, Housing and Habitat Research Institute. Printed by UNC. ISBN 9875440264.
- Falú, Ana, ed. (2002). Ciudades para varones y mujeres. Herramientas para la acción [Cities for Men and Women. Tools for Action] (in Spanish). CISCSA-UNIFEM Latin American Women and Habitat Network.
- Falú, Ana; Morey, Patricia; Rainero, Liliana, eds. (2002). Ciudad y vida cotidiana. Asimetrías en el uso del tiempo y del espacio [City and Daily Life. Asymmetries in the Use of Time and Space] (in Spanish). Córdoba: SECYT-UNC. ISBN 9503303567.
- Carmona, Marisa; Falú, Ana; Muga, Eliana, eds. (2007). Bordes e intersticios urbanos impacto de la globalización [Borders and Urban Interstices Impact of Globalization] (in Spanish). TU Delft, National University of Córdoba, University of Valparaíso. ISBN 978-9081195218.
- Falú, Ana; Segovia, Olga, eds. (2007). Ciudades para convivir [Cities for Living Together] (in Spanish). Santiago: Ediciones Sur. ISBN 9789562080774.
- Falú, Ana, ed. (2008). Retratos de las desigualdades [Portraits of Inequalities] (in Spanish). Brazil: Instituto de Pesquisa Económica Aplicada (IPEA), UNIFEM.
- Falú, Ana, ed. (2009). Women in the city on Violence and Rights. Chile: Women and Habitat Network of Latin America – Editions Sur. ISBN 9789562080866.
