= Rudolf Dašek =

Czech guitarist

Rudolf Dašek (27 August 1933 – 1 February 2013) was a Czech guitarist.

== Biography ==
A native of Prague, Dašek studied at the Prague Conservatory from 1962 to 1966 with Milan Zelenka. He was a member of the band SHQ led by Karel Velebný. He was in several bands for the rest of the 1960s: a trio with George Mraz, a trio with Lou Bennett, the quintet Jazz Cellula led by Ladislav Déczi, an orchestra conducted by Gustav Brom, and the Prague Radio Symphony Orchestra. At the end of the decade he worked for two years in the house band at the Blue Note Club in Berlin, Germany. In the early 1970s he formed the duo System Tandem with Jiří Stivín. He also worked with guitarists Philip Catherine, Christian Escoudé, and Toto Blanke.
