= Per-Olov Kindgren =

- Born: 10 June 1956 (age 69); Bogotá, Colombia
- Origin: Stockholm, Sweden
- Genres: Classical
- Occupation(s): Guitarist, Composer and Music teacher
- Instrument: Classical guitar
- Labels: Per-Olov Kindgren Music Online
- Website: www.per-olovkindgren.com

Per-Olov Kindgren (born 10 June 1956 in Bogotá, Colombia) is a Swedish classical guitarist, composer and music teacher known for his classical guitar playing, ranging from Bach to The Beatles.

== Biography ==
=== Early life ===
Kindgren was born in Bogotá, Colombia, to a Swedish father and a Danish mother. Kindgren's father, Owe, an engineer, worked for the Colombian branch of LM Ericsson installing telephone stations. The family returned to Stockholm when Kindgren was three years old. He lived there from 1960 until 1970. At the age of six, Kindgren was fascinated by a bright red electric guitar in a shop window. The Beatles became his heroes, and he especially admired Paul McCartney. His parents gave him a classical guitar for his seventh birthday. In 1970 he saw a documentary about John Williams broadcast on Danish national television. When Kindgren was 14 years old, his family moved to the border town of Helsingør in Denmark. There he was able to attend a Swedish high school in Helsingborg, where he met his first classical guitar teacher, Torvald Nilsson.

=== Professional life ===
In 1976 Kindgren began to study at The Royal Danish Academy of Music in Copenhagen, where he moved during his studies and where he lives and works today. He studied there for 7 years with professor Per-Olof Johnson until his graduation in 1983. While continuing his studies, he became a music teacher, teaching at music schools in Vallensbæk and Gentofte for 24 years. Presently Kindgren works as a music teacher at the music school in Gentofte, which provides him with a steady living in addition to the concerts he performs.

In 1979 he joined three other guitarists, Steffen Broe Christensen, Dag Egil Berge and Torsten Borbye Nielsen, and formed the Nordic Guitar Quartet, which performed more than 400 concerts throughout its existence and also recorded an album called: Images .. with arrangements to A.Vivaldi, M. Ravel, and JS Bach from TB Nielsen. Kindgren composes pieces for solo guitar, as well as for duets, trios, quartets, and up to septets and octets for guitar. In 1998 he composed pieces for choir, orchestra, and a rock band for the 25th anniversary of the Vallensbæk music school; in 2000 he composed a Christmas Oratorio for organ, guitar, flutes, choir and narrator. In 2009, the great French guitarist and composer Jean-Marie Raymond wrote for him a beautiful piece, titled "As Always.".

== Musical style ==
Kindgren's style is mainly classical, with influences from jazz, blues, and easy listening. In addition to his classical repertoire, Kindgren also plays works of The Beatles and Metallica. Kindgren likes to describe his own compositions as songs without words.

== Gear ==
=== Instrument ===
For many years Kindgren played a classical guitar built by Swiss luthier Philippe Jean-Mairet, which he bought in 1987. A friend of his, Jørgen, had bought a guitar from the Swiss luthier, whom he had met in Bern during his studies, and loved its superb quality. Kindgren asked his friend to order a guitar for him, and nine months later he was able to visit Jean-Mairet in Switzerland to test his new guitar. Previously he owned a Martin Fleeson guitar, which he had bought in Manchester, England in 1986 for 25,000 DKK (about €3,350 or $4,400 at the time). One year later Kindgren bought his Jean-Mairet instrument.

In the summer 2006, Kindgren went to guitar builder Per Hallgren in Gråbo, near Gothenburg, in order to have the guitar French polished again. In 2009 he started to play a guitar by Per Hallgren and since then he has played several instruments by the Swedish builder.

He also plays a 7-string classical guitar given to him by John and Judy Rogerson.

=== Guitar Support ===
In his videos, Kindgren can be seen using a Gitano guitar support on his left lap.

== Discography ==
- 1992 - Images, Nordic Guitar Quartet (Primaveramusic)
- 2008 - After Silence (Villa Luisa Records)
- 2010 - Distant Love
- 2011 - AIR
- 2023 - For My Love (Feat. Jimmy Quango and Gaugolon)

=== Images: Nordic Guitar Quartet (Primaveramusic) ===
==== A. Vivaldi ====
1. Concerto Grosso Op.3 No.8: Allegro,

2. Concerto Grosso Op.3 No.8: Larghetto e Spirituoso,

3. Concerto Grosso Op.3 No.8: Allegro,

==== J.S. Bach ====
4. Orchetral Suite No.1, BWV 1066: Courante.

5. Orchetral Suite No.1, BWV 1066: Gavotte 1 and 2.

6. Orchetral Suite No.1, BWV 1066: Forlane.

7. Orchetral Suite No.1, BWV 1066: Minuet 1 and 2.

8. Orchetral Suite No.1, BWV 1066: Bourrée 1 and 2.

9. Orchetral Suite No.1, BWV 1066: Passepled 1 and 2.

==== M. Ravel ====
10. Pavane Pour Une Infante Defunte.

==== C. Machado ====
11. Dancas Populares Brasileiras: Ponteio (Agalopado)

12. Dancas Populares Brasileiras: Ciranda (Roda, Roda)

13. Dancas Populares Brasileiras: Catira (Bati Sola)

14. Dancas Populares Brasileiras: Cantiga (Minar)

15. Dancas Populares Brasileiras: Frevo (Isquenta ô pé)

==== L. Brouwer ====
16. Cuban Landscape with Rain.

==== F. Moreno Torroba ====
17. Estampas: Bailando un Fandango Charro.

18. Estampas: Remanso.

19. Estampas: La Siega.

20. Estampas: Fiesta en el Pueblo.

21. Estampas: Amanecer.

22. Estampas: La Boda.

23. Estampas: Camino del Molino.

24. Estampas: Juegos Infantiles.
