= Jana Obrovská =

Czech composer

Jana Obrovská (13 September 1930 – 4 April 1987) was a Czech composer.

== Biography ==
Jana Obrovská was born in Prague, the daughter of painter and sculptor Jakub Obrovský. Her early studies were piano with B. Kabeláčová-Rixová and theory with Jaroslav Řídký. At the Prague Conservatory she studied with M. Krejčí and Emil Hlobil from 1949-55. She won a prize in the 1972 Concours International de Guitarre in Paris for Passocaglia und Toccata. Her Hommage a Béla Bartók became compulsory in the same Paris competition in 1975. Obrovská also composed music for orchestra and chamber ensembles.

Obrovská married guitar virtuoso Milan Zelenka and the couple had a son, guitarist Vilém Zelenka (b. 1987) who often plays in a duo with his father.

== Works ==
Obrovská's compositions have been recorded and issued on CD, including:

=== Selective discography ===
- Passacaglia and Toccata for guitar, A. Artzt, Helios CD CDH88026 (1989)
- Due Musici and Concerto for Two Guitars and Orchestra, M. Zelenka and L. Brabec with Radio Symphony Orchestra Pilsen, Supraphon VT2789-2 (2018)
- Homage to Béla Bartók for guitar, R. Aussel HARMONIA MUNDI CD in MAN4802 (1992)
- Four images of Japan for guitar, Tribute to Hiroshige - Homage to Hokusai - Tribute to Utamara - Tribute to Sharaku, R. Aussel HARMONIA MUNDI CD in MAN4802

(1992)

- Preludia and Hommage a Choral Gothique for guitar, . . . A Ty Taky Jdi do Ithaky . . . , P. Steidl WILLIAM RECORDING WR001 (2013)
