= Sveinn Eythorsson =

Icelandic guitarist (born 1964)

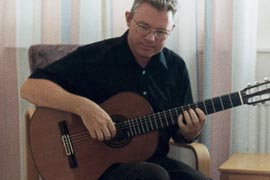

Background information
- Born: Sveinn Eyþórsson; 17 February 1964 (age 62); Hafnarfjörður, Iceland
- Genres: Classical and Jazz
- Occupations: Software developer, musician, teacher and composer
- Instrument: Guitar
- Years active: 1981–present

Sveinn Eythorsson (Icelandic: Sveinn Eyþórsson; born 17 February 1964) is an Icelandic guitarist and software developer. His parents were Sigurbjörg Sveinsdóttir, from Reykjavík and Eyþór Þorláksson from Hafnarfjörður.

Sveinn has developed the information system School Archive used by many music schools in Iceland to keep track of their students.

== Education ==
- 1981 – 1986 Conservatori de Música Isaac Albéniz, Girona, Spain. Classical guitar professor diploma.
- 1986 – 1987 F. Garrido, Barcelona, Spain. Private guitar lessons.
- 1994 – 1996 Högskolan í Skövde, Sweden. Information systems study programme.
- 1998 – 1999 Högskolan í Skövde, Sweden. BSc with specialization in information systems.

== Musical works ==
Guitar Methods
[1018] The first guitar milestone. Method for beginners. Drawings by Jean Antoine Posocco. ISBN 978-9935-446-56-5

Guitar Studies
[1066] 19 Studies. Preliminary (first four strings) with accompaniment for the teacher. ISBN 978-9935-446-57-2

Collections
[1099] Their songs. Melodies by guitar pupils, grades 1 – 3, with accompaniment for the teacher. Arr. S. Eythorsson. ISBN 978-9935-446-58-9

Compositions for Solo Guitar
[1085] 9 easy guitar pieces. ISBN 978-9935-446-59-6
[1010] Fantasy no. ISBN 978-9935-446-60-2
[1011] Fantasy no. II. ISBN 978-9935-446-61-9
[1012] Fantasy no. III. ISBN 978-9935-446-62-6
[1084] Fantasy no. IV. ISBN 978-9935-446-63-3
[1087] Fantasy no. V. ISBN 978-9935-446-64-0
[1136] Fantasy no. VI. ISBN 978-9935-446-65-7
[1203] The Mountain Stream. ISBN 978-9935-446-66-4

Duets
[2034] The search. Guitar duet. ISBN 978-9935-446-67-1
[2035] 7 jazz pieces. Melodies with chords and bass. ISBN 978-9935-446-68-8

Trios
[3015] Guitar trio no. I. ISBN 978-9935-446-69-5
[3026] Guitar trio no. II. ISBN 978-9935-446-70-1
[3023] Guitar trio no. III. ISBN 978-9935-446-71-8
[3028] Guitar trio no. IV. ISBN 978-9935-446-72-5
