= Milan Zelenka =

Czech guitarist, composer and music arranger

- Born: 1939 (age 86–87); Czechoslovakia
- Occupations: Guitarist, Teacher
- Known for: Guitar virtuoso

Milan Zelenka (born 4 June 1939) is a Czech guitarist, composer and music arranger.

== Music career ==
Zelenka was born in Czechoslovakia and studied guitar at the Prague Conservatory with Štěpán Urban. While a student, he took first place in music competitions in Moscow in 1957 and again in Vienna in 1959. After graduation, he conducted a career as a concert guitarist, appearing internationally. He also gives master classes. He is best known for arrangements of traditional Czech songs, but also commissions new works for performance. In recent years he has composed original works.

From 1963 to 1981, Zelenka worked as professor at the Prague Conservatory. Notable students include Rudolf Dašek and Pavel Steidl.

Zalenka married Czech composer Jana Obrovská and the couple had a son, Vilém (born 1987). Vilém Zelenka graduated from Czech Technical University and often plays in a guitar duo with his father.

== Discography ==
Selected works include:

- Moderní České Skladby Pro Kytaru (LP, Album, Mono), Supraphon (1970)
- Antonio Vivaldi, Joseph Haydn, Fernando Carulli, Milan Zelenka - Koncerty Pro Kytaru A Orchestr, Supraphon (1973)
- Kytarový Recitál Ze Skladeb J.S.Bacha, Supraphon (1978)
- Jana Obrovská, Věroslav Neumann, Milan Zelenka, Lubomír Brabec, Radio Symphony Orchestra Pilsen, Rostislav Hališka, Josef Chuchro, Josef Hála, Komorní Filharmonie Pardubice, Libor Pešek - Obrovská / Neumann (LP) Panton (1981)
- Paganini*, Milan Zelenka, Petr Messiereur, Evžen Rattay - Works With Guitar (LP, Album), Supraphon (1985)
- Niccolò Paganini, Milan Zelenka, Petr Messiereur, Evžen Rattay - Paganini/Works With Guitar (CD, Album), Supraphon (1990)
- Milan Zelenka, Milan Tesař - Baladické Příběhy (CD, Album, RM), Supraphon (1992)
- Homenaje A Andrés Segovia (CD, Album), Supraphon (1993)
- Milan Zelenka, Miloslav Matoušek - Guitarreo (CD, Album), Music Vars (1995)
- Guitar Recital (LP, Album), Supraphon (date unknown)
- Johann Sebastian Bach, Milan Zelenka - Gitarren-Transkriptionen (LP) (date unknown)
- Guitar Duo - Milan Zelenka & Vilem Zelenka
