= Colin Tommis =

British musician

Colin Tommis (born 1958) is a British composer, songwriter, session guitarist and teacher. He is chairman of the European Guitar Teachers Association (EGTA). His guitar music has been published by the Associated Board of the Royal Schools of Music, Chanterelle, Corda Music, Mel Bay and Bardic Edition.

Tommis started playing in folk music circles in the 1970s before joining the Ian Campbell Folk Group, with whom he worked from 1977 to 1982. In 1979, he embarked on studies of classical music with Harold Taylor, John Bache and John Woolfe (Music Director for Stratford's Royal Shakespeare Company) before graduation under the professorship of William Mathias at the University College of North Wales, Bangor. As a solo guitarist, he commissioned a new guitar sonata from Gareth Glyn and premiered pieces written especially for him by John Pickard, Jochen Eisentraut and Andy Crowdy. This last was a guitar concerto.

He founded the Anglesey Guitar Ensemble in 1993 and this became, under his leadership, a successful group of young musicians. They won two national ensemble competitions and appeared on the BBC's Blue Peter television show, before disbanding in 1997. In the late 1990s, Tommis joined the experimental band Ogam, which aimed to present traditional Welsh melodies in unusual arrangements.

Since then Tommis has collaborated with musicians such as Huw Warren, Gwyn Evans, and Lleuwen Steffan in the recording of many of his own songs. There are two CDs of Tommis' songs: The Cat Lover and Main Beam Blinded. Performances of Tommis' music have been heard in France, Australia, Canada, Argentina and Denmark.

As chair of the European Guitar Teachers Association (EGTA), Tommis has had a decisive and pivotal role in developing the National Youth Guitar Ensemble (NYGE). The NYGE has performed Tommis' ensemble music in numerous concerts across the UK. As chairman he has steered the organisation to Charitable Status.

Tommis has recently collaborated on a children's story for narrator and classical guitarist called “The Pink Feather”, for which he wrote 30 minutes of brand new solo classical guitar music. This project is now being recorded and performed at schools and festivals around the country.

== Selected works ==
- The Christmas Fantasia (1994)
- The Day She Walked Into Powys Hall (2001)
- The Cat Lover (2003)
- Main Beam Blinded (2006)
- Learning To Tie Shoelaces (2006)
- Y Felinheli (2007)
- The Pink Feather (2008)
