= Rodrigo Riera =

- Born: September 19, 1923; Near Carora, Lara, Venezuela
- Died: August 19, 1999 (aged 75) Barquisimeto, Lara, Venezuela
- Genres: Classical music, Venezuelan popular music
- Occupations: musician, guitarist, composer
- Instrument: Guitar

Rodrigo Riera (19 September 1923 – 19 August 1999), was a Venezuelan guitarist and composer. He wrote a vital and important body of works for the guitar, inspired by and dedicated to the rich musical legacy of his region in the Lara state (Capital city: Barquisimeto) in Western Venezuela, displaying a loving nationalism that led him to be associated with the work of Antonio Lauro but with a technique that is more accessible to beginners and intermediate guitar players.

He was also an important educator of the classical guitar. Many guitarists active today studied with him in the 1980s and 1990s.

Lastly, he had an important career as a concert guitarist, but his recordings are relatively scarce and hard to find.

== Biography ==
=== Family and youth ===
Rodrigo Riera was born in the township of Barrio Nuevo, in the city of Carora, in the state of Lara, in midwestern Venezuela.

His father, Juan Teodosio Querales, was a music teacher. He grew up with his mother, Paula Antonia Riera and his five older siblings. In addition to his music talent, Rodrigo inherited a congenital foot defect from his father. Despite this, he was able to have a normal childhood, even excelling in certain sports and physical activities.

Like many other Venezuelan musicians, his first instrument was the cuatro and his first teachers were his peers and his own will. His first public recital took place in Carora at age thirteen.

In 1937 he moved to Barquisimeto to look for better opportunities. In 1939, he was part of a guitar and vocal group called "Hermanos Riera" (founded by his brother Ruben). That year, he met fellow Carora guitarist Alirio Díaz, who was not planning to have a career in music at the time.

In 1941, he and his group travelled to Caracas for a series of radio presentations. During that trip, he met guitarists Antonio Lauro and Manuel Enrique Pérez Díaz, both fellow students of Raúl Borges. Lauro was so impressed with Riera's playing, that he wrote a letter recommending him to his teacher. Life's circumstances made it difficult for Riera to start studies under Borges until 1945.

=== Studying under Raúl Borges ===
In September 1945, Riera's and Alirio Díaz' paths crossed again, this time at the footsteps of the Escuela de Música de Caracas to meet and audition for the guitar classes of Raúl Borges. They graduated in 1949 with the highest of grades. In March of that year, they were introduced to Andrés Segovia, who was visiting Venezuela at the time. Segovia was impressed enough with the pair, because he invited them to his master classes that were to start the following year in Siena, Italy.

=== Studies in Europe ===
Despite their obvious qualities as promising guitarists, it took some time for Díaz and Riera to establish themselves in Europe. Riera started his studies in the Real Conservatorio de Música y Declamación in Madrid in 1952. He obtained a "First Class Diploma" in 1953. In this year, he started his career as a classical guitar performer.

During the Summer of 1954, he was able to attend Segovia's master classes at the Accademia Musicale Chigiana in Siena. Segovia led him to perfect his already highly developed technique. It was generally accepted that both he and Díaz were above average in terms of technique and repertoire. Furthermore, they renewed the rather stale (at the time) guitar repertoire, by bringing to Europe the works of important Latin-American composers, which were largely unknown at the time.

=== Graduation and concert tours ===
In 1954, Riera married Julia Esteban Esteban in Spain and established Madrid as his main place of residence. They had four children together, all of whom were to become musicians: María Josefina, Rubén, Andrés Raúl and Juan José.

The second half of the 1950s was spent touring Europe and Venezuela, playing the repertoire that Segovia had established, as well as the works of Latin-American composers such as the aforementioned Lauro, Heitor Villa-Lobos, Agustín Barrios Mangoré, Manuel Ponce, Vicente Emilio Sojo and his old master, Raúl Borges. During those touring years, he started introducing his own pieces in his repertoire. Riera also performed many guitar duo concerts with his friend Alirio Díaz. In 1956, the two recorded an LP of popular Latin American pieces under a pseudonym to avoid incurring the wrath of Segovia, who frowned at the popular repertoire for the guitar (the album was released as El Uno y El Otro i.e. "One and the Other").

=== New York: the consolidation of a triple career ===
In 1962, Venezuelan writer and composer Conny Méndez invited Riera to stage a concert in New York, where she was residing. The recital was very successful in a city which, although traditionally is rich in culture, was thirsty for good classical guitar. Riera ended up staying for years, consolidating his triple career as composer, concert guitarist and teacher.

During those years, Riera composed many important works, the best known today being the Preludio Criollo, which is a required piece in the guitar syllabi in Europe and the Americas. He also composed the prelude Elorac which features a very daring harmonic structure and style that predates the works of modern guitar composers such as Leo Brouwer, Roland Dyens and Carlo Domeniconi.

Riera also performed many times on different stages and concert halls in the U.S. East Coast both as a solo guitarist and as featured soloist with an orchestra.

Riera was a popular member of New York's Society of the Classic Guitar. He frequented Mirko's Restaurant, a salon frequented by luminaries of the New York guitar scene, namely Vladimir Bobri, Gregory d'Alessio, and Segovia's inner circle. Known as the leading improviser on the classic guitar he created spontaneous accompaniments to many standard etudes. Riera collaborated with the Robert Joffrey Ballet Company arranging a work for guitar and orchestra, Antonio Vivaldi's Concerto in D-Major for Violin, Strings, a Cembalo, Pincherle 151 which he performed many times. The work, Viva Vivaldi, remains a mainstay in the Joffrey repertoire.

=== The return to Venezuela: Self-realization as educator ===
In 1969 he decided to move back to Venezuela with his family. He established himself in Barquisimeto, in 1971, where he created a music studies program for the Universidad Centro Occidental Lisandro Alvarado. Additionally, in the summer months, he opened a teaching practice similar to what he had experienced in Siena. In 1971, he ran the first Curso Internacional de Guitarra between July 1 and August 30. Many Venezuelan and foreign-born guitarists attended. The last one took place in 1991.

=== Last years ===
He spent his last years composing and teaching further. His presence was often a cherished sight at guitar festivals in Caracas and other cities, where he held informal meetings and fraternal conversations with other guitarists of fame, like Alirio Díaz, Leo Brouwer, David Russell, Carlos Barbosa-Lima, and of course his many pupils, several of which are now celebrities. A composer's competition was established bearing his name. Rodrigo Riera died in Barquisimeto on August 9, 1999.

== Guitar works ==
The work of Rodrigo Riera concentrates on Latin American forms. He once said that he "would feel silly [...writing...] fugues and minuets, when we don't have that kind of music [in Latin America]." Therefore, his compositions are a reflection of the music that was popular in the early 20th century. He wrote valses, danzas, joropos, golpes, gaitas, merengues and even a few choros.

=== Most popular pieces ===
Rodrigo Riera's compositions are not easy to catalog or categorize, as there is a copious assortment of notable compositions from his years in Spain, like Choro (1960). Merengue Venezolano (1962), Serenata Ingenua (1963), and Canción Caroreña (1964); from his years in New York, as Preludio Criollo (1963), Elorac, (1964), A Venezuelan triptych - Melancolía, Monotonía, Nostalgia (1968), Golpe al Diablo de Carora (1969); and those compositions he created in Venezuela, the most popular of which are: Chorinho, Homenaje a la Chicachagua, Pajarillo con Revoltillo (1980s), and Suite Popular - Homage to Maestro Antonio Lauro (1990).

=== Complete list of works ===
Disclaimer: Though fairly accurate, this list may prove to be confusing (especially to the non-fluent in Spanish language) due to several reasons: first, Rodrigo Riera was not so prolific at inventing names for his compositions as he was at creating music, so there are many repeated names corresponding to distinct compositions; second, the names that he chose consist mostly of the genre of the piece, which adds to the confusion: i.e., Estudio (étude), Preludio (prélude), and Valse (waltz) were his favorite words for naming his creations. Obviously, there is a strong need for a numbered catalogue if Riera's works are ever to be orderly published. Dedications (ded.), dates and places of the compositions have been included whenever available.

WORKS FOR THE GUITAR

- Aire venezolano, 17.Mar.1963;
- Perfil gitano, New York, 1964;
- Estudio to put a kitten to sleep, 25.May.1972;
- Sugerente, waltz, Barquisimeto, 12.Mar.1976, ded. to his son Andrés Raúl;
- Preludio (Estudio), Caracas, 14.Jun.1976, ded. to his friend Francisco Andrés, inspired on J.S.Bach;
- Paseo, 25.Nov.1978;
- Joropito, 25.Dec.1978;
- Aguinaldo, Barquisimeto, 4.Dec.1978;
- Melodía para dos guitarras, Barquisimeto, 6.Dec.1978 (there is a transcription for guitar and bassoon);
- Preludio estudio, 1978;
- Valse Estudio, Barquisimeto, 3.Mar.1979;
- Valse (Suite to sing to the Peoples);
- Valse Estudio, Barquisimeto, 5.Jun.1979;
- Seis por derecho, 20.Jun.1979,
- Estudio preludio, Barquisimeto, 18.Nov.1979;
- Preludio, Barquisimeto, 28.Nov.1979;
- Estudio, 25.Jun.197?; Preludio, 27.Jan.1980;
- Melodía (in waltz form), Barquisimeto, 5.Apr.1980;
- El Poeta, Barquisimeto, 5.Apr.1980;
- Valse al negro Tino, Barquisimeto, 16.May.1980;
- Preludio Ingenuo, 9.Jul.1980;
- Canción y Danza, Barquisimeto, 18. VII.1980, ded. to his cousin Ignacio Ramos Silva, guitarist;
- Preludio, Barquisimeto, 22.Jul.1980;
- Preludio estudio. 28.Sep.1980;
- Julita, Barquisimeto, 1980, waltz;
- El simplón, Barquisimeto, 9.Jun. 1981, tres Guitarras, waltz etude;
- Pajarillo con revoltillo, Barquisimeto,1 981, ded. to his son Rubén;
- Valse en forma de preludio, 10.Mar.1982;
- Pequeño Valse, 1.Apr.1982;
- Valse lento, 10.Jun.1982;
- Estudio in danza zuliana form, Barquisimeto, 15.Nov.1982;
- Danza popular venezolana, Barquisimeto, 23.Dec.1982;
- Estudio, Barquisimeto, 9.Feb.1983;
- Estudio, 21.Mar. 1983;
- Estudio, 24.Mar.1983;
- Estudio-danza, Barquisimeto, 6. IV. 1983;
- Preludio a Luis, 16.May.1983;
- Valse, Barquisimeto, 15.Jul. 1983, waltz etude;
- Estudio, Barquisimeto, 25.Oct.1983;
- Merengue venezolano, Barquisimeto, 27.Oct. 1983, etude;
- Merengue venezolano, ?.Mar.1984;
- Preludio, 20. XI.1984, Preludio in etude form;
- Pequeña danza, Barquisimeto, 17.Apr.1985, etude;
- Merengue, 23.Apr.1985, etude;
- Danza, 24.Apr.1985, etude;
- Canción, 25.Apr.1985, etude;
- Preludio, Barquisimeto, 24.Apr.1985;
- Danza, 6.May.1985;
- Danza infantil, 6.May.1985;
- El Carne, 21.May.1985, merengue-etude;
- Valse Estudio, Barquisimeto, 21.May.1985;
- Preludio, Barquisimeto, 22. V. 1985;
- Danza en forma de estudio, Barquisimeto, 3.Jun. 1985;
- Danza, Barquisimeto, 18.Jun.1985;
- Preludio, 21.Nov. 1985, etude;
- Lección en forma de chôro, Barquisimeto, 5.Mar.1986, ded. to Felipe Sangiorgi (Musicologist);
- Preludio criollo, Editado por ´´Edition Sikorsk´´i NR, Germany, c.1963, recorded by the composer;
- Danza a Maracaibo, recorded by the composer;
- Serenata ingenua, recorded by the composer;
- Merengue Venezolano, recorded by the composer;
- Canción Caroreña, recorded by the composer;
- Choro (Publ. by Unión Musical Española), Madrid, 1964, recorded by the composer;
- Nana, (Publ. by Unión Musical Española), Madrid, 1964;
- Melancolía (Published in the Cuatro Piezas Venezolanas collection, Halstan y Co. Lid, England, c. 1984);
- Monotonía Nostalgia, ídem.;
- Valse, ded. to Nando Riera, recorded by the composer;
- Elorac, ded. to Carole Warner, (Published by Unión Musical Española), Madrid, 1964, recorded by the composer;
- Estudio; a simple melody in country waltz form;
- Joropo; Etude;
- El Encandilador de Zamuros, based on a store by the same name;
- Danza a Manolay;
- Preludio a la Cruz;
- Melody for an Etude by Sor, ded. Etta Zaccaria and Gustavo Lopez;
- Oración al Jueves Santo, Preludio;
- Alegre Golpe; Canción I; Canción II; Valse ded. to don Manuel Guerrero;
- Estudio Lento; El juguetón, etudes in waltz form; Canción, recorded by the composer;
- Joropo, improvisation while being recorded by the composer;
- Merengue, etude;
- Valse, etude;
- Preludio; Manotolo; Estudio in merengue form;
- Valse Estudio; etude in joropo form;
- Aire venezolano;
- Valse etude;
- Danza venezolana;
- Preludio en terceras;
- Andante;
- Danza infantil, merengue infantil;
- Canción, etude;
- Danza Estudio, Andante, etudes;
- Valse, waltz ded. to Agapito Pérez Cordero, guitarist;
- Estudio; Estudio de simples accordes; Vals campestre, ded. to his son Andrés Raúl;
- Homenaje a La Chica Chagua;
- Canción a mi hija María Josefina, ded. to daughter María Josefina;
- Danza al Zulia, zulian dance;
- Aire zuliano, ded. to his student Darío González;
- Valse a mi Nacha Mosquera, waltz ded. to Nacha Mosquera;
- Canción blanda y Valse estudio, ded. to his son Rubén;
- Homenaje a Teresa Rojas; Golpe al diablo de Carora; Ysabel, Mercedes, waltzes;
- Pequeña suite para guitarra a la manera de mi pueblo, Canción, Danza, Pequeño Valse, song, dance, little waltz;
- El popular, waltz, ded. to his friend the artist Jesús Soto;
- Canción, ded. to Raúl Borges;
- Preludio; Dance; Study; Autograph; Venezuelan profile for two guitars.

TRANSCRIPTIONS & ARRANGEMENTS:

- Fernando Sor, Two small works for guitar, for three guitars;
- Antonio Lauro, Natalia, waltz, Barquisimeto, 13.May.1981, arr. for two guitars;
- Flavio Herrera, Polka;
- (anonymous) Tonada.

== Bibliography ==
- Bruzual, Alejandro - Rodrigo Riera - La Parábola de la Tierra Ediciones Farmatodo, 1999

Other sources:

- Interviews
- Enciclopedia de la Música en Venezuela, ed. Fundación Bigott (ISBN 980-6428-02-1), Caracas, Venezuela, 1998)
- Personal files of Rodrigo Riera.
