= Boris Gaquere =

Belgian musician (born 1977)

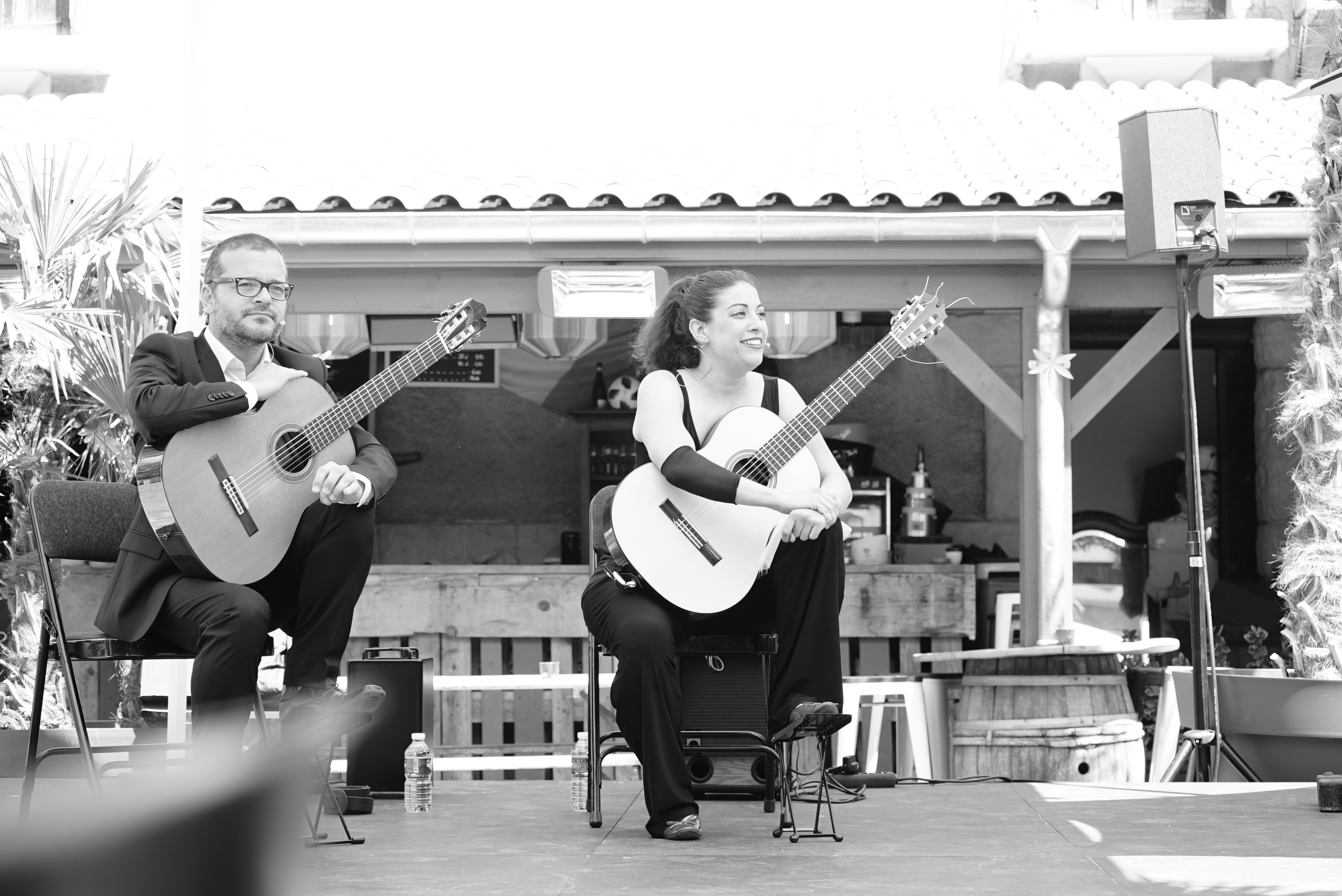
In concert with Gaëlle Solal

Boris Gaquere is a classical guitarist.

Gaquere was born in Brussels in 1977. He has also performed in guitar-duo formation with Denis Sung-Hô and now often collaborates with the Brazilian percussionist Renato Martins.

== Recordings ==
- Obrigado (Gaquere / Sung-Hô) (Chamber, CH207)
- Xeque-Mate (VGo Recordings VG1004)
- Carpe Diem (VGo Recordings VG1010)
- Tempo Feliz (Gaquere / Martins), f010
