= Jorge Cardoso =

Jorge Cardoso [full name: Jorge Ruben Cardoso Krieger] (born 26 January 1949) is a classical guitarist, composer, researcher, medical doctor (National University of Cordoba, Argentina) and teacher (Madrid Royal Conservatory). He has performed in Europe, America, Asia and Africa, and has frequently participated in international festivals, conferences, seminars, radio and television.

== Life ==
Cardoso was born in Posadas, Misiones, Argentina, and studied the guitar with Lucas Braulio Areco and Luis J. Cassinelli. Having gained a scholarship from the National Fund for the Arts in Argentina, he was able to study with Maria Hermini A. de Gomez Crespo. From the age of 14, Cardoso has won first prizes in several Argentine competitions, including at the Festival of Music of the Littoral at Posadas (1963), the National Folklore Composition Competition (1967), and the International Concourse of the Classical Guitar at Morón (1973).

He now lives in Madrid, Spain, where he was the founder of the Madrid Guitar Chamber Orchestra and is President of the International Organization for Latin American Music Diffusion (GUIA). He was the Art Director of the Posadas International Guitar Festival (Argentina), the Alsace International Guitar Festival and the Morocco International Guitar Festival organized by the Instituto Cervantes in 1999. He is currently managing the International Festival Lucas B. Areco in Posadas, the Lambesc International Guitar Festival and the World's Guitar in the French Haut Verdon region. He frequently gives concerts across Europe, South America and Japan.

== Works ==
Cardoso has composed over 400 works: solo guitar, duets (two guitars, guitar and violin, claves, viola, cello and flute), three and four guitars, string quartet, guitar and stringed, guitar and wind, concerts for guitar and orchestra, for guitar orchestra and symphony orchestra, string orchestra, and voice. These have been recorded by over 200 artists. By far his most popular piece is Milonga, from 24 Piezas Sudamericanas.

He also transcribed and made folkloric arrangements of music from several South American countries, from the Spanish Renaissance and Baroque periods, and from other nations and periods.

== Writings ==
Cardoso is the author of several books and music editions including:

- Ciencia y método de la técnica guitarrística (1974), with editions in Japanese (1981), French (1983), Polish (1995), a Spanish version published in Costa Rica (1988), and a bilingual Spanish/English version (2006)
- Rhythms and Musical Forms of Argentina, Paraguay and Uruguay (Posadas, Argentina: Editorial Universitaria de la UNAM, 2006)
- Compass and Torches to Play Early Music (Interpretation Notes to the Renaissance and Baroque) (in Spanish) (Madrid: Acordes Concert, 2008)
- Lucas Braulio Areco. Complete Works for Guitar (Posadas, Argentina: Ed. Universitaria de la UNAM, 2010)
- Happy Musician Withered. How to be Unfortunate and Sick in a Happy and Healthy World (about diseases of musicians) (Madrid: Acordes Concert, 2013).

== Recordings ==
On David Russell's 2004 Grammy Award-winning album, Aire Latino, two of Cardoso's pieces feature: Milonga, and Vals Peruano which is from Suite Sudamericana.

- Misa Criolla and Songs of Latin America, with Toldería Group (Movieplay C 3413, 1975)
- Don't Call me Foreigner, with Rafael Amor (Movieplay 17.0894/5, 1976)
- Song to Chile, with Iquique Group (Nevada NDE 0004, 1977)
- The American Peoples, with Toldería Group (Movieplay 17.0895/7, 1976)
- Canto General, Neruda & Teodorakis, with Toldería Group (Movieplay 17.1242/3, 1977)
- South American Classic Folk Music (D.P.M. P.M. 2040, 1977). Released in Germany as El Condor Pasa.
- Personages, with Rafael Amor (Movieplay 17.1286/3, 1978)
- South American Suite (Dial Records N.D. 5019, 1978)
- Jorge Cardoso (Dial Records, Diapasón 5038, 1979)
- Jorge Cardoso - Lamento Caingua (Dial Records, Diapasón 5054, 1980)
- Jorge Cardoso & Niibori Guitar Orchestra (Apassionato Records APAC 8009, 1980)
- Littoral Suite (Records Discos 5067, 1981)
- Moments and Waves, with Indio Juan (Dial Discos 549164, 1983)
- The Great Guitarists of our Time (RCA RL 43454, 1983)
- Guitar Chamber Orchestra of Madrid, cond. by Jorge Cardoso (SAGA SED 5008, 1984)
- Jorge Cardoso (Zweitausendeins Blue Angel BA 29005, 1985)
- Confidences (JC 585, 1985)
- Twangs (Tecnosaga MSD 4004, 1988)
- Cardoso Plays Cardoso (Stereo 9311 2123 Opus, 1988)
- On the Distaff Time, with Indio Juan (DEPS SPD 10018, 1989)
- Talking Hands (Aliso Records 1021, 1990)
- Twangs vol. II (Tecnosaga MSD 4009, 1990)
- Twangs (Spanish Baroque Music) (Several Records SCD 801/2, 1992)
- Jorge Cardoso (Festiwal Muzyki Gitarowej) (Zaiks BIEM S 496, 1992)
- International Guitar Festival of Alsace (Loco et. Lev 9110 and 9111, 1993)
- Francisco Ortiz & Jorge Cardoso (PL-MC 003, 1994)
- Misionerita, Jorge Cardoso (PL-CD 0041, 1994)
- Guitars of the World Festival '95 (EPSA 17058, 1996)
- Raphaëlla Smits - Jorge Cardoso (Accent 2 96121 D, 1996)
- Guitars of the World Festival '96 (EPSA, 1997)
- Horizons, with Liliana Rodríguez, voice (PL-CD 014, 1997)
- Dominika Bialostocka. Suite of the Mita'i (Professional Music Press PMPCD 405-505, 1998)
- Friends, with Francisco Ortiz (PL-CD 023, 1998)
- Origins (PL-CD 007)
- South Wind, with Liliana Rodríguez, voice (PL-CD 013, 1998)
- Homage, with Liliana Rodríguez, voice (PL-CD 035, 2000)
- Concert of Wine. Indiana Suite, with Juan Falú (Altaïs Music AM 0402, 2005)
- Jorge Cardoso, Duos, with Eric Sobczyk (Altaïs Music AM 0502, 2005)
- Liliana Rodriguez. Waltzes, Tangos and Milongas (Dial Discos, 2005)
- Queen of the Night, with Liliana Rodríguez, voice, and Raphaëlla Smits (Accent ACC 24178, 2007)
- Guarani Concert. Horizons and Dreams, with Liliana Rodríguez, voice (2003)
- Hands on Freedom, with Juan Falú (Altaïs Music AM 0701)
- The Guitar of Jorge Cardoso (didactic DVD, Spain, 1998)
- Music of Lointains Country, with Sylvie Dagnac (2014).
