= Étude No. 12 (Villa-Lobos) =

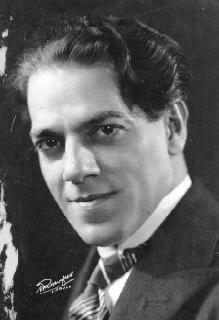
Heitor Villa-Lobos, c. 1922

Heitor Villa-Lobos's Étude No. 12, the last of his Twelve Études for Guitar, was first published by Max Eschig, Paris, in 1953. The piece is in A minor and is marked Animé. The autograph manuscript of Etude No. 12 is dated 1929, Paris.

== Analysis ==
Étude No. 12 is a study in glissandos, boldly turning to musical use the normally unpleasant sounds produced when the player's finger slides over the guitar's strings. Like the preceding two studies (and unlike the earlier ones), it is in ternary (ABA) form, with a strongly contrasting middle section (marked più mosso) featuring drumming sounds produced on the fifth and sixth strings together.
