= C. A. Pinto Fonseca =

- Born: Carlos Alberto Pinto Fonseca; 1933; Belo Horizonte, Minas Gerais, Brazil
- Died: 2006 (aged 72–73)
- Occupations: Composer, conductor

Carlos Alberto Pinto Fonseca (1933–2006) was a Brazilian musician. He was born in Belo Horizonte, in the state of Minas Gerais.

== Career ==
Pinto Fonseca had a very successful career as a conductor. He won several conducting competitions, not only in Brazil, but also in Argentina and Italy. Under his direction, the Madrigal Ars Nova toured in South America and Europe and achieved international recognition as one of the best Brazilian choral groups. Pinto Fonseca is well known for his arrangements of folk music. The Missa Afro-Brasileiria (1976) won the "Best Vocal Work" prize of the Associação dos Críticos de São Paulo, and later became his most popular choral work in the United States.

== Muié Rendêra ==
Two of the most popular folk tunes from Northeast Brazil are combined in this Pinto Fonseca arrangement: Olê, Muié Rendêra and É Lampa, é Lampa, é Lampeão. Although Pinto Fonseca emphasizes the rhythmic aspect of the piece, his choral writing is very clear, which allows the listener to identify the melodies very easily. The simple harmonic vocabulary reinforces the simplicity of the style. In performance, the addition of percussion will strengthen the character of the baião, a Brazilian folk dance. María Guinand is the editor of the piece.

=== Text ===
Brazilian text

Olê, muié rendêra
olê, muié renda
tu me ensina a fazê rendá
que eu te ensino a namorá.

Virgulino é Lampeão.
É Lampa, é Lampa, é Lampa,
é Lampeão.
O seu nome é Virgulino,
o apelido é Lampeão.

English translation

Hey, lacemaker woman,
hey, lacemaker woman,
if you teach me how to weave,
I'll teach you how to court (love).

Virgulino is Lampeão
He is Lampa, Lampa, Lampa,
he is Lampeão.
His name is Virgulino,
his nickname is Lampeão.
