= Vilho Luolajan-Mikkola =

Finnish composer (1911–2005)

Vilho Luolajan-Mikkola (22 December 1911 – 14 November 2005) was a Finnish composer of contemporary classical music.

Luolajan-Mikkola studied composition under Aarre Merikanto and Selim Palmgren. One of his most famous works is the song cycle Koiruoho, RUUSUNKUKKA, which was completed in 1977.

Luolajan-Mikkola's other musical output includes woodwind music among others. He was an active composer until his last years, and the song "Hiljentyen" dates from 2001. Luolajan-Mikkola died in 2005, at the age of 93 in Helsinki.
