= Ada Brumaru =

Romanian musicologist and music critic

- Born: July 5, 1930; Bucharest, Kingdom of Romania
- Died: July 7, 2008; Bucharest, Romania
- Occupation: Music editor

Ada Brumaru (July 5, 1930 – July 7, 2008) was a Romanian musicologist and music critic.

== Life ==
Brumaru was born in Bucharest on 5 July 1930. She joined and studied music at the Music Conservatory in Bucharest in 1949. Her teachers included Ion Nonna Otescu, Tudor Ciortea (musical forms), Constantin Bugeanu, Adriana Sachelarie, Andrei Tudor (music history) and Nelly Antonescu (piano). She was there until 1955.

In 1950 Brumaru joined the Romanian Broadcasting Society becoming editor in chief in 1954 and director in 1972. A post she held until 1986. From 1982 she and Michel Godard made shows about Romanian music at the Radio-France Musique in Paris. Romanians were held in some esteem in Paris, Brumanu recalls that she was once denied access asareporter to a music venue. She was asked to name two leading Romanian conductors - which she did.

Brumaru was asked to join national and international juries of musical competitions ("Prix musical de Radio" - Brno-Brno, 1969, the "Italy" Prize - Florence, 1970).

Brumanu's interests led to her 1962 book Romanticism in music and to the creation of the Enescu film. Shewasa member of the Union of Composers and Musicologists in Romania and she received three of their awards. She was a strong supporter of Radio România Muzical which is the public funded classical and jazz radio station.

Brumaru died in Bucharest in 2008.
