= Pavel Steidl =

Czech guitarist

Pavel Steidl (born June 24, 1961) is a classical guitarist who was born in Rakovnik, Czechoslovakia (now in the Czech Republic), but has lived in the Netherlands for many years.

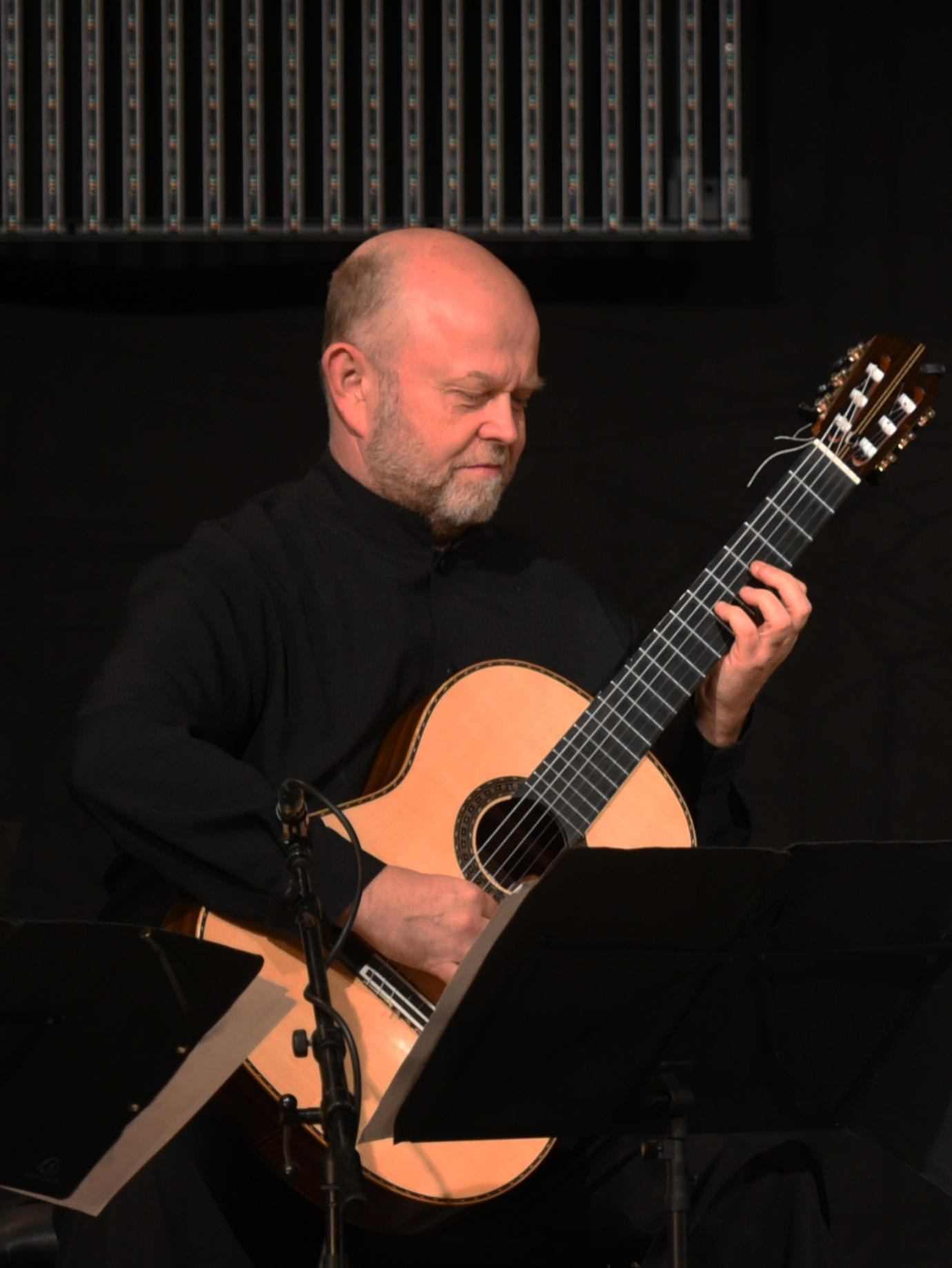
Pavel Steidl playling at Hamburger Gitarrenfestival 2018

== Biography ==
After winning first prize at the 1982 International Guitar Competition of Radio France in Paris, Steidl began his career as a professional musician.

"Here was a guitarist who knew how to laugh with the music and share the joke with his audience. But behind the entertainer lies a serious artist, whose extended composition in memory of Jana Obrovska proved fully capable of stirring emotions at the other end of the scale. Never was a standing ovation more richly deserved. Pavel Steidl had won the hearts and minds of a capacity crowd." (Classical guitar magazine)

As he won the Radio France International Competition in Paris in 1982, he has been recognized as one of the most celebrated soloists of his generation. Among the members of the jury were such artists as Alexandre Tansman, Antonio Lauro and Maria Luisa Anido.

Before that he studied with such guitarist as Milan Zelenka and Štěpán Rak in Prague. In 1987 he decided to emigrate to the Netherlands where after years of studying and getting inspiration from many different artists he has created his own style which is not ignoring authentic way of interpretation 19th-century guitar literature on periodic instruments and going far to some world music elements. Pavel Steidl also composes himself and his own compositions are often played on his concerts. He played in more than 40 countries of the world from among Canada, USA, China, India, Japan, Europe, South and Central America and many others. On demand of Italian Guitar Magazine Guitart the readers decided to choose him as a guitar player of the year 2004 . Pavel Steidl plays many instruments, but mainly Francisco Simplicio (1926) and Franz Butcher (2008), romantic guitar: copies of J.G.Stauffer guitar made by B.Kresse and original instrument from the beginning of the 19th century Nikolaus G.Ries cca. 1830

In his teaching, Pavel's approach is encouraging but subtle. For, as he says, "the teacher is not allowed to say everything. [...] I let them play one piece. Each note twice, one staccato, one tenuto, to show what you can do. The possibilities: that's what I like very much. I don't like to write piano, forte, tenuto. I don't like metronomes."

Steidl is known for using overtone singing in some works, such as Domeniconi's Hommage à Jimi Hendrix, op. 52.

== Facial Gestures ==
Pavel Steidl often uses unique gestures during his performances (both facial gestures, and motions with hands and body).

=== Perception ===
Some people feel that Steidl's gestures give an additional dimension to his playing, e.g. showing his expressive involvement in the music, being a personal way of helping his phrasing become lyrical (with voice-gestures - using the guitar, but "expressing like a singer"), serving to underline certain melodies and their character, or hinting at crescendo in held chords (even though the strings' vibrations are getting softer), expressing fun/joy, entertaining, etc.

His face while performing is generally very expressive and during one of the sonatas [Scherzo] he played on this fact and animated himself to such a degree that a very respectful audience couldn't help but to laugh out loud. This had the effect of bringing the audience and performer together, in on the same joke if you like. This also served to further endear this extraordinary showman to an already impressed audience.

— Review

== Recordings ==
- Luigi Legnani - 36 caprices op. 20, Fantasia op. 19 - Naxos 1998 / Cat.8.554198
- Napoleon Coste - Guitar Music Vol.3 - Naxos 2000 / Cat.8.554353
- N. Paganini - Sonate&Ghiribizzi for guitar - Frame 2001 Italy
- J. K. Mertz - Bardeklange - Frame 2003

Discography: Hudebni Mladi - Supraphone (1983) Tyden Nove Tvorby - Panton (1984) Pavel Steidl Debut - Panton (1985) Guitar / Music of the 18 th and 19 th centuries - Panton (1993) Masters of the Czech Classical Guitar - Pehy (1994) Kdyz mam nohy o mesic opreny - Panton (1994) Cantabile - Erasmus (1995) (with Jan Opsitos - violin) L. Legnani - 36 caprices op. 20, Fantasia op. 19 - Naxos (1998) N.COSTE - Guitar Music Vol.3 - Naxos (2000) N. Paganini - Sonate&Ghiribizzi for guitar – (Frame 2001) Italy J. K. Mertz - Bardeklange, (Frame 2003) Four Agreements – fast book (spoken word - Jaroslav Dušek), (Tympanum 2009)

== Photos ==
- Masterclass Photos (from Ligita 2005)
- Concert Photos (at Ligita 2005)
- Festival Internacional De La Ciudad De Chihuahua
- Masquerade hall of chateau Český Krumlov International Music Festival Český Krumlov (23.8.2006): 1, 2, 3, 4
- Photos (hollabolla Kulturmanagement)

== Interviews ==
- Interview by Jarka Halkova, Český rozhlas (November 2005) (Audio Interview)
