= Eyþór Þorláksson =

Icelandic guitarist and composer (1930–2018)

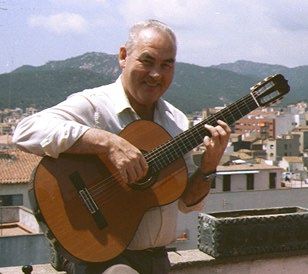

Background information
- Born: Eyþór Þorláksson; 22 March 1930; Hafnarfjörður, Iceland
- Died: 14 December 2018 (aged 88) Reykjavík, Iceland
- Genres: Classical and Jazz
- Occupations: Musician, teacher, arranger and composer
- Instrument: Guitar
- Years active: 1948–1992
- Website: classical-guitar-school.com

Eyþór Þorláksson (22 March 1930 – 14 December 2018) was an Icelandic guitarist and composer.

== Life and work ==
Eyþór was born at Krosseyrarvegur in Hafnarfjörður. His parents where María Jakobsdóttir, from Aðalvík and Þorlákur Guðlaugsson from Biskupstungur.

In the years 1950–1952 he studied guitar in England, Denmark and Sweden and in 1953 in Madrid with Daniel Fortea and Quintin Esquembre. In the years 1954–1957 he studied harmony and counterpoint with Victor Urbancic and in 1958–1961 he completed his guitar studies with Graciano Tarragó in Barcelona. Since then he has been the principal guitar teacher at the music school in Hafnarfjordur and has arranged and written a lot of tutorial material for the classical guitar. In his retirement he continued to arrange and compose for the guitar.

Eyþór was singer Elly Vilhjálms' first husband.

== Musical works ==
Guitar Methods
[1037] The first guitar lessons. Method for beginners with accompaniment. (Icelandic text). ISBN 978-9935-446-00-8
[1038] Guitar Method I. 1. grade. ISBN 978-9935-446-01-5
[1032] Guitar Method II. 2. grade. ISBN 978-9935-446-02-2

Collections
[1004] Guitar Tunes. Folk songs from all over, easy arrangements for the beginner. 76 tunes. (Icelandic text). ISBN 978-9935-446-03-9
[1005] Guitar Moment I. Collection and arrangements Eythor Thorlaksson. ISBN 978-9935-446-08-4
[1033] Guitar Moment II. Collection and arrangements Eythor Thorlaksson. ISBN 978-9935-446-09-1
[1034] Guitar Moment III. Collection and arrangements Eythor Thorlaksson. ISBN 978-9935-446-10-7
[1086] Guitar Moment IV. Collection and arrangements Eythor Thorlaksson. ISBN 978-9935-446-11-4

Studies
[1025] Scales and arpeggios. Collected and fingered by Eythor Thorlaksson. 1st – 8th grade. ISBN 978-9935-446-04-6
[1110] Sight reading samples. 1st – 8th grade. ISBN 978-9935-446-05-3
[1153] Studies 1 – 4. ISBN 978-9935-446-06-0
[1154] Studies 5 – 8. ISBN 978-9935-446-07-7

Compositions for Solo Guitar
[1157] Ragtime Chôro. ISBN 978-9935-446-12-1
[1165] Partita en E minor, Allemande, Courante, Sarabanda, Gavota, Giga. ISBN 978-9935-446-13-8
[1160] Valsecito. ISBN 978-9935-446-14-5
[1159] Estudio de contrapunto. ISBN 978-9935-446-15-2
[1162] Montparnasse. ISBN 978-9935-446-16-9
[1016] Las Buganvillas. ISBN 978-9935-446-17-6
[1029] Cachucha. ISBN 978-9935-446-18-3
[1156] Saludo. ISBN 978-9935-446-19-0
[1030] 6 Pop sketches. ISBN 978-9935-446-20-6
[1031] Rhimes. ISBN 978-9935-446-21-3
[1045] Improvisation no. 1, 2 and 3. ISBN 978-9935-446-22-0
[1047] Preludes no. 1, 2 and 3. ISBN 978-9935-446-23-7
[1049] Tonada de contrapunto. ISBN 978-9935-446-24-4
[1057] 8 guitar pieces. ISBN 978-9935-446-25-1
[1074] Chôro Andaluz. ISBN 978-9935-446-26-8
[1043] Chôro de Velez. ISBN 978-9935-446-27-5
[1044] Chôro de Feria. ISBN 978-9935-446-28-2
[1046] Sonatina Breve. ISBN 978-9935-446-29-9
[1021] Three little pieces. ISBN 978-9935-446-30-5
[1129] Suite Tropical. Onda Tropical – Aguas Claras – Vals Caribe. ISBN 978-9935-446-31-2
[1139] Sonatina Antigua. ISBN 978-9935-446-32-9
[1140] Sonatina Folklorica. ISBN 978-9935-446-33-6
[1143] Prelude no. 4. ISBN 978-9935-446-34-3
[1144] Waltz no. 6. ISBN 978-9935-446-35-0
[1151] Oración. ISBN 978-9935-446-36-7
[1174] Vals sureño. ISBN 978-9935-446-37-4
[1175] Danza Paraguaya . ISBN 978-9935-446-38-1
[1200] Arco Iris en Primavera. ISBN 978-9935-446-39-8
[1201] El tiempo pasa. ISBN 978-9935-446-40-4
[1202] Media Luna. ISBN 978-9935-446-41-1
[1208] El Payaso. ISBN 978-9935-446-42-8

Guitar Duets
[2001] Guitar duets – Volume I. 16 songs from different countries. ISBN 978-9935-446-43-5
[2004] Guitar duets – Volume II. 16 songs from different countries. ISBN 978-9935-446-44-2
[2007] Kanon fantasy. Guitar duet. (score and parts). ISBN 978-9935-446-45-9
[2027] Divertimento. Guitar duet. ISBN 978-9935-446-46-6
[2028] Brisa Marina. Guitar duet. ISBN 978-9935-446-47-3
[2039] Tema popular de Brasil. ISBN 978-9935-446-48-0

Guitar Trios
[3001] 12 Guitar trios for beginners. Arrangements by Eythor Thorlaksson. ISBN 978-9935-446-49-7
[3016] Allegretto. ISBN 978-9935-446-50-3
[3014] Andante al estilo antiguo. ISBN 978-9935-446-51-0
[3020] 3 trios. ISBN 978-9935-446-52-7

Guitar Quartets
[4016] Camino de Felanitx – Guitar Quartet. ISBN 978-9935-446-53-4
[4021] Cartama. ISBN 978-9935-446-54-1
[4023] Danza Andaluza. Arrangement by Eythor Thorlaksson (score and parts). ISBN 978-9935-446-55-8

== Guitar students ==
- Pétur Jónasson
- Páll Eyjólfsson
- Hrafnhildur Hagalín Guðmundsdóttir
- Sveinn Eyþórsson
- Trausti Thorberg
