= Jean-Marie Raymond =

French guitarist, composer, teacher, and conductor

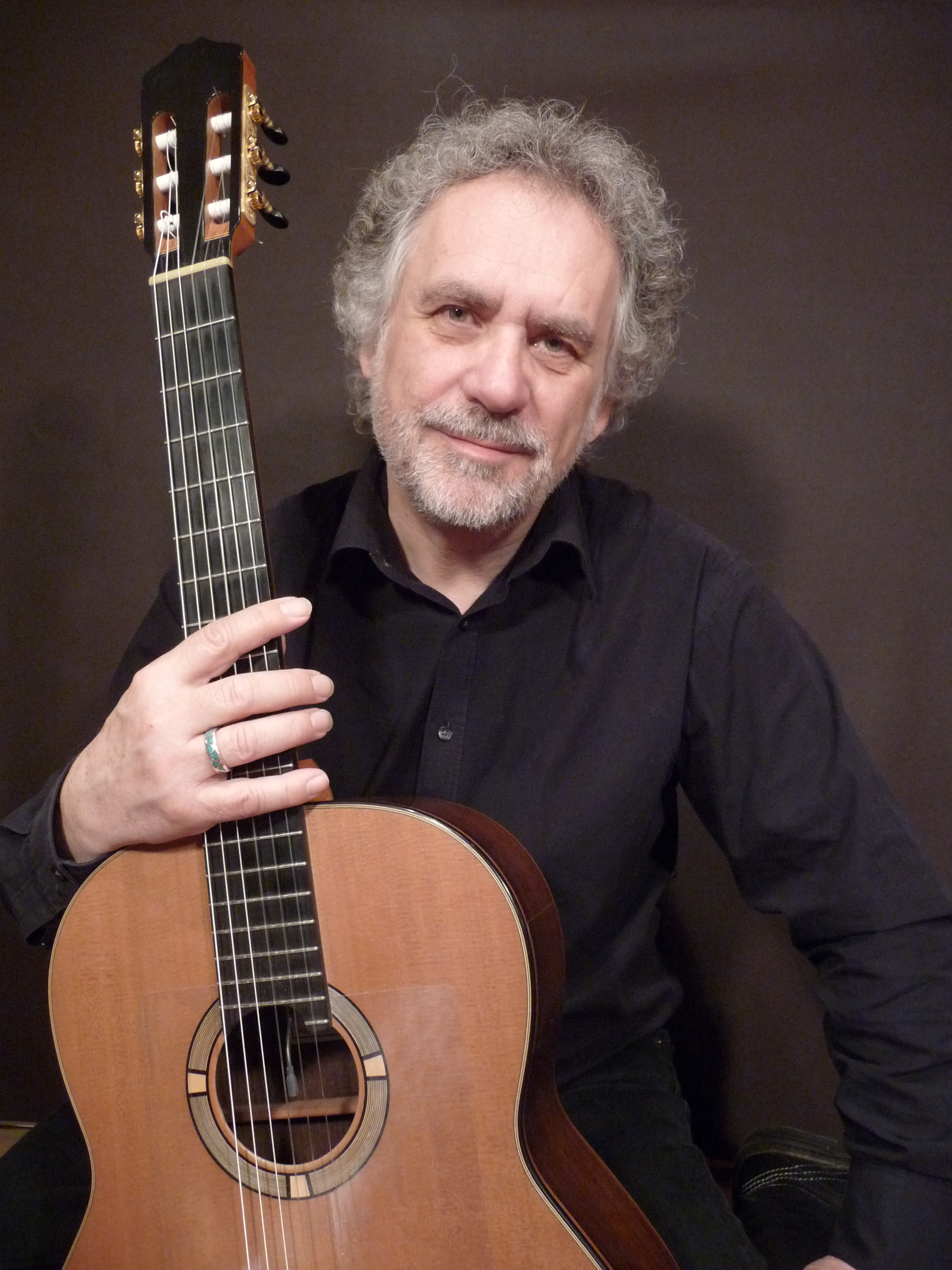
Jean-Marie Raymond

Jean-Marie Raymond (born 1949) is a French classical guitarist, composer, conductor and teacher.

== Life ==
Guitarist, composer, teacher and conductor, Raymond studied music at the École normale de musique de Paris with Alberto Ponce and Javier Hinojosa. He was also a student of the world-renowned master Emilio Pujol. He studied musical composition with Yvonne Desportes and conducting with Désiré Dondeyne, both Grand prix de Rome. First Prize in classical guitar, he also obtained the State Diploma and the Certificate of Aptitude.

In 1977, he played as a soloist under the direction of Seiji Ozawa with the Orchestre de Paris. He produced a recording ("Four-handed Guitar" now "Kizuna" in its expanded reissue) with his long-time friend, the Japanese guitarist Minoru Inagaki. He performs internationally as a soloist and with the Trio Sortilèges (flûte, guitar, cello). In 1999, with Thierry Frebourg, CEO of Studio Press (Roularta Media Group), he founded the Guitare Classique magazine which occupies a major place in the landscape of the specialized press for the guitar.

A large portion of his compositions is published by Productions d'Oz, Quebec.

== Discography ==
- "KIZUNA": Solos and classical guitar duets with Japanese guitarist Minoru Inagaki.
- "AQUARELLES": Classical guitar solos. Works from the repertoire and personal compositions.

== Composer ==
His best-known compositions, when no publisher is indicated, are published at Productions d'Oz.

- Allégorie en forme de valse - ed. Alphonse Leduc.
- As always (homage to Per-Olov Kindgren)
- Ballad for a Friend (homage to Akira Asada)
- Canto bajo la Luna
- Chanson d'Elfée
- Comme une pavane - ed. Alphonse Leduc.
- Complainte
- Cuando me vuelvo en el camino
- Dans la brume
- Deux aquarelles
1. El azul de tus ojos
2. Souvenirs d'Algarve
- Élégie
- Elegy for the Children of Ukraine
- Evocation nostalgique (homage to Nobutaka Nakajima)
- Incantation magique
- Jardin secret
- Juanito, el guitarrero (homage to Jun Nakano)
- Kizuna (homage to Minoru Inagaki)
- Kobe in my heart (homage to Nobuko Tanaka)
- La Cité d'Emeraude (homage to Sylvain Lemay)
- Ma fille (homage to Oriane Bellini)
- Memories of Tateshina
- Night Song
- Paysage catalan
- Poema nostalgico
- Pour un reflet dans l’eau
- Rising Sun
- Sakura's Flowers
- Santa Ana Cruz
- Simple Song for Lily (homage to Kei Hamada)
- Snow in my heart
- Snow Sonata
- Somewhere Under the Rainbow
- Storybook
- Song for Johanna
- Sous le ciel d'Akashi (homage to Minoru Inagaki)
- Suite des Constellations
1. Andromède
2. Orion
3. Cassiopée
- Souvenirs de Cervera - ed. Alphonse Leduc.
- Sweet Bonnie Dickinson
- The white Castel (homage to Takayuki Kamei)
- Three friends in Kyoto
- Un Jour de septembre

He has also composed many pieces for various instrumental ensembles such as:

- À la lumière de l'aube (duo)
- Alter Ego (duo) (homage to Minoru Inagaki)
- As the Seasons Go By (quartet)
- Au loin vers le sud (duo) - ed. Alphonse Leduc.
- Géralda (duo) - ed. Alphonse Leduc. (homage to Geraldine Raymond)
- Mélancolie for guitar quartet
- Quant au matin tu t'éveilles (trio)
- A Rainbow for Minoru (duo) (homage to Nobuko Tanaka and Nobutaka Nakajima)
- Sous le ciel d'Akashi (in solo form, on the one hand, and quintet, on the other) (homage to Minoru Inagaki).
- Twilight Serenade (guitars and string quartet)
- When I Look at the Stars (duo for clarinet and guitar) (homage to Mio Inagaki)
