= Raúl Borges =

Venezuelan musician (1882–1967)

Raúl Borges Requena (4 February 1882 – 24 November 1967) was a Venezuelan pedagogue, guitarist and composer.

Borges is mainly known today for having taught Alirio Díaz, Antonio Lauro, Rodrigo Riéra, and other Venezuelan guitarists. Many of his compositions for guitar were published in Madrid with Union Musical Española, including:

- Canción antigua
- Canción de cuna in D (also in G)
- El Criollito
- Fuente morisca
- Marisol
- Vals Venezolano
- Vals sobre motivos franceses
