= Bartolomé Calatayud =

Spanish musical artist (1882–1973)

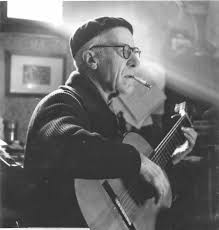

Background information
- Born: Bartolomé Calatayud Cerdá; 8 September 1882; Palma de Mallorca, Spain
- Died: 11 April 1973 (aged 90) Palma de Mallorca, Spain
- Occupations: Guitarist, Composer
- Years active: 1890-1970

Bartolomé Calatayud (8 September 1882– 11 April 1973) was a Spanish classical guitar composer, teacher and performer. He was born in 1882 on the island of Mallorca. In 1899, while still a teenager, he was awarded the Diploma of Honour 1st Class by the Workers Instructive Centre Palma for his "superior musical knowledge in guitar playing." A contemporary and friend of Miguel Llobet and Andrés Segovia, he studied guitar first with Pedro Antonio Alemany Palmer (Palma 1862–1952), and then with Antonio Gomez Melters (1839–1908). He studied harmony and composition with the great Majorcan musicologist and composer D. Antonio Noguera. Bartolomé was also taught by Francisco Tárrega in Valencia.

He gave concerts in Spain, France, Switzerland, Portugal and Algiers and toured South America with Spanish Chorus and Dance groups. In Majorca he composed many works for the classical guitar and taught the instrument. Many of his guitar works are based on popular Catalan/Majorcan folk music.

Bartolomé Calatayud wrote music for classical guitarists of various skill levels. He taught pupils in Majorca during his later years, and died in 1973 at the age of 90.

== Works for guitar ==
- Alegre Campina E Major
- Alegre Primavera E Major
- Boceto Andaluz
- Cuatro Piezas Faciles Para Guitarra: Vals, Cancion De Cuna, Romanza, Pasodoblillo
- Cuatro Juguetes: Boceto Andaluz, Gavotta, Danza, Minueto
- Cubanita A Major
- Danza Espanola E Minor
- Danza Popular De Campdevanol A Major
- Dos Piezas Para Guitarra: Bolero, El Majo
- Dos Piezas Para Guitarra: Bagatela, Gavota
- Estampa Gitana D Minor
- Galop G Major
- Gavota Facil A Major
- Guarjirita - Sobre Temas Populares D Major
- Habanera A Minor
- Marcha Hungara A Minor
- Marcha Militar A Major
- Minueto E Major
- Nostalgia E Minor
- Pequena Tarantela F♯ Minor
- Sonatina No. 1 A Minor
- Sonatina No. 2 D Minor
- Suite Antiqua: Antante, Zarabanda, Pavana, Minueto, Rondino
- Tango Argentino A Minor
- Tango D Major
- Tres Canciones Populares Catalanas: Muntanyes Regalades, La Preso De Lleida, La Pastoreta
- Tres Piezas Faciles Para Guitarra: Cajita De Musica, Divertimento, Melodia
- Tres Piezas Para Guitarra: Mazurka, Caramba!(Habanera), Canconeta
- Tres Piezas Para Guitarra: Lamento Gitano - Solea, Fandanguillo, Bulerias
- Triptico Para Una Dama: Bondad, Simpatia, Alegria
- Una Caricia E Major
- Vals E Minor
- Vals Y Mazurka
- Zambra D Minor

His works are mostly published by Unión Musical Ediciones, Madrid
