= Juan Falú =

Argentine classical guitarist and composer

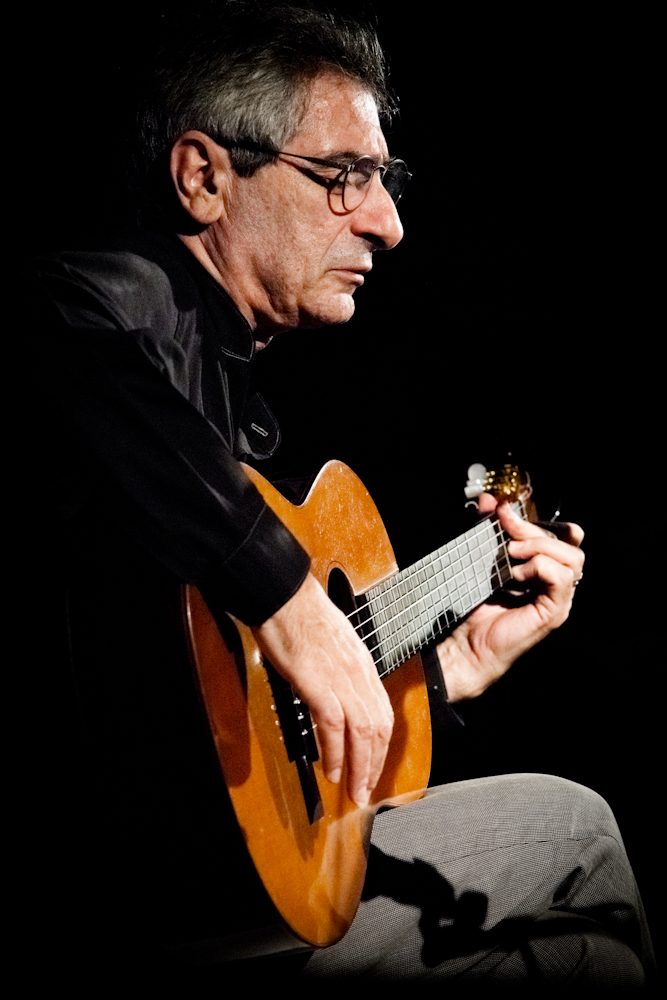

Alfredo Juan Falú (born October 10, 1948) is an Argentine classical guitarist and composer.

He was born in Tucumán in 1948, to a family of Syrian descent. His uncle, Eduardo Falú, was by then a well-known folk guitarist. A psychoanalyst by profession and adherent of left-wing peronism during the 1970s, Falú was forced into exile after losing his brother, Lucho, to Argentina's notorious "Dirty War."

He returned to Buenos Aires after 1983 and later began teaching at the Manuel de Falla Music Conservatory. He received, among other awards, the 2005 Konex Award for best folklore group together with Liliana Herrero. Falú continues to perform in solo concerts and with other prominent figures in Argentine folklore.

He is the brother of architect and social activist Ana Falú, disappeared student activist Luis Eduardo Falú, and lawyer and politician Dr. Jose Ricardo Falú.
