= Brian Head (composer) =

American musician

Brian Head (born October 14, 1964) is an American composer, guitarist, and music theory and composition professor.

He performs frequently as a soloist and collaboratively with numerous groups, including the Los Angeles Philharmonic, the Los Angeles Opera, New World Symphony, inauthentica, Jacaranda and Xtet. His compositions have been widely performed throughout the U.S. and abroad.

Brian Head holds an unusual dual appointment at the Thornton School of Music at the University of Southern California, where he is a member of both the Classical Guitar and the Composition faculties, positions he has held since 2001. He maintains an active guitar studio there, lectures on a wide range of subjects, and directs the music theory program. As of 2010, he is the acting chair of the Classical Guitar department and currently serves as Associate Dean for Academic Affairs.

Heads is Artistic Director of the Guitar Foundation of America. From 2004 to 2010, he was its president.

== Training ==
Raised in Adelphi, Maryland, Brian Head is the son of the noted trumpeter Emerson Head and his first wife Linda Head, a piano teacher and professional accompanist. He received undergraduate degrees from the University of Maryland in both Music and Mathematics, and a master's degree from the University of Southern California in guitar performance, receiving recognition as Outstanding Thornton School Graduate of 1991.

Notable guitar teachers include Anthony Norris, William Kanengiser, and James Smith.

== Notable compositions ==
- "Sketches for Friends" (1994) was first recorded by William Kanengiser for his album Rondo alla Turka.
- "John McLaughlin: We Know You Know: Reverie for Mahavishnu" (2004) is featured on the Los Angeles Guitar Quartet's Grammy Award-winning album, Guitar Heroes.
- "Chant" and "Fanfare" are included in Scott Tennant's technique handbook Pumping Nylon.
