= James Lentini =

American academic administrator (born 1958)

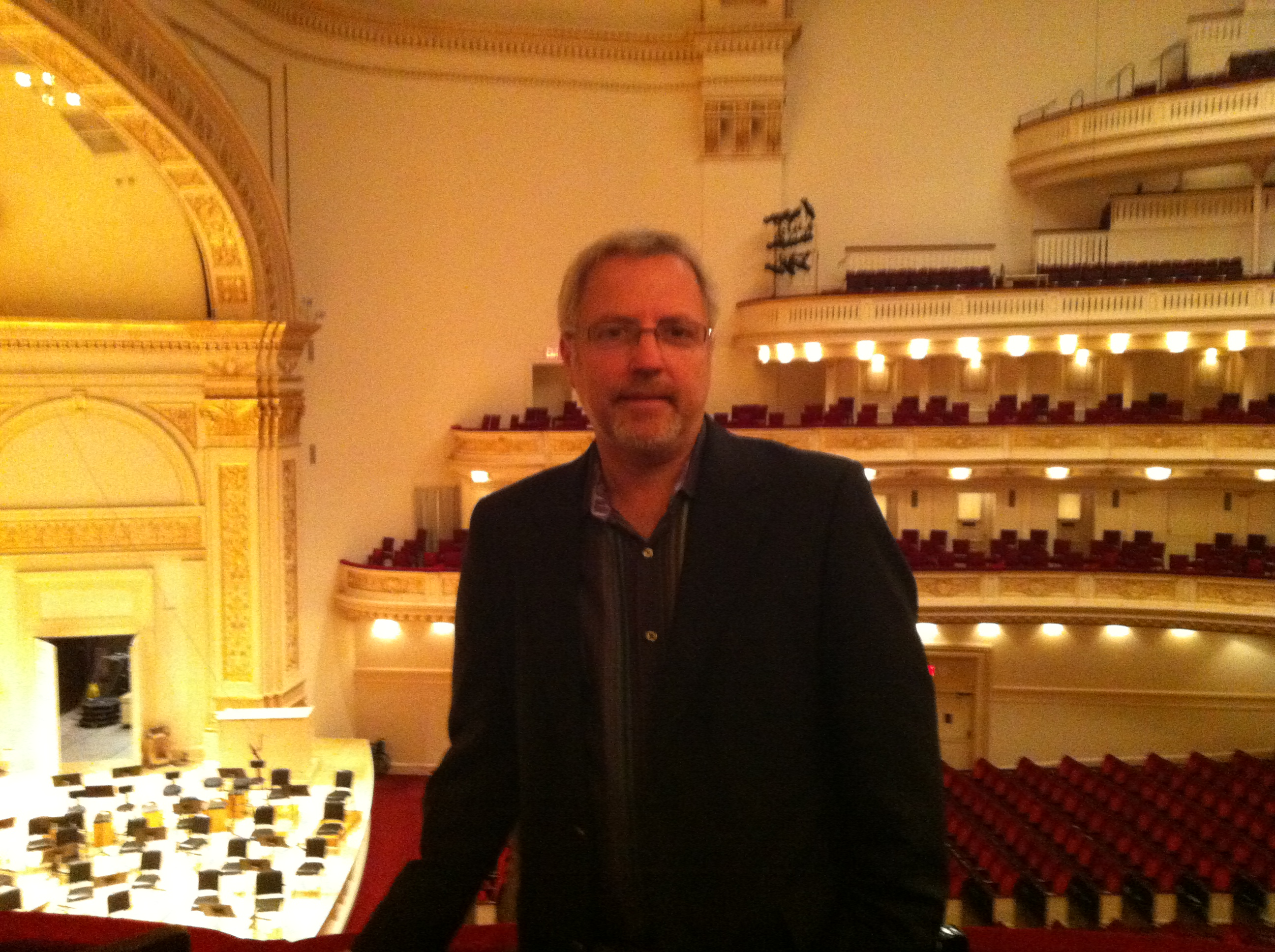

7th President of Molloy University
- Incumbent
- Assumed office June 1, 2020
- Preceded by: Drew Bogner

Personal details
- Born: February 7, 1958 (age 68) Detroit, Michigan, U.S.
- Education: Wayne State University (BM); Michigan State University (MM); University of Southern California (DMA)
- Occupation: Composer; guitarist; Academic administrator
- Website: jameslentini.net

James Lentini (born February 7, 1958, in Detroit, Michigan) is an American composer, guitarist, and academic administrator.

After completing undergraduate studies at Wayne State University in guitar performance and composition, he pursued a master‘s degree in composition at Michigan State University and a doctorate from the University of Southern California, where he studied composition with Robert Linn and Morten Lauridsen. In addition to composing, Lentini is a guitarist who has studied with William Kanengiser, Joe Fava, and Charles Postlewate.

== Compositions ==
His music has been performed by solo artists such as guitarist William Kanengiser and by international ensembles including the Krakow Philharmonic (Poland) and the Bohuslav Martinů Orchestra (Czech Republic). In addition to many commissions, his honors include first prize in the 2004 Choral Composition Contest at Bluffton University for his composition "Peace I Leave With You," the 2002 Andrés Segovia International Composition Prize for his solo guitar piece "Westward Voyage," the Atwater-Kent Composition Award (first Prize), the McHugh Composition Prize, a grant from "Meet the Composer," and several awards from ASCAP. In 2003, Lentini participated as a juror in the Segovia International Guitar Competition in La Herradura, Spain. He has been a Visiting Artist at the American Academy in Rome, and his work has been featured in new music festivals throughout Europe and the United States. In reviewing the recording "James Lentini, Chamber Music," released on the American Classics series by Naxos Records, critic Laurence Vittes, writing in Gramophone Magazine, called Lentini a "...typical classical music success story," and went on to describe Lentini's composition "Scenes from Sedona" by stating that "...the pièce de résistance of the disc may be 'Scenes from Sedona,' perhaps the best piece for viola and cello since Beethoven’s 'Eyeglasses' duet. In 2009, Lentini's suite for solo guitar entitled "The Four Seasons" was published by Mel Bay.

== Academic career ==
From 2003 to 2007, Lentini served as the founding Dean of the School of Art, Media, and Music at The College of New Jersey. Previously, Lentini held the position of Professor of Composition at Wayne State University from 1988 to 2003, where he also served as Acting Chair and Associate Chair of the Department of Music. In 2007, Lentini accepted the appointment of Dean of the School of Creative Arts at Miami University in Oxford, Ohio, overseeing the Departments of Music, Art, Theatre, and Architecture/Interior Design, in addition to the Performing Arts Series and the University Museum. He is recognized as an arts advocate and fundraiser through his efforts to promote the importance of the arts in education. In 2012, his new musical arrangement of Miami University's Alma Mater was performed in Carnegie Hall.

In 2013, Lentini received a Career Achievement Award in the Field of Music from Wayne State University. In May, 2013, he was named as the Senior Vice President for Academic Affairs and Provost at Oakland University in Rochester, MI.

In 2020, he was named as president of Molloy College.

== Publications and recordings ==
His works are published by Mel Bay, Editorial de Musica Española Contemporanea, Acoma Editions, Doberman-Yppan, and the Society of Composers, Inc. Recordings appear on the Navona, Naxos, Capstone, and CRS recording labels.
