= Evan Hirschelman =

- Born: Detroit, Michigan, U.S.
- Genres: Classical, Crossover music
- Occupations: Musician, composer
- Instrument: Classical guitar
- Labels: Dream Design Music, Telarc, Hal Leonard
- Website: www.theguitarist.net

Evan Hirschelman is an American classical guitarist and composer, born in Detroit, Michigan.

He is known as a classical composer who incorporates a wide range of musical styles into his writing. His music has been recorded by some of today's most respected musicians, including the Los Angeles Guitar Quartet and Chinese guitarist Xuefei Yang. His composition Lament and Wake is featured on the Grammy award-winning recording LAGQ's Guitar Heroes.

He is known as an expressive artist who integrates extended techniques such as tapping and slapping into his playing style. He has collaborated with diverse artists, including jazz-fusion pioneer Rick Laird of the Mahavishnu Orchestra, classical guitarist Scott Tennant, rock guitarist Paul Gilbert, and the late jazz guitarist Ted Greene. Hirschelman's recording Water in Darkness contains original and contemporary solo guitar works and duets.

Hirschelman is the author of Acoustic Artistry: Tapping, Slapping, and Percussion Techniques for Classical & Fingerstyle Guitar, published by Hal Leonard Corporation; which has been translated to multiple languages by De Haske Publications, Europe. Hal Leonard also released his book Classical Guitar Chops, which analyzes guitar technique throughout the history of classical guitar repertoire. His music is included in the newest edition of the guitar book Pumping Nylon. Hirschelman has served on the faculty at several colleges, including the Musicians Institute, and currently runs a private teaching studio and regularly gives masterclasses and workshops.

== Books ==
- Classical Guitar Chops: Essential Techniques and Exercises to Maximize Your Technique (Hal Leonard Publications)
- Acoustic Artistry: Tapping, Slapping, & Percussion Techniques for Classical & Fingerstyle Guitar (Hal Leonard Publications)
- Tapping Slapping & Percussion: Spieltechniken für die Akustikgitarre (De Haske Publications/Hal Leonard) - German language
- La Guitare Percussive: Tapping, Slap Et Techniques De Percussion Pour La Guitare Classique Et Folk (De Haske/Hal Leonard) - French language
- Akoestisch Meesterschap: Tapping, slapping en percussietechnieken voor klassieke & fingerstyle gitaar (De Haske/Hal Leonard) - Dutch language

== Compositions ==
- Pace and Approach
- Unfeathered As We Are
- May The Notes Be With You (2 movements)
- Minds that Go!
- 3 Meditations (3 movements)
- Homage to Michael Hedges
- Water in Darkness
- Shapeshifting (2 movements)
- Sextuplets on the Beach
- Giuliani on Acid
- Fleeting Movement
- Etude #1
- Fistful of Notes
- Ornamentality
- Tapping Etude # One
- Textures for Guitar Quartet (4 movements)
- Textures for Solo Guitar
