= Maureen Gannon =

American diabetes researcher

- Occupation: Diabetes researcher
- Awards: Paul Lacy Medal

Academic background
- Education: Weill Cornell Medicine

Academic work
- Institutions: Vanderbilt University

Maureen Anne Gannon is an American diabetes researcher. She is a Fellow of the American Association for the Advancement of Science. She won the Paul Lacy Medal Award.

She graduated from Molloy University, Adelphi University, and Weill Cornell Medicine.

She is Professor of Medicine and Associate Dean for Faculty Affairs at Vanderbilt University.

== Works ==
- Kawaguchi, Yoshiya; Cooper, Bonnie; Gannon, Maureen; Ray, Michael; MacDonald, Raymond J.; Wright, Christopher V.E. (2002). "The role of the transcriptional regulator Ptf1a in converting intestinal to pancreatic progenitors". Nature Genetics. 32 (1): 128–134. doi:10.1038/ng959. ISSN 1061-4036.
- Zhang, Peichuan; McGrath, Barbara; Li, Sheng'ai; Frank, Ami; Zambito, Frank; Reinert, Jamie; Gannon, Maureen; Ma, Kun; McNaughton, Kelly; Cavener, Douglas R. (June 1, 2002). "The PERK Eukaryotic Initiation Factor 2α Kinase Is Required for the Development of the Skeletal System, Postnatal Growth, and the Function and Viability of the Pancreas". Molecular and Cellular Biology. 22 (11): 3864–3874. doi:10.1128/MCB.22.11.3864-3874.2002. ISSN 1098-5549. PMC 133833. PMID 11997520.
- Brissova, Marcela; Shostak, Alena; Shiota, Masakazu; Wiebe, Peter O.; Poffenberger, Greg; Kantz, Jeannelle; Chen, Zhongyi; Carr, Chad; Jerome, W. Gray; Chen, Jin; Baldwin, H. Scott; Nicholson, Wendell; Bader, David M.; Jetton, Thomas; Gannon, Maureen; Powers, Alvin C. (November 1, 2006). "Pancreatic Islet Production of Vascular Endothelial Growth Factor-A Is Essential for Islet Vascularization, Revascularization, and Function". Diabetes. 55 (11): 2974–2985. doi:10.2337/db06-0690. ISSN 0012-1797. PMID 17065333.
