= Guitar Hero (disambiguation) =

Guitar Hero is a series of music video games published by RedOctane.

Guitar Hero may also refer to:

- Guitar Hero (video game), the first video game in the series
- "Guitar Hero", a song by Amanda Palmer from her solo album Who Killed Amanda Palmer
- Guitar Hero (Guitar Superstar since 2008), a yearly competition by Guitar Player magazine to see who is the best guitar player in the world
- Guitar Heroes, a 2004 album by the Los Angeles Guitar Quartet
