= Tomi Räisänen =

Finnish composer (born 1976)

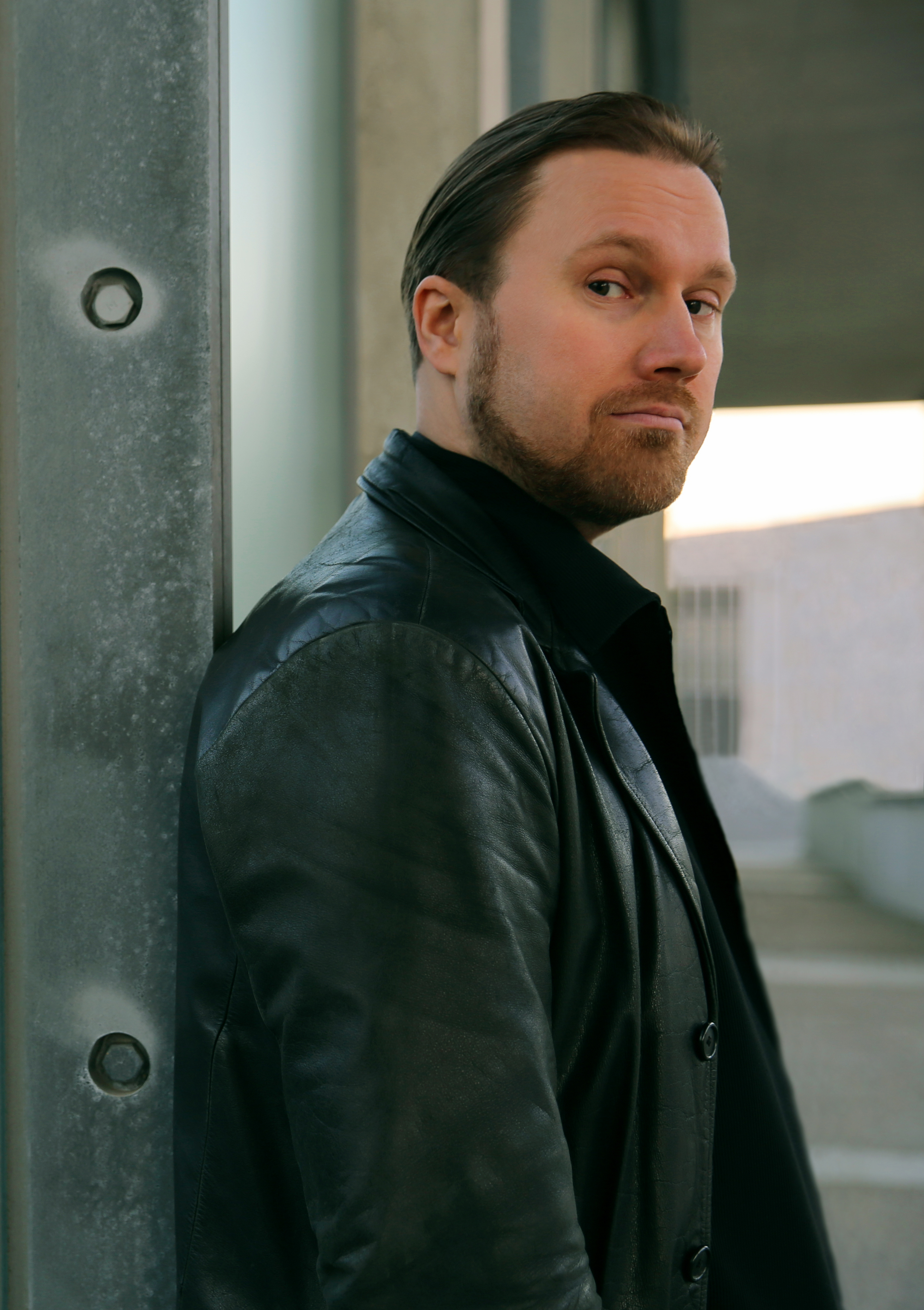
- Tomi Räisänen in 2015
- Born: 2 June 1976 (age 50); Helsinki, Finland
- Era: Contemporary

Tomi Räisänen (Finnish pronunciation: [ˈtomi ˈræi̯sænen]; born 2 June 1976) is a Finnish composer.

== Biography ==
Räisänen was born in Helsinki. He studied composition from 2000 to 2006 at the Sibelius Academy under Erkki Jokinen graduating as a master of music. Before entering the Sibelius Academy he read music at the University of Helsinki studying musicology and composition under Harri Vuori. He has also participated in several international composition masterclasses, seminars and workshops under composers such as Louis Andriessen, Brian Ferneyhough, Jonathan Harvey, Michael Jarrell, Jouni Kaipainen, Magnus Lindberg, Philippe Manoury and Marco Stroppa.

Since the early 2000s Räisänen's list of works has rapidly grown and contains around 100 compositions covering works from solo pieces to chamber and choral music, and includes orchestral works and concertos. Räisänen is one of the most performed composers of his generation in Finland. His music has been widely performed and broadcast in 44 countries across Europe, North and South America, Asia and Australia.

His works have received numerous awards: Organ Concerto Pulmo won the grand prize in the International Kaija Saariaho Organ Composition Competition 2023. Same year, the youth orchestra work Kalalle won 2nd Prize in Pirkanmaan Pinna Composition Competition. In 2022, choir work Kiire won 2nd prize in the P. J. Hannikainen Choral Composition Competition. In 2021, Räisänen won two composition competitions: The Siuntio 560 (Lux Musicae) Composition Competition with the ensemble work Tele and the Composition Competition for the Tampere Piano Competition with the work Hile. In 2019, Marimba Concerto Portal was awarded 3rd prize and it won the Audience Prize in the IV International Uuno Klami Composition Competition in Finland. In 2007, Räisänen won the international Irino Prize (shared prize) in Japan with his work Stheno (2006). In year 2002 he won 2nd prize in the International Composing Competition “2 Agosto” in Italy with work Nomad.

== Awards and honors ==
- 2023: Winner of the grand prize in the International Kaija Saariaho Organ Composition Competition with the Organ Concerto Pulmo
- 2023: 2nd prize in the Pirkanmaan Pinna Composition Competition (Finland) with the work Kalalle
- 2022: 2nd prize in the P. J. Hannikainen Choral Composition Competition (Finland) with the work Kiire
- 2021: 1st prize in the Siuntio 560 (Lux Musicae, Finland) Composition Competition with the work Tele
- 2021: 1st prize in the Composition Competition for the Tampere Piano Competition (Finland) with the work Hile
- 2019: 3rd prize and winner of the audience prize in the IV International Uuno Klami Composition Competition (Finland) with the Marimba Concerto Portal
- 2007: 1st prize (shared) in The Irino Prize Competition (Tokyo, Japan) with the work Stheno (2006)
- 2002: 2nd prize in the International Composing Competition “2 Agosto” (Bologna, Italy) with the work Nomad (2002)

== Works ==
- Å (2023) music for stage work
- Kalalle (2023) orchestra
- Regula (2023) microtonal guitar, microtonal horn
- Pulmo (Organ Concerto, 2022)
- Kotona (2022) koto, string quartet
- Crossings (2022) contrabass solo, tape
- Kiire (2021) choir (SSSAA) a cappella
- Under the Apple Tree (2001/2021) bassoon quartet
- Sale of Airbags (2021) recorder, guitar, tape
- Tele (2021) ensemble, TV set
- Portal (Marimba Concerto, 2018/2021) version for orchestra
- Superspreader (2021) bass recorder solo
- @ch (2020) clarinet, cello, piano
- Hile (2020) piano solo
- L'homme armé (2003/2010/2020) alto saxophone, percussion duo
- Kiseki-no-ippon-matsu (2020) violin duo
- Inside a Mechanical Clock (2008/2020) guitar, contrabassoon, accordion
- Axis Mundi (Double Concerto for Bassoon & Contrabassoon, 2020)
- Verso (2019) alto flute, viola, contrabass, piano, tape
- Fanfare (2019) wind ensemble
- i0! (2019) bass flute, paetzold recorder, harp, harpsichord, tape
- Portal (Marimba Concerto, 2018) version for sinfonietta
- Unknown (2018) solo flute, tape
- Dialogue with... (2018) music and sound design for video work
- Juoni (2018) theorbo solo, tape
- Magus Magnus (2008/2017) orchestra
- Smash!t (Horn Concerto, 2016)
- Falls (2016) piano six hands
- Under the Apple Tree (2001/2016) sax trio
- No-Go (2011/2016) violin duo
- Cornucopia (2015) recorder, viola da gamba, harpsichord, tape
- Pikkuväki (2015) recorder solo, tape
- Inside a Mechanical Clock (2008/2015) mandolin, guitar, keyboard
- Dive (2015) recorder solo, tape
- Theia (2015) orchestra
- Ouvrez la Tête (2014) piano solo
- Inside a Mechanical Clock (2008/2014) accordion duo
- Midsommar(so)natten (2010/2014) violin duo, tape
- Väki (2013) solo horn, tape
- Mirrie Dancers (Alto Flute Concerto, 2013)
- No-Go (2011/2013) brass quartet
- We shall meet in the place where there is no darkness (2013) video work / sound installation
- Inside a Mechanical Clock (2008/2013) 2 recorders, theorbo
- Taiga (2012) recorder quintet, tape
- Hiisi (2012) bass clarinet, cello, piano
- Tea with the Devil (2012) film music
- Louhen Loitsut (2012) wind orchestra
- Aulos at the Dionysian Feast (2004/2012) 3 recorders, bass clarinet, 2 perc.
- No-Go (2011) alto flute, violin
- Balloon Work (2011) guitar, 4 balloon players
- Around the Circle (2004/2011) recorder, cello, harpsichord
- Puumies (2011) orchestra
- Die Sauna der 7 Brüder (2010/2011) chamber orchestra, tape
- Sublunar Mechanics (Piano Concerto, 2011)
- Gatekeepers (2003/2010) recorder, accordion
- Ludi Caeli (2006-2010) brass quintet
- Die Sauna der 7 Brüder (2010) ensemble, tape
- Gatekeepers (2003/2010) clarinet, accordion
- Midsommar(so)natten (2010) violin, cello
- Around the Circle (2004/2010) clarinet, viola, piano
- Laavlâ (2010) solo soprano + wind orchestra, tape
- Under the Apple Tree (2001/2009) recorder trio
- Fortuna Favoris (2009) solo soprano, mixed choir, orchestra
- A Night at the Park Güell (2009) baryton (viola da gamba), viola, cello
- Grus (2008) cello, accordion, tape
- Inside a Mechanical Clock (2008) contrabass, accordion
- Magus Magnus (2008) chamber orchestra
- Kyynelketju (2007) recorder solo
- Broken Flower (2007) ensemble
- The City Listens (2007) Choir (SATB) a cappella
- Under the Apple Tree (2001/2007) harpsichord, accordion
- Liquid Mosaic (2007) 2 guitars, tape
- Almtraum (2006) oboe, trombone, cello, piano
- Stheno (2006) recorder tubes, prepared guitar, tape
- Dreamgate (2006) toy pianos, tape
- Giant Butterfly (2006) solo contrabass + chamber orchestra
- Delirium Nocturnum (2006) orchestra
- Under the Apple Tree (2001/2006) flute, a.flute, clarinet, b.clarinet
- Abeyance (2005) chamber orchestra
- Sea of Tranquility (Guitar Concerto, 2005)
- Piano Quintet (2005) piano, string quartet
- Forged (2005) guitar solo
- Aulos at the Dionysian Feast (2004) 2 recorders, guitar
- Around the Circle (2004) flute, viola, piano
- Lacrimosa (2004) 4 voices, ensemble
- Triquad (2004) horn, trombone, tuba, harp
- Euryale (2004) clarinet, alto saxophone, piano
- Duo Concertante (2004) solo cl./bass cl. and solo acc. + ensemble
- Insiders (2004) grand piano played by 3 musicians
- Under the Apple Tree (2001/2004) recorder quartet
- Gatekeepers (2003) sheng, accordion
- Follow the Circle (2003) clarinet, violin, cello, piano
- Elevator Music on Mars (2003/2009) sax., electric gtr., synth., perc., tape
- Time Labyrinth (2003) cello solo
- Under the Apple Tree (2001/2003) wind orchestra
- L'homme armé (2003) alto saxophone, percussion
- Peilisali (2002) accordion solo
- Nomad (2002) solo violin + orchestra
- Under the Apple Tree (2001/2002) orchestra
- Battaglia (2002) big band
- Under the Apple Tree (2001) piano solo
- Diabolic Dialogue (2001) clarinet (or oboe), cello
- Two Gardens (2000) flute, cello, piano
- Nexus (2000) flute, piano, mixed choir
- Némulat (1999) baryton, piano, violin

== Discography ==
- Insiders - junctQín Keyboard Collective: Stephanie Chua, Elaine Lau, Joseph Ferretti (reTHINK, Redshift Records, 2020)
- Die Sauna der 7 Brüder, Sea of Tranquility, Mirrie Dancers, Grus - Mikko Ikäheimo, Carla Rees, Neue Musik im Ostseeraum (Sauna, Ensemble Works, Edition Troy EDTCD 005, 2016)
- Väki - Tommi Hyytinen (Tired Light, Pilfink Records JJVCD-162, 2016)
- Midsommar(so)natten - Mainly Two: John Garner, Marie Schreer (Synergy, Turquoise Coconut, 2016)
- Under the Apple Tree - Bravade Recorder Quartet (Reflections of the Past and Present, Pilfink Records JJVCD-128, 2014)
- Abeyance - Ensemble Modern, John B Hedges (they are, Ensemble Modern Medien EMCD-021/22, 2013)
- Euryale - Heikki Nikula, Olli-Pekka Tuomisalo, Risto-Matti Marin (Chambersax, Pilfink Records JJVCD-123, 2013)
- A Night at the Park Güell - Finnish Baryton Trio (Luminous Baryton, Edition Troy EDTCD 002, 2012)
- L'homme armé - Olli-Pekka Tuomisalo, Aki Virtanen (SaxCussion, OPTCD-11009, 2011)
- Ludi Caeli - Helsinki Brass Quintet (H.B.Q., Edition Troy EDTCD 001, 2011)
- Stheno - Erik Bosgraaf, Izhar Elias (big eye, phenom records PH0713, 2007)
- Under the Apple Tree - Elisa Järvi (PianoNyt!, Sibelius Academy SACD 17, 2004)
