= Richard Smith (American guitarist) =

American jazz guitarist

Richard Smith (born in Detroit) is an American jazz guitarist. Smith teaches at University of Southern California's Thornton School of Music.

== Solo albums ==
- Rockin the Boat 1989
- Puma Creek 1989 (originally released as Inglewood in Japan)
- Bella Firenze 1991
- From My Window 1994
- First Kiss 1997
- Flow 1999
- Natural Soul 2002
- Soulidified 2003
- LA Chillharmonic 2008
- Tangos 2014 - with Dutch/Colombian pianist, Tico Pierhagen, Brian Bromberg (bass) and Gene Coye (drums). A Chillharmonic Media release
