= John Dearman =

- Born: Minneapolis, Minnesota, U.S.
- Genre: Classical
- Occupation: Musician
- Instrument: Guitar
- Member of: Los Angeles Guitar Quartet

John Dearman is a Grammy Award-winning classical guitarist and one of the founding members of the Los Angeles Guitar Quartet (LAGQ). Known to LAGQ fans as the group's seven-string virtuoso who supplies the deep-bass lines for numerous pieces in the quartet's eclectic repertoire.

Dearman holds a Bachelor of Music and Master of Music from the Thornton School of Music at the University of Southern California.

He is on faculty at California State University, Northridge.
