= Guitar Heroes =

LAGQ's Guitar Heroes

Studio album by Los Angeles Guitar Quartet
- Released: 2004
- Genre: Classical
- Length: 61:17
- Label: Telarc

Professional ratings
Review scores
| Source | Rating |
|---|---|
| Allmusic | link |

The Los Angeles Guitar Quartet's Guitar Heroes (2004) won best Classical-Crossover Album at the 47th Grammy Awards. The album pays respect to guitarists that have influenced LAGQ. It is widely regarded as the Los Angeles Guitar Quartet's best record to date.

While the only member of the quartet to include his own compositions on the album is Andrew York, the other members arranged different pieces.

Composers on the album include Andrew York, Pat Metheny, Ralph Towner, Evan Hirschelman, Brian Head, Bryan Johanson, Chet Atkins and Steve Howe.

The guitarists who influenced the LAGQ on the album include: Jimi Hendrix, Michael Hedges, John Mclaughlin, Los Romeros, Chet Atkins, Frank Zappa and Django Reinhardt.

== Track listing ==
1. "Icarus" (Ralph Towner) – 3:33
2. "B&B" (Andrew York) – 4:17
3. "We Know You Know" (Brian Head) – 5:00
4. "Pluck, Strum, Hammer" (Bryan Johanson) – 4:15
5. "Letter from Home" (Pat Metheny) – 3:26
6. "Uarekena" (Sergio Assad) – 8:19
7. "Mood for a Day" (Steve Howe) – 4:13
8. "Gypsy Flower" (Matthew Dune) – 5:59
9. "Pop" (Andrew York) – 2:17
10. "El Baile de Luis Alonso" (Gerónimo Giménez) – 3:22
11. "Lament and Wake" (Evan Hirschelman) – 6:11
12. "Let's Be Frank" (Bryan Johanson) – 6:30
13. "Blue Echo/Country Gentleman" (Chet Atkins) – 3:05
