= Bruce Alan Brown =

American musicologist

Bruce Alan Brown is a professor of musicology at the USC Thornton School of Music Los Angeles, California.

== Life and career ==
Bruce Alan Brown acquired degrees from the University of California at Berkeley (BA 1977, MA 1979, PhD 1986), and also studied harpsichord with Gustav Leonhardt at the Sweelinck Conservatorium, Amsterdam.

Brown's research concerns the music of the later eighteenth century, theatre-music, performance practice, music in Vienna, Austria, and musical iconography. From 2005 to 2007 he served as Editor-in-Chief of the Journal of the American Musicological Society.

== Publications ==
- Gluck and the French Theatre in Vienna (Oxford, 1991)
- W. A. Mozart: Così fan tutte (Cambridge, 1995)
- W. A. Mozart: Idomeneo: Kritischer Bericht, in Mozart: Idomeneo. Neue Ausgabe sämtlicher Werke ed. by Daniel Heartz (Kassel: Bärenreiter, 2005)
- The Grotesque Dancer on the Eighteenth-Century Stage: Gennaro Magri and His World (ed., with Rebecca Harris-Warrick; Madison, 2005)

== Critical editions ==
- Christoph Willibald Gluck: Le Diable à quatre (Kassel, 1992)
- Christoph Willibald Gluck: L'Arbre enchanté (1775 Versailles version) (Kassel, 2009)
- Christoph Willibald Gluck: L'Arbre enchanté (1759 Vienna version) (Kassel, 2015)
