= Lorin Alexander =

American composer

Lorin Alexander (born 1948) is an American classical composer of orchestral, chamber and solo works.

== Early life and education ==
Alexander is a native of Los Angeles, California, United States. Born November 13, 1948, she began composing at the age of eight, inspired by her study of piano performance. Alexander studied composition with Roy Harris as a teenager.

She received bachelor and master's degrees in Piano Performance from the University of Southern California School of Music. As a graduate, Alexander continued her composition studies with Walter Scharff at the University of California, Los Angeles. She studied orchestration with Albert Harris.

== Career ==
Alexander is a composer of orchestral and chamber works, as well as compositions for solo instruments. She is the recipient of several commissions by new music groups, including most recently local symphonic groups as the Orchestra Nova, Calico Winds, the Santa Cruz Symphony, and the University of Redlands.

Alexander's music has been praised as "lyrical, rhythmically driven," and her talent for "using the colors of the orchestra brilliantly."

Woodwind Quintet was originally commissioned by the Great Notes ensemble of Long Beach, California in 2001. The ensemble was founded in 1996 as a venue for soloist principal woodwinds to develop unique styles through playing in a quintet with others. The work has been performed by several ensembles, most recently by the chamber ensemble Calico Winds of Glendale, California.

Prologue for orchestra was commissioned by Ransom Wilson to open the New Music Concert at the Idyllwild Arts Academy in 2002. It was performed by the Redlands Symphony Orchestra to open their concert season for 2004–2005 and by the Santa Cruz Symphony as the opening of their 2006–2007 season.

Alexander has also been commissioned to write music for music for children's performance. The Los Angeles Cultural Affairs Department commissioned the 1992 work Cuatro Cuentos para Cuatro Manos, a collection of Mexican and Latin children's stories. The four movements are composed for 4-hand piano duet. It has been arranged in two versions (intermediate/advanced) for performance by adults or children.

Orchestra Nova of San Diego commissioned and performed the world premiere of Alexander's piece Flight March 16–18, 2013. The piece was performed as part of a program called Fly and was the featured composition in the concerts.

== List of works ==
- Flight (2012) commissioned by Orchestra Nova, San Diego
- Romp (2007) music for orchestra or two pianos
- Prologue (2001) music for orchestra
- Woodwind Quintet (2001) three movements, music for orchestra or solo piano (I. Meditation II. Dance III. Jest)
- Suite for Piano (1989, revised 2007) four movements for piano (I. Journey II. Lullaby III. Uncharted Road IV. Dance Around)
- Journey (1998) arrangement for orchestra
- Uncharted Road (1997) arrangement for orchestra
- Lullaby (1996) arrangement for orchestra
- Isaiah (1994) liturgical for SATB choir, violin, flute, cello, piano, and percussion
- Jazz Dance (1993)
- Cuatro Cuentos para Cuatro Manos (1992) piano duet, 4-hand (I. Cante flamenco II. Marimbas III. Allegrias IV. Danza Bahal)

== Personal life ==
Alexander lived in Idyllwild, a mountain community outside of Los Angeles, where she taught and composed from her home. She died November 6, 2013, as a result of cancer.
