= Moontower (band) =

American electro-pop band

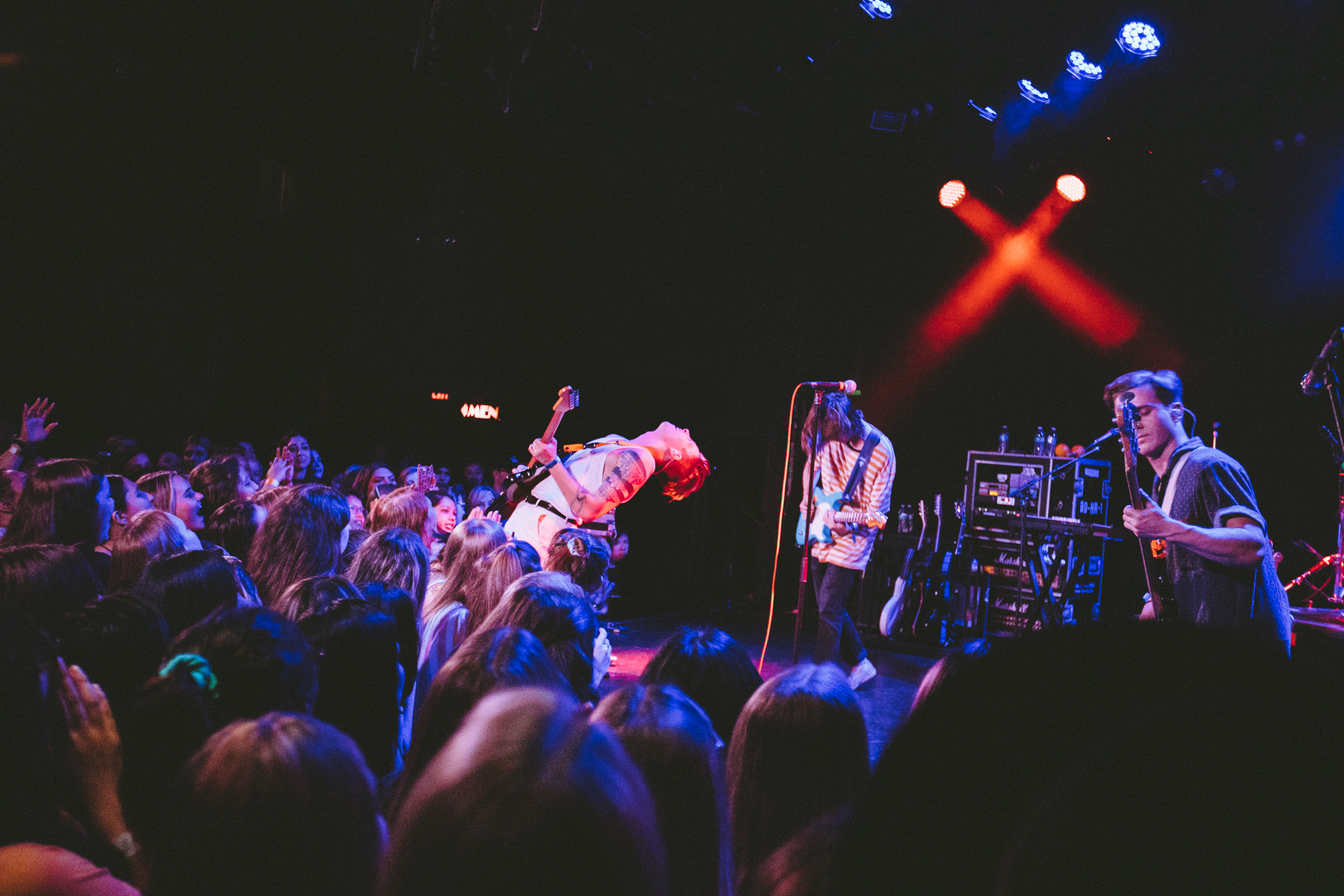
- Moontower performing in 2019

Background information
- Origin: Los Angeles, California
- Genres: Electro-pop; indie electronic
- Years active: 2018-Present
- Members: Jacob Berger; Tom Carpenter; Devan Welsh
- Website: thisismoontower.com

Moontower is an electro-pop Los Angeles–based trio consisting of Jacob Berger (guitar/vocals), Tom Carpenter (electronic drums/bass), and Devan Welsh (guitar/keyboards). Originating at the University of Southern California, the band is known for their conceptual content and "highly visual" live shows.

== History ==
=== Formation ===
All three members of Moontower attended the USC Thornton School of Music, which is where they met and formed their band. Inspired by a Lemaitre concert they attended, the trio decided to start a project which began as "a crossover between alternative songwriting and electronic music production" according to Berger. Their band name was chosen as a reference to the 1993 film Dazed and Confused and implies the inclusive community they sought to establish in their fanbase. Moontower began playing parties and on-campus gigs in 2018 followed by shows around southern California soon thereafter, including a show opening for Bad Suns, before they released any music.

=== Season 1: The Ballad of William Hollywood EP (2018–2019) ===
Moontower released their debut single "William" in April 2018, inspired by one of the trio’s housemates, William Hollywood, who also directed and appeared in the song's music video. The single accumulated 100,000 streams in its first two weeks. The next two singles continued the story of William Hollywood, with "Leaving You Behind" in July 2018 and "Long Hair" in October 2018. After sold out shows at the Moroccan Lounge and the Echo in Los Angeles in October 2018 and January 2019 respectively, as well as a string of tour dates supporting The Driver Era and Cold War Kids in March 2019, Moontower released their debut EP Season 1: The Ballad of William Hollywood on May 9, 2019. The 7 track concept album focuses on its titular character as a vehicle for the band to convey their own upbringings and adolescent experiences, and was accompanied by a 3 episode video series following him in a "story of love, loss, and recovery in a psychedelic suburbia." That summer the band promoted their release on a tour supporting Night Riots, and made their first major festival appearance at Reading & Leeds. Season 2 is in the pre-production stage.

=== What Day Is It? EP (since 2020) ===
Moontower released 3 additional singles in the first half 2020: "Rerun" in February, "Bury Me" in March, and "Got My Way" in May, inspired by Berger's mothers' heart attack. In July, the band released their first collaborative single "Guess I'm Jaded" with Goldroom after meeting him at the Satellite in Silver Lake, which was later remixed by RAC among other artists on a remix EP released that August. Though the band's 2020 headline tour was postponed due to the COVID-19 pandemic, they put on a virtual tour in July presented by Bandsintown. The four-night interactive "What Day Is It?" tour benefitted Know Your Rights Camp and NIVA, and featured 4 different openers, all of whom were meant to open for Moontower on their postponed tour. On August 28, 2020, Moontower released their sophomore EP What Day Is It? featuring singles previously released in 2020 in addition to "Hit The Lights", all of which they performed in a live video of the same title released in May. "Hit the Lights" was accompanied by a video inspired by Vanessa Carlton's "A Thousand Miles" and reached #1 on KROQ's "Locals Only" program.

== Performances ==
Moontower are known for their energetic live performances, which they bear mind in their songwriting as they intend for their songs to be experienced live. Over the course of their career they have opened for COIN, YUNGBLUD, Bad Suns, Night Riots, The Driver Era, Cold War Kids, Social House, Magic Giant, YUNG BAE, and Sub-Radio.

== Discography ==
=== EPs ===
| Title | Album details |
|---|---|
| Season 1: The Ballad of William Hollywood | Released: May 9, 2019; Formats: digital download, streaming; Label: Self released |
| What Day Is It? | Released: August 28, 2020; Formats: digital download, streaming; Label: Self released |

=== Singles ===
| Title | Year | Album |
|---|---|---|
| "William" | 2018 | Season 1: The Ballad of William Hollywood |
| "Rerun" | 2020 | What Day Is It? |
| "Bury Me" | 2020 | What Day Is It? |
| "Got My Way" | 2020 | What Day Is It? |
| "Hit The Lights" | 2020 | What Day Is It? |
| "Guess I'm Jaded" | 2020 | Non-album singles |
| "State of Mind" | 2022 | Non-album singles |
| "Who Knew?" | 2022 | Non-album singles |
| "Poolside" | 2022 | Non-album singles |
