= Frank Potenza (guitarist) =

American jazz guitarist

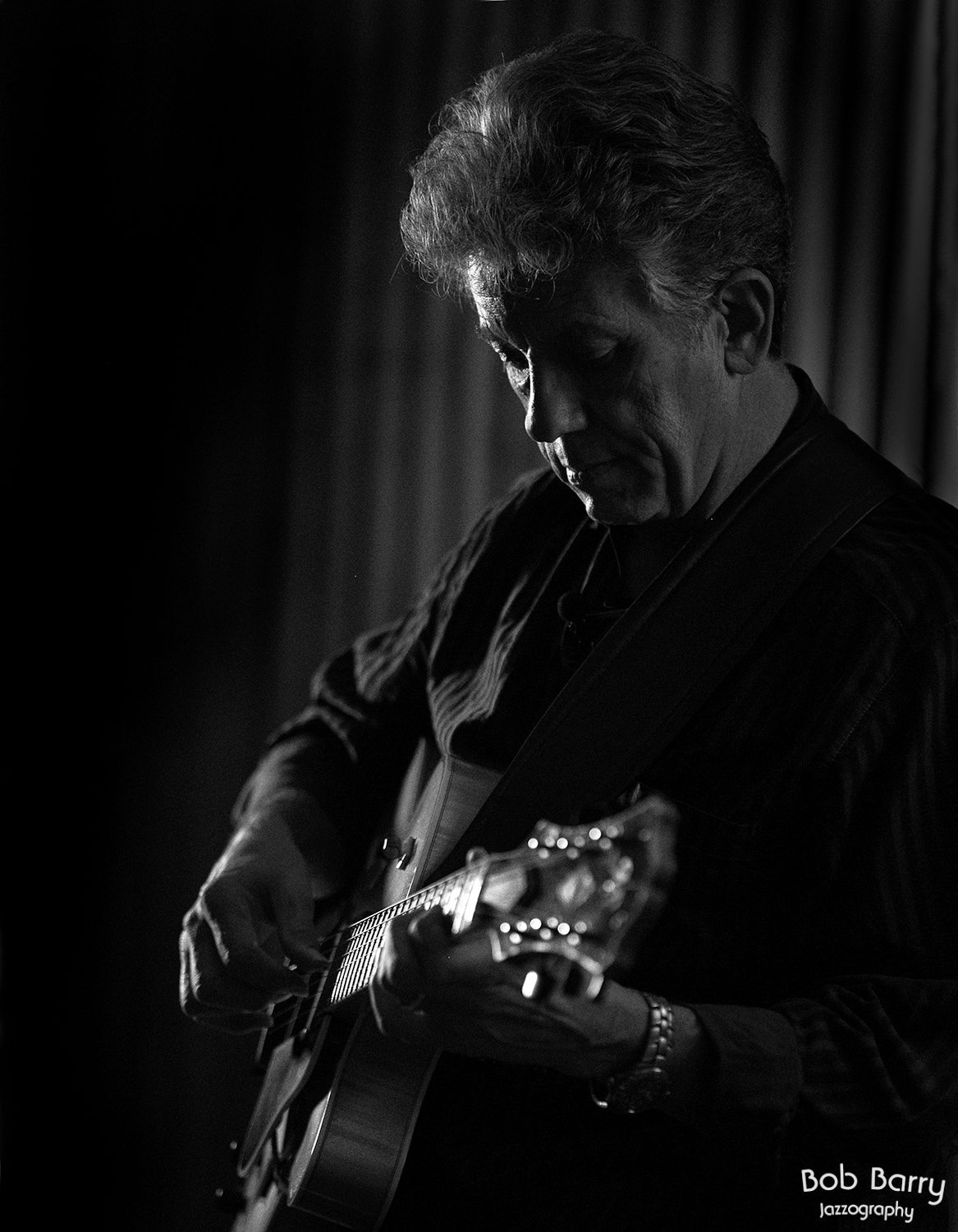
- Performing at Brand Library & Art Center in 2014

Background information
- Born: February 10, 1950 (age 76); Providence, Rhode Island
- Genre: Jazz
- Occupation: Musician
- Instrument: Guitar
- Years active: 1970s–present
- Labels: Azica, Capri
- Website: frankpotenza.com

Frank Potenza (born February 10, 1950) is an American jazz guitarist.

== Early life ==
A native of Providence, Rhode Island, Potenza started playing his sister Norma's acoustic guitar. At age 12, he was influenced by his cousin, Jimmy Gagliardi, who "played and sang in rock and roll shows and nightclubs", drove a convertible, smoked Lucky Strikes, and was "the epitome of cool". Gagliardi taught Potenza guitar parts from the R&B songs of the day, especially Duane Eddy and Bill Doggett tunes. He was exposed to jazz via his father's record collection, but by his early teens, Potenza was more interested in the electric guitar sounds of rock and roll.

By the early 70s, Potenza returned to jazz after hearing George Benson. This led him to other jazz guitarists, such as Pat Martino and Wes Montgomery. After high school, he attended the Berklee College of Music in Boston, graduating in 1972 with a bachelor's degree in music. During the rest of the 1970s, Potenza he with jazz bands at clubs in New England, including with Diamond Centofanti.

== Association with Joe Pass ==
In 1974, Potenza took his father to see Joe Pass perform at the Jazz Workshop in Boston. Potenza was a fan of Pass's albums Intercontinental, Virtuoso, and The Trio. After the concert, Potenza made his way to Pass's dressing room, shook his hand, and asked if he was giving lessons while in town. According to Potenza, "I had my first lesson with him the very next day, and that was the beginning of a 20-year friendship with him. It was a great blessing to be able to spend as much time as I got to spend with Joe." Their friendship lasted until May 1994, when Pass succumbed to liver cancer.

== Jazz educator ==
In 1981, Potenza moved to Los Angeles. From 1981 to 1995, he was an adjunct instructor on the Commercial Music Program faculty at Long Beach City College. During this time, the Commercial Music Program was directed by George Shaw, who was instrumental in bringing in guest musicians to play with the student big band. In 1995, Potenza joined the faculty of the Studio/Jazz Guitar Department at the University of Southern California's Flora L. Thornton School of Music. In 2000, he completed his Master's in Music at California State University in Los Angeles. Shortly after, Potenza was promoted to full professor at USC. In 2006, he became chair of the Studio/Jazz Guitar Department at USC, stepping down in 2018.

== Career ==
Throughout the 1980s, Potenza recorded a jazz albums for TBA Records as a solo artist. Soft & Warm rose to the Top 10 in Billboard magazine's Contemporary Jazz chart, while Sand Dance made the Top 15. From 1984–1985, he toured with jazz saxophonist Ronnie Laws, younger brother of flautist Hubert Laws.

In 1996 he became a touring member of the Gene Harris Quartet, which lasted until Harris's death in 2000. Potenza is a featured soloist on Alley Cats, Harris' final album for Concord Records. Potenza has worked with Mose Allison, Joe Diorio, Mundell Lowe, John Pisano, Joe Sample, Bud Shank, Lonnie Smith, and George Van Eps.

His album For Joe is a tribute to guitarist Joe Pass. For the recording, Potenza used the same rhythm section Pass used on his 1964 album For Django. This includes John Pisano (guitar), Jim Hughart (bass), and Colin Bailey (drums).

In 2017 he was inducted into the Rhode Island Music Hall of Fame.

== Awards and honors ==
- Dean's Faculty Award for Excellence in Teaching, 2009
- Rhode Island Music Hall of Fame, 2017

== Discography ==
=== As leader ===
- Sand Dance (TBA Records, 1986)
- Soft & Warm (TBA, 1987)
- When We're Alone (TBA, 1988)
- Express Delivery (TBA, 1989)
- In My Dreams (Azica, 1999)
- The Legacy (Azica, 2003)
- First Takes (Azica, 2005)
- Old New Borrowed & Blue (Capri, 2009)
- For Joe (Capri 2013)

=== As sideman ===
- Gene Harris, Alley Cats (Concord Jazz, 1999)
- Wilton Felder, Love Is a Rush (MCA, 1987)
