= USC Thornton School of Music =

Music school in California

Coordinates: 34.023132°N 118.285435°W

- Type: Private
- Established: 1884
- Parent institution: University of Southern California
- Dean: Jason King (2023–present)
- Faculty: 200
- Undergraduates: 500
- Postgraduates: 450
- Location: Los Angeles, California, United States
- Website: music.usc.edu

The USC Thornton School of Music is a private music school in Los Angeles, California. Founded in 1884 only four years after the University of Southern California, the Thornton School is the oldest continually operating arts institution in Los Angeles. The school is located on the USC University Park Campus, south of Downtown Los Angeles.

The Thornton School is noted for blending the rigors of a traditional conservatory-style education with a progressive approach to training the next generation of musicians. Highly regarded internationally, the school is widely ranked as one of the top 10 schools of music in the United States.

== History ==
The USC Thornton School of Music was founded in 1884 and dedicated in 1999. It was named in honor of philanthropist Flora L. Thornton following a $25 million gift from her foundation. At the time, this was the largest donation to a school of music in the United States. In 2006, she donated an additional $5 million to support the facility needs of the school.

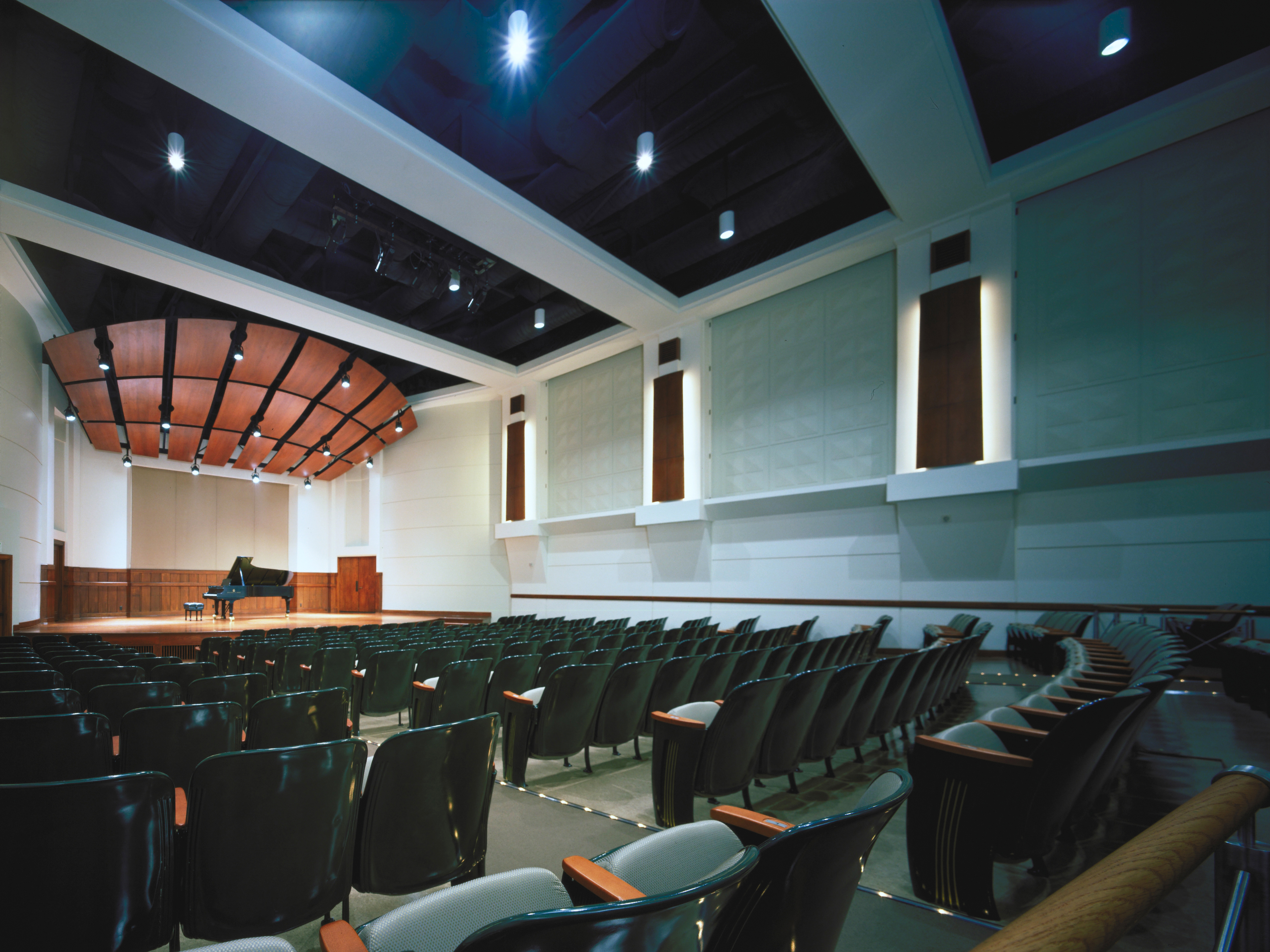
Credit: USC Thornton School of Music

In 2023, Jason King was announced as the new dean of USC Thornton, following Robert Cutietta stepping down at the end of 2022.

== Programs ==
USC Thornton offers Bachelor's, Master's and Doctorate degrees in more than 20 disciplines across the school's three divisions – Classical Performance and Composition, Contemporary Music, and Research and Scholarly Studies. Many disciplines also offer graduate certificates.

Thornton was one of the first schools of music to offer an undergraduate program in music industry, and currently offers both a Bachelor of Science and a Master of Science in Music Industry. Thornton offers the only comprehensive program in Scoring for Television and Film. It also has a program in studio guitar performance.

In 2017, USC Thornton launched new professional master's degree programs in Arts Leadership; Community Music; and Music Industry, designed to train musicians in new ways to imagine a contemporary music career.

In 2018, USC Thornton announced a new model of classical music education for undergraduate Classical Performance and Composition students. Hallmarks of USC Thornton's redesigned curriculum include restructured lessons, rehearsals, and classes.

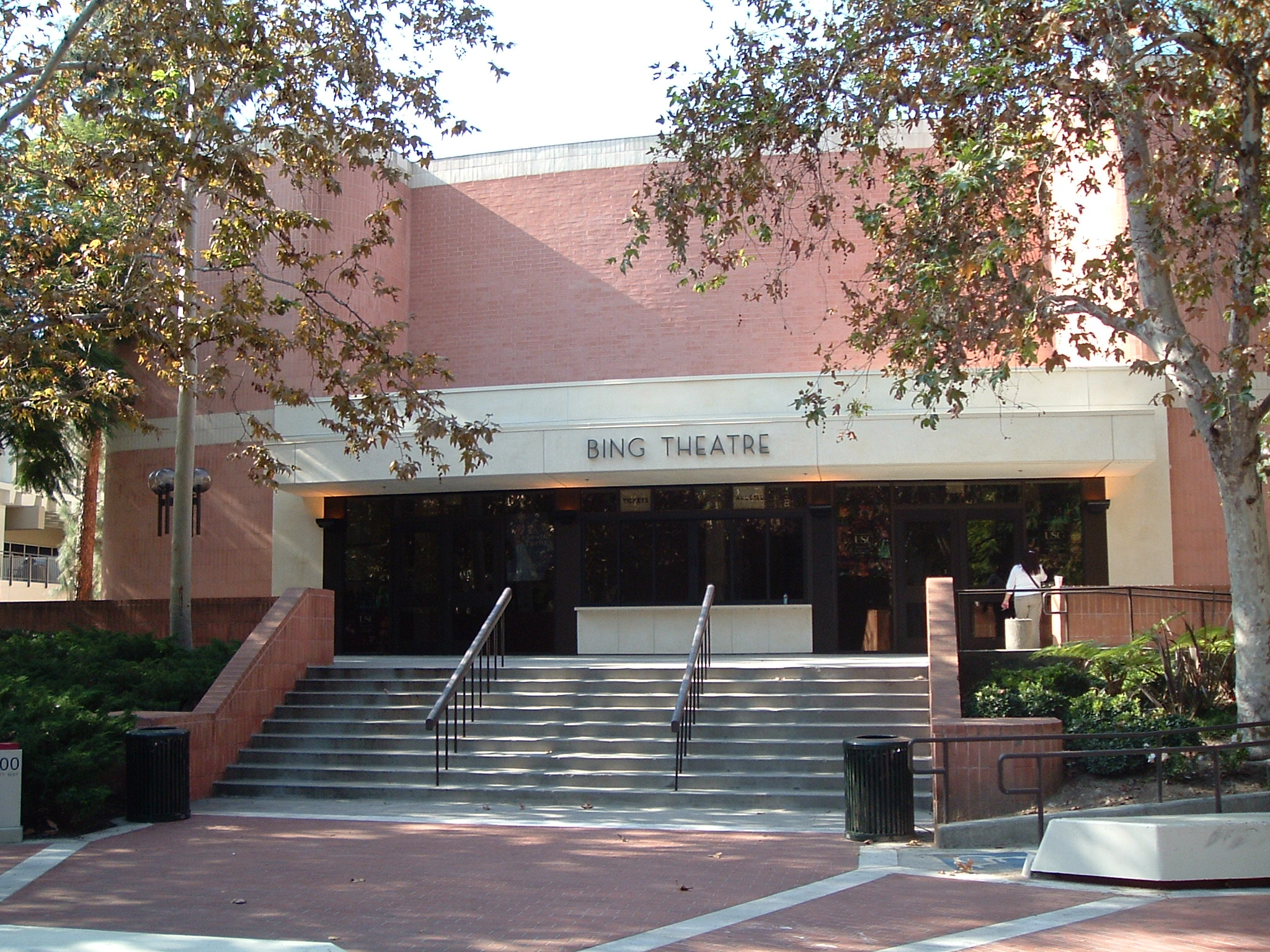
Bing Theatre

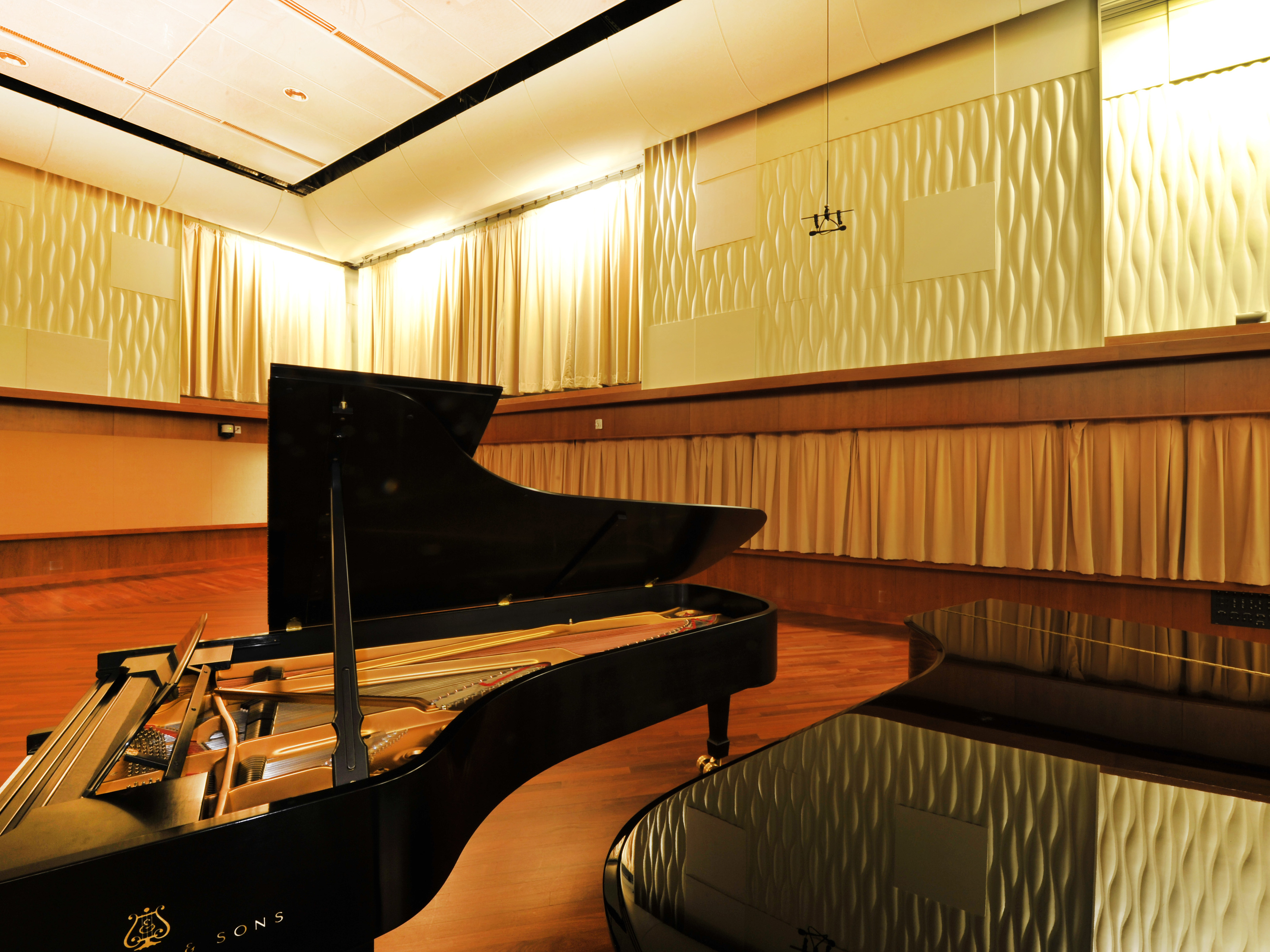
Credit: USC Thornton School of Music

== Performance halls and studios ==
- Bing Theatre
- Bovard Auditorium
- Carson Center
- Joyce J. Cammilleri Hall
- MacDonald Hall
- Newman Hall
- Ramo Hall
- Schoenfeld Symphonic Hall
- Songwriter's Theater
- Tommy's Place

== Faculty ==
In 2007, USC Thornton alumnus and Distinguished Professor of Composition Morten Lauridsen became the eighth classical composer to receive the National Medal of Arts. Two years later, in 2009, Michael Tilson Thomas, alumnus and Judge Widney Professor of Music at USC Thornton, also received the National Medal of Arts.

=== Choral music ===
- Suzi Digby
- Jo-Michael Scheibe

=== Classical guitar ===
- Brian Head
- William Kanengiser
- Pepe Romero
- Scott Tennant

=== Composition ===
- Camae Ayewa
- Stephen Hartke, Distinguished Professor Emeritus of Composition
- Ted Hearne
- Veronika Krausas
- Morten Lauridsen, Distinguished Professor Emeritus of Composition
- Andrew Norman

=== Conducting ===
- Carl St.Clair
- Michael Tilson Thomas, Judge Widney Professor of USC

=== Jazz studies ===
- Luciana Souza
- Clarence Penn
- Jason Goldman
- Otmaro Ruiz
- Roy McCurdy
- Vince Mendoza
- Bob Mintzer
- Darek Oles
- Josh Nelson
- Bob Sheppard

=== Keyboard studies ===
- Michael Arrom
- Stewart Gordon
- Jeffrey Kahane
- Daniel Pollack
- Brooks Smith
- Bernadene Blaha
- Kevin Fitz-Gerald

=== Music education ===
- Robert Cutietta

=== Music industry ===
- Kevin Lyman
- Brian Malouf
- Richard Wolf

=== Musicology ===
- Bruce Alan Brown

=== Music production ===
- Rick Schmunk
- Doug Petty
- Sean Holt
- Brian Malouf
- Christian Amonson
- Charles Gutierrez
- Michael "Smidi" Smith

=== Popular music ===
- Paul Jackson Jr.
- Alphonso Johnson
- Patrice Rushen

=== Screen scoring ===
- Laura Karpman
- Garry Schyman
- Christopher Young

=== Strings/Harp ===
- Glenn Dicterow
- Karen Dreyfus
- Ralph Kirshbaum
- Andrew Shulman
- JoAnn Turovsky

=== Studio/Jazz guitar ===
- Bruce Forman
- Frank Potenza
- Richard Smith

=== Theory/Aural skills ===
- Brian Head
- Veronika Krausas

=== Vocal arts and opera ===
- Rod Gilfry

=== Winds and Percussion ===
- Yehuda Gilad
- Julie Landsman
- Jim Self
- Allan Vogel
- James Walker

== Notable alumni ==
- Michael Abels, composer
- Lorin Alexander, composer
- Herb Alpert, trumpeter and co-founder of A&M Records
- Piotr Anderszewski, pianist
- Alejandro Aramburu, singer-songwriter, guitarist and member of Santos Bravos
- Christophe Beck, film and television score composer
- Marco Beltrami, film score composer
- Alec Benjamin, singer and songwriter
- Robert Bernhardt, conductor
- Jerry Blackstone, choral conductor
- Bruce Broughton, composer
- Harold Budd, ambient/avant-garde composer
- Roberto Cani, concertmaster, Los Angeles Opera Orchestra
- Todd Carey, singer-songwriter and musician
- Reeve Carney, singer-songwriter and musician
- William Edward Childs, jazz pianist and composer
- Nicolas Chumachenco, violinist
- Gerald Clayton, jazz pianist
- Louis Cole, multi-instrumentalist and singer-songwriter
- Rozzi Crane, singer-songwriter
- Daedelus, producer and multi-instrumentalist
- Tamar Davis, R&B singer
- John Dearman, classical guitarist
- Martin Denny, creator of exotica music
- Alan de Veritch, principal violist, New York Philharmonic; principal violist, Los Angeles Philharmonic
- Glenn Dicterow, retired concertmaster, New York Philharmonic
- Eldar Djangirov, jazz pianist
- Dean Drummond, composer and conductor
- William Eddins, conductor
- Taylor Eigsti, jazz pianist
- Jack Eskew, arranger/orchestrator
- Flea (Michael Balzary), bassist, trumpeter and actor
- Grace Fong, pianist and music educator
- Nmon Ford, baritone
- John Frizzell, film and television score composer
- Neil Galanter, concert pianist
- Kathryn Gallagher, singer and actress
- Sara Gazarek, jazz musician and singer
- Grant Gershon, conductor and pianist
- Rod Gilfry, opera baritone
- Renée Elise Goldsberry, actress
- Jerry Goldsmith, film score composer
- Ludwig Göransson, composer and conductor
- Annie Gosfield, composer
- Donald Grantham, composer and music educator
- Maria Grenfell, composer
- Danny Grissett, jazz pianist
- Tina Guo, cellist
- Tigran Hamasyan, jazz pianist
- Thomas Hampson, lyric baritone
- Lionel Hampton, jazz musician
- Lisa Harriton, singer, songwriter and keyboardist
- Jane Henschel, soprano
- Wataru Hokoyama, composer
- Marilyn Horne, mezzo-soprano
- James Horner, film score composer
- James Newton Howard, film score composer
- Izza, singer and rapper
- Paul Jackson Jr., jazz fusion guitarist
- Tommy Johnson, film and television tubist, tuba pedagogue
- Martin Katz, piano accompanist, conductor and music educator
- Vladimir Khomyakov, classical pianist
- King Princess, singer and songwriter (incomplete degree)
- Rudolf Koelman, violinist, professor and recording artist
- Thomas Kotcheff, composer
- Robert Kral, film score composer
- Giorgi Latso, concert pianist and composer
- Morten Lauridsen, composer
- Benjamin Lees, composer
- Christopher Lennertz, film and television score composer
- Charles Lloyd, jazz musician
- Bear McCreary, television score composer
- Mark McKenzie, composer
- Jensen McRae, singer and songwriter
- Angela Meade, Metropolitan Opera principal artist, soprano
- Moonchild, alternative R&B band
- Moontower, electro-pop trio
- Ronald Muldrow, jazz musician
- MUNA (Katie Gavin and Josette Maskin), indie pop band
- Roger Neill, film and television score composer
- Kelley O'Connor, mezzo-soprano
- Martin O'Donnell, composer for video games
- Christopher Parkening, classical guitarist
- Leonard Pennario, pianist
- Jeff Peterson, slack key guitarist
- P. Q. Phan, composer of contemporary classical music
- Cynthia Phelps, principal violist, New York Philharmonic
- Elizabeth Pitcairn, violinist
- Harvey Pittel, saxophonist
- Gene Pokorny, principal tuba, Chicago Symphony Orchestra
- Basil Poledouris, film score composer
- Harve Presnell, singer and actor
- Brian Ralston, film score composer
- Robert Ralston, pianist and organist
- Lee Ritenour, session musician
- Jessica Rivera, soprano
- Leroy Robertson, composer and music educator
- Robert Xavier Rodriguez, composer
- Douglas Romayne, film and television score composer
- Nathaniel Rosen, cellist
- Elizabeth Rowe, principal flute, Boston Symphony Orchestra
- Patrice Rushen, R&B singer, songwriter, composer and pianist
- Stefan Sanderling, conductor
- William Schmidt, composer
- Garry Schyman, composer for film, television and video games
- Tom Scott, session musician
- Daniel Slatkin, film score composer
- Elise Solberg, pianist, composer, and songwriter
- Jason Solowsky, film score composer
- Thomas Stevens, trumpeter, composer and educator
- Tomas Svoboda, composer and music educator
- Salli Terri, singer and songwriter
- Michael Tilson Thomas, conductor, composer and pianist
- Fiona Thompson, cellist
- Martin Tillman, composer and cellist
- Oleg Timofeyev, musicologist and classical guitarist
- Dale Turner, singer-songwriter, multi-instrumentalist and producer/arranger
- Zeynep Üçbaşaran, pianist
- Video Game Pianist (Martin Leung), classical pianist
- Walter Werzowa, composer and founder of Musikvergnuegen
- Mack Wilberg, conductor, composer and arranger; director, Mormon Tabernacle Choir
- Remi Wolf, singer and songwriter
- Andrew York, classical guitarist and composer
- 24kGoldn, artist and rapper (incomplete degree)
