= Anisa Angarola =

American guitarist

Anisa Angarola is one of twelve guitar soloists selected nationwide to perform in the historic 1980 master class given by Andrés Segovia. She is also founder of the renowned Los Angeles Guitar Quartet, recording and touring with the group for ten years to international acclaim. Performances included the Hong Kong Arts Festival, Wigmore Hall in London, Carnegie Hall, Teatro Nacional María Guerrero in Madrid, Zurich Tonhalle, the International Cervantino Festival of Mexico, international radio-television broadcasts including ZDF Mainz, Germany.

Angarola has also concertized with maestro Angel Romero and with the Romeros Quartet.

In 1991, she founded the Angarola Guitar Quartet combining a group of international guitarists to commission new repertoire for guitar ensemble. Urban Toys by Lloyd Rogers and Quartet in C by minimalist Michael Bayer have been premiered by her quartet, which was critically acclaimed for its precision and virtuosic performances by the Los Angeles Times and by the European press.

A long-time fan of Ireland's musical tradition, Angarola's Irish Airs and Dances was on the ballot of the 1992 Grammy Awards. With ten-time All-Ireland Champion, fiddler Seamus Connolly, she recorded in Dublin for Radio Telefís Éireann, that performance now part of the RTÉ archives. Angarola has recorded and performed numerous times with Connolly, most recently on her CD Birdwatcher Hill.
