= Sub-Radio =

American pop band

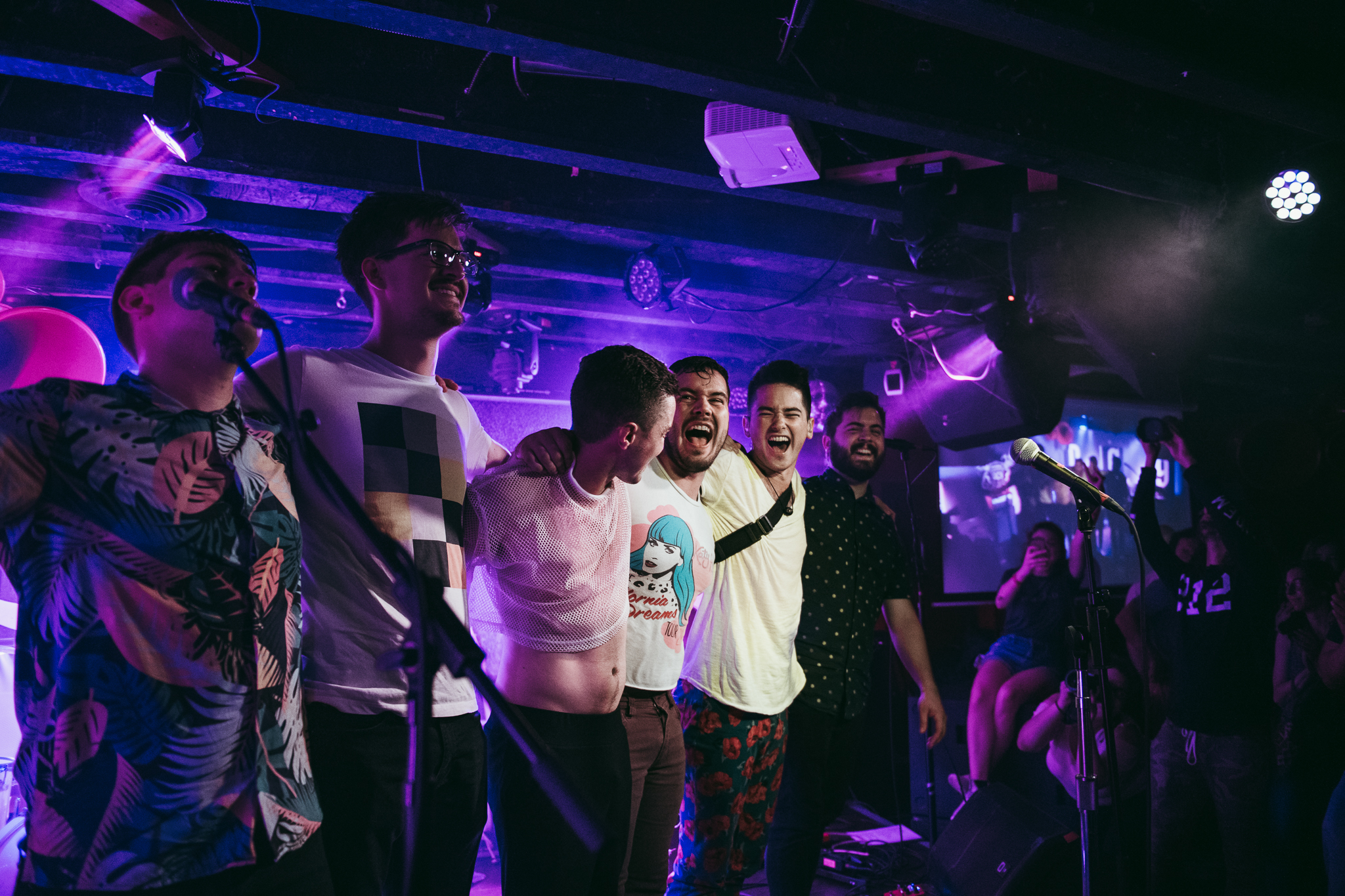
- Sub-Radio performing in Washington, D.C., in 2019 Left to right: Matt Prodanovich, John Fengya, Adam Bradley, Barry Siford, Michael Pereira, Kyle Cochran

Background information
- Also known as: Sub-Radio Standard
- Origin: Washington, D.C.
- Genres: Indie pop; Pop rock; Indie rock; Synth rock
- Years active: 2016–present
- Label: Th3rd Brain
- Members: Adam Bradley; Kyle Cochran; John Fengya; Michael Pereira; Matt Prodanovich
- Past members: Mike Chinen; Mark "Barry" Siford
- Website: sub-radio.com

Sub-Radio is an American indie pop band based in Washington, D.C. Their sound has been described as "infectious, bright pop," "gorgeous vocal harmony," and “tailor-made for festival sing-alongs.” Their music has been critically compared to that of The Killers, The Aces, and Panic! at the Disco.

== History ==
The members who would become the band met in middle school. Guitarist Matt Prodanovich started the band with keyboard player and guitarist John Fengya in 2009 while still in high school in Sterling, Virginia, however, the band did not formally release music until 2016. The group independently released their debut album, Same Train // Different Station, in March 2016, changing their name from the original Sub-Radio Standard. They have opened for Smallpools and Vinyl Theatre, and made an appearance at the 2017 Firefly Music Festival.

Following the release of two followup EPs — Headfirst (2018) and Dog Years (2019) — the band played more than 30 dates on a U.S. tour in the summer of 2019. Their EP Thoughts Lights Colors Sounds, featuring lead single "Disco," was released in August 2020. One song on the EP, "Fair Fight", featured vocals from Max Bemis of Say Anything.

Unable to tour during the pandemic, Prodanovich had noticed the number of people watching live streams on Reddit and that there was a potential to reach new fans. Starting in October 2020 Sub-Radio starting streaming on Reddit's open access platform called Reddit Public Access Network (RPAN). The streams quickly caught on, and Sub-Radio streams have been seen by over 7 million unique viewers. These viewers translated beyond Reddit to a 250% increase in the number of monthly listeners on music platforms Spotify and Apple Music.

They released a following EP, Past Selves (2023), and conducted a two-part tour around the United States from fall 2023 to spring 2024, ending in Somerville, Massachusetts. The band Moontower opened at each stop along the tour.

Sub-radio completed a sold out UK tour in February 2025 with stops in Glasgow, Manchester, Birmingham, Brighton and London. In July of 2025, the band closed their Sunrise City tour with back to back sold out shows at the 9:30 Club in Washington, DC. Over the two shows, the band performed some 40 different songs.

In March of 2026, the band performed a special 10 year anniversary show of the Same Train // Different Station release show at the Jammin' Java club in Northern Virginia. The new album included some revisions for a couple of the original songs and the addition of 4 new tracks.

== Discography ==
=== Studio albums ===
- Same Train // Different Station (2016)
- Sunrise City (2025)
- Same Train // Different Station 10 year anniversary (2026)

=== Extended Plays ===
- Holiday Hangover EP (2017)
- Headfirst EP (2018)
- Dog Years EP (2019)
- Thoughts Lights Colors Sounds EP (2020)
- Past Selves EP (2023)

== Band members ==
=== Current members ===
- Adam Bradley – lead vocals (2016–present)
- Kyle Cochran – guitar, keyboards, backing vocals (2019–present), bass (2022-present)
- John Fengya – keyboards, guitar, backing vocals (2016–present)
- Michael Pereira – drums (2016–present)
- Matt Prodanovich – guitar, backing vocals (2016–present)

=== Former members ===
- Mike Chinen – guitar, keyboards, backing vocals (2016–2018)
- Mark "Barry" Siford – bass (2016–2022)

== Touring ==
=== Headlining Tours ===
- Summer 2017 Tour (2017)
- Spring 2019 Tour (2019)
- Know You Better Tour (2019)
- Fall 2019 Tour (2019)
- Out of the Basement Tour (2022)
- The 1990something Tour (2022)
- UK Tour (2023)
- The Past Selves Tour (2023)
- The Past Selves Tour - Part 2 (2024)
- The Sunrise City Tour (2024)
- The Sunrise City Tour - Part 2 (2025)

=== Opening Act ===
- 2021 Summer Tour, The Strike (2021)
- 2022 Summer Tour, The Strike (2022)
- Let Yourself Free Tour, Fitz & The Tantrums (2023)
