= Andrew York (guitarist) =

American classical guitarist

- Born: 1958 (age 67–68); Atlanta, Georgia, U.S.
- Genres: Classical, jazz
- Occupations: Musician, composer
- Instrument: Classical guitar
- Labels: Majian Music, Telarc, Sony, Delos, GSP
- Formerly of: Los Angeles Guitar Quartet
- Website: www.andrewyork.net

Andrew York (born 1958) is an American Grammy Award winning classical guitarist and composer.

== Biography ==
York was born in 1958 in Atlanta, Georgia, United States, and grew up in Virginia. He received degrees from James Madison University in Virginia and the University of Southern California (USC). He studied in Spain, where he met classical guitarist John Williams. Williams has performed and recorded compositions by York. In 1989, York released his debut solo album, Perfect Sky (Timeless, 1989). He was a member of the Los Angeles Guitar Quartet from 1990 to 2006.

York is the only alumnus in USC's history to have received their Distinguished Alumni Award twice, in 1997 as a member of the Los Angeles Guitar Quartet and again in 2003 for his solo music career.

He played lute with the USC Early Music Ensemble. In addition to his solo career, recording and performing his own compositions, York's recent collaborations include projects with Andy Summers, W. A. Mathieu, Dai Kimura, and Mitsuko Kado. York's tour schedule has included concerts in thirty countries. York's compositions and arrangements for guitar have been performed and recorded by guitarists John Williams, Christopher Parkening, Karin Schaupp and Sharon Isbin.

== Accomplishments ==
York has over 50 works published for guitar: solo, duo, trio, quartet, and ensemble. He has appeared in three DVDs, has recorded or appeared as soloist on more than ten albums, and has published a three-volume work on jazz for classical guitarists. York has played on ten recordings with the Los Angeles Guitar Quartet, including the Grammy Award-winning Guitar Heroes (2004). He has released seven solo albums, 15 singles and five band tracks.

Andrew York is a member of the Triple Nine Society and his article Bowling Balls and Binary Switches was published in their journal Vidya in December 2016. He became a voting member at the Recording Academy in 2018.

Regarding Dénouement, Jim Ferguson stated that the five original suites that make up the recording "demonstrate [York's] exceptional compositional breadth, commanding instrumental abilities, and rich tone. Rife with folk, jazz, and ancient influences, the material ranges from challenging to simple yet highly musical."

== Discography ==
=== Solo ===
- Perfect Sky (1986)
- Dénouement (1994)
- Into Dark (1997)
- Hauser Sessions (2007)
- Yamour (2012)
- Home (2018)
- The Equations of Beauty (2018)

=== Singles ===
- "Silent Night" (2019)
- "Undercurrents" (2020)
- "Deepening" (2020)
- "Dancing with Maya" (2020)
- "Not Alone" (2020)
- "Hall of Forgotten Rooms" (2020)
- "Night on Maui" (2020)
- "Numen" (2020)
- "Lumen" (2020)
- "Menhir" (2020)
- "Numina" (2020)
- "The World Has Changed" (2020)
- "Annie's Song" (2020)
- "Second Glass" (2020)
- "The Dancer" (2021)

=== Band tracks ===
- "Lotus Eaters" (2018)
- "Stratojee" (2018)
- "Land Below Waves" (2018)
- "DissFunkShun" (2019)
- "Pay the Piper" (2019)

=== With LAGQ ===
- Guitar Recital
- Dances from Renaissance to Nutcracker
- Evening in Granada
- Labyrinth
- For Thy Pleasure
- The Best of LAGQ
- L.A.G.Q.
- Air and Ground
- LAGQ: Latin
- Guitar Heroes
- Spin

=== Collaborations and compilations ===
- Windham Hill Records: Guitar Sampler (1988)
- Legends of Guitar (Rhino, 1991)
- An Evening with International Guitar Night with Guinga, Brian Gore, and Pierre Bensusan (Favored Nations, 2004)
- Centerpeace (2010) with guitarist Andy Summers, and pianists Mitsuko Kado and Allaudin Mathieu
- "In Dialogue" by Ulli Boegershausen (2019)
- "Push It" by Ulli Boegershausen (2020)

== DVDs ==
- Contemporary Classic Guitar
- LAGQ Live!
- Primal Twang

== Books ==
- Jazz for Classical Cats I: Harmony (method book w/CD)
- Jazz for Classical Cats II: Chord/Melody (method book w/CD)
- Jazz for Classical Cats III: Improvisation (method book w/CD)
