= Molloy University =

Catholic university in Rockville Centre, New York, US

- Former names: Molloy Catholic College (1955–1971); Molloy College (1971–2022)
- Motto: Veritas
- Type: Private university
- Established: 1955; 71 years ago
- Religious affiliation: Roman Catholic (Dominican)
- Endowment: $74.4 million (2025)
- President: James Lentini
- Students: 5,005 (fall 2024)
- Undergraduates: 3,240 (fall 2024)
- Postgraduates: 1,765 (fall 2024)
- Location: Rockville Centre, New York, United States; 40°41′9″N 73°37′35″W
- Campus: Rockville Centre, Suffolk Center, Manhattan Center (50 Broadway)
- Athletics: NCAA Division II
- Colors: Rose and Gold
- Nickname: Lions
- Mascot: Victor E. Lion
- Website: molloy.edu

Molloy University is a private Catholic university in Rockville Centre, New York, United States. Initially founded as a school for women, it is now co-educational. It provides more than 69 undergraduate, graduate, and doctoral degree programs for over 5,000 students.

== History ==
In 1955, the Dominican Sisters of Amityville founded Molloy Catholic College for Women on 25 acres in Rockville Centre, Long Island, which was purchased by the Sisters of St. Dominic. When the college opened, Anselma Ruth was its first president and the school offered two degrees, education and nursing. A year after it opened, the first institutional building, named Quealy Hall, opened. Soon after, Mother Bernadette de Lourdes, O.P., was appointed as the second president, followed by the opening of Kellenberg Hall. In 1959, the first commencement ceremony took place, celebrating the first graduating class.

In 1971, the decision was made to drop "for Women" from the school name. In 1972, Molloy began accepting men into the nursing program and in 1982 became fully coeducational.

The college opened Fitzgerald Hall, the first of three student residence halls, as well as Public Square and Madison Theatre in 2011. In 2013, the Molloy Clinic opened in the Village of Rockville Centre. In 2013, the school's Maria Regina Hall underwent renovation and was converted into a residence hall that opened in the fall of 2014. Before the renovation, the hall was used by the nursing faculty and the college's Public Safety offices. The top floor of the hall served as a convent for the Sisters of Saint Dominic. The few sisters who still lived in the convent moved back to the Dominican priory in Amityville before the renovation.

In 2019, the college's residence quad, McGovern Plaza, was dedicated, and the Drew and Karen Bogner Hall, a new dorm, opened. The following year, Molloy announced James Lentini as president.

In March 2022, the New York State Board of Regents approved the change from Molloy College to Molloy University. The name change was effective June 1, 2022, and the university adopted a new logo.

== Academics ==
Molloy University employs 191 full-time faculty, with 87% holding terminal degrees in their field. Molloy's student-faculty ratio is 10 to 1. The university accepts around 77% of its applicants. The four schools are School of Arts and Sciences, School of Business, School of Education and Human Services, and the Barbara H. Hagan School of Nursing and Health Sciences.

The class of 2022 consisted of 908 undergraduates, 409 masters graduates, and 28 doctoral degree recipients.

In 2020, the three majors with the highest number of graduates were:

- Associate degree: Respiratory Care Therapist, Cardiovascular Technologist, and Liberal Arts and Sciences
- Bachelor's degree: Registered Nursing, General Business Administration and Management, and Accounting
- Master's degree: Family Practice Nurse, Speech-Language Pathology, Education of Individuals in Elementary Special Education Programs
- Doctoral degree: General Educational Leadership and Administration, Family Practice Nurse, Other Registered Nursing, Nursing Administration, Nursing Research, and Clinical Nursing

=== First-year requirement ===
All of Molloy's first-year students belong to a freshman learning community, which discusses topics such as "Law and Order" and "Keeping America Healthy". There is a separate, optional group for first-year students that has been dubbed "Molloy Well". These communities attempt to teach "physical, emotional, and spiritual well-being" and "provide support in the transition from high school to college".

=== School of Arts and Sciences ===
The School of Arts and Sciences offers majors in the arts, humanities, sciences, and social sciences. The school offers 17 undergraduate degree majors and two graduate programs, including the Molloy/CAP21 BFA in theatre arts.

=== School of Business ===
The School of Business at Molloy University is accredited by the International Accreditation Council for Business Education and offers undergraduate degrees and graduate degrees, including the MBA, as well as dual degrees.

=== School of Education and Human Services ===
The School of Education and Human Services offers undergraduate and graduate degrees, including bachelor's, master's, and doctoral programs in Education, Clinical Mental Health Counseling, and Social Work. The university's Doctor of Education program in Educational Leadership for Diverse Learning Communities is part of the Carnegie Project on the Education Doctorate. The Education undergraduate and graduate programs are accredited by the Council for the Accreditation of Educator Preparation. In January 2019, the university opened its Mental Health and Wellness Center. It was founded by Laura Kestemberg, who has served as an associate professor, chair, associate dean, and director of the Master of Science program and Department of Clinical Mental Health Counseling.

=== Barbara H. Hagan School of Nursing and Health Sciences ===
The Barbara H. Hagan School of Nursing and Health Sciences offers undergraduate and graduate degrees in nursing, allied health sciences, and communication sciences and disorders. Almost half of Molloy's undergraduates (based on pre-2023 data) major in nursing. The nursing program is built around a humanistic approach. The university's master of science program in clinical mental health counseling is accredited by the Council for Accreditation of Counseling and Related Educational Programs.

=== Mental Health and Wellness Center ===
MHWC offers individual therapy, group, and couples therapy, and support-group therapy. It also gives graduate students the opportunity for hands-on clinical training. In 2022, the university opened a nursing training school in Amityville to provide training for undergraduate and graduate students.

=== Theatre Program and Molloy-CAP21 ===
In 2004, the college announced plans for the Public Square Building. It is now home to the Madison Theatre at Molloy College, a 550-seat theater and professional performance space. Madison Theatre's artistic director is Angelo Fraboni, a Broadway performer who has produced and managed a range of off-Broadway productions and tours.

In 2014, CAP21 joined forces with Molloy University. The two institutions developed a four-year BFA theatre arts degree program to help "sustain the theatre for the next generation of artists." Students take classes at Molloy and at the conservatory, with many members of the faculty working in the theater industry, and have the opportunity to perform with Broadway professionals. The musical theater training focuses on singing, voice, dance, and music theory. All seniors complete a Senior Showcase.

In 2018, Molloy opened the Manhattan Center in downtown Manhattan to serve as the new home for the Molloy/Cap21 program. It occupies the entire fourth floor of a historic building at 50 Broadway.

=== Irish Studies Institute ===
The Irish Studies Institute (ISI) was founded in 2008 and offers Irish and Celtic Studies programs. This includes Irish language instruction and courses focused on Irish culture. ISI also offers a certificate program in Irish Language and Gaelic Culture for adults and children.

=== Center for Environmental Research and Coastal Oceans Monitoring ===
The Center for Environmental Research and Coastal Oceans Monitoring is a marine science laboratory that monitors marine life and water pollution, and is the only horseshoe crab breeding laboratory in the U.S. In 2013, it was incorporated with the research field station for Molloy's BS degree program in Earth and Environmental Sciences.

=== Ranking ===
In 2023, some of the university's rankings included: Number 50 in Regional Universities North, number 45 in Best Value Schools, and number 263 in nursing. In 2021, Molloy was named the seventh-safest school in the nation. It was the only college within the New York City region to break the top 10.

== Student life ==
Molloy has three residence halls that house nearly 350 students (about 9% of undergrads), Maria Regina, Fitzgerald, and Bogner Hall. Bogner Hall has the following amenities, which are available to all students who live on campus - study lounges, private music practice rooms, a social lounge, and a kitchen.

Dorms are co-educational, but the halls and wings are separated by gender. Students living on campus have a choice of three different meal plans, and the school provides daily shuttle service for dining, shopping, or the train.

== Student activities ==
More than 50 student organizations are active on campus.

== Student services ==
Molloy's student services include nonremedial tutoring, a women's center, placement services, international student advisors, career services, health service, personal/psychological counseling, and health insurance.

=== Public Square ===
Molloy's Public Square is a 24-hour campus center that opened in 2011. It includes a cafe, lounges, study rooms, student club space, a bookstore, an art gallery, rehearsal and office spaces for the music department, and the Madison Theatre, a 550-seat theater.

== Research and partnerships ==
=== Energeia Partnership ===
This partnership is a forum for Long Island-based ethicists working in the public, private, and charity sectors. Participants search for solutions to the area's problems, while studying a two-year curriculum that focuses on topics that include education, institutional racism, poverty and the working poor, criminal justice, government and taxation, transportation, land use, energy, health care, resiliency, and media and social networking. In 2009, Molloy started Energeia for Teens to help develop leadership skills and promote character development in Long Island high school students. Molloy's 20-year sponsorship of the program ended in December 2024 on amicable terms with praise for the program's contributions to Long Island.

=== Catholic Health Services ===
Molloy and Catholic Health Services work together to improve healthcare in Long Island and provide training opportunities for faculty, students, and others in the community.

== Community work ==
Molloy follows the Four Pillars of Dominican Life: Study, Spirituality, Community, and Service. These pillars are part of the Dominican tradition and help guide Molloy's campus and community activities and programs.

=== Community Care Mobile Clinic ===
This clinic provides free services to low-resourced communities in Long Island. Faculty and students who volunteer with the clinic go into neighborhoods to provide free care such as heart health screenings; assessments for blood pressure, cholesterol, hearing, vision, and stress; mental health support; voter registration; and music therapy. The clinic is supported in part by a grant from the Mother Cabrini Health Foundation.

=== Edith Richner Palliative Care Conference ===
In 2008, Molloy founded its Palliative Care Conference, which focuses on providing participants with tools to bring "professional, competent, and compassionate care" to patients and their families. The conference was on hold for two years during the coronavirus pandemic, and then resumed in 2022. That year, the conference was renamed the Edith Richner Palliative Care Conference, in memory of the cofounder of the Herald Community Newspapers and late mother of Stuart and Cliff Richner.

=== Rebecca Center for Music Therapy ===
The Rebecca Center was acquired by Molloy in 2008. At the center, music therapists provide treatment for patients who can be anywhere from two years old to adults. Music therapy observational students can help as part of their studies and can be included in research projects.

The center partners with local school districts to provide services to students with autism, and works with students transitioning out of high school through its Campus Connections program.

=== Service projects ===
Molloy's Campus Ministries office provides many service projects, locally, nationally, and internationally.

A few examples include:

- Helped run a children's camp in El Salvador
- Mission trips to El Salvador
- Food drives
- Worked with Bethany House, which helps women and children experiencing homelessness
- The annual Boxtown event, where Molloy students camp out in boxes on campus to simulate a night of homelessness and raise money for Bethany House
- Midnight Run, where students deliver food and clothes to homeless in Manhattan
- Sponsoring families during the Christmas season
- Appalachia Project, where students work at the Big Laurel Learning Center in West Virginia and run a camp for children
- Urban Challenge, where students spend a few days at the Romero Center serving the people of Camden, New Jersey

=== Sustainability Institute ===
The Sustainability Institute provides community classes and research on sustainability education and policy analysis. It was opened in 2009 with a mission to “integrate “green” concepts into the academic life of Molloy College and catalyze Long Island into a national leader in sustainable solutions.”

=== Workforce Development Program ===
This program provides ongoing training for private industry employees. In June 2022, S. Zaki Hossain, the president of Pintail Coffee and a member of the Board of Trustees of Molloy, gave the university a $2 million gift to support the program.

== Athletics ==
Molloy athletic teams are the Lions. The school's colors are maroon and white. The college is a member of the Division II level of the National Collegiate Athletic Association (NCAA), primarily competing in the East Coast Conference.

Molloy has 19 intercollegiate varsity sports: men's sports include baseball, basketball, cross country, lacrosse, soccer, track & field (indoor and outdoor); while women's sports include basketball, bowling, cross country, field hockey, lacrosse, rugby, soccer, softball, tennis, track & field (indoor and outdoor) and volleyball. Sprint football, a weight-restricted variant of American football governed outside the NCAA structure, will become the eighth men's sport and 20th overall in the 2024–25 school year. That team will compete in the Collegiate Sprint Football League.

The Molloy College softball team made it to the NCAA Division II World Series in 2013.

== Notable alumni ==
- Shea Spitzbarth - professional baseball player
- Jaylen Morris - professional basketball player
