= Anthony Suter =

American composer and music educator

Anthony Suter is an American composer and music educator. Dr. Suter has a deep interest in mentoring younger musicians and is a vocal advocate for public school music programs, often serving as a guest conductor and clinician for K-12 music programs. He resides in Redlands, California, just outside Los Angeles.

Dr. Suter's music has been heard in nearly every major U.S. city, as well as a growing list of international venues. Dr. Suter joined the University of Redlands faculty in the Fall of 2008, where he teaches composition and music theory. He earned his B.M. in Music Theory and Composition from the University of Southern California, his M.M. in Music Composition from the University of Michigan, and his D.M.A. from the University of Texas at Austin.

His works include three chamber operas, chamber and orchestral music, and several works for wind ensemble. Upcoming projects include Sex Sting, a collaborative electro-acoustic opera with playwright Doris Baizley and the electronic music duo MLuM (Marco Schindelmann and Michael Raco-Rands), as well as a new choral work for the University of Redlands Madrigals group (Nicholle Andrews, director). Recent projects have included works for the Virginia Arts Festival Duffy Opera Workshop, the NYC-based NOW Ensemble, and percussionist Stephen A. Martin.

In 2009, Centaur Records released the CD Hymns to Forgotten Moons: The Music of Arnold Schoenberg and Anthony Suter, which features two works by Suter.

== Awards ==
Dr. Suter's music has received awards from the National Opera Association, the College Band Director's National Association, ASCAP, Associazione Culturale Musicale "Euritmia", the British and International Bass Forum, Concorso 2 Agosto, and the Texas String Project. His music is published by Daehn Publications and Edizione Musicale “Wicky” (Milan).
