= Los Angeles Guitar Quartet =

American classical guitar ensemble

- Origin: Los Angeles, California
- Genre: Classical
- Years active: 1980–present
- Labels: GHA Records, Delos, Sony, Telarc
- Members: John Dearman; William Kanengiser; Matthew Greif; Douglas Lora
- Past members: Andrew York; Scott Tennant; Anisa Angarola
- Website: www.lagq.com

The Los Angeles Guitar Quartet (LAGQ) is an American classical guitar ensemble formed in 1980. It consists of John Dearman, William Kanengiser, Douglas Lora (who replaced Scott Tennant at the end of 2023) and Matthew Greif (who replaced Andrew York at the end of 2006). They play nylon string guitars to imitate a variety of instruments and effects.

They have played in many styles: baroque, bluegrass, flamenco, rock, and new-age. The quartet received a Grammy Award for Best Classical Crossover Album in 2005 for Guitar Heroes.

== History ==
Anisa Angarola, William Kanengiser, John Dearman, and Scott Tennant met as students at the University of Southern California. They assembled the quartet in 1980 under the guidance of guitarist Pepe Romero, who taught at the school.

In 1990 Andrew York replaced Angarola. In 2006 York was replaced by Matthew Greif. In 2023 Douglas Lora replaced Scott Tennant.

The group's first album included works by Holst, Rossini, and Stravinsky. Although primarily a classical ensemble, the group dabbles in other genres. The album Guitar Heroes included music by Chet Atkins, Sergio Assad, Steve Howe, and Pat Metheny. The group has played classical music from the Baroque, Classical, Renaissance, Romantic, and modern periods.

The group founded their own label, LAGQ Records, in 2015. The label's first release was the album New Renaissance. The second release was Opalescent, in 2022.

The group figured prominently on Pat Metheny's album 2021 album, Road to the Sun.

Scott Tennant has recorded albums of the guitar works of Joaquín Rodrigo and the Celtic music of England, Ireland and Scotland. He has taught at the University of Southern California and has written method books for classical guitar. John Dearman plays a custom guitar with an added bass string and extended fretboard. He has taught at El Camino College and the University of California, Santa Barbara.

William Kanengiser has arranged works for the quartet, including the Hungarian Rhapsody No. 2 by Franz Liszt and the gamelan piece "Gongan". He has taught at the University of Southern California and is a graduate of the USC Thornton School of Music.

== Awards and honors ==
- Latin, Grammy Award nomination, 2003
- Guitar Heroes, Grammy Award, Best Classical Crossover, 2005
- Artistic Achievement Award, Guitar Foundation of America 2021

== Discography ==
- Praetorius, Bach, Stravinsky, Debussy, Falla (Orpharion, 1983)
- El Amor Brujo (GHA, 1990)
- L.A. Guitar Quartet Recital (GHA, 1991)
- Dances from Renaissance to Nutcracker (Delos, 1992)
- Evening in Granada (Delos, 1993)
- Manuel de Falla: El Amor Brujo (GHA, 1994)
- Labyrinth (Delos, 1995)
- For Thy Pleasure (Delos, 1996)
- L.A.G.Q. (Sony, 1998)
- Air and Ground (Sony, 2000)
- LAGQ Latin (Telarc, 2002)
- Guitar Heroes (Telarc, 2004)
- Spin (Telarc, 2006)
- Brazil (Telarc, 2007)
- Interchange: Concertos by Rodrigo and Assad (Telarc, 2010)
- Boccherini: Guitar Quintets (Red Bus, 2011)
- New Renaissance (LAGQ Records, 2015)
- Opalescent (LAGQ Records, 2022)

== Articles ==
- Interview (1987), by Paul Magnussen
