= William Kanengiser =

- Born: July 22, 1959 (age 66); Orange, New Jersey, U.s.
- Genres: Classical, jazz
- Occupation: Musician
- Instrument: Guitar
- Years active: 1980–present
- Labels: GSP
- Website: www.kanengiser.com

William Kanengiser /ˈkænənˌɡaɪzər/ (born July 22, 1959) is a classical guitarist. He is one of the founding members of the Los Angeles Guitar Quartet (LAGQ).

Kanengiser was born in Orange, New Jersey. He holds a Bachelor of Music and Master of Music from the Thornton School of Music at the University of Southern California, where he also serves as a faculty member.

Kanengiser has won Grammy Awards with the Los Angeles Guitar Quartet, which received the award for best classical crossover album at the 47th Grammy Awards for Guitar Heroes; he has also won for his contribution to Atlanta Symphony Orchestra's performance of Golijov's Ainadamar: Fountain Of Tears, which won the Grammy Award for Best Opera Recording in 2007.

== Notes ==
- Gregg Wager, "Music Reviews: William Kanengiser in Guitar Recital at Ambassador", in: Los Angeles Times, March 14, 1990
