= Françoise Choveaux =

French composer and pianist

Françoise Choveaux (born in 1953) is a French composer and pianist.

== Education ==
Choveaux was trained at the Conservatoire de Lille, then at the École normale de musique de Paris, she continued her apprenticeship in the United States at the Peabody Institute of Baltimore, then at the Juilliard School of New York.

== Career ==
Choveaux has recorded the complete piano work of Darius Milhaud at the suggestion of Madeleine Milhaud, the composer's wife.

With close to 300 works to Choveaux's credit, she is part of this musical tradition, anchored until the 19th century, of the virtuoso instrumentalist and composer.

== Selected discography ==
- Darius Milhaud, complete piano work
- Françoise Choveaux, quintet with piano, quartets nº 1, 2, 3, 4 with the Vilnius String quartet and F. Choveaux as the pianist
