= Bryan Johanson =

American classical guitarist and composer

Bryan Johanson (born 1951) is an American classical guitarist and composer.

Johanson was born in Yakima, Washington.

Johanson has performed, recorded and published works internationally. Johanson's works have won major awards from the St. Paul Chamber Orchestra, Aspen Music Festival and School, The John F. Kennedy Center for the Performing Arts, UCLA and The Esztergom International Guitar Festival. Johanson studied composition with Charles Jones and Pulitzer Prize-winning composer William Bolcom. Johanson's compositions feature nine symphonies, concertos for violin, cello and piano, numerous chamber works, song cycles and choral works, as well as compositions for solo instruments including the classical guitar.

Johanson directed the guitar studies program at Portland State University from 1977 to 2015. During that time, he managed a successful concert series and later the Portland International Guitar Festival and Competition, a festival that earned worldwide recognition and attracted some of the finest players.

Johanson studied with the likes of Christopher Parkening, Alirio Diaz, and Michael Lorimer. He has performed with orchestras, chamber music groups, choirs, and in solo recitals throughout the United States and Canada.

In 2010, Johanson became a member of the Oregon Guitar Quartet, a group for which he has created numerous original compositions and arrangements.

Johanson currently lives in Portland, Oregon with his wife and thousands of honeybees.

== Published works ==
- SONATA No. 4 for guitar solo. Les Editions D’OZ, Inc. Quebec City, Quebec, Canada. 2017
- SONATINA-CAHIER for guitar solo. Les Editions D’OZ, Inc. Quebec City, Quebec, Canada. 2017
- A NIGHT AT THE THIRSTY EAR for guitar quartet. Les Editions D’OZ, Inc. Quebec City, Quebec, Canada. 2017
- PAINTED MUSIC for flute and guitar. Les Editions D’OZ, Inc. Quebec City, Quebec, Canada. 2017
- A GROOVE OF GUITARS for guitar quartet and orchestra. Les Editions D’OZ, Inc. Quebec City, Quebec, Canada. 2017
- LOS PEREGRINOS DEL CAMINO for guitar solo. Les Editions D’OZ, Inc. Quebec City, Quebec, Canada. 2016
- PICCOLLA SUITE ITALIANA for guitar solo. Les Editions D’OZ, Inc. Quebec City, Quebec, Canada. 2016
- ELEGY for guitar solo. Les Editions D’OZ, Inc. Quebec City, Quebec, Canada. 2016
- SONATA No. 3 for guitar solo. Les Editions D’OZ, Inc. Quebec City, Quebec, Canada. 2016
- SONATA No. 2 for guitar solo. Les Editions D’OZ, Inc. Quebec City, Quebec, Canada. 2016
- SONATA for guitar solo. Les Editions D’Oz, Inc. Quebec City, Quebec, Canada. 2013
- THE AUTUMN WIND - traditional Japanese arranged for guitar quartet. Editions D’Oz, Inc. Quebec City, Quebec, Canada. 2014
- JAVA BY STARLIGHT – traditional from Java arranged for guitar quartet. Editions D’Oz, Inc. Quebec City, Quebec, Canada. 2014
- MORNING DEW – traditional from China arranged for guitar quartet. Editions D’Oz, Inc. Quebec City, Quebec, Canada. 2014
- KALINKA – traditional from Russia arranged for guitar quartet. Editions D’Oz, Inc. Quebec City, Quebec, Canada. 2014
- OLIVES, LEMONS AND LAMB – traditional from Greece arranged for guitar quartet. Editions D’Oz, Inc. Quebec City, Quebec, Canada. 2014
- BERCEUSE – traditional from Catalonia arranged for guitar quartet. Editions D’Oz, Inc. Quebec City, Quebec, Canada. 2014
- JAMMUS AFRIKANUS – traditional from Zimbabwe arranged for guitar quartet. Editions D’Oz, Inc. Quebec City, Quebec, Canada. 2014
- BIALANDO EL GATO – traditional from Argentina arranged for guitar quartet. Editions D’Oz, Inc. Quebec City, Quebec, Canada. 2014
- LA SANDUNGA – traditional from Mexico arranged for guitar quartet. Editions D’Oz, Inc. Quebec City, Quebec, Canada. 2014
- A DOG FROM EVERY TOWN for guitar solo. Les Editions D’Oz, Inc. Quebec City, Quebec, Canada. 2013
- OPEN UP YOUR EARS for guitar solo. Les Editions D’Oz, Inc. Quebec City, Quebec, Canada. 2013
- I DREAMED ABOUT YOU LAST NIGHT for guitar solo. Les Editions D’Oz, Inc. Quebec City, Quebec, Canada. 2013
- BOPPIN’ for guitar solo. Les Editions D’Oz, Inc. Quebec City, Quebec, Canada. 2013
- THE PHILOSOPHER AND THE FLY for guitar solo. Les Editions D’Oz, Inc. Quebec City, Quebec, Canada. 2013
- MAGIC SERENADE for guitar solo. Les Editions D’Oz, Inc. Quebec City, Quebec, Canada. 2013
- ON ALL FOUR for guitar quartet. Les Editions D’Oz, Inc. Quebec City, Quebec, Canada. 2013
- 24 PRELUDES for guitar solo. Les Editions D’Oz, Inc. Quebec City, Quebec, Canada. 2012
- BRETHEN, WE HAVE MET arranged from traditional material for guitar quartet. Les Editions D’Oz, Inc. Quebec City, Quebec, Canada. 2011.
- WHISTLING MOLLY arranged from traditional material for guitar quartet. Editions D’Oz, Inc. Quebec City, Quebec, Canada. 2011.
- BLACK IS THE COLOR arranged from traditional material for guitar quartet. Editions D’Oz, Inc. Quebec City, Quebec, Canada. 2011.
- HARD TIMES by Stephen Foster, arranged for guitar quartet. Editions D’Oz, Inc. Quebec City, Quebec, Canada. 2011
- THE SAINT JAMES INFIRMARY arranged from traditional material for guitar quartet. Editions D’Oz, Inc. Quebec City, Quebec, Canada. 2011
- RYE WHISKEY arranged from traditional material for guitar quartet. Editions D’Oz, Inc. Quebec City, Quebec, Canada. 2011.
- SHENANDOAH arranged from traditional material for guitar quartet. Editions D’Oz, Inc. Quebec, City, Quebec, Canada. 2011
- PICK A BALE OF COTTON arranged from traditional material for guitar quartet. Editions D’Oz, Inc. Quebec City, Quebec, Canada. 2011.
- LUX AETERNA for chorus and solo cello. Earthsongs Choral Editions. Corvallis, Oregon. 2010.
- AVE MARIA for chorus and piano. Earthsongs Choral Editions. Corvallis, Oregon. 2010.
- LIQUID MUSIC for chorus and harp. Earthsongs Choral Editions. Corvallis, Oregon. 2010
- THE MISTRESS AND THE BEE for chorus and piano. Earthsongs Choral Editions. Corvallis, Oregon. 2010
- O MAGNUMUM MYSTERIUM for chorus. Earthsongs Choral Editions. Corvallis, Oregon. 2010
- PSALLITE for chorus and piano. Earthsongs Choral Editions. Corvallis, Oregon. 2010
- PLUCK, STRUM AND HAMMER for guitar quartet. Editions D’Oz, Inc. Quebec City, Quebec, Canada. 2010
- SINFONIA by George Wagenseil, transcribed for guitar quartet. Editions D’Oz, Inc. Quebec City, Quebec, Canada. 2010
- DIVERTIMENTO IN Bb by Franz Joseph Haydn, transcribed for guitar quartet. Editions D’Oz, Inc. Quebec City, Quebec, Canada. 2010
- CONCERTO GROSSO III, OP. 6 by George Frederic Handel, transcribed for guitar quartet. Editions D’Oz, Inc. Quebec City, Quebec, Canada. 2010
- SINFONIA VENEZIANA by Antonio Salieri, transcribed for guitar quartet. Editions D’Oz, Inc. Quebec City, Quebec, Canada. 2010
- L’ENCOURAGEMENT, OP. 34 by Fernando Sor, transcribed for guitar duo with guitar ensemble. Editions D’Oz, Inc. Quebec City, Quebec, Canada. 2010
- SYMPHONY V by William Boyce, transcribed for guitar quartet. Editions D’Oz, Inc. Quebec City, Quebec, Canada. 2010
- TWO SONATAS by Domenico Scarlatti, transcribed for guitar quartet. Editions D’Oz, Inc. Quebec City, Quebec, Canada. 2010
- CLARINET CONCERTO by Johann Molter, transcribed for clarinet and guitar quartet. Editions D’Oz, Inc. Quebec City, Quebec, Canada. 2010
- SINFONIA, K. 76 by Wolfgang Amadeus Mozart, transcribed for guitar quartet. Editions D’Oz, Inc. Quebec City, Quebec, Canada. 2010
- SONATA IV, Op. 1 by Antonio Vivaldi, transcribed for guitar quartet. Editions D’Oz, Inc. Quebec City, Quebec, Canada. 2010
- TANGO, Op. 165 by Isaac Albeniz transcribed for guitar quartet. Editions D’Oz, Inc. Quebec City, Quebec, Canada. 2010
- LA FOLIA FOLIO for guitar solo. Editions D’Oz, Inc., Quebec City, Quebec, Canada 2008
- CIACCONA for guitar solo. Guitar Solo Publication (GSP) Inc., San Francisco, California. 2007
- VARIATIONS ON A FINNISH FOLK SONG for guitar solo in "Mel Bay Presents - The Contemporary Guitar: An Anthology of New Music, edited by Stanley Yates". Mel Bay Publications, Inc. Pacific Missouri. 2001.
- O MAGNUM MYSTERIUM for chorus. Thomas House Publications. 1998. Winner of the 1997 Roger Wagner Center for Choral Studies Contemporary Choral Composition Competition.
- AND THE DISH RAN AWAY WITH THE SPOON for solo guitar in "New Classical Guitar Music Volume 1: The Verdery Guitar Series". Frederick Harris Music * Publishers. Toronto, Ontario, Canada. 1996.
- BRING A TORCH, JEANNETTE ISABELLA arranged for cello and guitar from the traditional Christmas Carol. Earthsongs Music Publishers, Corvallis, Oregon. 1991.
- TWO CATS FUGUE for guitar and harpsichord. Columbia Music Company, Chapel Hill, North Carolina, USA. 1991.
- TOCCATA FESTIVA, Op. 46 for Guitar and Orchestra. Edizioni Musicali BERBEN, Ancona, Italia. 1990.
- MORTUA DOLCE CANO for solo Guitar. Columbia Music Company, Chapel Hill, North Carolina, USA. 1990.
- FRESCO I, Op. 33 for solo Guitar. Columbia Music Company, Chapel Hill, North Carolina, USA. 1990.
- FRESCO II, Op. 33 for two Guitars. Columbia Music Company, Chapel Hill, North Carolina, USA 1990.
- TIENTO VI, Op. 25 for two Guitars. Columbia Music Company, Chapel Hill, North Carolina, USA. 1990.
- SIMPLE SUITE, Op. 13 for solo Guitar. Columbia Music Company, Chapel Hill, North Carolina, USA. 1990.
- LABYRINTH, op. 30 for solo Guitar. Edizioni Musicali BERBEN, Ancona, Italia. 1985.

== Commissioned works ==
- THE BOOTLEGGER’S TALE for guitar solo. Commissioned by William Kanengiser with funding provided by the Augustine Foundation. 2018.
- PAINTED MUSIC for flute and guitar. Commissioned by Jeff LaQuatre and Michelle Stanley with funding from Metropolitan State University, Colorado for their 2017-18 concert season.
- FIVE WAYS IN, ONE WAY OUT for clarinet in A and guitar quartet. Commissioned by Chamber Music Northwest for their 2016 Summer Music Festival.
- ESSERCIZI for piano solo. Commissioned by Portland Piano International, with the generous support of a Creative Heights Grant from the Fred W. Fields Fund of The Oregon Community Foundation. 2015
- SONATA for guitar solo. Commissioned by Michael LeFevre with funds from an anonymous donor.
- SONATE DE CHAMBRE for cello and piano. Commissioned by Cheryl Chevis.
- CATCH AND RELEASE for clarinet, alto sax, trumpet, trombone, electric guitar and piano. Commissioned by Festival "Agosto 2", Italy.
- FORE! for guitar quartet. Commissioned by the Oregon Guitar Quartet with funds provide by ArtBeat.
- FRESCO for organ and orchestra. Commissioned by the city of Bologna, Italy for their annual summer music festival "Agosto 2". 2008
- AS EVENING BECOMES MORNING for guitar solo. Commissioned by guitarist Louis O’Neill. 2008
- IF E WAS G for guitar solo. Commissioned by guitarist Louis O’Neill. 2008
- QUICK AS A WINK for orchestra. Commissioned by the Orchestra Filarmonica di Torino, Italia 2007
- DRINKING BREAKFAST FROM A JELLY JAR for guitar quartet. Commission by the Alexandria Guitar Quartet. 2007
- SONATA DA CAMERA for clarinet and guitar. Commissioned by Roger Cole and James Reid. 2007
- THE UNDERDOG for guitar and orchestra. Commissioned by Orchestra Seattle and the Seattle Classic Guitar Society. 2006
- RECESSIONAL for trumpet and organ. Commissioned by Robert Sandstrom and Lisa Day. 2006. A GRIMM LITTLE SUITE for 11-String guitar. Commissioned by Terry Schumaker. 2006
- THE MISTRESS AND THE BEE for choir and piano. Commissioned by the Southern Oregon Repertoire Singers. 2005
- BOPPIN’ for guitar solo. Commissioned by Travis Johnson. 2005
- CATWALK for guitar quartet. Commissioned by the Los Angeles Guitar Quartet. 2005
- LUX AETERNA for chorus and cello solo. Commissioned by The Portland Symphonic Choir with funding provide by the Argosy Foundation. 2005
- NOTES ON A VAULTED SKY for string quartet. Commissioned by Third Angle New Music Ensemble. 2003
- LET’S BE FRANK for guitar quartet. Commissioned by the Los Angeles Guitar Quartet. 2003 PLUCK, STRUM AND HAMMER for guitar quartet. Commissioned by the Los Angeles Guitar Quartet. 2003
- NO YOICKING, GABBLING, QUOTHING for penta armonica and guitar quartet. Commissioned by the New York Guitar Quartet. 2003
- LOS ABEJARUCOS for string quartet. Commissioned by Third Angle New Music Ensemble. 2003
- FRESCOES for oboe and trumpet. Commissioned by Robert and Lauren Murray. 2003 CONCERTO GROSSO for three guitars and string orchestra. Commissioned by the Alexandria Guitar Trio. 2002
- THE BANANA DANCE for two guitars and orchestra. Commissioned by Michael Kudirka and Eric Benzant-Feldra. 2002
- THE RED MARE SUITE for clarinet, violin, cello, percussion and balalaika. Commissioned by Third Angle New Music Ensemble. 2002
- THE RED MARE for clarinet, violin, cello, percussion, balalaika and guitar. Commissioned by Tears of Joy Puppet Theater Ensemble. 2002
- 13 WAYS OF LOOKING AT 12 STRINGS for two guitars. Commissioned by Michael Kudirka and Eric Benzant-Feldra. 2002
- CIACCONA for lute or guitar. Commissioned by Martha Masters. 2002
- ORPHEUS WITH HIS LUTE for voice, lute, baroque flute and viol. Commissioned by Jacob Herringman and Catherine King. 2002
- SAKURA SAFARI for guitar trio. Commissioned by the Alexandria Guitar Trio. 2001
- PARTITA for guitar solo. Commissioned by The Rosewood Guitar for Michael Partington. 2000
- QUATRO SINKO for guitar quartet. Commissioned by the Los Angeles Guitar Quartet. 2000 THINK FAST for guitar solo. Commissioned by David Starobin. 2000
- DRAGON DANCE for guitar trio. Commissioned by the Virginia Guitar Trio. 2000
- PSALLITE for chorus and piano. Commissioned by the Portland Symphonic Choir. 2000.
- BAGATELLES for solo cello. Commissioned for cellist Hamilton Cheifetz by friends of Mary Winch. 1999
- IN THE DEEP WOOD REFLECTED for viola and chamber ensemble. Commissioned by the Third Angle New Music Ensemble, Jeffrey Peyton, artistic director. Portland, Oregon. 1997
- STILL LIFE WITH 10 STRINGS for violin and guitar. Commissioned by Kevin Gary. Denver, Colorado. 1996
- TWANG for guitar quartet. Commissioned by the Alexandria Guitar Quartet. Fairfax, Virginia. 1996
- OPEN UP YOUR EARS for guitar. Commissioned by David Starobin. New York, New York. 1996
- IN THE DEEP WOOD REFLECTED for viola and orchestra. Commissioned by Anna Schaum. Portland, Oregon. 1996
- SONATA for solo cello. Commissioned by Cheryl Chevis for Hamilton Cheifetz. Portland, Oregon. 1996
- AVE MARIA for chorus and piano. Commissioned by the Portland Symphonic Choir. Portland, Oregon. 1995
- IN STILLNESS IN MOTION for violin, cello and piano. Commissioned by the Florestan Trio. Portland, Oregon. 1995
- LOS ABEJARUCOS for guitar quartet. Commissioned by the Alexandria Guitar Quartet. Fairfax, Virginia. 1995
- PICCOLO SERENATA for viola and guitar. Commissioned by the Alma Duo, San Francisco, California. 1995
- Composed and performed music for PROMOTORAS, one of the shows that was part of the National Public Radio series
- LEGACIES: TALES FROM AMERICA. 1994
- STRUM UND JAM for flute, clarinet, guitar, violin, and cello. Commissioned by the Third Angle New Music Ensemble, 1993
- MUTED IN THUNDER for mezzo-soprano, flute, percussion, guitar and female chorus. Commissioned by the Third Angle New Music Ensemble, 1993
- SIX ELECTRIC ETUDES for electric guitar solo. Commissioned by John Tamburello as required concert works for his electric guitar program at New York State University. 1993
- AND THE DISH RAN AWAY WITH THE SPOON for guitar solo. Commissioned by James Reid, Professor of Music at the University of Idaho. 1993
- AUTUMN BURNING for viola and guitar. Commissioned by the Alma Duo, San Francisco, California. 1992
- SUITE OF IMAGINARY BEINGS for flute, violin, viola, cello, and piano. Commissioned by the Northwest Chamber Players. 1992
- LIQUID MUSIC for mixed chorus and harp. Commissioned by Choral Cross-Ties. 1991
- A WEAVE OF SUNLIGHT for guitar and string quartet. Commissioned by David Tanenbaum for California State University's Summer Arts Festival at Humboldt State University. 1991.
- HUMORS for flute, cello, and guitar. Commissioned by the Bel Arts Trio, Los Angeles, California. 1990
- SERENADE, for Viola and Piano. Commissioned by Oregon Symphony Violist, Stephen Price. 1990
- TRIO for Flute, Viola & Guitar. Commissioned by members of The Greater Portland Area Flute Society in memory of John May. 1990
- ROUNDELAY, for Men's Chorus. (Text by Samuel Beckett) Commissioned by the Portland Gay Men's Chorus. 1990
- TOCCATA FESTIVA, Op. 46 for Guitar and Orchestra. Commissioned by the Second American Classical Guitar Congress. 1989
- DUO, Op. 45 for Clarinet and Marimba. Commissioned by Jeffrey Peyton. 1989
- PARTITA, Op. 42 for Chamber Orchestra. Commissioned by The West Coast Chamber Orchestra for the inaugural concert of the Portland Center for the Performing Arts. 1988
- AMERICAN FOLKSONG SUITE, Op. 41, for Electric Guitar and Wind Ensemble. Commissioned by John Tamburello. 1988
- OUTDOOR SERENADE for Electric guitar, electric piano, electric bass and two antiphonal percussionist. Commissioned by the Oregon Arts Commission and U.S. Bank.
- SONATA, Op. 39 for guitar quartet. Commissioned by the Oregon Guitar Quartet. 1986
- METAMORPHOSIS, Op. 36 for guitar solo. Commissioned by Scott Kritzer. 1986
- FRESCO I, Op. 33 for guitar solo. Commissioned by the Guitar Foundation of America for their 1985 International Guitar Festival, held in Los Angeles, California at California State University, Northridge. The work was the required piece for the solo guitar competition. 1985
- FRESCO II, Op. 33 for two guitars. Commissioned by the Guitar Foundation of America for their 1985 International Guitar Festival, held in Los Angeles, California at California State University, Northridge. The work was the required piece for the guitar duo competition. 1985
- SONATINA, Op. 32 for flute, clarinet, and bassoon. Commissioned by Trio Viento. 1984
- LABYRINTH, Op. 30 for guitar solo. Commissioned by David Tanenbaum. 1983
- FRESCO for piano, percussion, electric guitar, and string orchestra. Commissioned by Oregon Ballet. 1981
- DOUBLE CONCERTO, Op. 14 for viola, guitar, and orchestra. Commissioned by the Whalter/Tanenbaum Duo and the Berkeley Promenade Orchestra. 1981
- IPHEGENIA IN AULIS, Op. 10 for viola and guitar. Commissioned by the Whalter/Tanenbaum Duo, Berkeley, California. 1979
- SONATA DA CHIESA, Op. 5 for oboe, French horn, and contrabass. Commissioned by Richard Sarpola for his graduate recital from the New England Conservatory of Music. 1979
- TRIO, Op. 3 for flute, cello, and guitar. Commissioned by the Summerhill Trio. 1978
