= Scott Tennant =

American classical guitarist

- Born: March 1962 (age 64); Detroit, Michigan, U.S.
- Education: University of Southern California
- Occupations: Classical guitarist, author, academic
- Employer(s): San Francisco Conservatory of Music (1989–1993); USC Thornton School of Music (1993–present)
- Known for: Los Angeles Guitar Quartet

Scott Tennant is an American classical guitarist and composer. Tennant is a founding member of the Grammy Award-winning Los Angeles Guitar Quartet.

== Early life and education ==
Born in Detroit, Michigan in March 1962, Tennant began his musical and guitar studies at the age of six. He attended Cass Technical High School in Detroit, where he also studied violin and trombone. Having played the former in the Cass Tech Symphony Orchestra and the latter in the Cass Tech Concert Band, Tennant graduated in the class of 1980.

Tennant was admitted into the school of music of the University of Southern California in 1980, and studied there until 1986. Having won silver medals in both the Toronto International Guitar Competition in 1984 and the Paris Radio France Competition in 1988, Tennant won the gold medal in the Tokyo International Competition as 1989's first-place finisher.

== Career ==
=== Academia ===
Tennant taught guitar at the San Francisco Conservatory of Music from 1989–1993, and has since been on the faculty of the USC Thornton School of Music. Tennant also sits on the faculty of the Pasadena Conservatory of Music.

== Awards and nominations ==
=== Solo ===
- Toronto International Guitar Competition, silver medal, 1984
- Paris Radio France Competition, silver medal, 1988
- Tokyo International Competition, gold medal, 1989

=== Los Angeles Guitar Quartet ===
- Latin, Grammy Award nomination, 2003
- Guitar Heroes, Grammy Award, Best Classical Crossover, 2005
