= List of compositions for guitar =

This article lists the classical guitar music in the classical guitar repertoire. It includes baroque guitar and vihuela music, but not lute music. This music is most commonly performed by classical guitarists and requires the use of a variety of classical guitar techniques to play.

During the Renaissance, the guitar was likely to have been used as it frequently is today in popular music, that is to provide strummed accompaniment for a singer or a small group. There also were several significant music collections published during the 16th century of contrapuntal compositions approaching the complexity, sophistication and breadth of lute music from the same period. Most Renaissance lute music has been transcribed for guitar (see List of composers for lute).

The baroque guitar (c.1600–1750) was a string instrument with five courses of gut strings and moveable gut frets. The first (highest pitched) course was sometimes a single string. It replaced the Renaissance lute as the most common instrument found in the home.

The romantic guitar, in use from approximately 1790 to 1830, was the guitar of the Classical and Romantic period of music, showing remarkable consistency in the instrument's construction during these decades. By this time guitars used six, sometimes more, single strings instead of courses. The romantic guitar eventually led to a different type of guitar in Spain: the fan-braced Spanish guitars of Torres, which may be seen as the immediate precursor of the modern classical guitar.

In the 20th century, many non-guitarist composers wrote for the instrument, whereas previously only players of the instrument had done so.

== 16th century ==
- 1535-36 Luis de Milán (c.1500–after 1561) Libro de musica de vihuela de mano intitulado El Maestro
- 1538 Luis de Narváez (1510–1555) Los seis libros del Delphin de música de cifra para tañer vihuela
- 1546 Alonso Mudarra (c.1508–1580) Tres libros de música
- 1547 Enríquez de Valderrábano (1500–1557) Libro de música
- 1547 Enríquez de Valderrábano (1500–1557) Silva de sirenas
- 1551 Adrian Le Roy (1520–1598) Premier livre de tablature de guiterre
- 1552 Diego Pisador (1509–1557) Libro de Música de Vihuela
- 1553 Grégoire Brayssing (fl. 16th century) Quart livre de tablature de guiterre
- 1554 Miguel de Fuenllana (?1500–1579) Orphénica lyra
- 1576 Esteban Daza (c.1537–1591) El Pamasso
- c.1580 Girolamo Giuliani (fl. 1580) Intabulatura de Chitara

== 17th century ==
- 1640 Giovanni Paolo Foscarini (fl. c.1621–c.1649) Li cinque libri della chitarra alla spagnola
- 1643 Francesco Corbetta (c.1615–1681) Varii capricii per la ghittara spagnuola
- 1646 Carlo Calvi (fl. 17th century) Intavolatura di chitarra, e chitarriglia
- 1650 Domenico Pellegrini (fl. 17th century) Soavi concenti di sonate musicali per la chitarra spagnuola
- 1659 Giovanni Battista Granata (c.1620–1687) Soavi concenti di sonate musicali per la chitarra spagnuola
- 1674 Gaspar Sanz (1640–1710) Instrucción de música sobre la guitarra española
- 1682 Robert de Visée (c.1650–1725) Livre di guittarre dédié au roy
- 1692 Ludovico Roncalli (1660?–1720?) Capricci armonici sopra la chitarra spagnola
- 1694 Francesc Guerau (1649–1722) Poema Harmónico

== 18th century ==
- 1716 François Campion (1680–1748) Nouvelles découvertes sur la guitare
- c.1730 Santiago de Murcia (1682–1735?) Codice Saldivar no. 4

== 19th century ==
- c.1802 Fernando Sor (1778–1839) Sonata op. 15b
- 1807 Simon Molitor (1766–1848) Große Sonate op. 7
- 1809 Mauro Giuliani (1781–1829) Grande Ouverture op. 61
- 1810 Ferdinando Carulli (1770–1841) Method for the guitar op. 241
- 1821 Fernando Sor (1778–1839) Variations on a Theme of Mozart op. 9
- 1825 Dionisio Aguado y García (1784–1849) Trois Rondos brillants op. 2
- 1847 Johann Kaspar Mertz (1806–1856) Bardenklänge op. 13
- c.1850 Johann Kaspar Mertz (1806–1856) Elegie
- 1851 Johann Dubez (1828–1891) Fantaisie sur des motifs hongrois
- 1853 Matteo Carcassi (1792–1853) 25 Studies op. 60
- 1899 Francisco Tárrega (1852–1909) Recuerdos de la Alhambra

== 20th century ==
=== 1900s ===
- ?1906 Ottorino Respighi (1879–1936) Variazioni

=== 1920s ===
- 1920 Federico Moreno Torroba (1891–1982) Suite Castellana
- 1920 Manuel de Falla (1876–1946) Homenaje: Le Tombeau de Claude Debussy
- 1920 Heitor Villa-Lobos (1887–1959) Chôros No. 1
- 1921 Agustín Barrios (1885–1944) La Catedral
- ?1921 Henri Collet (1885–1951) Briviesca
- 1923 Carlos Chávez (1899–1978) Three Pieces
- 1923 Federico Moreno Torroba (1891–1982) Sonatina in A major
- 1923 Joaquín Turina (1882–1949) Sevillana, Op. 29
- 1925 Manuel Ponce (1882–1948) Sonata mexicana
- 1925 Joaquín Turina (1882–1949) Fandanguillo, Op. 36
- 1926 Pierre de Bréville (1861–1949) Fantaisie
- 1927 Manuel Ponce (1882–1948) Sonata No. 3
- 1927 Cyril Scott (1879–1970) Sonatina
- 1928 Manuel Ponce (1882–1948) Sonata clásica
- 1928 Heitor Villa-Lobos (1887–1959) Suite populaire brésilienne
- 1929 Manuel Ponce (1882–1948) Sonatina romántica
- 1929 Manuel Ponce (1882–1948) Variations and Fugue on 'La Folia de Espana'
- 1929 Heitor Villa-Lobos (1887–1959) 12 Etudes

=== 1930s ===
- ?1930 Óscar Esplá (1886–1976) Tempo di sonata
- 1931 Joaquín Turina (1882–1949) Sonata
- 1932 Manuel Ponce (1882–1948) Homenaje a Tárrega
- 1932 Joaquín Turina (1882–1949) Hommage à Tárrega, op. 69
- 1933 Antonio José Martínez Palacios (1902–1936) Sonata
- 1933 Frank Martin (1890–1974) Quatre Pièces Brèves
- 1935 Mario Castelnuovo-Tedesco (1895–1968) Sonata (Omaggio a Boccherini)
- 1939 Boris Asafyev (1884–1949) Prélude et valse
- 1939 Manuel Ponce (1882–1948) Sonatina meridional
- 1939 Joaquín Rodrigo (1901–1999) En los trigales

=== 1940s ===
- 1940 Heitor Villa-Lobos (1887–1959) Five Preludes
- 1942 Jarmil Burghauser (1921–1997) Six Czech Dances
- 1942 Joaquín Rodrigo (1901–1999) Entre olivares
- 1943 Jarmil Burghauser (1921–1997) Sonata in E minor
- 1944 Marius Flothuis (1914–2001) Twee stukken, op. 22
- 1948 José Ardévol (1911–1981) Sonata
- 1949 Erik Bergman (1911–2006) Suite, op. 32

=== 1950s ===
- 1950 Federico Moreno Tórroba (1891–1982) Sonata-Fantasia
- 1951 Heitor Villa-Lobos (1887–1959) Concerto for guitar and small orchestra
- 1952 Bruno Bartolozzi (1911–1980) Tre pezzi
- 1952 Lou Harrison (1917–2003) Serenado
- 1952 Alexandre Tansman (1896–1987) Cavatina
- 1953 Henri Gagnebin (1886–1977) Trois pièces
- 1954-5 Ettore Desderi (1892–1974) Sonata in mi
- 1955 Hans Erich Apostel (1901–1972) Sechs Musiken
- 1956 Reginald Smith Brindle (1917–2003) El Polifemo de Oro
- 1957 Lennox Berkeley (1903–1989) Sonatina, op. 52, no. 1
- 1957 Leo Brouwer (born 1939) Danza característica
- 1957 Roberto Gerhard (1896–1970) Fantasia: Interlude in Cantares
- 1957 Ernst Krenek (1900–1991) Suite
- 1957 Darius Milhaud (1892–1974) Segoviana, op. 366
- 1957 Maurice Ohana (1914–1992) Tiento
- 1957 Marilyn Ziffrin (born 1926) Rhapsody
- 1958 Camargo Guarnieri (1907–1993) Estudo nº1
- 1958 Hans Werner Henze (1926-2012) Drei Tentos
- 1958 Einojuhani Rautavaara (born 1928) Partita
- 1959 Tristram Cary (1925–2008) Sonata for Guitar Alone
- 1959 Giorgio Federico Ghedini (1892–1965) Studio da concerto
- 1959 Goffredo Petrassi (1904–2003) Suoni notturni
- 1959 Carlos Surinach (1915–1997) Sonatina

=== 1960s ===
- 1960 Georges Auric (1899–1983) Hommage à Alonso Mudarra
- 1960 Francis Poulenc (1899–1963) Sarabande
- 1960 Joaquín Rodrigo (1901–1999) Sonata giocosa
- 1961 Henk Badings (1907–1987) 12 Preludes
- 1961 Cornelius Cardew (1936–1981) Piece (for Stella)
- 1961 Hans Haug (1900–1967) Prélude, tiento et toccata
- 1961 Gian Francesco Malipiero (1882–1973) Preludio
- 1961 Joaquín Rodrigo (1901–1999) Invocación y danza
- 1961 Rudolf Wagner-Régeny (1903–1969) Sonatine
- 1961 Thomas Wilson (1927–2001) Three Pieces
- 1962 Jean Absil (1893–1974) Dix pièces, op. 111
- 1962 Louis Andriessen (1939–2021) Triplum
- 1962 Girolamo Arrigo (born 1930) Serenata
- 1962 Leo Brouwer (born 1939) Danza del antiplano
- 1962 Leo Brouwer (born 1939) Tango
- 1963 Jean Absil (1893–1974) Suite, op. 114
- 1963 Benjamin Britten (1913–1976) Nocturnal after John Dowland, op. 70
- 1963 Stephen Dodgson (1924-2013) Partita
- 1963 Cristóbal Halffter (born 1930) Codex I
- 1963 André Jolivet (1905–1974) Deux études de concert
- 1963 Joaquín Rodrigo (1901–1999) Tres piezas españolas
- 1963-64 Maurice Ohana (1914–1992) Si le jour paraît...
- 1964 Jean Absil (1893–1974) Pièces caracteristiques, op. 123
- 1964 Leo Brouwer (born 1939) Elogio de la danza
- 1964 Federico Mompou (1893–1987) Suite compostelana
- 1965 Stephen Dodgson (1924-2013) with Hector Quine 20 Studies
- 1965 Alcidez Lanza (born 1929) modulos I
- 1965 Antonio Ruiz-Pipò (1934–1997) Cinqo Movimientos para la guitarra de diez cuerdas de Narciso Yepes
- 1967 Leonardo Balada (born 1933) Analogías
- 1967 Gottfried von Einem (1918–1996) Drei Studien, op. 34
- ?1968 Richard Arnell (1917–2009) Six Pieces
- 1968 Mason Williams (born 1938) Classical Gas
- 1968 Richard Rodney Bennett (1936-2012) Impromptus
- 1968 Leo Brouwer (born 1939) Canticum
- 1968 Jarmil Burghauser (1921–1997) Sarabanda e toccata
- 1968 John W. Duarte (1919–2004) English Suite
- 1968 Tom Eastwood (1922–1999) Ballade-Phantasy
- 1968 John McCabe (born 1939) Canto
- 1968 Josep Mestres-Quadreny (born 1929) Perludi
- 1968 Leon Schidlowsky (born 1931) Interludio
- 1969 David Bedford (born 1937) You Asked For It
- 1969 Stephen Dodgson (1924-2013) Fantasy-Divisions
- 1969 Peter Racine Fricker (1920–1990) Paseo
- 1969 Elisabeth Lutyens (1906–1983) The Dying of the Sun

=== 1970s ===
==== 1970 ====
- 1970 Jean Absil (1893–1974) Sur un paravent chinois, op. 147
- 1970 Jean Absil (1893–1974) Quatre pièces, op. 150
- 1970 Jean Absil (1893–1974) Petit bestiaire, op. 151
- 1970 Denis ApIvor (1916–2004) Discanti, op. 48
- 1970 Vicente Asencio (1908–1979) Collectici íntim
- 1970 Lennox Berkeley (1903–1989) Theme and Variations
- 1970 Jarmil Burghauser (1921–1997) Tesknice: Canti dell'Ansietà
- 1970 Tom Eastwood (1922–1999) Amphora
- 1970 Ferenc Farkas (1905–2000) Six pièces brèves
- 1970 Joseph Horovitz (born 1926) Ghetto Song
- 1970 Armin Kaufmann (1902–1980) Rhapsodie
- 1970 François Morel (born 1926) Me duele españa
- 1970 Reginald Smith Brindle (1917–2003) Variants on Two Themes of J. S. Bach

==== 1971 ====
- 1971 Malcolm Arnold (1921–2006) Fantasy, Op. 107
- 1971 Leo Brouwer (born 1939) La espiral eterna
- 1971 David Farquhar (1928–2007) Five Scenes
- 1971 Harrison Kerr (1897–1978) Variations on a Theme from "The Tower of Kel"
- 1971 Bruno Maderna (1920–1973) Y después
- 1971 Goffredo Petrassi (1904–2003) Nunc
- 1971 Alan Rawsthorne (1905–1971) Elegy
- 1971 Guido Santórsola (1904–1994) Sonata No. 2 "Hispanica"
- 1971 William Walton (1902–1983) Five Bagatelles

==== 1972 ====
- 1972 Jean Absil (1893–1974) Douze pièces, op. 159
- 1972 Denis ApIvor (1916–2004) Saeta, op. 53
- 1972 Luciano Chailly (1920–2002) Invenzione su quattro note
- 1972 Peter Maxwell Davies (1934–2016) Lullaby for Illian Rainbow
- 1972 André Jolivet (1905–1974) Tombeau de Robert de Visée
- 1972 Giles Swayne (born 1946) Canto
- 1972 Arthur Wills (born 1929) Sonata

==== 1973 ====
- 1973 Xavier Benguerel (born 1931) Versus
- 1973 Leo Brouwer (born 1939) Parabola
- 1973 Leo Brouwer (born 1939) Per suonare a duo
- 1973 Philippe Drogoz (born 1937) Prélude à la Mise à Mort
- 1973 Angelo Gilardino (born 1941) Tenebrae factae sunt
- 1973 Edward McGuire (born 1948) Music for Guitar(s)
- 1973 Per Nørgård (1932–2025) Libra
- 1973 Poul Ruders (born 1949) Jargon
- 1973 Reginald Smith Brindle (1917–2003) Memento in Two Movements

==== 1974 ====
- 1974 William Bolcom (born 1938) Seasons
- 1974 Robert Beaser (born 1954) Canti Notturni
- 1974-6 Axel Borup-Jørgensen (born 1924) Praeambula, op. 72
- 1974 Leo Brouwer (born 1939) Tarantos
- 1974 Carlos Chávez (1899–1978) Feuille d'album
- 1974 Jindřich Feld (1925–2007) Barbaric Dance
- 1974 Jindřich Feld (1925–2007) Sonata
- 1974 Edino Krieger (1928–2022) Ritmata
- 1974 Jorge Labrouve (born 1948) Nueva, op. 8
- 1974 Jorge Labrouve (born 1948) Enigma, op. 9
- 1974 Humphrey Searle (1915–1982) Five, op. 61
- 1974 Reginald Smith Brindle (1917–2003) Do Not Go Gentle...
- 1974 Reginald Smith Brindle (1917–2003) November Memories
- 1974 Richard Stoker (1938–2021) Sonatina, op. 42
- 1974 Toru Takemitsu (1930–1996) Folios

==== 1975 ====
- 1975 José Ramón Encinar (born 1954) El aire de saber cerrar los ojos
- 1975 Hans Gefors (born 1952) La boîte chinoise, op. 12:1
- 1975 Anthony Hedges (1931-2019) Three Fancies
- 1975 Jean-Paul Holstein (born 1939) Du futur... à... l'au-delà
- 1975 Reginald Smith Brindle (1917–2003) Four Poems of García Lorca
- 1975 Michael Blake Watkins (born 1948) Solus
- 1975 Flemming Weis (1898–1981) Aspects

==== 1976 ====
- 1976 Jorge de Freitas Antunes (born 1942) Sighs
- 1976 Walter Boudreau, CM CQ (1947) Le Cercle gnostique
- 1976 Stephen Dodgson (1924-2013) Partita No. 2
- 1976 Michael Finnissy (born 1946) Song 17
- 1976 Alberto Ginastera (1916–1983) Sonata for guitar (1976)
- 1976-9 Hans Werner Henze (1926–2012) Royal Winter Music I
- 1976 Per Nørgård (born 1932) Returns
- 1976 Ib Nørholm (born 1931) Sonata No. 1, Op. 69
- 1976 Poul Rovsing-Olsen (1922–1982) Nostalgie, op. 78
- 1976 Reginald Smith Brindle (1917–2003) Sonata No. 2 "El Verbo"
- 1976 Giles Swayne (born 1946) Suite
- 1976 Claude Vivier (1948 – 1983) Pour Guitare

==== 1977 ====
- 1977 William Albright (1944–1998) Shadows: Eight Serenades
- 1977 Theodore Antoniou (born 1935) Stichomythia II
- 1977 Vytautas Barkauskas (born 1931) Suite B
- 1977 Bruno Bartolozzi (1911–1980) Adles
- 1977 Erik Bergman (1911–2006) Midnight, op. 83
- 1977 Gilbert Biberian (born 1944) Sonata No. 3
- 1977 William Bland (born 1947) A Fantasy-Homage to Tomás Luis de Victoria
- 1977 Stephen Dodgson (1924-2013) Legend
- 1977 Franco Donatoni (1927–2000) Algo
- 1977 Denis Dufour (born 1953) Boucles, op. 5
- 1977 Tom Eastwood (1922–1999) Romance et plainte
- 1977 Oliver Hunt (1934–2000) Garuda - Ballade
- 1977 Douglas Jamieson (born 1949) Elegy
- 1977 Elisabeth Lutyens (1906–1983) Romanza
- 1977 Einojuhani Rautavaara (born 1928) Serenades of the Unicorn
- 1977 José Peris (born 1924) Elegía para Gisela
- 1977 Michèle Reverdy (born 1943) Number One
- 1977 Tristan Murail (born 1947) Tellur
- 1977 Thomas Wilson (1927–2001) Canción

==== 1978 ====
- 1978 Violet Archer (1913–2000) Fantasy on 'Blanche comme le neige'
- 1978 Gunnar Berg (1909–1989) Fresques
- 1978 Dušan Bogdanović (born 1955) Sonata No. 1
- 1978 Stephen Dodgson (1924-2013) Merlin
- 1978 Jean Françaix (1912–1997) Serenata
- 1978 Lou Harrison (1917–2003) Plaint and Variations on Walter von der Vogelweide's "Song of Palestine"
- 1978 Lou Harrison (1917–2003) Serenade
- 1978 Nestor de Hollanda Cavalcanti (born 1949) Suite Quadrada
- 1978 Per Nørgård (born 1932) In Memory of...
- 1978 Reginald Smith Brindle (1917–2003) Sonata No. 3 "The Valley of Esdralon"
- 1978 Reginald Smith Brindle (1917–2003) Sonata No. 4 "La Breve"
- 1978 Michael Blake Watkins (born 1948) The Spirit of the Earth

==== 1979 ====
- 1979 John Addison (1920–1998) Illyrian Lullaby
- 1979 Gustavo Becerra-Schmidt (born 1925) Third Sonata
- 1979 Judith Bingham (born 1952) Moonrise
- 1979 Edward Cowie (born 1943) Commedia Lazis
- 1979 David Del Tredici (born 1937) Acrostic Song (Final Alice)
- 1979 Petr Eben (1929–2007) Mare Nigrum
- 1979 Ferenc Farkas (1905–2000) Sonata
- 1979 Vagn Holmboe (1909–1996) Sonata No. 1, Op. 141
- 1979 Vagn Holmboe (1909–1996) Sonata No. 2, Op. 142
- 1979 Alan Hovhaness (1911–2000) Sonata No. 1
- 1979 Alan Hovhaness (1911–2000) Sonata No. 2
- 1979 Wilfred Josephs (1927–1997) Thoughts on a Spanish Guitar, Op. 111
- 1979 Stephen Oliver (1950–1992) Sonata
- 1979 Kenneth Platts (1946–1989) Sonatina
- 1979 Reginald Smith Brindle (1917–2003) Sonata No. 5
- 1979 Richard Stoker (born 1938) Pieces for Polita, Op. 57
- 1979 Hans Werner Henze (1926-2012) Royal Winter Music II
- 1979 Dang Ngoc Long (born 1957) "The Central Highlands of Tay Nguyen"

=== 1980s ===
==== 1980 ====
- 1980 Denis ApIvor (1916–2004) Serenade, Op. 69
- 1980 Aldo Clementi (1925–2011) Dodici variazioni
- 1980 Dror Feiler (born 1951) Aria
- 1980 Barbara Kolb (born 1939) Three Lullabies
- 1980 Nikita Koshkin (born 1956) The Prince's Toys
- 1980 Einojuhani Rautavaara (born 1928) Monologues of the Unicorn
- 1980 Robert Beaser (born 1954) Notes on a Southern Sky
- 1980 Ned Rorem (1923–2022) Suite
- 1980 Reginald Smith Brindle (1917–2003) Preludes and Fantasies

==== 1981 ====
- 1981 Leo Brouwer (born 1939) El Decameron negro
- 1981 Leo Brouwer (born 1939) Preludios epigramáticos
- 1981 Marius Constant (born 1925) D'une élégie slave
- 1981 Peter Maxwell Davies (1934–2016) Hill Runes
- 1981 Edison Denisov (1929–1996) Sonata
- 1981 Stephen Dodgson (1924-2013) Partita No. 3
- 1981 Petr Eben (1929–2007) Tabulatura Nova
- 1981 Vagn Holmboe (1909–1996) Five Intermezzi, op. 149
- 1981 John Anthony Lennon (born 1950) Another's Fandango
- 1981 Edward McGuire (born 1948) Prelude No. 5
- 1981-2 Bayan Northcott (born 1940) Fantasia

==== 1982 ====
- 1982 Denis ApIvor (1916–2004) Five Pieces, Op. 72a
- 1982 Denis ApIvor (1916–2004) Five Pieces, Op. 72b
- 1982 Xavier Benguerel (born 1931) Cantus
- 1982 Michael Berkeley (born 1948) Sonata in One Movement
- 1982 Robert Boelen (born 1949) Interlude in Em
- 1982 Amaury du Closel (1956–2024) Cadence
- 1982 Ferenc Farkas (1905–2000) Exercitium Tonale
- 1982 Michael Finnissy (born 1946) Nasiye
- 1982 Stanley Glasser (born 1926) Arbor
- 1982 Maurice Ohana (1914-1992) Cadran Lunaire*

==== 1983 ====
- 1983 Richard Rodney Bennett (1936-2012) Sonata
- 1983 Antonio Bibalo (born 1922) Study in Blue
- 1983 Michel-Georges Brégent (1948 - 1993) Sapho
- 1983 Elliott Carter (1908–2012) Changes
- 1983-9 Brian Ferneyhough (born 1943) Kurze Schatten II
- 1983 Michel Gonneville (born 1950) Le Sommeil, le Regard, le Choix
- 1983 François Morel (born 1926) Divergences
- 1983 Jean Papineau-Couture CC GOQ (1916–2000) Exploration
- 1983 Michael Tippett (1905–1998) The Blue Guitar

==== 1984 ====
- 1984 Denis ApIvor (1916–2004) Nocturne, Op. 78
- 1984 Milton Babbitt (1916–2011) Composition for Guitar
- 1984 Bruno Bettinelli (1913–2004) Tre pezzi
- 1984 Peter Maxwell Davies (1934–2016) Sonata
- 1984 Halim El-Dabh (1921-2017) Wedding Time
- 1984 Michael Jacques (born 1944) Three Humoresques (Hommage à Walton)
- 1984 Andrew Paul MacDonald (born 1958) Fantasy Sonata
- 1984 Richard Stoker (born 1938) Dance Movements, op. 66
- 1984 John Tavener (1944–2013) Chant
- 1984 Giulio Viozzi (1912–1984) Sonata

==== 1985 ====
- 1985 Radamés Gnattali (1906–1988) Petite Suite
- 1985 Samuel Adler (born 1928) Sonata
- 1985 Dušan Bogdanović (born 1955) Sonata No. 2
- 1985 Alfonso Casanova (born 1953) 4 Breverías
- 1985 Alfonso Casanova (born 1953) Preludio Digital
- 1985 Carlo Domeniconi (born 1947) Koyunbaba
- 1985 Dror Feiler (born 1951) Sun Shade
- 1985 Dang Ngoc Long (born 1957) "For Thay"
- 1985 Graciane Finzi (born 1945) Non si muove una foglia
- 1985 Angelo Gilardino (born 1941) Sonata No. 1 ("Omaggio ad Antonio Fontanesi")
- 1985 Piers Hellawell (born 1956) Improvise! Improvise!
- 1985 Per Nørgård (born 1932) Tales From a Hand I: In the Mood of Spades
- 1985 Henri Sauguet (1901–1989) Cadence

==== 1986 ====
- 1986 Sérgio Assad (born 1952) Aquarelle
- 1986 Leo Brouwer (born 1939) From Yesterday to Penny Lane (Lennon-McCartney)
- 1986 Leo Brouwer (born 1939) Paisaje cubano con campanas
- 1986 Luciano Chailly (1920–2002) Improvvisazione
- 1986 Sidney Corbett (born 1960) Arien IV: Solo Music for Guitar
- 1986 James Dillon (born 1950) Shrouded Mirrors
- 1986 Roland Dyens (born 1955) Libra Sonatine
- 1986 John Frandsen (born 1956) Nature Morte
- 1986 Angelo Gilardino (born 1941) Sonata No. 2 ("Hivern florit")
- 1986 Andrew Paul MacDonald (born 1958) A Dancing Sphere
- 1986 Concepción Lebrero (born 1937) Remembranza de Juan de la Cruz
- 1986 Mel Powell (1923–1998) Setting
- 1986 Gerhard Präsent (born 1957) Praeludium und Toccata
- 1986 Roger Reynolds (born 1934) The Behaviour of Mirrors
- 1986 Giles Swayne (born 1946) Solo, op. 42
- 1986 Alois Bröder (born 1961) Erdferne

==== 1987 ====
- 1986 Leo Brouwer (born 1939) Toronto Guitar Concerto No. 4
- 1987 Dao (born 1940) Nam aï
- 1987 Bent Lorentzen (born 1935) Umbra
- 1987 Robert Saxton (born 1953) Night Dance
- 1987 R. Murray Schafer (1933–2021) Le Cri de Merlin
- 1987 Jacques Hétu (1938–2010) Suite, Op. 41

==== 1988 ====
- 1988 Luciano Berio (1925–2003) Sequenza XI
- 1988 Denis Dufour (born 1953) Grenouille écarlate, Op. 51
- 1988 Toru Takemitsu (1930–1996) All in Twilight

==== 1989 ====
- 1989 Miguel Angel Cherubito (born 1941) Suite Popular Argentina
- 1989 Peter Dickinson (born 1934) Five Explorations
- 1989 Stephen Dodgson (1924-2013) Partita No. 4
- 1989 Angelo Gilardino (born 1941) Variazioni sulla Follìa
- 1989 Eduardo Martin (born 1956) Canciones del Calendario
- 1989 Eduardo Martin (born 1956) Pasajero en el tiempo
- 1989 Nicholas Maw (1935-2009) Music of Memory
- 1989 Per Nørgård (born 1932) Tales From a Hand III: Clubs among Jokers
- 1989 R. Murray Schafer (born 1933) Guitar Concerto

=== 1990s ===
==== 1990 ====
- 1990 Leo Brouwer (born 1939) Sonata
- 1990 Dror Feiler (born 1951) Fire, Walk With Me
- 1990 Romuald Grinblat (1930–1995) Intermezzo
- 1990 David Hönigsberg (1959-2005) African Sonata (rev. 2004)
- 1990 Grigoriy Korchmar (born 1947) White Nights Serenades
- 1990 Ester Mägi (1922–2021) Valse con variazione
- 1990 Ursula Mamlok (born 1928) Five Intermezzi
- 1990 Tage Nielsen (born 1929) The Frosty Silence in the Gardens
- 1990 Pēteris Vasks (born 1946) Sonata of Loneliness
- 1990 Graham Whettam (1927–2007) Guitar Partita (original version 1968)

==== 1991 ====
- 1991 Michel-Georges Brégent (1948 - 1993) Concierto Flamenco
- 1991 Chris Dench (born 1953) Severance
- 1991 Anders Eliasson (born 1947) Untitled
- 1991 Christopher Fox (born 1955) Chile
- 1991 Angelo Gilardino (born 1941) Musica per l'angelo della Melancholìa
- 1991 Veli-Matti Puumala (born 1965) Hailin' Drams
- 1991 Jeanne Zaidel-Rudolph (born 1948) Five African Sketches

==== 1992 ====
- 1992 Daniel Asia (born 1953) Your Cry Will Be A Whisper
- 1992 Sinan Savaskan (born 1954) O Vos omnes Op.27 - Gesualdo premonitions
- 1986 Leo Brouwer (born 1939) Helsinki guitarconcert no.5

==== 1993 ====
- 1993 Robert Boelen (born 1949) Interlude in G
- 1993 Leo Brouwer (born 1939) Rito de los Orishas
- 1993 Ferenc Farkas (1905–2000) Tiento
- 1993 Dror Feiler (born 1951) We Are A Bomb
- 1993 Claudio Galante (born 1960) Deux esquisses
- 1993 Robert Keeley (born 1960) Two Ways of Looking at a Spider
- 1993 Arne Löthman (born 1954) Diptych
- 1993 Eduardo Martin (born 1956) Album de la Inocencia
- 1993 Terry Riley (born 1935) Ascención
- 1993 Toru Takemitsu (1930–1996) Equinox
- 1993 Param Vir (born 1952) Clear Light, Magic Body

==== 1994 ====
- 1994 Franghiz Ali-Zadeh (born 1947) Phantasie
- 1994 Mary Jeanne van Appledorn (born 1927) Postcards to John
- 1994 Xavier Benguerel (born 1931) Preludio indefinido
- 1994 Poul Ruders (born 1949) Etude and Ricercare
- 1994 Reginald Smith Brindle (1917–2003) The Prince of Venosa
- 1994 Charles Wuorinen (1938–2020) Guitar Variations

==== 1995 ====
- 1995 Howard Blake (born 1938) Prelude, Sarabande and Gigue
- 1995 T. E. Fleming Solis-Prim
- 1995 Aaron Jay Kernis (born 1960) Partita
- 1995 Gordon McPherson (born 1965) Uncanny Valley
- 1995 Thea Musgrave (born 1928) Postcards from Spain
- 1995 Lior Navok (born 1971) Remembrances of Jerusalem
- 1995 Per Nørgård (born 1932) Tales From a Hand II: The Queen of Hearts
- 1995 Terry Riley (born 1935) Barabas
- 1995 Pascale Criton (born 1954) La Ritournelle et le galop

==== 1996 ====
- 1996 Leo Brouwer (born 1939) Hika: In Memoriam Toru Takemitsu
- 1996 Martin Derungs (born 1943) Elegie, op. 59
- 1996 René Eespere (born 1953) Evocatio
- 1996 Bryn Harrison (born 1969) Forms of Distance
- 1996 John Anthony Lennon (born 1950) Gigolo
- 1996 John Anthony Lennon (born 1950) Sonatina
- 1996 John Anthony Lennon (born 1950) Thirteen
- 1996 Ester Mägi (1922–2021) 3 Miniatuuri
- 1996 Eduardo Martin (born 1956) Preludio, Son y Allegro
- 1996 Toru Takemitsu (1930–1996) In the Woods
- 1996 Richard Wernick (born 1934) Da'ase

==== 1997 ====
- 1997 Joanna Bailie (born 1973) Primary Interpolations
- 1997 Chris Dench (born 1953) Asymptotic Freedom
- 1997 Robert Beaser (born 1954) Shenandoah
- 1997 Elliott Carter (1908–2012) Shard
- 1997 James Erber (born 1951) Am Grabe Memphis Minnies
- 1997 Deirdre Gribbin (born 1967) The Sanctity of Trees
- 1997 Sam Hayden (born 1968) AXE(S)
- 1997 Paul Lansky (born 1944) Semi-Suite
- 1997 Mario Lavista (born 1943) Natarayah
- 1997 Jyrki Linjama (born 1962) Sonaatti
- 1997 Poul Ruders (born 1949) Chaconne
- 1997 Hirokazu Sato (born 1966) Mountains, Wind and the Lake

==== 1998 ====
- 1998 Niels Viggo Bentzon (1919–2000) Strumenta Diabolico, Op. 664
- 1998 Philip Cashian (born 1960) Talvi
- 1998 Mark Delpriora (born 1959) Sonata No. 3
- 1998 Ross Edwards (born 1943) Blackwattle Caprices
- 1998 Richard Emsley (born 1951) for guitar 1
- 1998 Bryn Harrison (born 1969) Fractured Spaces
- 1998 John Anthony Lennon (born 1950) The Fortunels
- 1998 Eduardo Martin (born 1956) Divertimentos Tropicales
- 1998 Per Nørgård (born 1932) Early Morn: Five Preludes and a Serenade
- 1998 Hannu Pohjannoro (born 1963) kuun kiertoa kohti

==== 1999 ====
- 1999 Simon Bainbridge (1952–2021) Dances for Moon Animals
- 1999 Sally Beamish (born 1956) Madrigal
- 1999 Erik Bergman (1911–2006) Extase, op. 143
- 1999 Leo Brouwer (born 1939) An Idea (Passacaglia for Eli)
- 1999 Leo Brouwer (born 1939) Paisaje cubano con tristeza
- 1999 Philip Cashian (born 1960) Black Venus
- 1999 René Eespere (born 1953) Staminis
- 1999 Philippe Fénelon (born 1952) Nocturnes
- 1999 Howard Skempton (born 1947) Five Preludes

==== 2000 ====
- 2000 Paul Clay (born 1977) Blink
- 2000 Gabriel Erkoreka (born 1969) Fantasia
- 2000 Graham Fitkin (born 1963) Skirting
- 2000 Mike Frengel (born 1972) And Then, Romina...
- 2000 Angelo Gilardino (born 1941) Winterzeit (after Robert Schumann)
- 2000 Michael Zev Gordon (born 1963) Bells, Lachrimae and Stillness
- 2000 Lior Navok (born 1971) Meditation
- 2000 Alwynne Pritchard (born 1968) Nostos ou Topos II
- 2000 Errollyn Wallen (born 1958) Three Ships

== 21st century ==
=== 2001 ===
- 2001 Jonathan Cole (born 1970) Suntrap
- 2001 Per Nørgård (born 1932) Tales From a Hand IV: Jack of Diamonds
- 2001 Alexander Shchetynsky (born 1960) Five Miniatures
- 2001-3 Howard Skempton (born 1947) Five Miniatures

=== 2002 ===
- 2002 Alois Bröder (born 1961) Fünf Verse
- 2002 René Eespere (born 1953) Motus
- 2002 Angelo Gilardino (born 1941) Colloquio con Andrés Segovia
- 2002 Angelo Gilardino (born 1941) Sonatine des fleurs et des oiseaux
- 2002 Angelo Gilardino (born 1941) Tríptico de las visiones
- 2002 Juho Kangas (born 1976) Fantasia
- 2002 Alastair King (born 1967) Three Dance Miniatures
- 2002 Karl-Wieland Kurz (born 1961) I giardini del sogno
- 2002 Eduardo Martin (born 1956) En Cinco Lineas
- 2002 Lior Navok (born 1971) Blurred Formations

=== 2003 ===
- 2003 Angelo Gilardino (born 1941) Catskill Pond
- 2003 Angelo Gilardino (born 1941) La casa del faro
- 2003 John Anthony Lennon (born 1950) Concert Etudes
- 2003 Andrew Paul MacDonald (born 1958) Don Quixote, Knight of the Sad Countenance
- 2003 Joby Talbot (born 1971) Standing Wave
- 2003 Augusta Read Thomas (born 1964) Dialogs

=== 2004 ===
- 2004 Denis Dufour (born 1953) Rainette verte, op. 130
- 2004 René Eespere (born 1953) Evocatio
- 2004 Mike Frengel (born 1972) Slinky
- 2004 Angelo Gilardino (born 1941) Annunziazione (Omaggio al Beato Angelico)
- 2004 Angelo Gilardino (born 1941) Ikonostas (Omaggio a Pavel Florenskij
- 2004 Angelo Gilardino (born 1941) Memory of Antinous (Omaggio a Marguerite Yourcenar)
- 2004 Angelo Gilardino (born 1941) Sonata Mediterranea
- 2004 Angelo Gilardino (born 1941) Sonata del Guadalquivir
- 2004 Magnus Lindberg (born 1958) Mano a mano
- 2004 Olli Mustonen (born 1967) Jehkin Iivana (Sonata for Guitar)
- 2004 Kurt Schwertsik (born 1935) Ein kleines Requiem, op. 97

=== 2005 ===
- 2005 Aldo Clementi (1925–2011) F.A.C.
- 2005 Mark Delpriora (born 1959) Pocket Sonata
- 2005 Angelo Gilardino (born 1941) A Quiet Song (to the memory of John Duarte)
- 2005 José María Sánchez-Verdú (born 1968) Volaverunt

=== 2006 ===
- 2006 Dang Ngoc Long (born 1957) "Mienman"
- 2006 Joseph Atkins (born 1981) Indian Summer
- 2006 Gabriel Jackson (born 1962) Fantasia with Chorale (with bells)

=== 2007 ===
- 2007 Carlo Forlivesi (born 1971) En la soledat i el silenci
- 2007 Carlo Forlivesi (born 1971) Ugetsu
- 2007 Lior Navok (born 1971) Through the Alleys of Time
- 2007 Mark-Anthony Turnage (born 1960) Air with Variations

=== 2008 ===
- 2008 Martin Bresnick (born 1946) Joaquín is Dreaming (Joaquín Soñando)
- 2008 Bob Dickinson (born 1955) The Silence of Temples and Shrines
- 2008 Benjamin Dwyer (born 1965) Twelve Études
- 2008 Carlo Forlivesi (born 1971) Diferencias sobre el Finsterling
- 2008 Angelo Gilardino (born 1941) Sonata di Lagonegro
- 2008 Angelo Gilardino (born 1941) Winter Tales
- 2008 Paul Lansky (born 1944) Practical Preludes
- 2008 Poul Ruders (born 1949) Pages
- 2008 Steffen Schleiermacher (born 1960) Nadie nos ha visto (to Goya)
- 2008 Alexander Shchetynsky (born 1960) Meditation
- 2008 Dang Ngoc Long (born 1957) "Bamboo Ber"

=== 2009 ===
- 2009 Dušan Bogdanović (born 1955) Diptycha super nomen Paul Gerrits
- 2009 Dušan Bogdanović (born 1955) Fantasia: Hommage à Maurice Ohana
- 2009 Joe Cutler (born 1968) September Fragments
- 2009 Carlo Domeniconi (born 1947) Nam guitar solo
- 2009 Carlo Domeniconi (born 1947) Uzh i ya li moloda
- 2009 Máximo Diego Pujol (born 1957) El arte de la milonga

=== 2010 ===
- 2010 Dang Ngoc Long (born 1957) "Morning Mai"
- 2010 David Del Tredici (born 1937) Facts of Life
- 2010 Carlo Forlivesi (born 1971) Lachrimae Rerum
- 2010 Christopher Fox (born 1955) as air, as light
- 2010 Mike Frengel (born 1972) Hotbird
- 2010 Denis Gougeon (born 1951) Lamento-Scherzo
- 2010 Tiziano Manca (born 1970) Stur
- 2010 Lior Navok (born 1971) Guitar Concerto

=== 2012 ===
- 2012 Charlotte Bray (born 1982) Passing Shadows
- 2012 Sebastian Fagerlund (born 1972) Kromos
- 2012 Matthew Taylor (born 1964) Fantasy

=== 2013 ===
- 2013 Harrison Birtwistle (born 1934) Construction with Guitar
- 2013 Leo Brouwer (born 1939) Sonata No. 5: Ars Combinatoria

=== 2020 ===
- 2020 Lior Navok (born 1971) Sarigim
