= Gilardino =

Gilardino is an Italian surname. Notable people with the surname include:

- Alberto Gilardino (born 1982), Italian footballer
- Angelo Gilardino (1941–2022), Italian composer, guitarist, and musicologist
