= Modes de jeu =

The modes de jeu (modes of playing) are specific musical techniques developed to enrich the timbre capabilities of musical instruments. Used in contemporary classical music, the first composers to have used them as such are certainly Béla Bartók (Pizz Bartok, Jeux ponticello de cordes), Richard Strauss, who asked the horn player to sing in his instrument (Ein Heldenleben, 1899), Henry Cowell and his clusters (1911), and Edgar Varèse, who in Density 21.5 (1936) ordered the flutist to hit the keys.

== Bibliography ==
- 1967: sounds for woodwinds by Bruno Bartolozzi
- 1980: Flûtes au Présent by Pierre-Yves Artaud
- 1990: Saxologie by Daniel Kientzy
