= Gabriel Estarellas =

Spanish guitarist (born 1952)

Gabriel Estarellas (born Palma de Mallorca, 1952) is a classical Spanish guitarist, considered to be one of the best performers on his instrument. He began to play the guitar at the age of ten at the La Salle school in Palma. He has been a professor of guitar at the Madrid Royal Conservatory of Music and an honorary professor at the University of St Agustin de Arequipa, Peru.

Estarellas has taken part in important international music festivals, for example in Stresa, Paris, Santander, Pollensa, Alicante, Santiago de Compostela, "Andrés Segovia" in Madrid, Córdoba, Puerto Rico, Cuba and the Texas Music Festival. He has received numerous awards, including the Trujamán Award (2004), a prize at the Viotti International Competition in Vercelli, Italy, first prize at the Ramírez International Guitar Competition in Santiago de Compostela, and first prize in the Francisco Tárrega Contest in Benicassim.

He is one of the greatest exponents of contemporary music on his instrument. He has released more than 200 works, and has recorded 17 albums. He has promoted the works of contemporary composers, with the aim of expanding the classical guitar repertoire, and many of them have dedicated their guitar works to him. He has given recitals in various cities in Europe, Asia and America. In his concerts he regularly performs the works of different authors and styles, thus spreading new repertoires. His clear executions denote a formal logic, capable of bringing the listener closer to the musical essence of the compositions. He has written several compositions of his own, for example four Preludes (2004 and 2019), Ten Studies of Virtuosity (2001-2002), and Theme with Variations and Toccata (2019).

Estarellas has received the support of prominent composers over time, both from Spain and elsewhere. Spanish composers whose works he has performed include Luis de Pablo, Antón García Abril, Claudio Prieto, Valentín Ruiz, Gabriel Fernández Álvez, Xavier Benguerel and Manuel Moreno-Buendía. British composers include Stephen Dodgson, Tom Eastwood and Richard Stoker.
