= Stephen Dodgson =

British composer and broadcaster (1924–2013)

Stephen Cuthbert Vivian Dodgson (17 March 1924 – 13 April 2013) was a British composer and broadcaster. Dodgson's prolific musical output covered most genres, ranging from opera and large-scale orchestral music to chamber and instrumental music, as well as choral works and song. Three instruments to which he dedicated particular attention were the guitar, harpsichord and recorder. He wrote in a mainly tonal, although sometimes unconventional, idiom. Some of his works use unusual combinations of instruments.

== Biography ==
Stephen Dodgson was born in Chelsea, London in 1924, the third child of John Arthur Dodgson, who was a symbolist painter and nephew of Campbell Dodgson, and his wife, who was born Margaret Valentine Pease and also an artist. He was distant cousin of Lewis Carroll. He was educated at Berkhamsted School in Hertfordshire and at Stowe School in Buckinghamshire. In 1942, he was conscripted into the Royal Navy and took part in anti-submarine warfare escorting convoys in the Battle of the Atlantic.

On returning to London, he studied composition privately for a year with Bernard Stevens before enrolling at the Royal College of Music in 1946, officially to study the horn (under Frank Probyn), but in practice he was able to focus on composition under the guidance of R. O. Morris, Patrick Hadley and Antony Hopkins. While Morris instilled an interest in counterpoint and music from past centuries, such as that of the madrigalist Thomas Morley, Hadley and Hopkins provided more practical tuition.

Dodgson's early compositions won several prizes, including the Cobbett Competition for a Fantasy String Quartet (1948) and two Royal Philharmonic Society prizes: for his Variations for Orchestra (1949) and the Symphony in E Flat (1953). In 1949, he also won an Octavia travelling scholarship, which sent him to Rome. After returning to London in the spring of 1950, his music increasingly attracted performances and broadcasts by prominent players (including flautist Geoffrey Gilbert, oboist Evelyn Barbirolli, harpist Maria Korchinska, violinist Neville Marriner, violist Watson Forbes, the Philip Jones Brass Ensemble), and conductors such as Leslie Woodgate, Paul Steinitz and the composer Gerald Finzi. After initially making a living with teaching work in schools and colleges, in 1956 Dodgson was able to return to the Royal College of Music in a teaching capacity (where he also conducted the junior orchestra). In 1965 he was appointed professor of composition and music theory, a post he held until his retirement in 1982.

Two of the instruments which held special places in Dodgson's were the guitar and the harpsichord. His introduction to harpsichord writing came through one of the instrument's first twentieth-century exponents, the Czech player and musicologist, Stanislav Heller. In 1959, four years after writing his first pieces for the instrument he married Jane Clark, herself a harpsichordist and an authority on François Couperin. His wife fostered an increasing fascination with early and Baroque music.

He first came to write for the guitar—an instrument with which Dodgson is perhaps especially associated—in the early 1950s when Alexis Chesnakov, a Russian actor exiled in Britain, requested some folksong settings. Although Dodgson lacked any practical knowledge of the instrument, by the time of his Guitar Concerto No 1, completed in 1956, he had come to write for it idiomatically. This concerto was written for Julian Bream, but in his absence it was premiered by a 17-year-old John Williams (with the Royal Philharmonic Orchestra conducted by Walter Goehr), for whom he later wrote the Guitar Concerto No 2 (1972).

From 1957 onwards, he broadcast regularly on BBC Radio and wrote the music for many radio plays, often (from 1961 onwards) in friendly collaboration with the producer Raymond Raikes. In 1986 he became chairman of the National Youth Wind Orchestra of Great Britain, for which he wrote several pieces.

Recorder player John Turner remembers him as "Enthusiastic, ebullient and quick-witted... extremely voluble, with a strong, distinctive voice, an ever-present smile, much old-world courtesy, and an idiosyncratic gait."

Stephen Dodgson died on 13 April 2013, aged 89. He is said to have remained remarkably active until the last few months of his life.

== Music ==
Dodgson's musical output covers most genres, ranging from opera, large-scale orchestral music and wind-band works to chamber and instrumental music, along with choral works and song. He deployed an unusually wide variety of solo instruments. One of the few recent composers to write idiomatically for the harpsichord, clavichord and harp, he may be the first since the eighteenth century to have written for baryton trio. He wrote concertos for instruments ranging from the viola da gamba to the bass trombone. Three instruments to which he dedicated particular attention were the guitar, harpsichord and recorder, and one of his works, High Barbaree (1999), is actually scored for all three.

Guitarists who had works dedicated to them by Dodgson include Julian Bream, Gabriel Estarellas, Angelo Gilardino, Nicola Hall, John Williams, the Eden-Stell Duo and the Fragnito-Matarazzo Duo. In addition to a large number of solo works, among which are six virtuoso piano sonatas, this includes ensemble pieces and two concertos. Dodgson also composed duet concertos for two guitars and strings, and for violin, guitar and strings. His works for the guitar call on many different instrumental combinations, ranging from two, three and four guitars to use of massed guitars with and without accompaniments. His contribution to the core solo guitar repertoire includes four well-known partitas and a popular set of Fantasy-Divisions.

Dodgson's first work for harpsichord, a set of Six Inventions, was written in 1955. Influenced by his wife Jane's scholarly and practical interest in the history of the instrument, he produced a further four sets of Inventions for harpsichord, dating from 1961, 1970, 1985 and 1993, a series of 30 pieces that charts a musical course from the early twentieth-century metal-framed instruments to replicas of antique instruments, with the introduction of stylistic features derived from historically informed performance practice.

Dodgson's many contributions to the recorder repertoire include "Shine and Shade", a jazzy virtuoso piece from 1975, written for one of his students, the composer Richard Harvey. Material from Dodgson's incidental music for a 1970 BBC Radio production of a John Ford play, Perkin Warbeck, in which David Munrow had played the recorder enthusiastically, re-emerged in 1972 in a follow-up work called Warbeck Dances for recorder and harpsichord. His later works for the instrument include the Concerto Chacony (2000) with string orchestra, and a Capriccio Concertante No. 2 (2005) for the unusual combination of recorder, harpsichord and string orchestra.

Dodgson loved the theatre and wrote both for the stage and for many BBC drama productions (see Incidental music). His one full-scale opera, Margaret Catchpole – Two Worlds Apart, is in four acts and features a heroine who has been dubbed a "female Dick Turpin". His two chamber operas, the farcical Cadilly and Nancy the Waterman, were first performed with puppets (at the Purcell Room in 1969) and have also been fully staged (in St Albans in 2002 and 2007).

His music for wind band includes a four-movement Wind Symphony (1974). His orchestral output features a set of nine Essays for orchestra (five of which were recorded on a Dutton CD by the Royal Scottish National Orchestra under David Lloyd Jones), each lasting around a quarter of an hour, in which Dodgson says he aimed "to treat the orchestra boldly, as an integrated body and with ideas concentrated and unified more than contrasted", in keeping with Francis Bacon's conception of the essay as "dispersed meditations". Other commercial recordings of cycles of Dodgson's works include the seven piano sonatas played by Bernard Roberts and the eight string quartets performed by the Tippett String Quartet. His three sets of Bush Ballads, songs setting texts by Australian poets and Australian folk verses, are included on the three CD's of songs issued by the SOMMM label.

== Style ==
In The Oxford Companion to Music, Paul Griffiths notes that Dodgson "proved adept at producing likable, well-crafted music to order, often for unusual chamber ensembles". The critic Guy Rickards has summarized his style as follows: "Dodgson's music is written mostly in an agreeable if occasionally challenging modern tonal idiom, cosmopolitan rather than overtly British in style, influenced by early and Baroque music and Janáček as much as English pastoralism... His mature style was one of refinement, sitting somewhere between post-Romanticism and neo-classicism, but individual works often had quirky, even spectral sides to them."

== Selected works ==
Note: For more extensive listings of works by this prolific composer, see Mackenzie (2006).

=== Opera ===
- Cadilly (1969)
- Nancy the Waterman (1969)
- Margaret Catchpole (1979)

=== Choral ===
- Te Deum, for soprano, tenor, bass, chorus, organ and orchestra (1972)
- Magnificat, for soprano, mezzo-soprano, tenor, bass, chorus and orchestra (1974)

=== Song ===
- Irishry (four poems of Joseph Campbell, 1949)
- Tideways (four poems of Ezra Pound, 1950)
- Four Poems of John Clare (1961)
- Bush Ballads (first series, 1974)
- Bush Ballads (second series, 1998)
- Bush Ballads (third series, 2003)

=== Orchestral ===
- Concerto No. 1 for Guitar and Orchestra (1956)
- Russian Pieces for orchestra (1957)
- Villanelle (1960)
- Concerto for Viola da gamba and Chamber Orchestra (1961)
- The Mikado (overture) (1962)
- Concerto for Bassoon and Chamber Orchestra (1969)
- Concerto No. 2 for Guitar and Orchestra (1972)
- Last of the Leaves, for bass, clarinet and strings (1975)
- Essay No. 1 (1980)
- Essay No. 2 (1981)
- Essay No. 3 (1982)
- Essay No. 4 (1984)
- Essay No. 5 (1985)
- Symphony in One Movement (1988)
- Sinfonia "Troia-Nova"
- Duo Concerto for Violin, Guitar and Strings (1990)
- Concerto for Flute and Strings (1991)
- Concertino for 2 Guitars and Strings "Les Dentelles" (1998)
- Concerto for Bass Trombone and Orchestra (1985)
- Essay No. 6 (1991)
- Essay No. 7, for string orchestra (1992)
- The Rising of Job (1998)
- Essay No. 8 (2000)
- Essay No. 9

=== Incidental music ===
- The Beaux' Stratagem by George Farquhar (1961)
- Love for Love by William Congreve (1965)
- The Legacy by Pierre de Marivaux (1965)
- The Old Bachelor by Congreve (1966)
- Mostellaria ("The Ghost of a Play") by Plautus (1969)
- Perkin Warbeck by John Ford (1970)
- Henry VI by William Shakespeare, in two parts (1970)
- Le Morte d'Arthur by Thomas Malory (1970)
- Women in Power by Aristophanes, translated by Patric Dickinson (1970)
- Macbeth by Shakespeare (1971)
- Sir Gawain and the Green Knight (1971)
- The Silent Woman by Ben Jonson (1974)
- The London Cuckolds by Edward Ravenscroft (1974)

=== Wind band ===
- Wind Symphony (1974)
- The Eagle, a tone poem (1976)
- Matelot: a Diversion for Wind Band (1977)
- Capriccio Concertante for clarinet and wind orchestra (1984)
- Arlington Concertante (1986)
- Bandwagon (1991)
- Marchrider (1990)
- Flowers of London Town, a symphonic sequence after William Blake (1990)

=== Guitar ensemble ===
- Personent Hodie (1981)
- Divertissement (1983) for violin and guitar ensemble
- Hymnus de Sancto Stephano (1983) for soprano and guitar ensemble
- The Selevan Story (1992) for flute, violin, guitar duo and guitar ensemble
- Watersmeet (2002)

=== Chamber ===
- Sonata for viola and piano (1952)
- Pastoral Sonata for flute, cello and guitar (1953; rev. 1959 & 1998)
- Suite for brass septet (1957)
- Duo for flute and harp (1958)
- Four Poems of John Clare for voice and guitar (1962)
- Sonata for brass quintet (1963)
- Four Fancies for viola and piano (1964)
- String Trio No. 2 (1964)
- Piano Trio No. 1 (1967)
- Duo Concertante for guitar and harpsichord (1968)
- Suite in D for oboe and harpsichord (1972)
- Piano Trio No. 2 (1973)
- Quintet for guitar and string quartet (1973)
- Duo for cello and guitar (1974)
- Shine and Shade for recorder and harpsichord/piano (1975)
- Dialogues for guitar and harpsichord (1976)
- Bagatelles for four clarinets (1977)
- London Lyrics for voice and guitar (1977)
- Caprice after Puck for viola solo (1978)
- Circus Pony (1978)
- Follow the Star for three guitars (1979)
- Capriccio for flute and guitar (1980)
- Quatre rondeaux de Charles d'Orléans for soprano and harpsichord (1982)
- Sonata for Three for flute, viola and guitar (1982)
- In Search of Folly for flute and guitar (1986)
- Fantasia for Six Brass (1987)
- Promenade I for two guitars (1988)
- Pastourelle for two guitars (1992)
- Riversong for two guitars (1994)
- Five Penny Pieces (1995)
- Daphne to Apollo for voice and guitar (1997)
- Echoes of Autumn for viola and guitar (1998)
- High Barbaree for recorder, guitar and harpsichord (1999)
- Piano Trio No. 3 (2000)
- Venus to the Muses for soprano, recorder, bassoon and harpsichord (2002)
- Warbeck Trio for recorder, bassoon and harpsichord (2002)

=== Solo guitar ===
- Partita No. 1 (1963)
- Studies (1965)
- Fantasy-Divisions (1969)
- Partita No. 2 (1976)
- Legend (1977)
- Merlin (1978)
- Etude-Caprice (1980)
- Partita No. 3 (1981)
- Stemma (1988)
- Three Attic Dances (1989)
- Partita No. 4 (1990)
- The Midst of Life (1994)

=== Piano ===
- Sonata for piano duet (1949)
- Tournament for Twenty Fingers, vols. 1 and 2 for piano duet (1952, 1954)
- Eight Fanciful Pieces (1956)
- Piano Sonata No. 1 (1959)
- Three Impromptus (1962, revised 1985)
- Four Moods of the Wind (1968)
- Piano Sonata No. 2 (1975)
- Piano Sonata No. 3 (1983)
- Piano Sonata No. 4 (1987)
- Piano Sonata No. 5 (1992)
- Piano Sonata No. 6 (1994)
- Piano Sonata No. 7 (2003)

=== Other solo instrument ===
- Inventions for harpsichord (1955)
- The Faery Beam Upon You for alto flute (1994)
- Bagatelles for Piano (1998)
- Cor Leonis for solo French horn (1990)
