= Reginald Smith Brindle =

British composer (1917–2003)

- Born: Reginald Smith Brindle; 5 January 1917; Cuerdon, Lancashire, UK
- Died: 9 September 2003 (aged 86)
- Occupations: Composer and writer

Reginald Smith Brindle (5 January 1917 – 9 September 2003) was a British composer and writer.

== Early life ==
Smith Brindle was born in Cuerdon, Lancashire, to Robert and Jane Smith Brindle. He began learning the piano at the age of six, and later took up the clarinet, saxophone and guitar (and won a Melody Maker prize for his guitar-playing). Under pressure from his parents, he began to study architecture. At the time, he was interested in jazz, and played saxophone professionally for a while alongside his studies. On attending an organ recital at Chester Cathedral in 1937, however, he was inspired to take up both the organ and composition. He spent most of World War II serving in Africa and Italy as a captain in the Corps of Royal Engineers. It was during this period that he rekindled his interest in the guitar, an instrument for which he wrote an enormous amount of music.

== Career ==
After the war, Smith Brindle returned to composition. He submitted a Fantasia Passacaglia (1946) for an Italian composition competition, and won first prize. From 1946 to 1949 he studied music at the University College of North Wales in Bangor. He went to Italy in 1949 to continue his studies. There his teachers included Ildebrando Pizzetti and Luigi Dallapiccola for composition and Fernando Germani for organ.

His compositional activity comprised three main phases: tonal until 1951; serial/"dodecaphonic" until c1970; and finally a freer third phase where many compositions were for his own instruments, guitar and organ.

Brindle is presently best known for his solo guitar music (which was highly regarded by players such as Andres Segovia and Julian Bream, especially El Polifemo de Oro (1956), written for Bream, as well as five sonatas (1948, 1976, 1978, 1979), Variants on two themes of J. S. Bach (1970), Memento in two movements (1973), Do not go gentle... (1974), November Memories (1974), Four Poems of Garcia Lorca (1975), "Guitarcosmos" (3 volumes) and The Prince of Venosa (1994).

His chamber opera The Death of Antigone, was premiered at Oxford in 1971, and later broadcast in May 1976. Notable orchestral works include two symphonies (1955 and 1989), Apocalypse (1970), Creation Epic (world premiere at the Proms on 5 August 1964), Homage to H.G. Wells (1960), the Renaissance Suite (1956), Symphonic Variations (1957), and Via Crucis for strings (1966).

Smith Brindle taught from 1957 to 1970 at the University College of North Wales in Bangor, and from 1970 to 1981 at the University of Surrey. During his time at Surrey, he founded the prestigious Tonmeister course in Music and Sound Recording.} He continued to compose until 1998, being involved with the Chameleon group of composers in 1990s Croydon.

Smith Brindle was an expert on the music of 20th-century Italian composers such as Luigi Dallapiccola, Ildebrando Pizzetti and Bruno Bartolozzi (he studied with all three). He also wrote the technical book Serial Composition (1966). He played many instruments, but was particularly fond of the guitar, organ and saxophone.

== Personal life ==
Smith Brindle met Giulia Borsi in Italy during the war, and they were married in Britain in 1947. Together they had one son and three daughters.

== Legacy ==
Smith Brindle's papers are preserved in the University Library Special Collections and Archives at California State University, Northridge.

== Books ==
- Serial Composition. Oxford University Press. 1966. ISBN 978-0-19-311906-2.
- Contemporary Percussion. Oxford University Press. 1970. ISBN 978-0-19-816247-6.
- The New Music: The Avant-garde since 1945. Oxford University Press. 1975. ISBN 978-0-19-315468-1. Second edition 1987. ISBN 978-0-19-315471-1 (cloth); ISBN 978-0-19-315468-1 (pbk).
- Musical Composition. Oxford University Press. 1986. ISBN 978-0-19-317107-7.
