= Matteo Carcassi =

Italian guitarist (1796–1853)

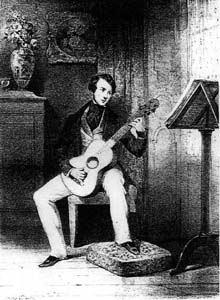
- Born: 8 April 1792; Florence, Italy
- Died: 16 January 1853 (aged 60); Paris, France
- Occupations: guitarist, teacher, composer
- Years active: 1810 - 1840

Matteo Carcassi (8 April 1792 – 16 January 1853) was an Italian guitarist, teacher and composer.

== Biography ==
Carcassi was born in Florence, Italy, and first studied the piano, but learned guitar when still a child. He quickly gained a reputation as a virtuoso concert guitarist before the age of twenty.

Around 1810, he moved to Germany gaining almost immediate success. From 1811, he may have served as a musician in the French army during the Napoleonic Wars until 1815. By 1815, he had settled in Paris, where he earned his living as a teacher of both the piano and the guitar.

On a concert tour in Germany in 1819, he met his friend Jean-Antoine Meissonnier for the first time. Also a well-known guitarist, Meissonnier published many of Carcassi's works in his Paris publishing house. For Meissonnier, he also arranged a number of popular songs for guitar that were originally written for piano, including works by Théodore Labarre and Loïsa Puget.

From 1820 onward, Carcassi spent the majority of his time in Paris. In 1823, he performed an extremely successful series of concerts in London that earned him great fame, both as a performing artist and as a teacher. However, in Paris, a long time passed before his talents were truly recognized, partly because of the presence of Ferdinando Carulli.

Carcassi was in Germany again during the autumn of 1824. Afterwards he performed in London, where his reputation now gave him access to more prestigious concert halls. Finally he returned to Paris. For several years, he made concert trips from here to the important musical centres of Europe. After a short return to performing in 1836, he quit his concert practice around 1840 and died in Paris in 1853.

== Music ==
Carcassi wrote a method for guitar (Op. 59), first published with Schott in Mainz in 1836, which is still valuable, relevant and interesting. He even wrote at the close of the preface: "I can assert that any intelligent person who will attentively study this book from beginning to end will acquire a perfect knowledge of the mechanism of the guitar."

His most famous works are collected in his 25 Études, Op. 60. In these, he managed to blend technical skills with brilliant Romantic music. This is the reason his music is still played by many classical guitarists today.
