= Lior Navok =

Israeli composer, conductor, and pianist (born 1971)

- ליאור נבוק
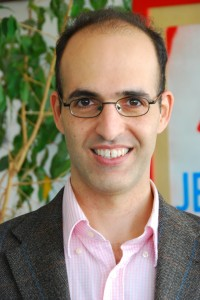
- Born: 6 September 1971 (age 55); Tel Aviv
- Occupations: Classical composer Pianist; Conductor

Lior Navok (Hebrew: ליאור נבוק; born September 6, 1971) is an Israeli classical composer, conductor and pianist. He was born in Tel Aviv. Navok studied composition privately with the Israeli composer Moshe Zorman, and completed a Bachelor's degree at the Jerusalem Academy of Music and Dance, where he studied composition (with Yinam Leef) and conducting. He later completed he studied for a Master's and Doctorate at the New England Conservatory, where he studied with John Harbison.

His music has been performed internationally by orchestras and ensembles including the Oper Frankfurt, Nuernberg Opera, Israel Philharmonic Orchestra, Boston Modern Orchestra Project, and the Tanglewood Festival Orchestra. Amongst the awards he has received are those from the Israel Cultural Excellence Foundation and the Massachusetts Cultural Council. He has also received awards from the Fromm Music Foundation, Lili Boulanger Memorial Fund Award, and Israel Prime Minister Award. In 2004, he was one of seven composers awarded commissions for new musical works by the Serge Koussevitzky Foundation in the Library of Congress and the Koussevitzky Music Foundation.

His stage music includes two operas, The Bet, based on a short story by Anton Chekhov, and An unserem Fluss (By Our River). The latter was commissioned by Oper Frankfurt, and was premiered during the company's 2014/15 season. He has also written three stage works for children: The Little Mermaid (based in the story by Hans Christian Andersen); The Adventures of Pinocchio (based on the children's novel by Carlo Collodi); and Brave Little Timmy (inspired in part by Prokofiev's Peter and the Wolf), which served as the starting point for his Hebrew children's book of the same title, published in 2023. His oratorio reflecting on The Holocaust, And The Trains Kept Coming…, was commissioned by Boston's Cantata Singers and premiered in 2008.

Navok is the pianist and founding member of the Butterfly Effect Ensemble.

== Style and Aesthetics ==
Lior Navok’s musical language employs modality and expanded tonality, avoiding serial techniques and mathematically-predetermined pitch sets. The composer has stated that he aims to address non-specialist listeners. His music is often inspired by events and phenomena he encounters in life, and seeks out sounds that would evoke these phenomena and the feelings and sensations they create within him. To achieve these aims, he does avail himself to innovative, even avant-garde, sonorities, techniques and effects, though these rarely govern an entire work. His music has been described “developing[ing] into an emotional experience rather than an intellectual one”. Within these broad parameters, his music covers a wide range, in terms of scoring, influences and expression alike. Michael McDonagh’s referred to “echoes [of] Debussy and especially Ravel” in Navok’s music, especially in his relatively early works, such V5 and the Quartet for flute, clarinet, bassoon and harp. An emphasis on instrumental colour and special timbral effects can be sensed in meditative, nature-inspired works like Mysterious Pond, Veiled Echoes; in the composer's first full orchestral work, First Fruits and in first movement of the raga-inspired first quartet, Voices from India.

Another notable early influence is jazz music: Navok started his musical career as a jazz musician, and this influence can be sensed, for instance, in his 1996 Clarinet Concerto, a work which also reveals the composer’s rhythmic impulses. Other examples include the third movement of string quartet Voices from India, Six Short Stories for Woodwind Quintet, the Saxophone Quartet and others.

Several of the composer’s later works draw inspiration from socio-political issues, such as the Israeli-Arab conflict or religious struggles. A recent example is Blue, Yellow, Smoke for chamber orchestra, composed in the wake of Russia’s invasion of Ukraine. These works tend to have a darker expression (e.g, Elegy to the Future) and sometimes acquire an expressionistic style, as in String Quartet No. 2 – Hope Cycles.

Navok’s interest in socio-political issues topics can also be sensed in some of his theatrical works, such as An unserem Fluss. His oratorio And the Trains Kept Coming: Slavery Document No. 3 directly tackles the issue of the Allies’ role during the Holocaust, using a libretto based on official documents from the period.

Another major facet of Navok’s dramatic muse is his music for children – e.g., The Little Mermaid for narrator and chamber orchestra (2006), and the musical stories The Adventures of Pinocchio (2009) and Brave Little Timmy (2019). This latter work is based on Navok’s own libretto – a variation on Prokofiev’s Peter and the Wolf in which the child protagonist befriends the wolf rather than capturing him. This work served as the basis for Navok’s first children’s book, published in Hebrew in 2023.

His more intimate vocal works are written for ensembles ranging from standard Lieder scoring (single voice and piano), through more unusual combinations (e.g., soprano and percussion in the semi-theatrical Dialogues), to voice and orchestra, setting texts in various languages and traditions, including Biblical texts in the original Hebrew; Israeli poets Leah Goldberg, Dan Pagis and others; Emily Dickinson, Antonio Machado, and others.

Navok also composed several works for solo piano – including several cycles of semi-programmatic miniatures (e.g., The Old Photo Box), whose movements can be interpreted both as independent works and as parts of a larger whole. As a pianist-composer, Navok created four solo works through the process of real-time composition – i.e., the creation of musical works by the performer-composer, combining partially pre-determined shapes and materials with a degree of improvisatory freedom, without musical notation. The resulting compositions – Urban Nocturnes, Inner Landscapes, From the Log of a Longing Captain and Time Junctions – were released as audio recordings.

Navok applies similar real-time-composition techniques in his collaborative work with Stephen Hornstein and Jeffrey Kowalsky. Together, these three musicians form the Butterfly Effect Ensemble, which specializes in creating live scores for silent films from the early days of the cinema up to 1929.

== Compositions ==
=== Stage music ===
- An unserem Fluss (By our River) (2013) -- c. 93' -- Chamber opera in two acts; Text by the composer.
- The Adventures of Pinocchio (2009) -- c. 62' -- for 3 actors / flute, oboe, clarinet, horn, bassoon and piano
- Beauty and the Beast (2009) -- c. 30' -- for actress / string quartet, double bass and piano
- The Bet (2012) -- c. 90' -- Chamber opera in 14 scenes; after a short story by Anton Chekhov
- Brave Little Timmy (2019) -- c. 28' – for narrator and orchestra; Libretto by the composer
- Gitz & Spitz (2020) -- c. 50' – for narrator and ensemble; Libretto by the composer
- The Little Mermaid (2007) -- c. 36' -- for actor / narrator; 2 pianos; flute, clarinet, percussion and string quintet (or string orchestra)

=== Symphonic ===
- And the Trains Kept Coming... -- (2007) c. 44' -- oratorio for tenor, bass-baritone, boy-soprano, chorus and orchestra
- Aurora Borealis -- (2007) c. 12' -- for accordion, harp, percussion and strings
- Between Two Coasts -- (2009) c. 14' -- for string orchestra
- Blue, Yellow, Smoke -- (2022) c. 10' -- for chamber orchestra
- Clarinet Concerto -- (1996) c. 22' -- for Clarinet Solo; 2 flutes (2nd doubles piccolo); 2 oboes; 2 bassoons; 2 horns; 2 trumpets; 2 Percussion; Strings
- First-Fruits - a Symphonic Prelude -- (1997) c. 12' -- for Symphony Orchestra
- ...of weaving the shadowed waves -- (2003) c. 7.5' -- for two marimbas and chamber orchestra
- Symphonic Bagatelles -- (2000) c. 18' -- for symphony orchestra
- The Spanish Songs -- (1998) c. 11'-- for soprano, bassoon and chamber orchestra

=== Wind ensemble ===
- Gleams from the Bosom of Darkness -- (2002) c. 21' -- for choir and symphonic band
- Loose Caboose -- (2020) c. 9' -- for symphonic band
- Tetris -- (2009) c. 18' -- for double wind quintet, 2 flutes, 2 oboes, 2 clarinets, 2 horns and 2 bassoons

=== Choral music ===
- It Is Winter That We Dream Of Spring -- (1997) c. 4' -- for mixed chamber chorus
- Meditations Over Shore -- (1997) c. 4' -- for soli quartet, double chamber chorus, double large chorus, harmonica, percussion (2) and piano
- Nocturne -- (1999) c. 9' -- for 12 singers (SATB), soprano saxophone, clarinet, harp guitar and percussion
- Three songs—for mixed chamber chorus -- (1994) c. 20' mixed chamber chorus

=== Vocal music ===
- A Dome of Many-Coloured Glass -- (2002) c. 10' -- for tenor and piano
- A'l Mishcavi Baleylot (Upon my bed by night) -- (1992) c. 5' -- for soprano and harp
- Bestiarius -- (1995) c. 11' -- for alto/mezzo-soprano solo, flute/piccolo, clarinet, bassoon; violin, percussion (2) and harpsichord
- Copenhagen Songs -- (2010) c. 7' -- for alto and piano
- End-of-the-Day Songs -- (2018) c. 12' -- for baritone and piano
- Found in a Train Station -- (2007) c. 12' -- for soprano, mandolin, violin, cello and piano
- The Sea of Sunset -- (1997) c. 7' -- for soprano, trombone, double bass and piano
- The Spanish Songs -- (1998/2023) c. 11'-- for soprano, bassoon and piano (piano version)
- Spring Calls -- (2006) c. 10' -- for soprano, flute, viola, cello and harp
- Three songs -- (1995) c. 10' -- for soprano and piano

=== Chamber music ===
- After a tango -- (1995) c. 16' -- for recorders (3), clarinet, trumpet, trombone, guitar, Percussion, violin, double bass
- At the Edge of a Spiral -- (2004) c. 10' -- for one piano, four hands
- Arabesque -- (2005) c. 10' -- for alto recorder, baroque cello and harpsichord
- Blurred Formations -- (2002) c. 5' -- for guitar and accordion
- Capriccio -- (2002) c. 10' -- for flute and violin
- Dripping Minutes - Frozen Years -- (2017) c. 11' -- for bassoon and piano
- Elegy to the Future -- (2001) c. 13' -- for piccolo/alto flute; clarinet; violin; cello; percussion; piano
- Ex Silentium (From the Silence) -- (2018) c. 9' -- for viola and piano
- Flashes of decay (1996) -- (1996) c. 12' -- for flute/piccolo; English horn; clarinet/bass clarinet; horn; tuba; percussion (2); harp; piano
- Fluctuations -- (2017) c. 10' -- for viola and piano
- Fuzzy -- (2018) c. 10' -- for oboe and piano
- Gitz & Spitz Suite -- (2020) c. 19' -- for trumpets (2); horn; trombone and tuba
- Hidden Reflections -- (1996) c. 15' -- for alto saxophone and piano or clarinet and piano
- Hope Cycles (String Quartet no.2) -- (2004) c. 24' -- for string quartet
- Humoresque -- (1995) c. 5' -- for clarinet and piano
- Like a Whirling Sand Clock -- (2006) c. 10' -- for clarinet, cello and piano
- Little Suite -- (2006) c. 12' -- for clarinet, violin, viola and cello
- Mysterious Pond -- (2004) c. 10' -- for flute, oboe and piano
- Piano Quintet -- (2000) c. 18' -- for violins (2), viola, cello and piano
- Piano Trio -- (1999) c. 22' -- for violin, cello and piano
- Quartet for flute, clarinet bassoon and harp -- (1994) c. 27'
- Samsara -- (2023) c. 11' -- for trombone and piano
- Sarigim -- (2020) c. 6' -- for guitar duo
- Saxophone Quartet -- (1999) c. 10' -- for soprano, alto, tenor and baritone saxophones
- Sextet -- (1998) c. 22' -- for flute/ piccolo/ bass flute; clarinet/ bass clarinet; violin; cello; Percussion.; Piano
- Six short stories for Woodwind Quintet -- (1996) 12' -- for flute/piccolo; oboe; clarinet; horn; bassoon
- Signals -- (2017) 11' -- for percussion quartet and piano/celeste
- Soliloquy (String Quartet no.4) -- (2017) c. 16' -- for string quartet
- Three Episodes for Chamber Ensemble -- (1997) c. 12' -- for flute; oboe; clarinet; bassoon; horn; percussion (1); piano; violin; viola; cello and double bass
- Three Winged Movements -- (2003) 12' -- for flute and piano
- Trio for Clarinet, Bassoon and Horn -- (2001) c. 5' -- for clarinet, bassoon and horn
- V5 - Quintet for Vibraphone and String Quartet -- (1995) c. 16' -- for vibraphone; violins (2); viola; cello
- Veiled Echoes -- (2000) c. 15' -- for flute, viola and harp
- Violin Sonata -- (2004) c. 18' -- for violin and piano duo
- Voices from India (String Quartet no.1) -- (1997) c. 17' -- for violins (2); viola; cello
- Whispered Questions (String Quartet no.3) -- (2010) c. 17' -- for string quartet

=== Electroacoustic music ===
- Through the Alleys of Time -- (2007) c. 22' -- for guitar and tape

=== Keyboard music ===
- Periscopes -- (2009) c. 30' -- for solo piano
- Silent Streets -- (2020) c. 8' -- for solo piano
- Shimmer -- (2017) c. 12' -- for solo piano
- Ten Bagatelles -- (2000) c. 18' -- for solo piano
- The Old Photo Box -- (2006) c. 58' -- for solo piano
- Visions -- (2018) c. 15' -- for solo piano
- The Waiting Hours -- (2023) c. 14' -- for solo piano

=== Solo music ===
- Big Mouse -- (2020) c. 4' -- for solo Double Bass
- Dunes -- (2005) c. 5' -- for solo flute
- East of the Cane Fields -- (2001) c. 8' -- for solo harp
- Fantasy -- (1998) c. 5' -- for solo cello
- Klotz -- (2019) c. 5' -- for solo cello
- In Memoriam -- (2023) c. 4' -- for solo violin or viola
- Remembrances of Jerusalem -- (1995) c. 11' -- for solo guitar
- Rosewood Staircase -- (2000) c. 6' -- for solo marimba
- Six for a Dance -- (2000) c. 3' -- for solo guitar
- Six pieces for horn solo -- (1995) c. 15' -- for solo French horn

=== Discography ===
- Hidden Reflections (1996)
- Meditations Over Shore (2001)
- The Old Photo Box (2008)
- The Natives are Restless (with Butterfly Effect Ensemble) (2010)
- Urban Nocturnes (2011)
- Music and Poetry – face to face (With D. Nurkse) (2011)
- Chimera (with Butterfly Effect Ensemble) (2013)
- Inner Landscapes (2022)
- From the Log of a Longing Captain (2023)
- Time Junctions (2023)
- Rituals (with Butterfly Effect Ensemble) (2014/2023)
