= 25 Studies for guitar (Carcassi) =

Classical guitar pieces by Matteo Carcassi

25 Studies, Op. 60 is a set of etudes for the classical guitar, written by Matteo Carcassi. The etudes serve as a bridge between the elementary and advanced intermediate stages of the discipline, and are based on simple harmonic structures. They contain many of the fundamental elements upon which guitar technique rests, for example, arpeggios, slurs, barres, etc. Each study attends to the treatment of a particular technical challenge. The etudes also accustom a pupil to various tempos and the various positions on the guitar.
