= René Eespere =

Estonian composer

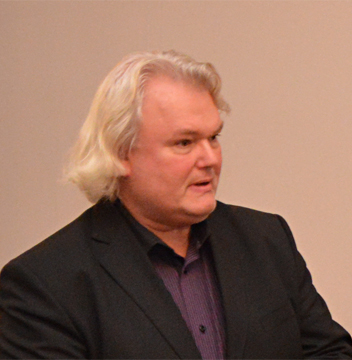
René Eespere

René Eespere (born 14 December 1953 in Tallinn) is an Estonian composer. His best-regarded works are Glorificatio (1990) and Two Jubilations (1995), both written for mixed chorus. Other works include Concerto Ritornello for Chamber Orchestra (1982/1993), Concerto for Flute and Chamber Orchestra (1995/98), and Concerto for Viola and Chamber Orchestra (1996/98).
