= Giles Swayne =

British composer

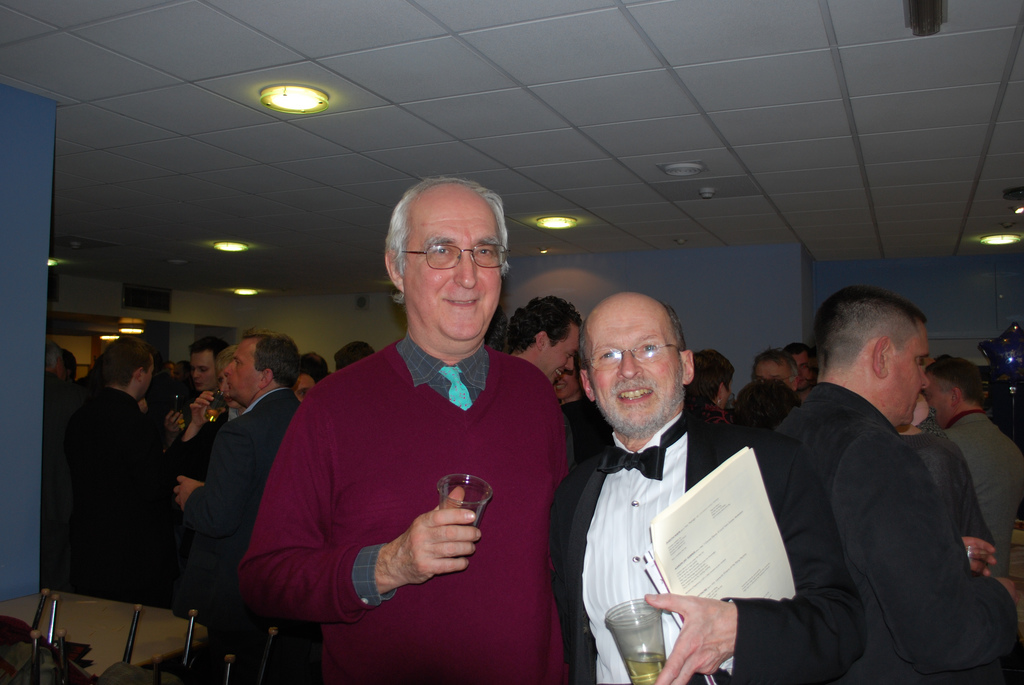
Giles Swayne and Philip Brunelle.

Giles Oliver Cairnes Swayne (born 30 June 1946 in Hertfordshire) is a British composer.

== Biography ==
Swayne spent much of his childhood in Liverpool, and began composing at a young age. He was educated at Ampleforth College and at Cambridge University, where he worked with Raymond Leppard and Nicholas Maw before spending three years at the Royal Academy of Music as a student of Harrison Birtwistle, Alan Bush and, once again, Maw. During the years 1976 to 1977 he attended several of Olivier Messiaen's classes at the Paris Conservatoire and from 1981 to 1982 made a study visit to the Gambia and southern Senegal – a formative experience he put to creative use as composer-in-residence to the London borough of Hounslow, 1980–83. Together with his second wife, the Ghanaian, Naaotwa Codjoe, he lived in a village near Accra, Ghana, from 1990 to 1996. Swayne is a cousin of Elizabeth Maconchy and Nicola LeFanu. He married violinist Malu Lin in 2002.

== Selected compositions ==
- CRY, opus 27 for 28 solo voices and electronics, commissioned by the BBC and premiered in 1980 (recorded on the label NMC by the BBC Singers conducted by John Poole)
- Magnificat, 1982
- String Quartets 1 – 3 (1971 to 1993)
- Goodnight Sweet Ladies for soprano and piano, commissioned by Lord Harewood and written 1994–5 ()
- The Silent Land, for cello and choir, premiered in 1998
- HAVOC, for accompanied choir – a sequel to CRY; premiered 1999
- Riff-Raff for organ, premiered in 1983 by Andrew Parnell
- Le Nozze di Cherubino (opera, premiere 22 January 1985 London)
- Starlight (a Christmas carol)
