= Denis Dufour =

French composer

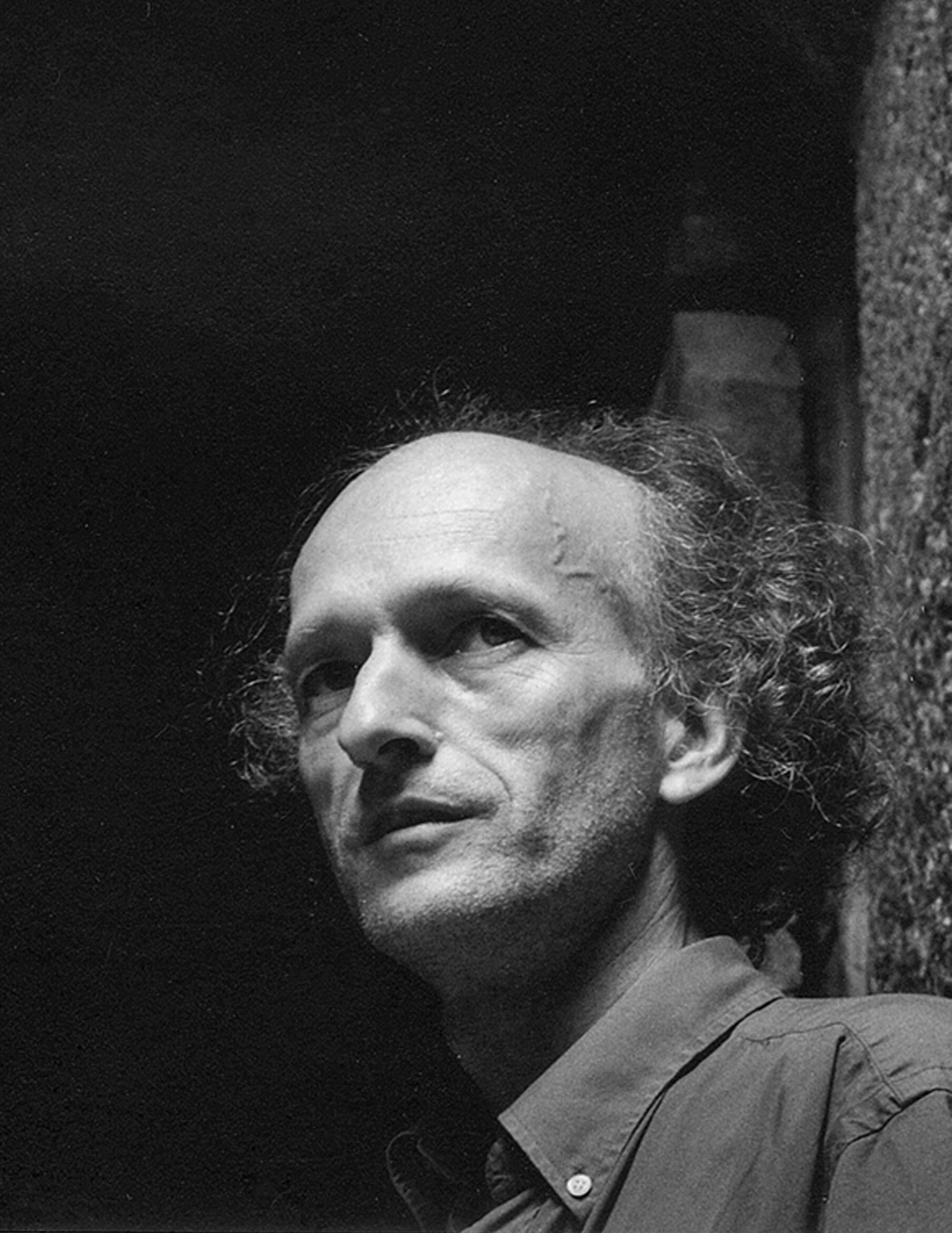
- Dufour during the Futura Festival in 2000, Crest, France
- Born: 9 October 1953 (age 72); Lyon, France
- Education: Paris Conservatory
- Occupations: Composer, Music Educator and Artistic Director
- Known for: Acousmatic Art (invented the term), Futura Festival, Motus
- Notable work: Notre besoin de consolation est impossible à rassasier, Bocalises
- Style: Perceptive morphology
- Awards: SACEM award for best Contemporary Electroacoustic Composition in 2009; Claude Arrieu Award (SACEM) for his compositional contribution in the region in 1993; Hervé Dugardin Prize (SACEM) in 1981; First prize at the Luigi Russolo International Competition for Composition in 1979
- Website: Denis Dufour

Denis Dufour (born 9 October 1953) is a composer of art music.

== Works ==
Year	Name of work	Medium type	Instrumentation	Length	Opus	Remarks
2021	Zwei kurze Stücke	acousmatic	stereophonic acousmonium/loudspeakers	14.14	op.191	
2020	Air	acousmatic	stereophonic acousmonium/loudspeakers	09.09	op.190	text by Thomas Brando, from the cycle Les Acousmalides
2019	Missa pro pueris	acousmatic	stereophonic acousmonium/loudspeakers	47.47	op.189	text by Thomas Brando
2019	Touché par l'air	mixed/solo	voice and stereophonic acousmonium/loudspeakers	11.11	op.188	text by Thomas Brando, dedicated to Hém-Ish
2019	Spot 4	instrumental/solo	piano four hands	04.00	op.187	dedicated to Jacques Raynaut and Ludovic Selmi
2019	Abschied und Lebewohl	instrumental/solo	piano	02.10	op.186	dedicated to Karlheinz Roschitz
2019	Koley Bāzār	acousmatic	stereophonic acousmonium/loudspeakers	08.08	op.185	
2018	Amor Niger L.	mixed/solo	voice and stereophonic acousmonium/loudspeakers	06.30	op.184	text by Thomas Brando, from the cycle Le Livre des désordres
2018	BlindPoint	acousmatic	stereophonic acousmonium/loudspeakers	30.30	op.183	
2017	Les Cris de Tatibagan	acousmatic	stereophonic acousmonium/loudspeakers	115.00	op.182	
2016	Tapovan	acousmatic	stereophonic acousmonium/loudspeakers	18.18	op.181	text by Thomas Brando, dedicated to Tomonari Higaki
2016	Anamorphose	acousmatic	stereophonic acousmonium/loudspeakers	10.10	op.180	
2016	Origine	acousmatic	stereophonic acousmonium/loudspeakers	17.50	op.179	dedicated to Dieter Kaufmann
2016	In-quarto	instrumental/ensemble	2 violins, viola and violoncello	21.00	op.178	from the cycle Fantaisies romantiques et baroques/Plis de perversion
2015	Chambre 44	mixed/ensemble	flute, alto saxophone, percussion, piano and stereophonic acousmonium/loudspeakers	10.30	op.177	
2015	Túngara	mixed/solo	marimba and stereophonic acousmonium/loudspeakers	06.30	op.176	from the cycle Fantaisies romantiques et baroques/Marais, dedicated to Philippe Spiesser
2015	Sprint	instrumental/ensemble	flute, percussion, violin, violoncello and contrabass	11.00	op.175	from the cycle Le Livre des désordres
2014	Si tendre, si funeste	acousmatic	stereophonic acousmonium/loudspeakers	05.17	op.174	hommage to Marguerite Duras
2014	Les Fleurs enchantées	mixed/ensemble	3 flutes and stereophonic acousmonium/loudspeakers	12.00	op.173	
2014	Fluorescence	instrumental/ensemble	4 flutes	13.00	op.172	hommage to Jean-Philippe Rameau
2014	Spot	instrumental/solo	piano	03.30	op.171	from the cycle Fantaisies romantiques et baroques/Délicieux danger, dedicated to Nicolas Horvath
2013	Blue Rocket on a Rocky Shore	acousmatic	stereophonic acousmonium/loudspeakers	31.31	op.170	text by Thomas Brando
2013	Stèle pour Pierre Schaeffer	instrumental/ensemble	flute, bass clarinet, alto saxophone, trumpet and violoncello	05.00	op.169	from the cycle Fantaisies romantiques et baroques/Délicieux danger
2013	Dernier quatuor	instrumental/ensemble	2 violins, viola and violoncello	15.00	op.168	
2013	Aristée et Eurydice	acousmatic	stereophonic acousmonium/loudspeakers	04.00	op.167	
2013	Quatuor “les héros anonymes”	mixed/ensemble	flute, oboe, viola, contrabass and stereophonic acousmonium/loudspeakers	10.43	op.166	
2013	Cinq formes d'appel	instrumental/ensemble	trumpet and bass clarinet	09.00	op.165	
2013	In Paradisum	acousmatic	stereophonic acousmonium/loudspeakers	06.40	op.164	
2012	Post mortem (Et puis paf !)	mixed/choral	choir of mixed voices and stereophonic acousmonium/loudspeakers	08.21	op.163	text by Thomas Brando
2012	Accordéon	mixed/solo	voice and stereophonic acousmonium/loudspeakers	03.24	op.162	from the cycle Fantaisies romantiques et baroques/Plis de perversion
2012	Selva	acousmatic	stereophonic acousmonium/loudspeakers	06.40	op.161	
2012	Volver	acousmatic	stereophonic acousmonium/loudspeakers	06.30	op.160	
2012	Syntagma	acousmatic	stereophonic acousmonium/loudspeakers	13.00	op.159	dedicated to Iannis Xenakis
2011	Hentai	acousmatic	stereophonic acousmonium/loudspeakers	10.32	op.158	text by Thomas Brando
2011	Variations acousmatiques	acousmatic	stereophonic acousmonium/loudspeakers	14.26	op.157	
2011	Les Invasions fantômes	acousmatic	stereophonic acousmonium/loudspeakers	32.50	op.149	text by Thomas Brando
2011	Poursuite	instrumental/ensemble	violin and violoncello	09.30	op.156	
2011	Rivage de la soif	acousmatic	stereophonic acousmonium/loudspeakers	10.00	op.155	text by Thomas Brando, from the cycle Les Acousmalides
2010	The Wall	acousmatic	stereophonic acousmonium/loudspeakers	28.40	op.154-a	
2010	Mur	multimedia	stereophonic acousmonium/loudspeakers and video	28.40	op.154-b	
2010	Ryoan-ji [Le jardin de Pierre de Kyoto]	acousmatic	stereophonic acousmonium/loudspeakers	10.19	op.153	from the cycle Fantaisies romantiques et baroques/Délicieux danger
2009	La Chasse à l'ombilic	mixed/ensemble	narrator, violin, viola, violoncello and stereophonic acousmonium/loudspeakers	11.06	op.152	text by Thomas Brando
2009	Gaillarde	instrumental/ensemble	ensemble of recorders	06.30	op.151	
2009	Face aux ténèbres	mixed/ensemble	alto saxophone, percussion, piano and stereophonic acousmonium/loudspeakers	10.14	op.150	from the cycle Le Livre des désordres
2009	L'Attente des nuages	mixed/solo	contralto and stereophonic acousmonium/loudspeakers	38.15	op.148	text by Thomas Brando
2009	Augen Licht	acousmatic	stereophonic acousmonium/loudspeakers	25.00	op.147	
2009	The Blob	acousmatic	stereophonic acousmonium/loudspeakers	10.11	op.146	from the cycle Le Livre des désordres
2008	Acid Folk	mixed/ensemble	clarinet, violoncello and stereophonic acousmonium/loudspeakers	42.00	op.145	
2008	PH 27-80	acousmatic	stereophonic acousmonium/loudspeakers	80.27	op.144	dedicated to Pierre Henry
2008	Heimliches Licht	mixed/solo	flute and stereophonic acousmonium/loudspeakers	07.25	op.143	from the cycle Le Livre des désordres
2008	Noir	mixed/solo	piano and stereophonic acousmonium/loudspeakers	06.00	op.142	from the cycle Le Livre des désordres
2008	Flamme	instrumental/orchestral	symphony orchestra	03.30	op.141	
2007	Carosello	acousmatic	16 channel acousmonium/loudspeakers	08.14	op.140	
2007	Dionaea	acousmatic	stereophonic acousmonium/loudspeakers	10.10	op.139	from the cycle Le Livre des désordres
2007	Spiritus / Stella	instrumental/ensemble	2 viola de gambas	10.00	op.138	from the cycle Le Livre des désordres
2007	L'Esprit en étoile	acousmatic	stereophonic acousmonium/loudspeakers	14.44	op.137	from the cycle Le Livre des désordres
2006	Altitude	instrumental/solo	viola	12.30	op.136	
2005	Oriflamme	instrumental/ensemble	saxophone and percussion	12.00	op.135	
2005	Voix Off'	acousmatic	stereophonic+hexaphonic acousmonium/loudspeakers	91.02	op.134	text by Thomas Brando
2005	Salves	mixed/ensemble	flute, saxophone, percussion, piano and stereophonic acousmonium/loudspeakers	35.00	op.133	
2004	Deux rainettes vertes	mixed/ensemble	2 guitars and acousmonium/loudspeakers	10.10	op.132	from the cycle Fantaisies romantiques et baroques/Marais
2004	Secret plié en seize dans le coffre de hune	instrumental/ensemble	guitar, violin, viola and violoncello	05.00	op.131	from the cycle Fantaisies romantiques et baroques/Plis de perversion
2004	Rainette verte	instrumental/solo	guitar	06.00	op.130	from the cycle Fantaisies romantiques et baroques/Marais
2003	Sphère	instrumental/orchestral	large orchestra	06.30	op.129	
2003	La Tour des murmures	acousmatic	16 channel acousmonium/loudspeakers	70.00	op.128	
2003	Silex	instrumental/ensemble	flute, clarinet, violin, viola and violoncello	13.00	op.127	
2003	Le Tango de l'oubli	acousmatic	stereophonic acousmonium/loudspeakers	04.02	op.126	
2003	Sotto voce	acousmatic	stereophonic acousmonium/loudspeakers	15.22	op.125	text by Thomas Brando
2002	Géométrie mystique	acousmatic	stereophonic acousmonium/loudspeakers	04.28	op.124	text by Thomas Brando, from the cycle Les Acousmalides
2002	Mille soleils	instrumental/orchestral	symphonic band	18.00	op.123	
2002	La Terre est ronde	acousmatic	stereophonic acousmonium/loudspeakers	11'05	op.122	Compact Disc: Motus Acousma M303006; dedicated to Jonathan Prager
2002	L’Ivre d’avril	acousmatic	stereophonic acousmonium/loudspeakers	04.10	op.121	text by Thomas Brando, from the cycle Les Acousmalides
2002	L’Heure exacte	mixed/ensemble	clarinet, saxophone, trombone, piano and stereophonic acousmonium/loudspeakers	13.00	op.120	
2002	Confession	instrumental/ensemble	soprano, flute, percussion and violoncello	06.00	op.119	text by Thomas Brando, from the cycle Le Plaisir des chants difficiles
2002	Dédale	instrumental/ensemble	soprano, flute, percussion and violoncello	07.10	op.118	text by Thomas Brando, from the cycle Le Plaisir des chants difficiles
2002	Préhistoire	instrumental/ensemble	soprano, flute, percussion and violoncello	05.10	op.117	text by Thomas Brando, from the cycle Le Plaisir des chants difficiles
2001	Piano dans le ciel	acousmatic	stereophonic acousmonium/loudspeakers	37.00	op.116	
2001	Panique au bord de l’eau	acousmatic	stereophonic acousmonium/loudspeakers	06.05	op.115	text by Thomas Brando, from the cycle Les Acousmalides
2001	La Malédiction des flammes	acousmatic	stereophonic acousmonium/loudspeakers	06.11	op.114	text by Thomas Brando; from the cycle Les Acousmalides; Compact Disc: Licences LCScd01
2001	Berechit	acousmatic	stereophonic acousmonium/loudspeakers	06.00	op.113	
2001	Spirale	acousmatic	stereophonic acousmonium/loudspeakers	18.48	op.112	
2001	Nautilus	acousmatic	stereophonic acousmonium/loudspeakers	07.44	op.111	
2000	Chanson de la plus haute tour	acousmatic	stereophonic double acousmonium/loudspeakers	72.00	op.110	text by Thomas Brando; voice of Pierre Henry; dedicated to Pierre Henry
2000	Organa	acousmatic	stereophonic acousmonium/loudspeakers	09.00	op.109	
2000	Caravaggio	acousmatic	stereophonic acousmonium/loudspeakers	10.00	op.108	text by Thomas Brando, from the cycle Les Acousmalides, Licences
2000	La Nuit du Dibdak	acousmatic	stereophonic acousmonium/loudspeakers	06.12	op.107	co-composed with Roberto Kenofsky; text by Marc Jaffeux; Compact Disc: Studio Forum
2000	L’Aile de l’abeille	acousmatic	stereophonic acousmonium/loudspeakers	07.00	op.106	text by Marc Jaffeux
1999	Les Joueurs de sons	acousmatic	stereophonic+hexaphonic acousmonium/loudspeakers	72.40	op.105	co-composed with Agnes Poisson
1999	Organe	mixed/solo	organ and stereophonic acousmonium/loudspeakers	12.00	op.104	
1998	Orange-Cité	instrumental/ensemble	flute, clarinet, percussion, piano, violin, viola, violoncello and contrabass	08.30	op.103	
1998	Cinq miniatures pour Barbe Bleue	instrumental/ensemble	soprano, bass, flute, clarinet, piano, violin, viola and violoncello	12.00	op.102	text by Thomas Brando
1998	Terra incognita	acousmatic	stereophonic double acousmonium/loudspeakers	25.42	op.101	Compact Disc: Motus Acousma M199005; dedicated to Pierre Schaeffer
1998	Lachrymae	instrumental/ensemble	6 viols	25.00	op.100	
1997	Beethov’étonne	acousmatic	stereophonic acousmonium/loudspeakers	04.20	op.099	
1997	Lux tenebrae	acousmatic	stereophonic acousmonium/loudspeakers	22.14	op.098	Compact Disc: Motus Acousma M199005
1997	Ebene Sieben	acousmatic	stereophonic acousmonium/loudspeakers	25.40	op.097	Compact Disc: Motus Acousma M199005; dedicated to Karlheinz Stockhausen
1997	Le Petit oiseau va sortir	acousmatic	stereophonic acousmonium/loudspeakers	14.00	op.096	
1997	Le Mystère des tornades	mixed/ensemble	oboe, harp, viola, violoncello and stereophonic acousmonium/loudspeakers	25.30	op.095	
1997	Fanfare	acousmatic	octophonic acousmonium/loudspeakers	06.41	op.094	
1996	Variations sur un thème de François Bayle	instrumental/ensemble	piccolo	03.00	op.093	
1996	Trois transcriptions d’après Rameau	instrumental/ensemble	flute, oboe, clarinet, harp, piano, violin, viola and violoncello	14.00	op.092	
1996	Une abeille et une perle	acousmatic	stereophonic acousmonium/loudspeakers	13.22	op.091	
1996	Excusez-moi, je meurs	instrumental/ensemble	piano, percussion and violoncello	06.30	op.090	from the cycle Fantaisies romantiques et baroques/Délicieux danger
1996	Nuage de Pierre	acousmatic	stereophonic acousmonium/loudspeakers	05.05	op.089	from the cycle Fantaisies romantiques et baroques/Délicieux danger
1996	Bazar punaise	acousmatic	stereophonic acousmonium/loudspeakers	41.26	op.088	text by Thomas Brando
1996	Elixir	acousmatic	stereophonic acousmonium/loudspeakers	12.34	op.087	Compact Disc: Motus Acousma M303006
1995	Hélice	acousmatic	stereophonic acousmonium/loudspeakers	11.58	op.086	Compact Disc: Motus Acousma M303006
1995	Exil	acousmatic	stereophonic acousmonium/loudspeakers	12.39	op.085	Compact Disc: Motus Acousma M303006
1995	Litanie pour les vierges	instrumental/choral	2 treble choirs and 12 strings	17.00	op.084	text by Thomas Brando
1995	Allégorie	acousmatic	stereophonic acousmonium/loudspeakers	69.30	op.083	
1995	Avalanche	instrumental/solo	piano	51.00	op.082	dedicated to François-Michel Rignol
1995	Golgotha	acousmatic	stereophonic acousmonium/loudspeakers	26.50	op.081	texts by Thomas Brando and Marc Jaffeux
1994	Offrande ou l’être achevé	acousmatic	stereophonic acousmonium/loudspeakers	17.00	op.080	text by Thomas Brando
1993	Où est maintenant la forêt ?	acousmatic	stereophonic acousmonium/loudspeakers	26.28	op.079	Compact Disc: Motus Acousma M197001
1993	Chrysalide	acousmatic	stereophonic acousmonium/loudspeakers	29.05	op.078	Compact Disc: GRM Ina e5007
1993	Flèches	acousmatic	stereophonic acousmonium/loudspeakers	26.00	op.077	text by Thomas Brando
1992	Ataraxie	instrumental/ensemble	2 recorder quartets and a recorder ensemble	12.00	op.076	Compact Disc: MA 2005
1992	En effeuillant la marguerite	instrumental/solo	oboe	15.00	op.075	text by Marc Jaffeux
1992	Archéoptéryx	instrumental/ensemble	flute, oboe, clarinet, saxophone, trombone, accordion and piano four hands	13.00	op.074	
1992	Cannibale	instrumental/ensemble	guitar and sampler with trigger	07.00	op.073	
1992	Souvenir de craie	instrumental/ensemble	flute, oboe, clarinet, saxophone, trombone, accordion and piano four hands	04.00	op.072	from the cycle Fantaisies romantiques et baroques/Délicieux danger
1992	Collection de timbres	mixed/solo	organ and stereophonic acousmonium/loudspeakers	25.00	op.071	text by Thomas Brando
1992	Salamandre	instrumental/ensemble	flute, oboe, clarinet, harp, violin and violoncello	07.30	op.070	from the cycle Fantaisies romantiques et baroques/Marais
1991	Crapaud brillant	instrumental/solo	harpsichord	08.00	op.069	from the cycle Fantaisies romantiques et baroques/Marais
1991	Légende	acousmatic	stereophonic acousmonium/loudspeakers	25.45	op.068	
1991	Charge maximale	acousmatic	stereophonic acousmonium/loudspeakers	31.50	op.067	text by Thomas Brando
1991	Interruption	instrumental/ensemble	flute, synthesizer, violin, viola, violoncello, actor	10.00	op.066	text by Thomas Brando
1991	Tom et la Licorne	mixed/ensemble	solo voices, vocal quartet, instrumental ensemble, stereophonic acousmonium/loudspeakers	90.00	op.065	text by Thomas Brando
1991	Torrents du miroir	instrumental/ensemble	soprano, mezzo-soprano, counter-tenor, bass, flute, saxophone, horn, trumpet, trombone, violin and contrabass	15.00	op.064	text by Thomas Brando; Compact Disc: ENM D03
1990	Duel	instrumental/ensemble	2 trumpets	04.00	op.063	
1990	Le Labyrinthe de l'amour /2	mixed/ensemble	jazz ensemble and stereophonic acousmonium/loudspeakers	21.00	op.062	
1990	Alpage	instrumental/solo	electronic percussion	09.00	op.061	text by Thomas Brando
1990	Chanson pensive	instrumental/ensemble	flute, bass flute, clarinet, basset horn, bass clarinet, viola and sampler	20.00	op.060	
1990	Hérisson cathédrale	instrumental/ensemble	flute, clarinet, violin, violoncello, piano, celesta and harpsichord	19.00	op.059	
1989	Cet été sur la plage (acousmatic version)	acousmatic	stereophonic acousmonium/loudspeakers	12.00	op.058-b	text by Thomas Brando, from the cycle Les Acousmalides
1989	Cet été sur la plage	mixed/solo	oboe and stereophonic acousmonium/loudspeakers	12.00	op.058-a	text by Thomas Brando
1989	Tu sa' ch'i' so	instrumental/ensemble	soprano, clarinet, violin, viola and violoncello	19.00	op.057	text by Michelangelo
1989	Jeu délicieux	instrumental/ensemble	tenor and viola	11.00	op.056	text by Denis Dufour
1989	Tulipe	mixed/solo	horn and stereophonic acousmonium/loudspeakers	07.20	op.055	
1989	Notre besoin de consolation est impossible à rassasier	acousmatic	stereophonic acousmonium/loudspeakers	67.22	op.054	text by Stig Dagerman; voice of Thomas Brando; Compact Disc: GRM Ina c1010
1988	Noël toxique	acousmatic	stereophonic acousmonium/loudspeakers	03.10	op.053	text by Thomas Brando
1988	Moirures éteintes de la galaxie (Cosmophonie)	instrumental/ensemble	clarinet, horn, percussion, violin, violoncello and 2 synthesizers	20.00	op.052	from the cycle Fantaisies romantiques et baroques/Plis de perversion
1988	Grenouille écarlate	instrumental/solo	guitar	08.00	op.051	from the cycle Fantaisies romantiques et baroques/Marais
1988	Douze mélodies acousmatiques	acousmatic	stereophonic acousmonium/loudspeakers	25.41	op.050	Compact Disc: Motus Acousma M197002, dedicated to Michel Chion
1988	Etude pour synthétiseur	instrumental/solo	synthesizer	03.30	op.049	
1988	Drapé de peaux de bêtes sur le corps des héros (L'Homme au masque de craie)	instrumental/orchestral	mezzo-soprano and orchestra	20.00	op.048	text by Thomas Brando, from the cycle Fantaisies romantiques et baroques/Plis de perversion
1987	Nuit d'hiver	instrumental/ensemble	oboe, clarinet, horn, trombone, glockenspiel, harp and 2 violoncellos	14.00	op.047-b	
1987	Nuit d'hiver	instrumental/ensemble	oboe, clarinet, horn, trombone, glockenspiel, harp, 2 violoncellos and narrator	14.00	op.047-a	text by Dominique Dubreuil
1987	Messe à l'usage des vieillards	acousmatic	quadriphonic acousmonium/loudspeakers	32.50	op.046	text by Thomas Brando; Compact Disc: Accord UnaCorda 202222
1987	Musique à coudre	acousmatic	stereophonic acousmonium/loudspeakers	41.30	op.045	co-composed with Brigitte Gardet
1986	Messe à l'usage des enfants	acousmatic	quadriphonic acousmonium/loudspeakers	30.35	op.044	text by Thomas Brando
1986	Tandem oblique	instrumental/ensemble	flute and piano	14.00	op.043	Compact Disc: Motus Aujourd’hui M298004
1986	Psaume d'Adam	acousmatic	stereophonic acousmonium/loudspeakers	10.45	op.042	text by Thomas Brando, from the cycle Les Acousmalides
1986	Deux cartes postales	acousmatic	stereophonic acousmonium/loudspeakers	08.35	op.041	
1986	Exactement le contraire	multimedia	ballet and stereophonic acousmonium/loudspeakers	69.00	op.040	
1985	Le Pistolet d'or	instrumental/ensemble	2 violins, 2 violas and 2 violoncellos	23.00	op.039	
1985	Fantaisie soluble	instrumental/ensemble	clarinet, horn, percussion, violin, violoncello and 2 synthesizers	14.00	op.038	
1985	Froncement des yeux de ton beau visage (1e lettre à Pinocchio)	instrumental/ensemble	violin, violoncello and synthesizer	15.00	op.037	from the cycle Fantaisies romantiques et baroques/Plis de perversion
1985	La Cour des immortels du désir	multimedia	ballet and stereophonic acousmonium/loudspeakers	71.05	op.036	
1984	Le Labyrinthe de l'amour /1	acousmatic	stereophonic acousmonium/loudspeakers	03.35	op.035	Compact Disc: Licences
1984	Paysage	mixed/solo	violoncello and stereophonic acousmonium/loudspeakers	03.30	op.034	
1984	Ourlé du lac à la première goutte de pluie (Pli de perversion /2)	instrumental/ensemble	violin, synthesizer and real time transformation device	14.00	op.033	from the cycle Fantaisies romantiques et baroques/Plis de perversion; Compact Disc: GRM Ina c1034
1984	Quatuor “Non parmi les anges”	instrumental/ensemble	soprano, violin, viola and violoncello	05.10	op.032	text by Thomas Brando, from the cycle Le Plaisir des chants difficiles
1984	Dix portraits	acousmatic	stereophonic acousmonium/loudspeakers	38.20	op.031-b	Compact Disc: Motus Acousma M197002
1984	Dix portraits	mixed/ensemble	3 synthesizers and stereophonic acousmonium/loudspeakers	40.00	op.031-a	
1983	Colloque	acousmatic	stereophonic acousmonium/loudspeakers	15.07	op.030	
1983	Six mélodies	instrumental/ensemble	soprano and piano	11.00	op.029	text by Jean-Christophe Thomas
1983	Vendredi, jour de liberté	multimedia	drama and stereophonic acousmonium/loudspeakers	25.15	op.028	
1983	Suite bleue	acousmatic	stereophonic acousmonium/loudspeakers	19.20	op.027	Compact Disc: Accord UnaCorda 202222
1983	Le Lis vert	acousmatic	stereophonic acousmonium/loudspeakers	37.00	op.026	Compact Disc: Motus Acousma M306011
1982	Entre dames	acousmatic	stereophonic acousmonium/loudspeakers	19.30	op.025	
1982	Lèvres serviles	instrumental/choral	female choir	20.00	op.024	
1982	Rêve lisse	instrumental/ensemble	violin and 2 synthesizers	12.00	op.023	Compact Disc: GRM Ina 9115/9116
1981	Suite en trois mouvements	acousmatic	stereophonic acousmonium/loudspeakers	21.13	op.022	Compact Disc: Motus Acousma M303006
1981	Dune	instrumental/ensemble	2 flutes	08.30	op.021	
1980	La Galerie	mixed/ensemble	3 sounding bodies, 3 synthesizers and stereophonic acousmonium/loudspeakers	46.30	op.020	
1980	L'Apocalypse d'Angers	mixed/solo	narrator and stereophonic acousmonium/loudspeakers	50.30	op.019-b	text selected by Benjamin Duvshani from the Apocalypse of John
1980	L'Apocalypse d'Angers	acousmatic	stereophonic acousmonium/loudspeakers	50.30	op.019-a	text selected by Benjamin Duvshani from the Apocalypse of John; voice of Benjamin Duvshani
1980	J.a.ch.H.16	mixed/ensemble	3 synthesizers	18.45	op.018	
1979	La Douceur a des cils	instrumental/ensemble	soprano, alto, tenor, bass	18.30	op.017	text by Michel Vincent
1979	Un petit qui t'aime	mixed/ensemble	3 percussionists and stereophonic acousmonium/loudspeakers	15.30	op.016	
1979	Rond de jambe	acousmatic	stereophonic acousmonium/loudspeakers	08.05	op.015	
1979	Le Cercle dans tous ses états	multimedia	ballet and stereophonic acousmonium/loudspeakers	55.30	op.014	
1979	Cueillir à l'arbre un petit garçon	instrumental/ensemble	saxophone, synthesizer and real time transformation device	14.00	op.013	
1979	Je voulais parler des oiseaux	mixed/ensemble	soprano, guitar and stereophonic acousmonium/loudspeakers	40.00	op.012	text by Jean-Christophe Thomas and Denis Dufour
1978	Velours des dunes infoulées (Pli de perversion /1)	instrumental/ensemble	string instrument and synthesizer	11.00	op.011	from the cycle Fantaisies romantiques et baroques/Plis de perversion
1978	Souvenir de Pierre	instrumental/ensemble	any 3 or more instruments	05.00	op.010	from the cycle Fantaisies romantiques et baroques/Délicieux danger
1978	Trio	instrumental/ensemble	violin, mandolin, synthesizer and real time transformation device	14.00	op.009	
1978	Bocalises, grande suite	acousmatic	stereophonic acousmonium/loudspeakers	36.43	op.008	Compact Disc: Motus Acousma M306011
1977	Bocalises, petite suite	acousmatic	stereophonic acousmonium/loudspeakers	19.02	op.007	Compact Discs: Accord UnaCorda 202222; Eferp 97-2; GRM Ina c1000
1977	Concerto	instrumental/orchestral	violin and orchestra	18.00	op.006	
1977	Boucles	instrumental/solo	10 string guitar	05.00	op.005	
1977	Objet-danse	multimedia	ballet and stereophonic acousmonium/loudspeakers	93.00	op.004	
1977	Le Crin s'ébruite	instrumental/ensemble	viola and percussion	16.00	op.003	
1977	En sursaut	instrumental/ensemble	soprano and viola	10.00	op.002	text by Denis Dufour
1976	Etude de composition /1	acousmatic	stereophonic acousmonium/loudspeakers	04.46	op.001	

== Discography ==
Publisher	Year	Reference	Contents
EAP Records	2013	Denis Dufour PH 27-80 EAP Records N°01	• PH 27-80
Licences	2009	Brûlures des langues I-X Licences LCScd01	• La Malédiction des flammes
Motus	2006	Bocalises Motus Acousma M306011	• Bocalises, grande suite • Le Lis vert
Licences	2004	Licences n° 2 Licences	• Le Labyrinthe de l'amour
Ina GRM	2004	Archives GRM 4/5 · Le temps du temps réel GRM Ina c1034	• Pli de perversion (excerpt)
Motus	2003	La Terre est ronde Motus Acousma M303006	• Elixir • Exil • Hélice • La Terre est ronde • Suite en trois mouvements
Motus	2002	Terra incognita Motus Acousma M199005	• Ebene sieben • Lux tenebrae • Terra incognita
Studio Forum	2001	Virtual Zoo Studio Forum	• La Nuit du Dibdak
Licences	2000	Licences n° 1 Licences	• Caravaggio • Entre dames
Motus	1998	L’Air du large Motus Aujourd’hui M298004	• Tandem oblique
Ina GRM	1997	Les 50 ans de la musique concrète Ina GRM LMC 9798	• Messe à l'usage des vieillards (excerpt)
Motus	1997	Dix portraits / Douze mélodies acousmatiques Motus Acousma M197002	• Dix portraits • Douze mélodies acousmatiques
Motus	1997	Où est maintenant la forêt? Motus Acousma M197001	• Où est maintenant la forêt?
Eferp	1997	XIX° Concorso internazionale Luigi Russolo di musica elettroacustica Eferp 97-2	• Bocalises, petite suite
Ina GRM	1996	Chrysalide GRM Ina e5007	• Chrysalide
CEEPAME / Musicale Ecole / In-Octavio / DPM / GAMME	2005	Cultivons notre oreille F.E.R. 1	• Bocalises (excerpt)
Ina GRM	1995	La Collection CD GRM Ina ACM 1995	• Notre besoin de consolation est impossible a rassasier (excerpt)
MA	1993	L’Air du temps MA 2005	• Ataraxie
Accord UnaCorda	1992	Messe à l'usage des vieillards Accord UnaCorda 202222	• Bocalises, petite suite • Messe à l'usage des vieillards • Suite bleue
Ina GRM	1991	Notre besoin de consolation est impossible a rassasier GRM Ina c1010	• Notre besoin de consolation est impossible a rassasier
ENM	1991	Troisième concours de composition André Jolivet ENM D03	• Torrents du miroir
Ina GRM	1984	Concert imaginaire GRM GRM Ina c1000	• Bocalises (excerpt)
Ina GRM	1984	Dufour Geslin Cuniot Mion Parmegiani GRM Ina 9115/9116	• Rêve lisse
Ina GRM	1982	Pierre Schaeffer Parole et Musique GRM Ina 9106	• Souvenir de Pierre
REM	1980	Duo Delangle Saxophone et Piano REM 10864	• Cueillir à l'arbre un petit garçon
