= John Anthony Lennon =

American classical composer

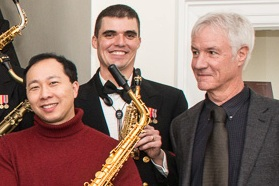
John Anthony Lennon (right) at International Saxophone Symposium in 2016

John Anthony Lennon (born 1950 in Greensboro, North Carolina) is an American composer of contemporary classical music based in Georgia.

== Biography ==
=== Early life and education ===
John Anthony Lennon was born in Greensboro, North Carolina and raised in Mill Valley, California. He earned a B.A. degree in liberal arts from the University of San Francisco, first majoring in English and minoring in philosophy, later adding music courses. He received M.M. and D.M.A. degrees in music composition from the University of Michigan, where he studied composition with Leslie Bassett and William Bolcom.

=== Academic career ===
Lennon is Professor Emeritus of Music at Emory University in Atlanta. He formerly taught at the University of Tennessee (starting in 1977), and taught as a guest composer at Northwestern University in the spring of 1998.

=== Composer ===
Lennon is known particularly for his works for classical guitar (many of which were written for the American guitarist David Starobin), including Another's Fandango (1981), Gigolo (1996), and the guitar concerto Zingari (1991), and for several contributions to the classical saxophone repertoire, including "Distances Within Me" (1980) for James Forger, "Symphonic Rhapsody" for Donald Sinta, "Spiral Mirrors" (2009) for the Creviston Fader Duo, "Elysian Bridges" (2011) for the Capitol Quartet, "Escapades" for Christopher Creviston, and several other chamber pieces.

Lennon's music is published by C. F. Peters, E. C. Schirmer, Dorn Publications, Michael Lorimer Editions, Northeastern Publications, Galaxy/Columbia University Press, and Oxford University Press. His music has been recorded by CRI, Bridge Records, Contemporary Record Society, Society of Composers/Capstone, and Open Loop, and (as a performer) with the University of Michigan recording series.

=== Awards ===
In 1981 Lennon was the recipient of a Guggenheim Fellowship. In 1994 he won a Kennedy Center Friedheim Award, tying for third place. Additionally, Lennon has also won a Rome Prize and been a resident of the MacDowell Colony.

Lennon lives in San Rafael, California.
