= Andrew Paul MacDonald =

Canadian musician

Andrew Paul MacDonald CM (born 30 November 1958) is a Canadian classical composer, guitarist, conductor, and music educator. His compositions have been performed in many countries and recorded by well-known musical ensembles.

== Early life and education ==
Born in Guelph, Ontario, MacDonald studied music theory and piano with Rosemarie Hamilton and guitar with Alexandre Lagoya, Michael Lorimer, Ray Sealey and Manuel Lopez-Ramos. He earned a Bachelor of Music from the University of Western Ontario in 1981 where he was a pupil of Arsenio Girón and Alan Heard. He pursued graduate studies in music composition at the University of Michigan (UM) where he earned both a Master of Music (1982) and a Doctor of Musical Arts (1985). At the UM he was a pupil of William Albright, William Bolcom, Leslie Bassett, and George Balch Wilson.

== Career ==
In 1985 MacDonald returned to Canada. He spent the next two years teaching in Manitoba and Quebec. In 1987 he joined the faculty at Bishop's University in Lennoxville, Quebec where as of 2015 he is chairman and professor of composition and electronic music. At the school he was instrumental in founding the Ensemble Musica Nova, an organization of which he is serves as the Artistic Director. From 1993 to 1997 he served as Vice-President and Council member of the Canadian League of Composers. In addition to teaching and composing, he remains active as a classical and electric guitarist and as a conductor.

== Compositions ==
MacDonald's compositions have been performed in many countries including England, Norway, France, Germany, the Netherlands, Taiwan, Turkey, the United States and Australia, as well as in Canada by the Toronto Symphony Orchestra, l'Orchestre symphonique de Montréal, the Esprit Orchestra, l'Orchestre symphonique de Québec, the Winnipeg Symphony Orchestra, the Manitoba Chamber Orchestra, Symphony Nova Scotia, the Vancouver Symphony Orchestra, the CBC Vancouver Orchestra, the Calgary Philharmonic Orchestra, the Evergreen Club and the I Musici de Montréal.

MacDonald has had works commissioned by professional orchestras, chamber ensembles, solo performers, music competitions, the Canadian Opera Company and the Canadian Broadcasting Corporation. His works are frequently broadcast on CBC and Société Radio-Canada. He has also had many of his compositions recorded on compact disc and has won prizes for his works, including the 2005 East Coast Music Award for Jasper Wood's recording of "Great Square of Pegasus", which also won the 2005 Independent Music Award, and the 1995 Juno Award for "Best Classical Composition" for his Violin Concerto.

In 2011 he collaborated with Michael Shamata at Pacific Opera Victoria to create a new opera based on Stephen Massicotte's play, Mary's Wedding.

== Discography ==
- 2005: For There and Then, The Evergreen Club
- 2004: Quintette à Vent Estria
- 2004: The Great Square of Pegasus, Jasper Wood
- 2004: Wild Honey, Timothy Steeves and Nancy Dahn
- 2000: Premieres!, Arthur Campbell
- 1998: Harbord Street, Trio Lyra
- 1998: Among Friends, Trio des Iscles
- 1996: 20 years of resistance to genocide in East Timor
- 1995: Canadian Music for Chamber Orchestra, Manitoba Chamber Orchestra
- 1993: Orchestre Mondiale des Jeunesses Musicales
- 1991: Music for the Open Air, Quatuor Claudel
- 1991: Passage through Time
