= Tiziano Manca =

Italian composer

Tiziano Manca (born 27 June 1970) is an Italian composer of contemporary classical music.

== Biography ==
Born in Squinzano, Italy, Tiziano Manca attended the Faculty of Philosophy and the Conservatory in Florence, studying Electronic Music and Composition with Romano Pezzati and Salvatore Sciarrino. He undertook also further studies in conducting with Piero Bellugi.

In 2001 he was composer-in-residence in Japan (Akiyoshidai International Art Village), in 2001–2002 in Royaumont (Paris) and in 2002–2003 at the Akademie Schloss Solitude (Stuttgart).

His music has been performed in Amsterdam (Gaudeamus Music Week), Anvers (Ars Musica), Stuttgart (Theaterhaus), Darmstadt (Ferienkurse), Lucerne (Lucerne Festival), Paris (Théâtre Dunois, Abbaye de Royaumont), Lille (Opera), Stuttgart (Theaterhaus), Berlin (Konzerthaus) and Japan (Akiyoshidai International Art Village).

Tiziano Manca is also a researcher. He will defend a doctorate on rhythm and rhythm notation in Western music theory and practice in 2022.

== Selected works ==
- Deserto colore for Voice and Piano (1998)
- Ondine for Chamber Orchestra (1998)
- Flatus vocis for Flute (1999)
- Deux Epigrammes amoureuses et un intimation for Clarinet, Violin, Cello, Voice, Percussion and Piano (2000)
- Narcisse for two Baritones (2001–2002)
- Nel labirinto for Trumpet, Trombone, Percussion, Bass Drum, Guitar, Cello, Piano (2003)
- Limen for Tenor Sax, Guitar and Marimba (2003)
- La Gabbia opera in un atto (2003–2004) Libretto di Alejandro Tantanian
- Moi, Daniel G. for Countertenor, Violin, Bariton Saxophon, Piano (2005) Text by Samuel Beckett
- Nell'assenza dei venti for Chamber Orchestra (2006)
- Defining for Flute, Clarinet, Vibraphon, Violin, Viola, Cello, Piano (2007–2009)

== References and external links ==
- "Tiziano Manca" (biography, works, resources) (in French and English). IRCAM.
- Personal website of the composer
- Manca, Tiziano (2023). Before Sound: Re-Composing Material, Time, and Bodies in Music. Bielefeld: transcript. ISBN 978-3-8376-6886-5.

Specific
