= Tom Eastwood =

British composer (1922–1999)

- Born: Thomas Hugh Eastwood; 12 March 1922
- Died: 25 December 1999 (aged 77); England
- Occupation: Composer
- Musical career

Thomas Hugh Eastwood (12 March 1922 – 25 October 1999) was a British composer.

He was the son of General Sir Thomas Ralph Eastwood and Lady Mabel Vivian Temperley Eastwood. His grandmother was Ellinor Hall Smyth (married name Eastwood), sister of the British composer Dame Ethel Smyth.

Tom Eastwood was educated at Eton and Trinity College, Cambridge University. During World War II he was aide-de-camp to his father who was then Governor of Gibraltar.

He first studied music in Turkey with Necil Akses, then in Berlin and London with Boris Blacher and Professor Erwin Stein. Tom Eastwood's inspirations included Greek theatre and later in life his musical imagination was fired by Brazilian folklore, history and music. His music encompasses contemporary themes such as the murdered environmental activist, Chico Mendes. He won a prize at the 1949 Cheltenham Music Festival for his String Trio.

Tom Eastwood worked for the British Council in Ankara and Berlin 1947–54, was a member of the Council of the Society for the Promotion of New Music from 1959 and was on the executive committee in 1959. In 1969 he wrote a television opera for the BBC, The Rebel.
