= Angelo Gilardino =

Italian composer, guitarist, and musicologist (1941–2022)

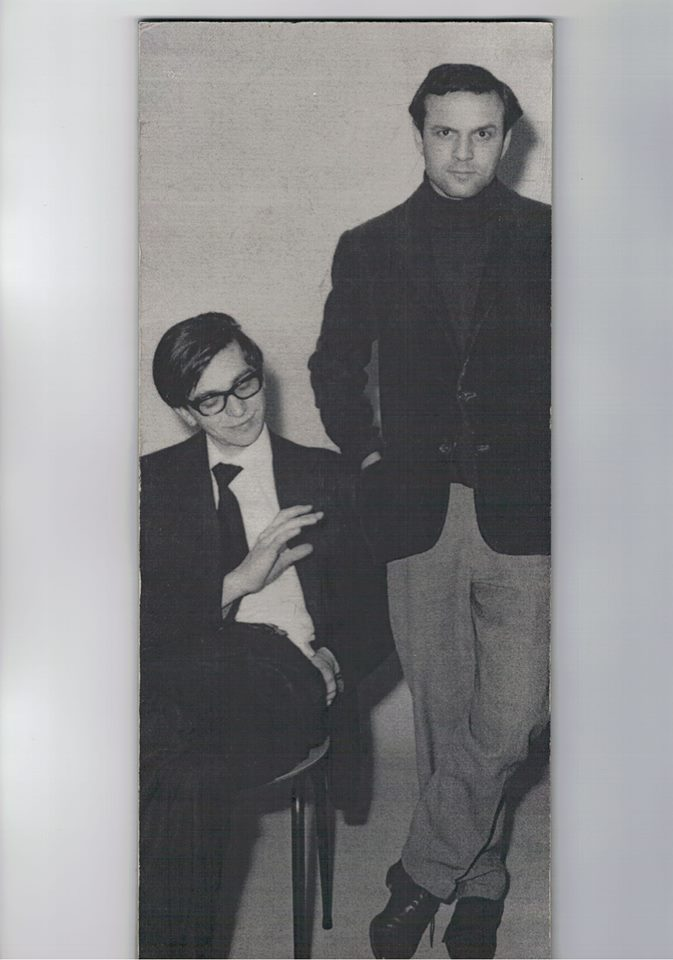
Gilardino e Cecconello

Angelo Gilardino (16 November 1941 – 14 January 2022) was an Italian composer, guitarist, and musicologist.

== Life and career ==
Gilardino was born in Vercelli, Italy, on 16 November 1941.

During his concert career, from 1958 to 1981, he premiered hundreds of new works for the guitar. Among his premieres was John Duarte's Mutations on Dies Irae in 1974. He taught at the Liceo Musicale G. B. Viotti in Vercelli from 1965 to 1981, and held a professorship at the Antonio Vivaldi Conservatory in Alessandria from 1981 to 2004. The Conservatory awarded him the Marengo Music Prize in 1998.

Gilardino has composed much music for solo guitar, as well as chamber music and concertos. His solo works include five volumes of Studi di virtuosità e di trascendenza (1981–1988), two numbered sonatas (1985, 1986) as well as several titled sonatas and sonatinas, two sets of variations (1989, 1991), and Ikonostas for a guitar tuned in G (2004).

The Studi di virtuosità e di trascendenza represent one of the most significant contributions to the guitar repertoire in the 20th century. The title places the collection in the tradition of the Transcendental Etudes by Franz Liszt. Numbers 1 through 48 have dedications that play an important role in identifying influences and traditions that are important to the composer and help provide a context in which to interpret the individual etudes. These have been recorded by the guitarist Cristiano Porqueddu for Brilliant Classics.

He has also written four works for guitar with guitar orchestra, seven concertos for guitar, some in combination with other instruments (including mandolin and accordion), and several duets (for guitar with bassoon, cello, violin and vibraphone).

From 1967 to 2006, Gilardino supervised the publication of hundreds of new guitar works by Edizioni Musicali Bèrben. He has also discovered the Variazioni by Ottorino Respighi and several works written for the guitarist Andrés Segovia by Cyril Scott, Pierre de Bréville, Lennox Berkeley and many others. He was artistic director of the Andrés Segovia Foundation of Linares from 1997 to 2005.

In 2009 the Guitar Foundation of America conferred upon him the prestigious Artistic Achievement Award which is reserved for performers, composers, pedagogues, and scholars who have made monumental contributions to the development of the art and life of the classical guitar.

Gilardino died on 14 January 2022, at the age of 80.

== Quotes ==
- "I am not a good interpreter of my own music - I never played it and I avoid giving lessons with my music on the stand. " - rec.music.classical.guitar (23 January 2003)
- "I have no connection with my pieces, except when I am composing them. Since then, especially when published, they belong to everybody, and I am no longer especially fond of a piece or of another. I feel insignificant and unimportant in respect of the music I write. I have to add - to be quite honest - that when teaching I do not like to deal with my own music. [...] when it happens I have to teach a piece of my own, I feel rather uncertain about what to say." - Interview with Angelo Gilardino
- "Actually, since 1981 to March of this year I was active as a professor in a conservatory and - even without giving concerts - I followed learning a lot about guitar, due mainly to the excellence of students who have cooperated with me. But, I confirm, you are right, I am no technician at all - my work with players has developed in the area of interpretation. I have taught people who could play much better than I did even when I was a concert player." rec.music.classical.guitar (31 August 2004)

== List of works ==
=== Solo guitar ===
- Canzone Notturna (1968)
- Estrellas para Estarellas (1970)
- Abreuana (1971)
- Araucaria (1971)
- Appaloosa (1972)
- Luceat (1972)
- Trepidazioni per Thebit (1972)
- Ocram (1973)
- Tenebrae factae sunt (1973)
- Studi di virtuosità e di trascendenza (1981–1988)
- Sonata No. 1 (Omaggio ad Antonio Fontanesi) (1985)
- Sonata No. 2 (Hivern florit) (1986)
- Variazioni sulla Follìa (1989)
- Musica per l'angelo della Melancholìa (1991)
- Variazioni sulla Fortuna (Nell'antologia Fortune 1993) (1991)
- Winterzeit after Robert Schumann (2000)
- Colloquio con Andrés Segovia (2002)
- Sonatine des fleurs et des oiseaux (2002)
- Tríptico de las visiones (2002)
- Catskill Pond (2003)
- La casa del faro (2003)
- Sonata Mediterranea (2004)
- Sonata del Guadalquivir (2004)
- Annunciazione (Omaggio al Beato Angelico) (2004)
- Ikonostas (Omaggio a Pavel Florenskij) (2004)
- Memory of Antinous (Omaggio a Marguerite Yourcenar) (2004)
- A Quiet Song - To the Memory of John W. Duarte (2005)
- Cantico di Gubbio (2007)
- Sonata di Lagonegro (2008)
- Winter Tales (2008; for Russian 7-string guitar)
- Sette Preludi (2012)
- Sonatina de Valparaíso (2015)
- Into the rose-garden - To the Memory of Julian Bream (2020)

=== Guitar and guitar ensemble ===
- Concerto d'estate for guitar and guitar quartet (1992)
- Concierto de Córdoba for guitar and guitar quartet (1993)
- Poema d'inverno for guitar and guitar duo (1994)
- Concerto d'autunno for guitar and small guitar orchestra (1994–1995)
- Feste lontane for four guitars (2007)
- Sonetti giuliani for four guitars (2008)

=== Guitar and orchestra ===
- Leçons de Ténèbres - concerto for guitar and chamber orchestra (1996)
- Fiori di novembre - concerto for mandolin, guitar and chamber orchestra (1997)
- Concerto Italiano for four guitars and orchestra (1998)
- La casa delle ombre - concerto for flute, guitar and strings (1999)
- Liederkonzert for two guitars and chamber orchestra (2000)
- En las tierras altas - concerto for accordion, guitar and strings (2001)
- Star of the Morning for guitar, cello and orchestra (2004)
- Concerto-Serenata for bass clarinet, guitar and strings (2006)
- Concerto di Novgorod for Russian seven-string guitar and orchestra (2006)
- Concerto di Oliena for guitar and orchestra (2007)

=== Chamber music ===
- Preghiere per gli innocenti for voice and guitar (1997)
- Canzoni dimenticate (1999)
- Sonatina-Lied No. 1 for bassoon and guitar (1999)
- Sonatina-Lied No. 2 for violin and guitar (2000)
- Fantasia concertante sul Gran Solo op. 14 di Sor for violin, viola, cello and guitar (2000)
- Retrato de Andrés Segovia for string orchestra (2001)
- Sonata Romantica (Homage to Franz Schubert) for cello and guitar: an elaboration of the piece of the same name by Manuel M. Ponce for solo guitar (2002)
- Retrato de Francisco Tárrega for chamber orchestra with guitar (2004)
- Partita for vibraphone and guitar (2005)
- Sonatina-Lied No. 3 for flute and guitar (2005)
- Iberia (da Albéniz e Tárrega) for flute, viola and guitar (2006)
- Sonatina-Lied No. 4 for mandolin and guitar (2006)
- Quartetto "I castelli d'acqua" for two mandolins, mandola and guitar (2006)
- Sonatina-Lied No. 5 for oboe and guitar (2006)
- Quintetto di Lucedio for guitar and string quartet (2008)
- Trio - Fiori del deserto for flute, viola and guitar (2009)

=== Chitarra Battente ===
- Albero solitario - ricordo della grande pittrice Lucana Maria Padula for Chitarra battente and Guitar (2017) for Cordaminazioni (Marcello De Carolis and Luca Fabrizio)
- Concerto di Matera for chitarra battente and ten instruments (2018) for Marcello De Carolis

== Complete discography ==
=== Gilardino as performer ===
LP:

- Series of Contemporary Guitar Music - Angelo Gilardino plays Haug, Wissmer, Duarte, Tansman, Berkeley
- La Chitarra Nel Secolo XX - Vol. I, Compositori Italiani (Rosetta, Chailly, Maghini, Bettinelli, Mosso)

=== Gilardino's compositions played by others ===
LUIGI ATTADEMO - plays "Variazioni sulla Follìa" CD "Folías" Guitart Collection Guit 2026 www.luigiattademo.it

GIANLUCA BARBERO plays "Studio n. 6 – Soledad - Omaggio a Francisco Goya" "Studio n. 47 – Le rose sulla neve – In memoriam Eso Peluzzi" Map – Lr Cd 116

LUIGI BISCALDI and QUARTETTO DI ASTI plays "Concerto d'estate" per chitarra sola e quartetto di chitarre "Concierto de Córdoba" para guitarra solista y cuarteto de guitarras BERCD 833-2 Bèrben

PIERO BONAGURI esegue "Colloquio con Andrés Segovia" "Pocci 2004" Guitar Reference VP Music Media

Guitarist MICHAEL BRACKEN plays "Sonata n. 2 – Hivern Florit" "Good News" Atma Disques

TRIO CITHAROEDIA plays "Poema d'inverno" per tre chitarre "Ferenc Farkas, Angelo Gilardino Complete works for Guitar Trio" NIC 1051 - Guitart Collection

ANGELO COLONE plays "Studio n. 18 – Omaggio a de Falla" "Sintesi" Map – Lr Cd 087

ANGELO COLONE esegue plays "Tema con variazioni (Omaggio a Fernando Sor)" "Già la pioggia è con noi (Omaggio a Salvatore Quasimodo)" "Sacrificio" (Omaggio ad Agustin Barrios Mangoré) "Concerto per chitarra e orchestra da camera – Leçons de Ténèbres" "Jondo (Omaggio a Joaquin Turina) "Soledad (Omaggio a Francisco Goya) "Paesaggio lucano (Omaggio al pittore Mauro Masi)" CD "Angelo Angelo" www.angelocolone.it

MARCO DE SANTI plays "Quattro Studi di virtuosità e di trascendenza" "Ocram" EMI I.071

SAM DESMET plays "Tema con variazioni" (Omaggio a Fernando Sor) "Elegia di marzo" (Omaggio a Juan Ramón Jiménez) CD "study< >study" first string www.samdesmet.com

WILLIAM FEASLEY plays "Soledad (Omaggio a Francisco Goya)" "Echoes of Goya" SONORA SO22587CD

FABIO FEDERICO plays "Elegia di marzo" "Mediterranea" "Alleluia" "El rosario" "Jondo" CD "Estudios" Etnoworld Classical www.fabiofederico.com

REZA GANJAVI plays "Canzoni Dimenticate" per varie formazioni a duo con chitarra CD "In Friendship"

TILMAN HOPPSTOCK plays "Etude n. 3" CD "The 20th Century Guitar" Signum SigX90-00

LUIGI GIFFI plays "Elegia di marzo" "Sacrificio" "Quattuor in Musica"

MARTHA MASTERS plays "Colloquio con Andrés Segovia" CD "Viaggio in Italia" GSP1031CD

LUCIO MATARAZZO plays "Quattro Studi di virtuosità e di trascendenza" CD "LM & friends" CD GUITART COLLECTION

ALBERTO MESIRCA plays "Annunciazione – Omaggio al Beato Angelico" "Ikonostas – Omaggio a Pavel Florenskij "Ikonostas" Map – Lr Cd 112

LORENZO MICHELI plays "Canzone notturna" "Autumn of the soul" Contrastes Records CR 9291409

MICHAEL PARTINGTON plays "Studio n. 12 (Omaggio a Prokofiev)" "20th Century Guitar" Roserecord Rose 1004CD

CRISTIANO PORQUEDDU plays "Sonata n. 2 - Hivern Florit" "Embarquement pour Cithère" "Omaggio a Sergej Prokof'ev" "Les arbres rouges" Seicorde 188IT www.cristianoporqueddu.com

CRISTIANO PORQUEDDU plays "Studies 1-12" CD Trascendentia Vol.I Seicorde 188IT www.trascendentia.com

CRISTIANO PORQUEDDU plays "Studies 13-24" Trascendentia Vol.II Seicorde 188IT www.trascendentia.com

CRISTIANO PORQUEDDU plays "Studies 25-36" Trascendentia Vol.III Seicorde 188IT www.trascendentia.com

CRISTIANO PORQUEDDU plays "Studies 37-48" Trascendentia Vol IV Seicorde SNR019 www.trascendentia.com

CRISTIANO PORQUEDDU plays "Studies 49-60" Trascendentia Vol V www.trascendentia.com

MARCELLO RIVELLI plays "Sonata n. 2 - Hivern Florit" Guitart Collection Guit 2030

GIANLUCA SABBADIN plays "Studio n. 47 – Le rose sulla neve" "Studio n, 18 – El rosario" "Studio n. 4 – Elegia di marzo" CD "Recital per chitarra sola"

GIULIO TAMPALINI plays "Works for Guitar 2002-2004" www.giuliotampalini.it

CORDAMINAZIONI (MARCELLO DE CAROLIS - LUCA FABRIZIO) plays "Albero solitario - ricordo della grande pittrice lucana Maria Padula" www.cordaminazioni.com

== Sources ==
- Annala, Hannu and Mätlik, Heiki, "Gilardino, Angelo", Handbook of Guitar and Lute Composers, Mel Bay Publications, 2008, p. 77. ISBN 0-7866-5844-4
- Colonna, Maurizio, "Gilardino, Angelo" in Chitarristi-compositori del XX secolo: le idee e le loro conseguenze, F. Muzzio, 1990, p. 315. ISBN 88-7021-537-7
- Guitar Foundation of America, Artistic Achievement Award (2009): Angelo Gilardino
- "Si è spento a 80 anni Angelo Gilardino, il più grande musicista vercellese dall'inizio del '900" [Angelo Gilardino, the greatest Vercelli musician since the beginning of the 20th century, has passed away at the age of 80]. TgVercelli (in Italian). Vercelli. 14 January 2022.
