= Bruno Bartolozzi =

Italian composer

Bruno Bartolozzi (8 June 1911 – 12 December 1980) was an Italian composer and pioneer in the development of extended techniques for wind instruments.

He was born in Florence.

== Selected works ==
=== Concerti with orchestra ===
- Concerto for orchestra
- Concerto for violin, string orchestra and harpsichord
- Concerto No. 2 for violin and orchestra
- Memorie for three guitars and orchestra

=== Vocal music ===
- Sentimento del sogno for soprano and orchestra
- Immagine for soprano and 17 executors
- Tres requerdos del cielo for bass and various instruments

=== Chamber music ===
- Tre pezzi for guitar
- Serenata for violin and guitar
- Musica a cinque for violin, viola, trombone, bassoon and guitar
- Variazioni for solo violin
- Due studi for violin
- Andamenti for viola
- Cantilena for flute in G
- Collage for solo oboe
- Collage for solo bassoon
- Sinaudolodia for four flutes
- The Hollow Man for wind instruments
- Omaggio a Gaetano Azzolina for guitar
- Musica per Piero for two violas
- Auser for oboe and guitar
- Collage for solo clarinet
- Repitu flute, viola, guitar and percussion
- Madrigale di Gesualdo for accordion
- Per Olga for solo flute
- Adles for guitar
- The Solitary for oboe and percussion
- Atma for three groups of solo instruments
- Risonanze for 18 instruments
- String Quartet No. 1
- String Quartet No. 2

=== Concertazioni ===
The series of Concertazioni includes:

- Concertazioni for bassoon, strings and percussion
- Concertazioni for oboe and other instruments
- Concertazioni a quattro for flute, oboe, clarinet and bassoon
- Concertazioni for B-flat clarinet and other instruments

=== Piano music ===
- Estri del Fa Diesis for piano

=== Stage works ===
- Tutto ciò che accade ti riguarda

=== Methods and didactic works ===
- New sounds for Woodwinds. London: Oxford University Press.
- Nuovi suoni per i legni. Milan: Edizioni Suvini Zerboni.
- Metodo per oboe (with Lawrence Singer). Milan: Edizioni Suvini Zerboni.
- Metodo per clarinetto (with Giuseppe Garbarino). Milan: Edizioni Suvini Zerboni.
- Metodo per fagotto (with Sergio Penazzi). Milan: Edizioni Suvini Zerboni.
- Metodo per flauto (with Pierluigi Mencarelli). Milan: Edizioni Suvini Zerboni.
