= Classical guitar repertoire =

Set of available musical works for classical guitar

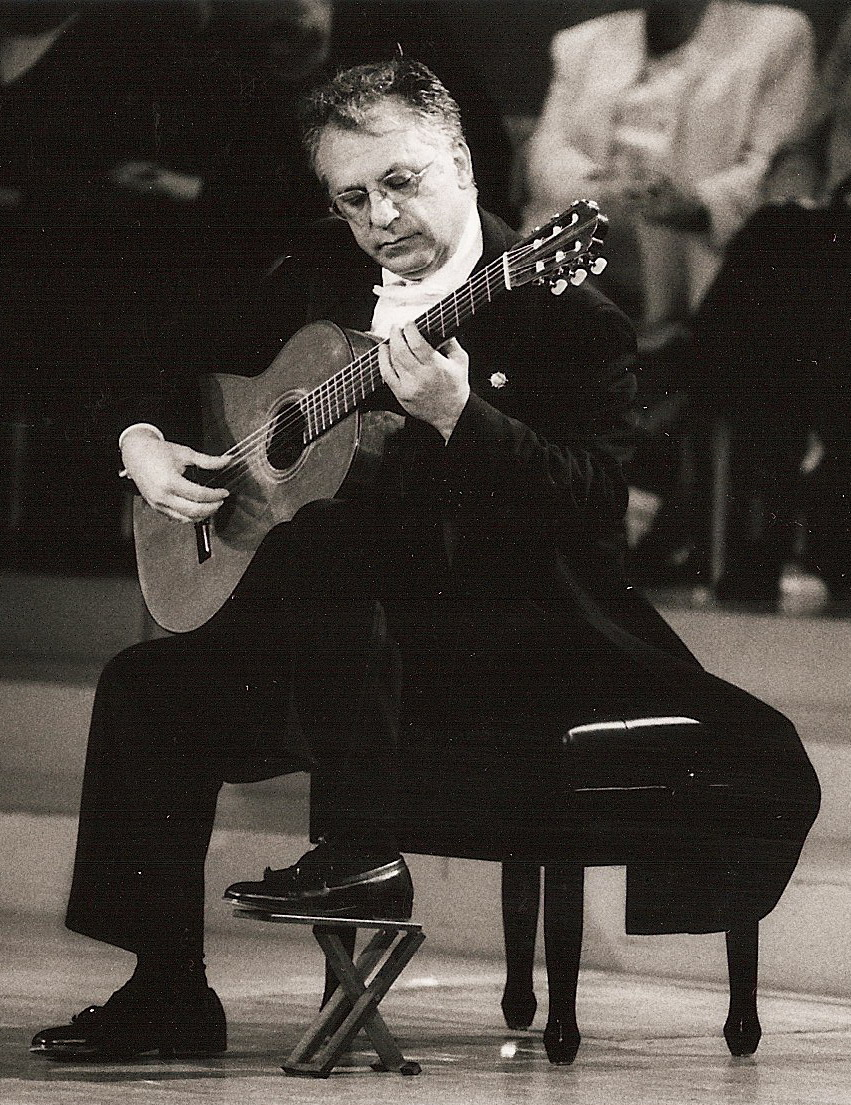
Pepe Romero in concert 2000

To a greater extent than most other instruments and ensembles, it is difficult to compose music for the guitar without either proficiency in the instrument or close collaboration with a guitarist. As a result, a large part of the guitar repertoire consists of works by guitarists who did not compose extensively for other instruments. Music prior to the classical era was often composed for performance on various combinations of instruments, and could be adapted by the performer to keyboard instruments, the lute, or the guitar. Since the beginning of the 20th century, however, a significant amount of music has been written for the guitar by non-guitarist composers.

== Repertoire ==
=== Renaissance era ===
During the Renaissance, the guitar was likely to have been used as it frequently is today, to provide strummed accompaniment for a singer or a small group. There also were several significant music collections published during the sixteenth century of contrapuntal compositions approaching the complexity, sophistication and breadth of lute music from the same time period. These works are intended for the vihuela, which differs in tuning with respect to both the renaissance and modern guitar.

Main compositions and composers for the vihuela:

- El Maestro by Luis de Milán (1536)
- Los Seys libros del Delphin de Musica by Luis de Narváez (1538)
- Tres Libros de Música by Alonso Mudarra (1546)
- Silva de Sirenas by Enríquez de Valderrábano (1547)
- Libro de Música de Vihuela by Diego Pisador (1552)
- Orphénica Lyra by Miguel de Fuenllana (1554)
- El Parnasso by Estevan Daça (1576).

=== Baroque era ===
Baroque music describes an era and a set of styles of European classical music which were in widespread use between approximately 1600 to 1750 (see Dates of classical music eras for a discussion of the problems inherent in defining the beginning and end points). This era is said to begin in music after the Renaissance and to be followed by the Classical music era. The original meaning of "baroque" is "irregularly shaped pearl", a strikingly fitting characterization of the architecture and design of this period; later, the name came to be applied also to its music. It is associated with composers such as J.S. Bach, George Friedrich Händel, Antonio Vivaldi, and Claudio Monteverdi. During the period, music theory, diatonic tonality, and imitative counterpoint developed. More elaborate musical ornamentation, as well as changes in musical notation and advances in the way instruments were played also appeared. Baroque music would see an expansion in the size, range and complexity of performance, as well as increasingly complex forms.

Main composers for the baroque guitar:

- Francesco Corbetta (1615–1681)
- Angelo Michele Bartolotti (?–1682)
- Gaspar Sanz (1640–1710, Spain)
- Ludovico Roncalli (1654–1713)
- Robert de Visée (c.1655–c.1735, France)
- Santiago de Murcia (1673–1739)

=== Classical era ===
- Luigi Boccherini (1743–1805)
- Ferdinando Carulli (1770–1841)
- Salvador Castro de Gistau (1770–18XX)
- Fernando Ferandiere (1771–1816)
- Francois de Fossa (1775–1849)
- Mauro Giuliani (1781–1829)
- Antoine de Lhoyer (1768–1852)
- Wenzel Thomas Matiegka (1773–1830)
- Francesco Molino (1768–1847)
- Pierre Jean Porro (1750–1831)
- Fernando Sor (1778–1839)

=== Romantic era ===
Main composers of the early romantic era:

- Carl Maria von Weber (1786–1826): Weber's Last Waltz
- Niccolò Paganini (1782–1840): Several virtuoso pieces specifically for the guitar

==== The Golden Age ====
The first 'Golden Age' of the classical guitar repertoire was the 19th century. Some notable guitar composers from this period are:

- Dionisio Aguado (1784–1849)
- Julián Arcas (1832–1882)
- José Broca (1805–1882)
- Matteo Carcassi (1792–1853)
- Napoléon Coste (1806–1883)
- Anton Diabelli (1781–1858)
- Mauro Giuliani (1781–1829)
- Luigi Legnani (1790–1877)
- Johann Kaspar Mertz (1806–1856)
- Giulio Regondi (1822–1872)
- Francisco Tárrega (1852–1909)
- Marco Aurelio Zani de Ferranti (1800–1878)
- José Ferrer (1835–1916)

=== Modern era ===
Some genres of modern music include atonal music, which rejects the tonal system of nearly all other musical styles, as well as aleatoric, which rejects the absolutism of the composer and allows the player to take an active role in how the piece is played. For example, in Leo Brouwer's Étude No. 20, he supplies a series of melodies that increase in length, and he invites the player to play each section of the melody as many times as he or she chooses. Regional styles are also prevalent in modern guitar music, such as the music of Latin America, where unique harmonies and fresh material can be found.

==== Guitarist–composers of the 20th century ====
Magoado
Choro "Magoado", composed and recorded (in 1930) by João Pernambuco.

- Heinrich Albert (1870–1950)
- Sergio Assad (born 1952)
- Agustín Barrios Mangoré (1885–1944)
- Ángel Barrios Fernandez (1882–1964)
- Paulo Bellinati (born 1950)
- Gilbert Biberian (born 1944)
- Dusan Bogdanovic (born 1955)
- Leo Brouwer (born 1939)
- Abel Carlevaro (1918–2002)
- Carlo Domeniconi (born 1947)
- John W. Duarte (1919–2004)
- Roland Dyens (1955–2016)
- Dimitris Fampas (1921–1996)
- Abel Fleury (1903–1958)
- Stephen Funk–Pearson (born 1949)
- Garoto (Anibal Augusto Sardinha) (1915–1945)
- Angelo Gilardino (1941-2022)
- Stephen Goss (born 1964)
- Brian Head (born 1965)
- Bruno Henze (1900–1978)
- Carl Henze (1872–1946)
- Tilman Hopstock (born 1961)
- Vojislav Ivanovic (born 1959)
- David A. Jaffe (born 1955)
- Bryan Johanson (born 1951)
- Avril Kinsey (born 1955)
- Francis Kleynjans (born 1951)
- Nikita Koshkin (born 1956)
- Annette Kruisbrink (born 1958)
- Andrei Krylov (born 1961)
- Antonio Lauro (1917–1986)
- Miguel Llobet (1878–1938)
- Celso Machado (born 1953)
- José Luis Merlin (born 1952)
- Behzad Mirkhani (born 1969)
- Gentil Montaña (1942–2011)
- Jorge Morel (born 1931)
- Darko Nikčević (born 1971)
- Anatolij Olshanskij (born 1956)
- Atanas, Ourkouzounov (born 1970)
- Marco Pereira (born 1950)
- João Pernambuco (1883–1947)
- Máximo Diego Pujol (born 1957)
- Štěpán Rak (born 1945)
- Brad Richter (born 1969)
- Rodrigo Riera (1923–1999)
- Eduardo Sainz de la Maza (1903–1982)
- Regino Sainz de la Maza (1896–1981)
- Reginald Smith Brindle (1917–2003)
- Eric Sessler (born 1969)
- Anton Stingl (1908–2000)
- Eythor Thorlaksson (1930–2018)
- Dietmar Ungerank (born 1950)
- Benjamin Verdery (born 1955)
- Heitor Villa–Lobos (1887–1959)
- Andrew York (born 1958)
- Alan Willcocks (1869–1956)
- Anthony Sidney (1952)

==== Other composers for the classical guitar ====
In the 20th century, many non–guitarist composers wrote for the instrument, which previously only players of the instrument had done. For a larger list of composers who have written for the solo guitar, see the list of composers for the classical guitar. Some of the better–known are:

- Hermann Ambrosius (1897–1983)
- Louis Andriessen (1939–2021)
- Malcolm Arnold (1921–2006)
- Boris Asafiev (1884–1949)
- Vicente Asencio (1908–1979)
- Georges Auric (1899–1983)
- Milton Babbitt (1916–2011)
- Robert Beaser (born 1954)
- Richard Rodney Bennett (1936–2012)
- Niels Viggo Bentzon (1919–2000)
- Luciano Berio (1925–2003)
- Lennox Berkeley (1903–1989)
- Benjamin Britten (1913–1976)
- Elliott Carter (1908–2012)
- Tristram Cary (1925–2008)
- Mario Castelnuovo–Tedesco (1895–1968)
- Peter Maxwell Davies (1934–2016)
- Stephen Dodgson (1924–2013)
- Petr Eben (1929–2007)
- Manuel de Falla (1876–1946)
- Michael Finnissy (born 1946)
- Jean Françaix (1912–1997)
- Roberto Gerhard (1896–1970)
- Giorgio Federico Ghedini (1892–1965)
- Alberto Ginastera (1916–1983)
- Cristóbal Halffter (1930–2021)
- Hans Werner Henze (1926–2012)
- Theodor Hlouschek (1923–2010)
- Vagn Holmboe (1909–1996)
- Antonio José (1902–1936)
- Ernst Krenek (1900–1991)
- Gian Francesco Malipiero 1882–1973
- Frank Martin (1890–1974)
- Nicholas Maw (1935–2009)
- Darius Milhaud (1892–1974)
- Federico Mompou (1893–1987)
- Federico Moreno Torroba (1891–1982)
- Lior Navok (born 1971)
- Per Nørgård (1932–2025)
- Maurice Ohana (1914–1992)
- Goffredo Petrassi (1904–2003)
- Ástor Piazzolla (1921–1992)
- Manuel M. Ponce (1882–1948)
- Francis Poulenc (1899–1963)
- André Previn (1929–2019)
- Einojuhani Rautavaara (born 1928)
- Alan Rawsthorne (1905–1971)
- George Rochberg (1918–2005)
- Joaquín Rodrigo (1901–1999)
- Ned Rorem (1923–2022)
- Albert Roussel (1869–1937)
- Poul Ruders (born 1949)
- John Rutter (born 1945)
- Henri Sauguet (1901–1989)
- Ananda Sukarlan (born 1968)
- Toru Takemitsu (1930–1996)
- Alexandre Tansman (1897–1986)
- Michael Tippett (1905–1998)
- Joaquín Turina (1882–1949)
- Pēteris Vasks (born 1946)
- William Walton (1902–1983)

=== Contemporary era ===
==== Solo compositions ====
- Robert Beaser – Shenandoah
- Luciano Berio – Sequenza XI
- Benjamin Britten – Nocturnal after John Dowland
- Howard J. Buss – Dances and Interludes, 2018 (Brixton Publications)
- Roland Chadwick – Song and Dance Nos. 1, 2 & 3
- Constantinos Chizaris – Guitariana
- Pascale Criton – La Ritournelle et le galop for 1/16th tone tuned guitar
- Manuel de Falla – Pour le tombeau de Claude Debussy
- Brian Ferneyhough – Kurze Schatten II
- Alberto Ginastera – Sonata
- Sofia Gubaidulina – Serenade
- Bruno Maderna – Y Después
- Julian Mock – Ecstatic Mechanism
- Tristan Murail – Tellur
- Lior Navok – Remembrances of Jerusalem; Six for a Dance; Meditation
- Maurice Ohana – Tiento
- Marco Pereira – Samba Urbano
- William Walton – Five Bagatelles
- Hans Werner Henze – Royal Winter Music
- Ananda Sukarlan – The 5 Lovers of Drupadi
- Anton Del Forno – Guitar Concerto
- Eric Sessler – Sonata No. 1; Rhapsody & Afterglow; Bombadiliana

== Transcriptions ==
- Roland Dyens (born 1955)
- Eliot Fisk (born 1958) (US / Austria) Luciano Berio
- Tilman Hoppstock (born 1961) (Germany) Béla Bartók
- Carlo Marchione (born 1964) (Italy) Georg Philipp Telemann
- Behzad Mirkhani (born 1969) (Iran)
- Andrés Segovia (1893–1987)
- Francisco Tárrega (Spanish) – Johann Sebastian Bach
- Kazuhito Yamashita (1961)

== Guitarists for whom many pieces have been composed ==
- Andrés Segovia (1893–1987) (Spain)
- Alexandre Lagoya and Ida Presti
- Julian Bream (1933–2020)
- John Williams (born 1941) (Australia)
- Christopher Parkening (born 1947) (United States)
- Magnus Andersson (born 1955) (Sweden)
- Eliot Fisk (United States)
- Adam Holzman (guitarist) (United States)
- Heike Matthiesen (Germany)
- Ricardo Gallen (Spain)
- David Russell
- David Starobin (United States)
- David Tanenbaum (United States)
- Pablo Gomez (Mexico)
- Sharon Isbin (United States)
- Sanel Redzic (Bosnia and Herzegovina)
- Alirio Díaz (1923–2016) (Venezuela)

== See also ==
- List of composers for the classical guitar
- List of compositions for guitar
