= John Griffiths (musician) =

Australian musician (born 1952)

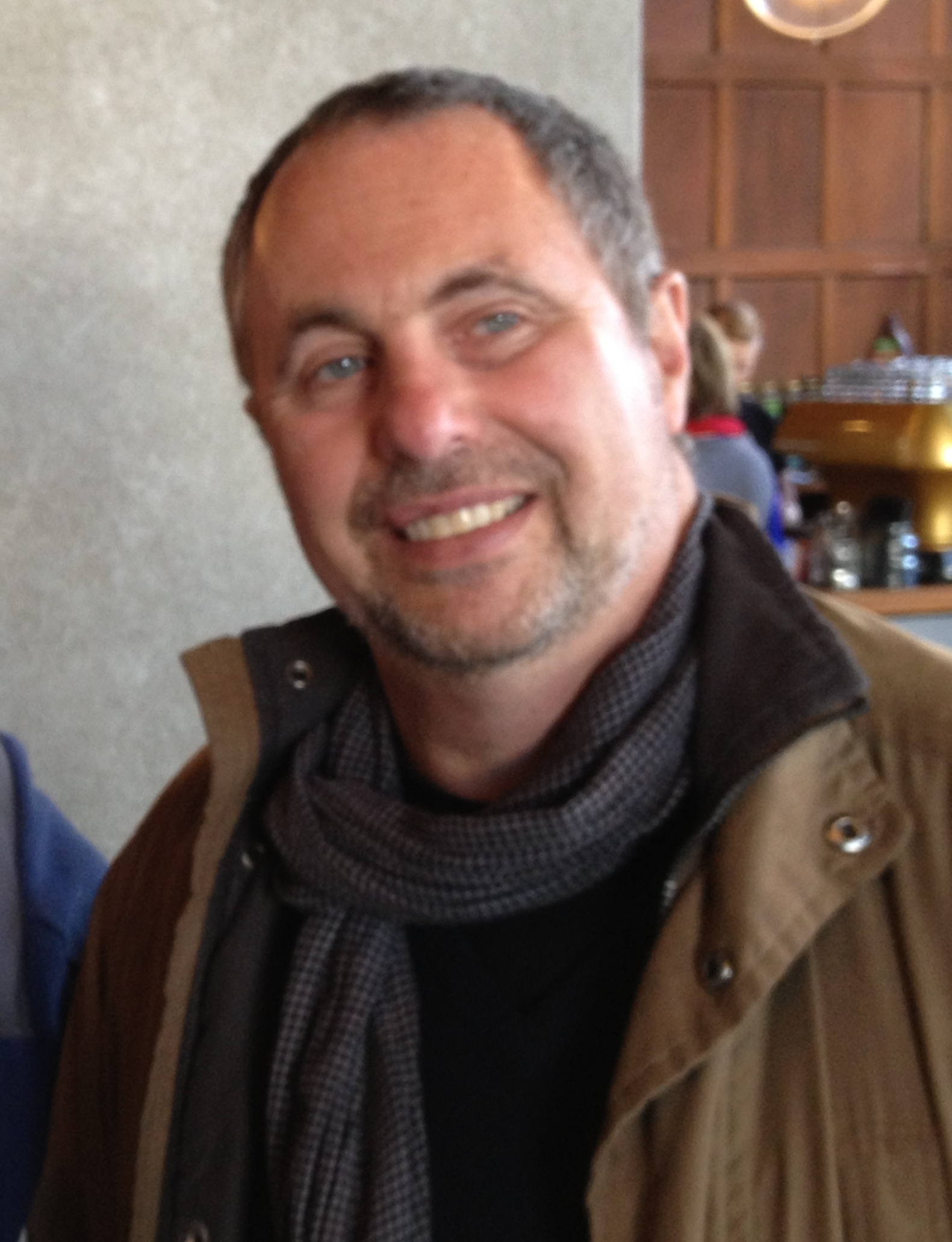
John Griffiths in 2013

John Griffiths AM FAHA (born 2 December 1952, Melbourne) is a musician and musicologist specialised in music for guitar and early plucked instruments, especially the vihuela and lute. He has researched aspects of the sixteenth-century Spanish vihuela, its history and its music. He has also had an international career as a solo lutenist, vihuelist, and guitarist, and as a member of the pioneer Australian early music group La Romanesca. After a thirty-year career at the University of Melbourne (1980–2011), he now works as a freelance scholar and performer.

== Career ==
Griffiths graduated from Monash University in Melbourne (Australia) with a Bachelor of Arts degree and a PhD in 1984. From childhood he also studied guitar, initially with his father and then with Susan Ellis, Sadie Bishop and Sam Dunn during his school years. After completing his BA, he continued his performance studies in Germany with Siegfried Behrend and in Spain with José Luis Lopátegui. He also studied lute and vihuela performance at the Schola Cantorum Basiliensis with Hopkinson Smith and Eugen M. Dombois. His doctoral thesis on the Vihuela Fantasia established him as a leading scholar of early Spanish instrumental music. This has remained one of the principal areas of his research, alongside broader work on Spanish music and on European music for lute and related instruments.

From 1980 until 2011, Griffiths was on the staff of the Faculty of Music (now Conservatorium of Music) at the University of Melbourne, as director of early music for the entire period, and as head of the School of Music in 1991. He was appointed to a chair of music in 1995, and in 1996 founded the Early Music Studio at the university which he directed until June 2011. In 2007 he also established the Lyrebird Press at the University of Melbourne to continue the legacy of Louise Hanson Dyer, the Melbourne philanthropist and arts patron who founded Éditions de l'Oiseau-Lyre in Paris in 1932. This press continues to publish monuments of Australian music from the nineteenth and twentieth centuries, as well as works by obscure European composers of the Renaissance, Baroque, and Classical periods. Since July 2011, he has been a professorial fellow in the School of Languages and Linguistics at the University of Melbourne. He is also co-director of the Corpus des Luthistes project at the Centre d'Etudes Supérieures de la Renaissance in Tours, vice-president of the Sociedad de la Vihuela in Spain, and chair of the "Tablature in Western Music" study group of the International Musicological Society. In 1993 he was made an Officer of the Order of Isabella the Catholic by King Juan Carlos I of Spain.

As a performer, Griffiths has appeared around the world as a soloist and as a member of the ensemble La Romanesca that he founded in 1978 with Hartley Newnham, Ros Bandt and Ruth Wilkinson. He tends to treat many of his solo performances as an extension of his research work, and as an opportunity to present newly discovered works, or new interpretations of established repertory. He has taught for many years in summer schools in Spain, especially the Festival Internacional de Guitarra in Córdoba, and Festival Internacional de Música Antigua de Daroca.

Among his publications are new editions of early sources of music for vihuela and lute, studies on interpretation, music analysis, tablature printing in the renaissance, and the role of plucked instruments in Renaissance society. He has contributed articles on the vihuela and many related areas to the major reference works The New Grove Dictionary of Music and Musicians, Die Musik in Geschichte und Gegenwart, and the Diccionario de la Música Española e Hispanoamericana. His work on the life and music of the vihuelist Esteban Daza is particularly noteworthy as is his work on music printing in Spain.

In the 2019 Australia Day Honours Griffiths was made a Member of the Order of Australia (AM) for "significant service to music education as an academic and musicologist, and to professional societies". He was elected a Fellow of the Australian Academy of the Humanities in 2006.

== Bibliography ==
(select list)

- “Juan Bermudo, Self-Instruction and the Amateur Instrumentalist". Music Education in the Middle Ages and the Renaissance. Ed. Russell Murray Jr, Susan Forscher Weiss, and Cynthia J. Cyrus. Bloomington: Indiana University Press, 2010. 126–137.
- “The Alphonsine Encyclopaedia of Music” Imagination, Books and Community in Medieval Europe: Papers of a Conference held at the State Library of Victoria, Melbourne, Australia, 29–31 May 2008. Ed Gregory Kratzmann. Melbourne: Macmillan & State Library of Victoria, 2010. 221–230.
- “Las vihuelas en la época de Isabel la Católica” Cuadernos de Música Iberoamericana 20 (July–December 2010): 7–36.
- “La producción de libros de cifra musical en España durante el siglo XVI” Hispanica Lyra 12 (2010): 10–27.
- “Hidalgo, merchant, poet, priest: the vihuela in the urban soundscape”. Early Music 37 (2009): 355–366.
- Cosimo Bottegari: Il libro di canto e liuto / The Song and Lute Book. Biblioteca Musica Bononiensis, Sezione IV, Nº 98. Bologna: Arnaldo Forni Editore, 2006. (with Dinko Fabris)
- “Printing the Art of Orpheus: Vihuela Tablatures in Sixteenth-Century Spain”. Early Music Printing and Publishing in the Iberian World. Ed. Iain Fenlon and Tess Knighton. De Musica 11. Kassel: Edition Reichenberger, 2006. 181–214.
- “The Two Renaissances of the vihuela — Los dos renacimientos de la vihuela”. Goldberg 33 (April 2005): 34–43.
- Neapolitan Lute Music: Fabrizio Dentice, Giulio Severino, Giovanni Antonio Severino, Francesco Cardone. Recent Researches in Music of the Renaissance 140. Madison: A-R Editions, 2004. (with Dinko Fabris)
- Políticas y Prácticas musicales en el mundo de Felipe II: Estudios sobre la música en España, sus instituciones y sus territorios en la segunda mitad del siglo XVI. Madrid: Instituto Complutense de Ciencias Musicales, 2004. (with Javier Suárez-Pajares)
- “L’essor et le déclin de la vihuela”. Au origins de la guitare: la vihuela de mano. Ed. Joel Dugot. Les cahiers du Musée de la Musique, 5. Paris: Musée de la Musique, 2004. 8–15.
- Tañer vihuela según Juan Bermudo. Zaragoza: Institución Fernando el Católico, 2003. (digitally republished in 2010 and also available on-line at "Playing the Vihuela According to Juan Bermudo". Archived from the original on 29 August 2011.)
- "Improvisation and Composition in the Vihuela Songs of Luis Milán and Alonso Mudarra". Gesäng zur Laute, ed. Nicole Schwindt. TroJa – Trossingen Jahrbuch für Musikforschung 2. (Kassel: Bärenreiter, 2003). 111-32.
- “Strategies for the Recovery of Guitar Music of the Early Seventeenth Century”. Rime e suoni alla spagnola. Atti della giornata internazionale dei studi sulla chitarra barocca. Ed Giulia Veneziano. Secoli d’oro – Comparatistica, 33. Florence: Alinea Editrice, 2003. 59–81.
- “The Lute and the Polyphonist”. Studi Musicali 31 (2002), 71–90.
- “The Vihuela: performance practice, style and context”. Lute, Guitar, and Vihuela: Historical Performance and Modern Interpretation. Ed Victor Coelho. Cambridge Studies in Performance Practice. Cambridge: CUP, 1997. 158-79.
- “Esteban Daza: A middle-class musician in renaissance Spain". Early Music 22 (1995): 437–48.
- "The printing of instrumental music in sixteenth-century Spain" Revista de Musicología, 16 (1993): 3309–21
- "Santa Maria and the Printing of Instrumental Music in Sixteenth-Century Spain". Livro de homenagem a Macario Santiago Kastner. Ed. Maria Fernanda Cidrais Rodrigues, Manuel Morais, Rui Veiera Nery. Lisbon: Fundaçao Calouste Gulbenkian, 1992. 345-60. (with W. E. Hultberg)
- “At Court and at Home with the vihuela de mano: Current Perspectives of the Instrument, its Music and Its World”. Journal of the Lute Society of America 22 (1989): 1–27.
- “La música renacentista para instrumentos solistas y el gusto musical español”. Nassarre: Revista Aragonesa de Musicología 4 (1988): 59–78.
- “La ‘Fantasía que contrahaze la harpa’ de Alonso Mudarra; estudio histórico-analítico". Revista de Musicología 9(1986): 29–40.
- Esteban Daza. The Fantasias for Vihuela. Recent Researches in Music of the Renaissance, 54. Madison: A-R Editions, 1982.

== Discography ==
- Monodies. La Romanesca. Move Records MD3044, 2005 [Part new, partial reissue of 1982 recording]
- I am Music: works by Francesco Landini (c.1325–1397). The Ensemble of the Fourteenth Century, directed by J. Griffiths and J. Stinson. The Music of the Fourteenth Century, vol. 2. MD3093. Move Records, 1997.
- The Echo of Orpheus: Vihuela Music of Renaissance Spain. Move Records MD 3092, 1995
- An Iberian Triangle: Music of Christian, Jewish and Moorish Spain before 1492. La Romanesca. Move Records MD 3114, 1992.
- Every Delight and Fair Pleasure:The Music of Northern Italy. The Ensemble of the Fourteenth Century, directed by J. Griffiths and J. Stinson. The Music of the Fourteenth Century, vol. 2. MD3092. Move Records, 1991.
- Two Gentlemen of Verona. The Ensemble of the Fourteenth Century, directed by J. Griffiths and J. Stinson. The Music of the Fourteenth Century, vol. 1. MD3091. Move Records, 1987.
- Medieval Monodies. La Romanesca. Move Records MS3044, 1982. Reissued on Compact Disc 1988
- Love Lyrics and Romances of Renaissance Spain. La Romanesca. Move Records MS3034, 1980.
