= Gary Schocker =

American flutist, composer, and pianist (born 1959)

- Born: October 18, 1959 (age 65)
- Genres: Classical
- Occupation(s): Musician, composer
- Instrument(s): Flute, piano
- Website: https://www.garyschocker.com

Gary Schocker (born October 18, 1959) is an American flutist, composer, and pianist who has performed with the New York Philharmonic (at age 15, in a nationally televised Young People's Concert), the Philadelphia Orchestra, the New Jersey Symphony, the Dallas Symphony, the West German Sinfonia, and I Solisti Italiani. He has toured and taught in Colombia, Panama, Canada, Australia, Taiwan, Japan, Germany, France, and Italy.

== Composing ==
He is the most-published living composer of flute music with over 200 works in print. Flutist James Galway premiered his three-movement concerto Green Places at Ireland's Adair Festival and has also performed this work with the New Jersey Symphony. In 2015, classical guitarist Jason Vieaux and harpist Yolanda Kondonassis commissioned Schocker's "Hypnotized", a five-movement work for guitar and harp which can be heard on their recording, Together.

Schocker has composed sonatas for piccolo, piano, oboe, bassoon, clarinet, horn, and two pianos, as well as works for flute, many songs, theatrical works, and children's musicals. His musicals, written with Barbara Campbell, include Far from the Madding Crowd and The Awakening, both of which can be heard on Original Cast Recordings. Both shows were winners of the Global Search for New Musicals in the UK and were performed in Cardiff and at the Edinburgh Festival, as well as in New Zealand. In New York, they were winners of the ASCAP music theatre awards. In 2008 he was commissioned to compose the contest piece, titled Biwako Wind, for the Biwako International Flute Competition.

== Performing ==
As a flutist, Schocker has performed often in Japan and Taiwan. In August 2015, he performed his Concerti Green Places and Hannah's Glade at the 17th Japan Flute Convention, where he also performed in recital with pianist Fumi Kuwajima, playing works from their album Inside Out (2015). He performed at the Taiwan International Flute Festival in 2012, also playing three of his works for flute and orchestra.

Since 2003, Schocker has taught master classes at Holy Cross Monastery in New York which bring together flutists from all over the world. He is on the faculty at New York University and teaches privately in New York City and in Easton, Pennsylvania. He performs on flutes made by William S. Haynes and Louis Lot. He also plays on headjoints made by David Williams (the Gary Schocker headjoint) and David Chu.

== Awards and honors ==
He won the National Flute Association's Young Artist Competition in 1978, the New York Flute Club's Young Artist Competition in 1980, and the Young Concert Artists International Auditions in 1985.

Schocker has won the International Clarinet Association's annual composition competition twice and the National Flute Association's annual Newly Published Music Award numerous times.

== Discography ==
=== Solo ===
- Bach Handel Telemann (Chesky)
- Mozart Flute Quartets (Chesky)
- Flute Forest (2004)
- Regrets and Resolutions (1986)
- Airborne (2000)
- The Awakening and Far from the Madding Crowd (2000)
- Healing Music (Azica)
- Garden in Harp (Azica, 2012)
- For Dad (Azica)
- Inside Out (CD Baby, 2015)

=== Duet ===
With Jason Vieaux

- Arioso (2004)
- Dream Travels (2002)
