= Eric Sessler =

American composer and educator

Eric Sessler is an American composer and educator. Among his collaborations are works written for Anthony & Demarre McGill; Grammy Award winner Jason Vieaux; Philadelphia Orchestra principal flutist Jeffrey Khaner; organist Alan Morrison; the Dover Quartet; harpist Yolanda Kondonassis; and the flute & guitar duo of Bonita Boyd & Nicholas Goluses.

Also a composer of educational works, he has written music for youth orchestra, wind ensemble, narration and voice for young minds and musicians. Sessler teaches at the Curtis Institute of Music and the Juilliard School, Pre-College and he is a trained classical guitarist.

== Reception ==
"Sessler's 2013 String Quartet, whose first movement was full of reverberations and refractions on optimism and sincerity, and the same kind of American vibe that infused Barber" was written by Peter Dobrin in The Philadelphia Inquirer. While Victor L. Schermer added, "Sessler achieved a delicate balance between the rounded romantic development of mood and motif and a post-modern sense of music that’s paradoxically linear in its non-linearity and constant in its change— a song without a singer." For the release of the recording of Organ Concerto, Phil Muse of Sequenza 21 wrote, "The main reason for excitement on the release of this new album is that it is the recording debut of Eric Sessler’s scintillating new (2006) Organ concerto. The work itself is a stunning conception, being both a display piece for the organ and a solid concert work for the orchestra, which remains an equal partner with the soloist throughout the 18-minute piece, so that it is an organ concerto in every sense of the word"

== Selected works ==
- Varuna's Light for Yolanda Kondonassis & Jason Vieaux
- Swan Songs for Anthony & Demarre McGill
- Flute Concerto for Jeffrey Khaner & the Cincinnati Chamber Orchestra
- Organ Concerto for Alan Morrison & the Curtis Symphony Orchestra
- String Quartet for the Dover Quartet
- Sawmill Sunshine (flute & piano)
- Fantasy (organ)
- Gold (variations for string orchestra)
- Piano Quartet
- Duo for Harp & Oboe

=== Selected guitar works ===
- Rhapsody & Afterglow for Jason Vieaux (solo guitar)
- Sonata No. 1 for Jason Vieaux (solo guitar)
- Shift and Riff (guitar quartet)
- Hammerhead for Bonita Boyd & Nicholas Goluses (flute & guitar)
- Sonata for Harp & Guitar
- Good Words to You (voice & guitar)
- Bombadiliana (solo guitar)

=== Selected educational works ===
- Beyond Earth (wind ensemble)
- Toward a Bright Future (youth orchestra)
- Loughran's Lark (gala work combining the forces of symphonic & band instruments in a large collaborative celebration)
- Jack & the Beanstalk (narrator, violin & cello)
- What You will Learn About the Brobinyak (children's chorus with adult mixed chorus)

=== Selected vocal works ===
- Songs of the King (soprano solo, mixed chorus, five obbligato instruments & strong orchestra)
- The Inquisitive Prince (one-act opera)
- The Angel Bride (soprano solo, mixed chorus & piano)
- In Excelsis Gloria (mixed chorus)

=== Selected recordings ===
- Opus 76 features Alan Morrison performing Organ Concerto in Verizon Hall with the Chamber Orchestra of Philadelphia
- American Voyage Alan Morrison performs Fantasy
- Musica Magica Maximilan Mangold and Mirjam Schröder perform Sonata for Harp & Guitar
- Fairy Tales, Folklore & Fables Auricolae performs Jack & the Beanstalk
