= José Luis Lopátegui =

Spanish musician (1940–2002)

- Born: José Luis Lopátegui Rodríguez; 21 February 1940; Valencia, Spain
- Died: 6 March 2002 (aged 62) Barcelona, Spain
- Genre: Classical
- Occupation: Musician
- Instrument: Classical guitar
- Years active: 1960–2002

José Luis Lopátegui Rodríguez (Valencia, 1940 – Barcelona, 6 March 2002) was a Spanish musician, classical guitarist and professor.

== Biography ==
Born in Valencia, his family moved to Barcelona during his infancy. Lopátegui attended the Municipal Conservatory of Barcelona where he later developed his pedagogic career. He began, but did not complete, his engineering studies.

He was a disciple of Emilio Pujol and attended classes from and became Narciso Yepes's friend. He adopted Yepes' ten-string guitar as a performer. As a concert player, his musicality was remarkable. He stood out in the classical period repertoire, being remarkable in the interpretation of Luigi Boccherini, Fernando Sor, Francisco Tárrega and Miguel Llobet's works. He kept an eye on contemporary classical music as well. He played worldwide, mostly in Europa, Asia and Amèrica.

== Discography ==
- "Antología histórica de la música catalana. La guitarra 1". José Luis Lopátegui. Obras de Fernando Sors, Francisco Tárrega, Miguel Llobet, Emilio Pujol. EDIGSA, 1969.
- "La guitarra en el Reinaxement i Barróc espanyol". Works from Luis de Milán, Alonso Mudarra, Diego Pisador, Gaspar Sanz and Luis de Narváez. EDIGSA, 1970.
- "La guitare catalane". Works from Milán, Mudarra, Pisador, Gaspar Sanz and Narváez. Harmonia Mundi, 1971.
- "La Guitare au Siècle D'Or Espagnol". Works from Milán, Mudarra, Pisador, Gaspar Sanz and Narváez. Harmonia Mundi, 1979.
- "Spanish Guitar Music of the 16th & 17th Centuries". Works from Milán, Mudarra, Pisador, Gaspar Sanz and Narváez. Turnabout, 1971.
- "Integral dels Opus 31 al 35" from Ferran Sors . EDIGSA, 1977.
- "The Guitar in Spanish Golden Age". Works from Milán, Mudarra, Pisador, Gaspar Sanz and Narváez. Harmonia Mundi, 1979.
- "José Luis Lopátegui. Miquel Llobet, Ferran Sors, Francesc Tàrrega and Emili Pujol". PDI, 1986.
- "Kosice Quartet – José Luis Lopátegui". D major quartet op.2 No.2 de Joseph Haydn and C major Quintet "La ritirata de Madrid" from Luigi Boccherini. Picap, 2009.
- "J. L. Lopátegui interpreta guitarra de diez cuerdas deu cordes". Cinco preludios from Heitor Villa-Lobos, Elogio de la danza and Tarantos from Leo Brouwer and Estudios Nº 1, Nº 3, Nº 7, Nº 10, Nº 12 from Villa-Lobos. Actual Records Distribució, 2009.

== Publications ==
- Introducción al estudio de la guitarra. Método preliminar progresivo. Guitarra. LOPÁTEGUI, José Luis. Editorial Boileau. ISBN 978-84-8020-548-1
- Introducción al estudio de la guitarra. Método preliminar progresivo. Estudio nº 39. Guitarra. LOPÁTEGUI, José Luis. Editorial Boileau. ISMN 979-0-3503-0358-6
- La técnica de la guitarra I. Escalas y arpegios. José Luis Lopategui. Editorial Alpuerto, 1975.
- Guitarra-didáctica. Doce estudios progresivos. Lopátegui, José Luis. 1975. Nº Registro BNE: XX4816405
