= Girolamo Dalla Casa =

Italian composer

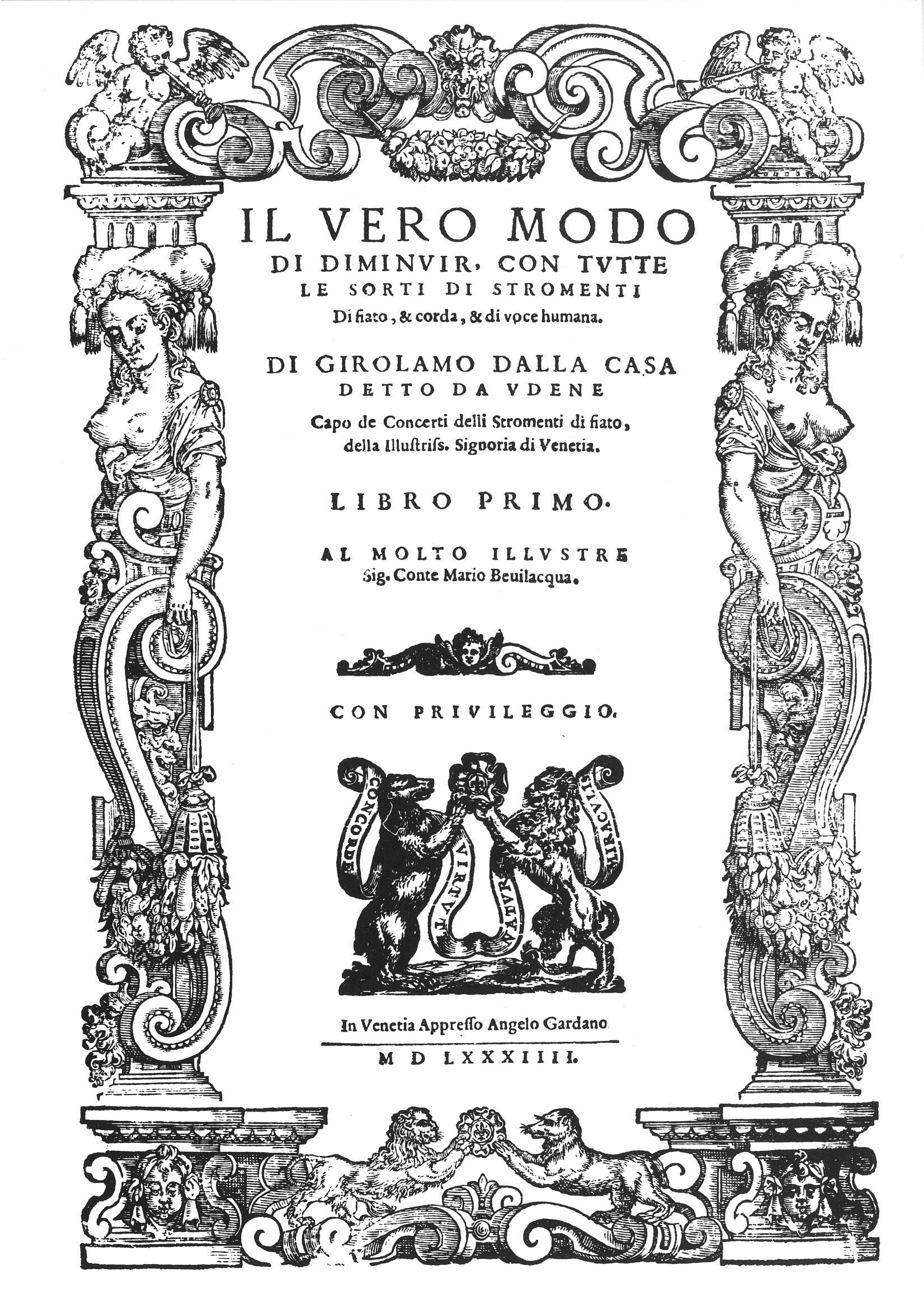
- Title-page of Il vero modo di diminuir con tutte le sorti di stromenti, 1584
- Born: assumed to be Udine, Republic of Venice
- Died: about August 1601; Venice, Republic of Venice
- Other names: Girolamo da Udine; Hieronymo de Udene
- Occupations: cornettist; capo de' concerti; composer; music theorist
- Years active: 1569–1601
- Notable work: Il vero modo di diminuir con tutte le sorti di stromenti, 1584

Girolamo Dalla Casa, also known as Girolamo da Udine and Hieronymo de Udene, was a Venetian composer, instrumentalist, and music theorist of the late Italian Renaissance. He was – with Giovanni Gabrieli and Giovanni Bassano – among the principal figures in music-making in St Mark's Basilica in the late sixteenth century, but is remembered mainly for his treatise on diminution, Il vero modo di diminuir con tutte le sorti di stromenti, published in two volumes in 1584.

== Biography ==
Nothing is known about his life prior to his arrival at Venice, but he was probably born at Udine sometime before the middle of the sixteenth century. He was first hired by the musical establishment of St Mark's Basilica on 29 January 1568, along with his two brothers, Giovanni and Nicolò, where they formed the first permanent instrumental ensemble.. The sonorous acoustical environment of this basilica was the center of activity of the Venetians. Giovanni Gabrieli clearly had Dalla Casa's group in mind for much of his music, and the Dalla Casas are presumed to have played in many the elaborate polychoral compositions of the time.

In 1572, Dalla Casa served as Venetian agent for the purchase of a large number of wind instruments and printed editions of music for the court of John of Austria, half-brother of Philip II of Spain and hero of the Battle of Lepanto in the previous year. The transaction, made though the Spanish resident ambassador in Venice, Diego Guzmán de Silva, came to the considerable sum of 154 scudi, 3 lire, and 20 soldi in gold. The instruments purchased included four tenor and two soprano shawms, six alto cornetts, five mute cornetts, two large [bass?] cornetts, two dulcians, and trumpets from Nuremberg and Augsburg. An unusually large sum was charged for a "'cassa di flauti grossi" (chest of large recorders), which may have included several SATB consorts. The music included five printed books by Cipriano de Rore, four books by Orlando di Lasso, four books by Vincenzo Ruffo, and a collection by Pedro Guerrero, as well as other books whose contents were not specified in the receipt, which is dated 20 February 1572 and signed in Dalla Casa's hand.

Dalla Casa was a virtuoso player of the cornett, which he described as 'the most excellent of all the wind instruments ... because it mimics the human voice better than the other instruments do'.

The use of the Dalla Casas by Gabrieli and St. Mark's foreshadowed, and may have influenced, the development of the concertino-ripieno style of the concerto grosso in the later Baroque. Being a smaller group of virtuoso instrumentalists playing in contrast to larger instrumental and vocal forces arrayed around them, and being in the center of a hugely influential stylistic movement, they functioned as an early form of concertino. Much of the music which Gabrieli and the other Venetians wrote for them survives.

Two books of madrigals and one book of motets survive from his compositional output, which probably was not large. More important to musicology, however, was his two-part 1584 treatise on ornamentation (Il vero modo di diminuir), which gives clear and precise examples of ornamentation as it was practiced in singing and playing French chansons and Italian madrigals at the time. In contrast to earlier ornamentation treatises, Dalla Casa introduced short ornamental patterns with jerky and discontinuous rhythms, such as the tremoli groppizati and groppi battute, to emphasize particular notes and heighten their emotional effect. Diminutions on intervalic skips of sixths, sevenths, and octaves also appear for the first time in this treatise, which is therefore regarded as marking the end of the purely Renaissance style of ornamentation and the beginnings of Baroque practice. From this treatise, it is clear that polyphonic works were usually performed unadorned, but works in a more homophonic style, and especially grand polychoral works with frequent sectional changes and prominent cadences, were embellished with ornaments, few of which appear in the actual notated music.

== Publications ==
His published work includes:

- Il primo libro de madrigali a 5 e a 6 voci insieme a un dialogo a otto. Venezia: Figlioli di Antonio Gardano, 1574
- Il vero modo di diminuir con tutte le sorti di stromenti di fiato, & corda, & di voce humana, 2 volumes. Venice: Angelo Gardano, 1584. (Note: Facsimile reprints: * Giuseppe Vecchi (preface) (1970). Il vero modo di diminuir con tutte le sorti di stromenti (Bibliotheca musica Bononsiensis, sezione II, no. 23). Bologna: Arnaldo Forni Editore, 1970; * Paolo Biordi, Vittorio Ghielmi (editors) Viole de gambe: Méthodes, traités, dictionnaires et encyclopédies, ouvrages généraux. 1: 139–249; * Méthodes & traités. IV: Italie 1600–1800, No. 17. Courlay, France: J. M. Fuzeau, 2004.; English translation: Jesse Rosenberg, Historic Brass Society Journal. 1 (1, 1989): 109–114).)
- Il secondo libro de madrigali a 5 voci, con i passaggi. Venezia: Ricciardo Amadino, 1590
- Il primo libro de mottetti a 6 voci. Venezia: Ricciardo Amadino, 1597.

Neither his madrigals nor his motets are known to survive complete. The only known copies of the alto and basso parts of the primo libro de madrigali are held in the British Library, while the unicum of the canto is in the Biblioteca Nazionale Marciana in Venice. The only known copies of the canto, alto, quinto and basso parts of the secondo libro are in the Musiksammlung of the Österreichische Nationalbibliothek in Vienna; the tenor part is missing. The alto, tenor, quinto and sesto parts of the primo libro de mottetti are in the collections of the Museo internazionale e biblioteca della musica in Bologna; there is no known copy of the canto or the other alto part.

The unica of the two volumes of Il vero modo di diminuir are conserved in the same museum in Bologna.
