= Jason Vieaux =

American classical guitarist (born 1973)

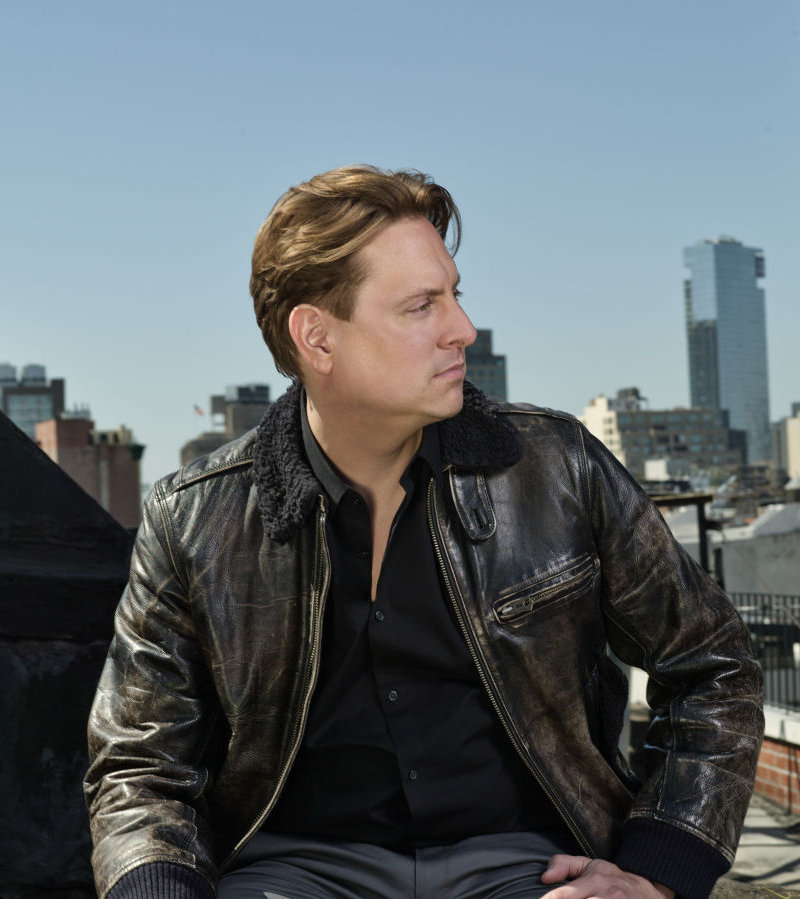

Background information
- Born: July 17, 1973 (age 53); Buffalo, New York, U.S.
- Genres: Classical
- Occupations: Musician, composer
- Instrument: Guitar
- Years active: 1993 - Present
- Labels: Naxos, Azica
- Website: www.jasonvieaux.com

Jason Vieaux (born July 17, 1973) is an American classical guitarist. He began his musical training in Buffalo, New York at the age of eight, after which he continued his studies at the Cleveland Institute of Music. In 1992, Vieaux was awarded the Guitar Foundation of America International Guitar Competition First Prize, the event's youngest winner.

NPR describes him as, "perhaps the most precise and soulful classical guitarist of his generation," and Gramophone magazine puts him "among the elite of today's classical guitarists." His album Play won the 2015 Grammy Award for Best Classical Instrumental Solo.

== Career highlights ==
Jason Vieaux has performed as a concerto soloist with over 100 orchestras, including Cleveland, Houston, Toronto, San Diego, Fort Worth, Charlotte, Buffalo, Richmond, Edmonton, Auckland, Chamber Orchestra of Philadelphia, Orchestra of St. Luke's, and Chautauqua Festival. Some of the conductors he has worked with include David Lockington, David Robertson, Edwin Outwater, Jahja Ling, Michael Stern, Miguel Harth-Bedoya, Stefan Sanderling, Gerard Schwarz, Giancarlo Guerrero, and Steven Smith.

Vieaux's appearances for Caramoor Summer Music Festival, Philadelphia Chamber Music Society, Chamber Music Society of Lincoln Center, New York's 92nd Street Y, Music@Menlo, Strings Music Festival, Grand Teton, Argentina's Teatro Colón, and many others have forged his reputation as a first-rate performer and curator of programs.

As a chamber musician Jason Vieaux regularly performs and collaborates with Escher String Quartet, violinist Anne Akiko Meyers, Grammy-winning mezzo-soprano Sasha Cooke, harpist Yolanda Kondonassis, and accordion/bandoneon virtuoso Julien Labro.

Vieaux's passion for new music has fostered premieres of works by Avner Dorman, Jeff Beal, Dan Visconti, Vivian Fung, David Ludwig, Jonathan Leshnoff, Jerod Tate, Gary Schocker, and Eric Sessler. In 2021, notable Jazz guitarist Pat Metheny dedicated Four Paths Of Light, a four-movement guitar solo work, to Jason Vieaux which Vieaux has recorded for the Pat Metheny album Road to the Sun.

=== Teaching ===
Jason Vieaux co-founded the guitar department at the Curtis Institute of Music in 2011 and has taught at the Cleveland Institute of Music since 1997, heading the guitar department since 2001.

In 2012, the Jason Vieaux School of Classical Guitar was launched with ArtistWorks, a technological interface that provides one-on-one online study with Vieaux for guitar students around the world.

=== Composing ===
Vieaux has arranged and composed pieces for the guitar throughout his career. Since 2020, he has self-published scores for his original compositions.

== Instrument ==
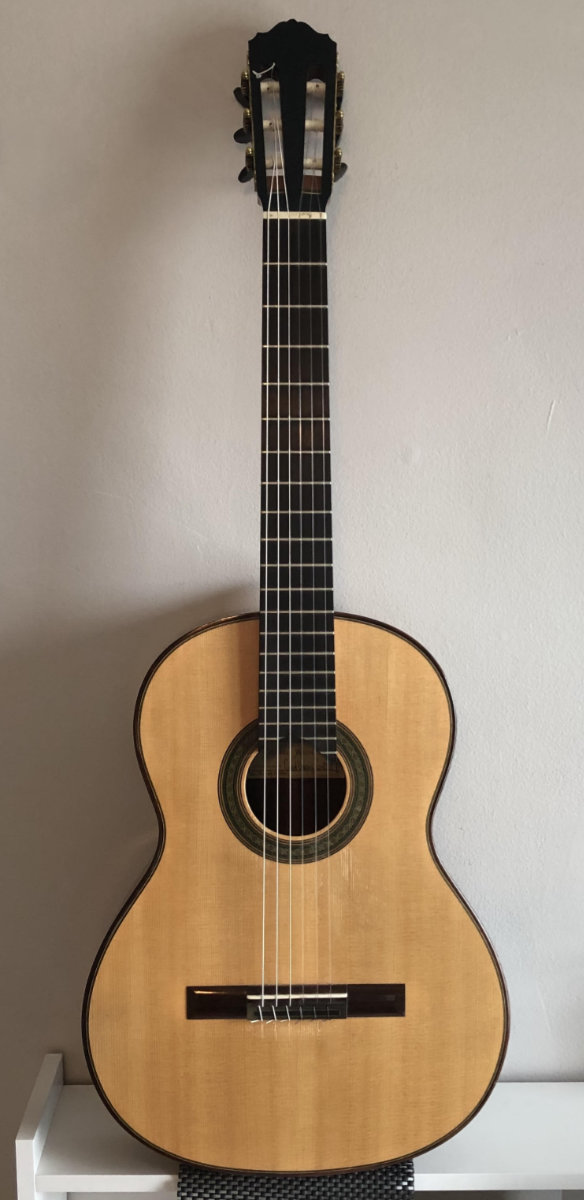
A photo of Jason Vieaux's Gernot Wagner guitar from 2021

Jason Vieaux currently performs on a Gernot Wagner guitar made in 2013. Wagner is based in Frankfurt, Germany.

The guitar is made in the "double-top" or "laminate-top" style of classical guitar construction.

== Notable achievements, awards, and honors ==
- 1992: At 19, he became the youngest First Prize winner of the Guitar Foundation of America International Guitar Competition, a record which still stands as of the 2020.
- 1995: Jason was named an Arts Ambassador of the U.S. to Southeast Asia.
- 1996: His debut album, released by Naxos Records in 1996, won the rosette in its rating in the Penguin Guide to Compact Discs.
- 1998: Jason received the Cleveland Institute of Music Alumni Achievement Award.
- 2002: Vieaux became a Young Artist-In-Residence for NPR's Performance Today.
- 2009: He became the first classical musician to perform on NPR's Tiny Desk Concert series.
- 2010: Jason received the Salon Di Virtuosi Career Grant Award.
- 2011: He co-founded the Curtis Institute of Music Guitar Department with David Starobin.
- 2014: NPR named "Zapateado" from his solo album Play as one of its "50 Favorite Songs of 2014 (So Far)."
- 2015: Vieaux's solo album Play won the 2015 Grammy Award for Best Classical Instrumental Solo.
- 2016: Jason received the Cleveland Institute of Music Distinguished Alumni Award.

== Discography ==
Solo:

- Jason Vieaux, Guitar, a selection of works composed by Morel, Brouwer, Regondi, Bach, Ponce (1993)
- Laureate Series Guitar Recital (Naxos, 1996)
- Sor – Guitar Music, a selection of works composed by Fernando Sor (Naxos, 1998)
- Ponce: Guitar Sonatas (Azica, 2002)
- Sevilla, a selection of works composed by Isaac Albéniz (Azica, 2003)
- Images of Metheny, a selection of works composed by Pat Metheny (Azica, 2005)
- Bach Vol. 1, Works for Lute, a selection of works composed by Johann Sebastian Bach (Azica, 2009)
- Play, a selection of Spanish, Mexican, South American, Cuban, French, and American solo classical guitar classics (Azica, 2014)

Chamber:

- Dream Travels, with flutist Gary Schocker (Azica, 2002)
- Arioso, with flutist Gary Schocker (Azica, 2004)
- Song of Brazil, with cellist Young-Hoon Song (Stomp/EMI, 2007)
- The Music of Astor Piazzolla, with bandoneonist Julien Labro and A Far Cry Chamber Orchestra (Azica, 2011)
- Alchemy, performed Jan Krzywicki's In Evening's Shadow with Susan Narucki, Hirono Oka, Rachel Ku, and Yumi Kendall (Albany, 2011)
- Together, with harpist Yolanda Kondonassis (Azica, 2015)
- Infusion, with accordionist and bandoneonist Julien Labro (Azica, 2016)
- Dance, with Escher Quartet (Azica, 2019)

Guest:

- Martha Aarons – History of the Tango: Performed L'Histoire du Tango by Ástor Piazzolla with Martha Aarons (Azica, 2003)
- Sammy DeLeon Y Su Orquesta - Con Salsa Y Sabor!: Performed Aúscencia (Azica, 2004)
- Various Artists - Ginastera: One Hundred: Performed Alberto Ginastera's solo Guitar Sonata (Oberlin Music, 2016)
- Various Artists - House of Cards Symphony: Performed Six Sixteen with Norrköping Symphony Orchestra, conducted by Jeff Beal (BIS Records, 2018)
- *Jonathan Leshnoff - Symphony No. 4, Guitar Concerto, Starburst: Performed Leshnoff's Guitar Concerto with the Nashville Symphony and Giancarlo Guerrero (Naxos, 2019)
- *Stephen Powell - American Composers at Play: Performed The Brief Light by John Musto with Stephen Powell (Acis, 2020) *
- Pat Metheny - Road to the Sun: Performed Four Paths of Light, a four-movement guitar solo work dedicated to Vieaux by Metheny (Modern Recordings, 2021)

Albums with a * are Grammy-nominated.
