= Esteban Daza =

Spanish composer

Esteban Daza (or Estevan Daça) (c. 1537 in Valladolid – between 1591 and 1596 in Valladolid) was a Spanish composer and vihuelist of the Renaissance. He was one of the last major vihuelists of the 16th century, as the instrument's popularity was eclipsed by that of the guitar.

Daza came from a middle class family, and was the eldest of fourteen children. He studied at the University of Valladolid, where he graduated probably in the early 1560s. There is no evidence that he ever practised a profession, he was able to survive on income from his family's investments. As revealed by the research of John Griffiths (musician), he lived in his parents' home until at least the time of his father's death 1569, although probably until long after the publication of his vihuela music. The last documents that mention in the early 1590s indicate that he was living outside the city wall of Valladolid in a house owned by his brother Baltasar.

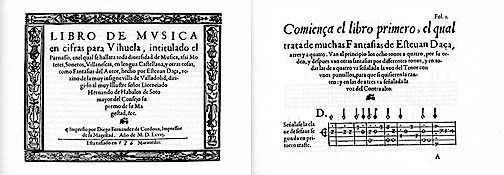
Cover and first page of El Parnaso.

El Parnaso (Parnassus) is the only known book of music published by Daza. It was printed in 1576 in Valladolid, and contains works for solo vihuela and for vihuela and voice. The full title of the work is Libro de música de cifras para vihuela, intitulado El Parnaso. It is divided into three parts and consists of fantasias and transcriptions for vihuela of polyphonic songs, motets, villancicos, villanescas and sonnets of other composers, such as Pedro Guerrero, Francisco Guerrero, Juan García de Basurto, Jean Maillard, Jean Richafort, Thomas Crecquillon, Simon Boyleau, Rodrigo de Ceballos, Juan de Navarro, Pedro Ordoñez and Clemens non Papa. Daza's fantasias have been edited in modern notation by John Griffiths.
