= Behzad Mirkhani =

Iranian guitarist and composer

Behzad Mirkhani (born 13 May 1969) is a Persian guitarist and composer, best known for his works based on folk music idioms. He is a member of the Iran House of Music, Irish Music Rights Organization (IMRO), and the Registry of Guitar Tutors (RGT).

== Career ==
Born in Tehran, in 1990, he began to compose a series of works including guitar concertos, string quartets, orchestral music and pieces for solo guitar and guitar with mixed ensembles, which have received numerous performances.

In the music center of Iran Ministry of culture, Behzad Mirkhani's debut album, The Last Leaf (1990), has been established as the first Iranian composition for the classical guitar. His other albums have been released since then through Iranian record labels and internationally through CD Baby, headquartered in Oregon.
