= Tilman Hoppstock =

German musician

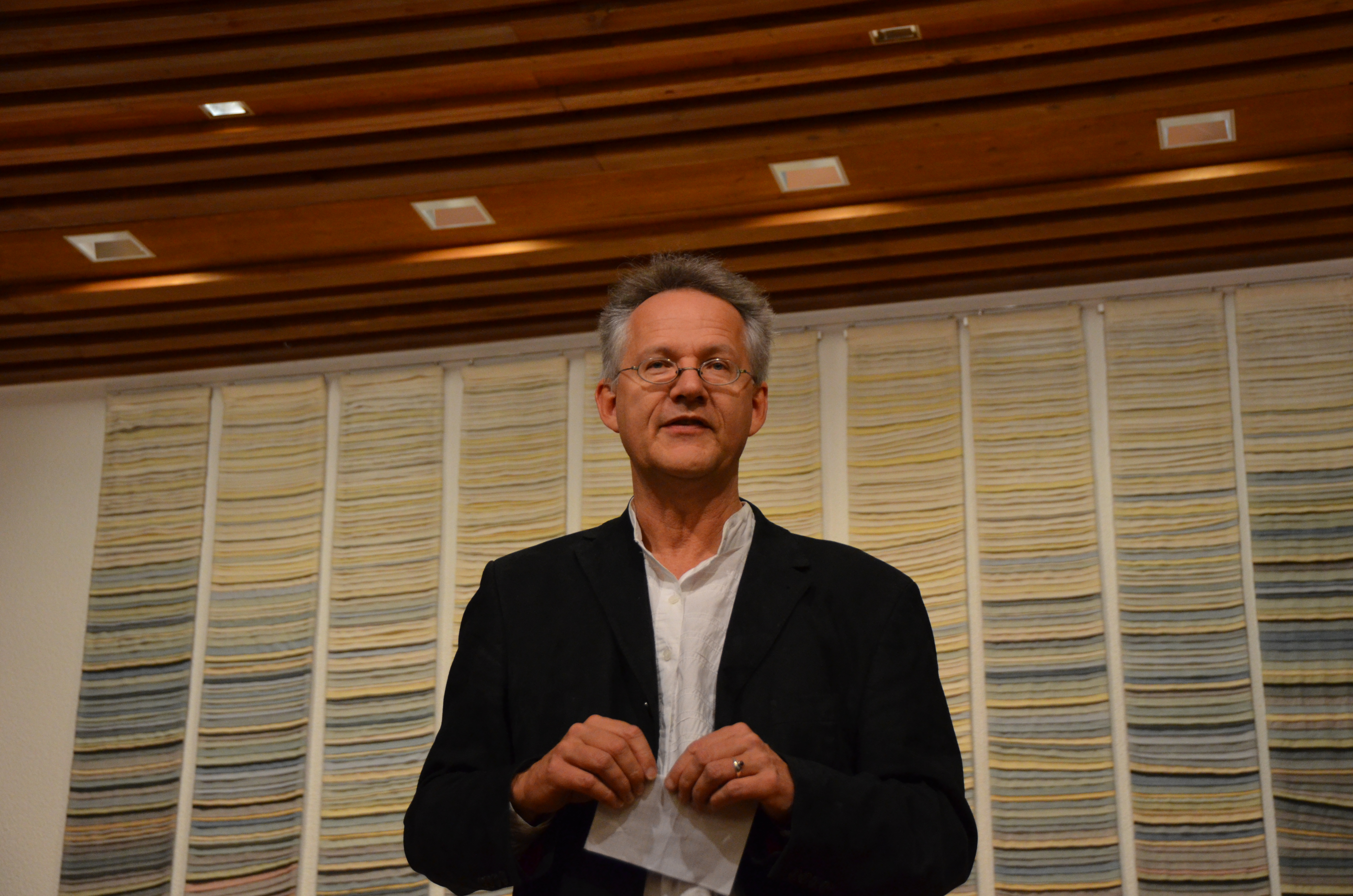
Tilman Hoppstock (2016)

Tilman Hoppstock (born 1961) is a classical guitarist, cellist and musicologist from Germany.

== Biography ==
He studied both guitar and cello in Darmstadt and Cologne. His concert career began in 1978 and brought him to about 40 countries all over the world. Invitations to international music festivals in Europe and overseas, as well as to the Royal Academy of Music (London), the Manhattan School of Music (New York) and the University of Southern California (Los Angeles), have been further highlights of his multifaceted career. 2003 - 2005 he was invited to teach as a guest professor at the Music University in Piteå (Sweden). He has made several radio, television and commercial recordings, both solo and with other musicians including the pianist Alexis Weissenberg, tenor Christoph Prégardien, cellist Peter Wolf and the Rubio String Quartet. He also publishes music, including songs by Schubert, modern works written specially for him (Karl-Wieland Kurz's I giardini del sogno, for example), his own compositions and arrangements of music from the Baroque period. Besides his career as a recitalist, Hoppstock teaches international guitar classes at the Akademie für Tonkunst Darmstadt (Academy of Music at Darmstadt, Germany). In 2013 Tilman Hoppstock has received the ”Darmstadt Music Award 2013” for his lifework as guitarist, teacher, musicologist and publisher. In 2014 he obtained his doctorate with his dissertation about 'The Polyphony in Bach's Lute Fugues'. In 2026, Tilman Hoppstock became the first German guitarist to be inducted into the Hall of Fame of the world’s largest guitar organisation, the Guitar Foundation of America (GFA).

== Reviews ==
- Hoppstock is an exceptional player, with a fine sense of style and unfailing sensitivity, and a technician of the first water; his tone is refined and beautifully nuanced, his delivery is clean and sure even in the passages where the utmost dexterity is called for, and his command of varied articulation is admirable Gramophone (2/1998)
- A playful interchange of light and dark shades with endless worlds of sound full of passion and conscientiousness...Tilman Hoppstock belongs to those artists who make you forget the instrument. Alexis Weissenberg (Paris, 1992)
- Tilman Hoppstock‘s perfect performance, his extreme sensibility and a broad range of timbres and nuances, but also this extraordinary articulation in his playing makes him to one of the greatest guitarists in our century. Les Cahiers de la Guitare (Paris, No. 66/1998)
- The work is quite an extraordinary achievement and emphasizes how Hoppstock’s evolution through the years of interpreting Bach is of itself a fascinating aspect of his musicianship which deserves close attention. The quality of these recordings is first-class throughout and superbly well re-mastered, so there is none of the jarring technological dislocation that often afflicts compilations of tracks from various years. This is a recording which should be on every self-respecting guitarist’s shelf, no doubt cheek-by-jowl with Hoppstock’s published books on Bach. Classical Guitar Magazine, 12/2014

== Editions (selection) ==
- Bach: The lutework and related compositions in urtext for guitar (Prim-Musikverlag)
- Bach: Cellosuite No. 1 BWV 1007 (2 versions)(Prim-Musikverlag)
- Bach: Cellosuite No. 1 BWV 1008 (2 versions)(Prim-Musikverlag)
- J. J. Froberger : Lamento & Suite No. 2 (Prim-Musikverlag)
- Schubert: 110 Songs for tenor & guitar(Prim-Musikverlag)
- Schubert: 61 Songs for baritone & guitar (Prim-Musikverlag)
- Ponce: Works for Guitar, Urtext (www.schott.music.com)
- Werthmüller: Variations & Rondo (Chanterelle)
- Hoppstock/Willcocks: 12 Studies for Guitar (Prim-Musikverlag)
- Hoppstock/Willcocks: 12 Miniature Preludes for Guitar (Prim-Musikverlag)
- Hoppstock/Willcocks: 12 Sketches for Guitar (Prim-Musikverlag)
- Hoppstock/Willcocks: Suite Transcendent for 4 Guitars (Prim-Musikverlag)
- Ponce: 24 Preludes for solo guitar URTEXT (Prim-Musikverlag)
- John Dowland: The complete Lute Works in transcription for guitar (Van Gonnissen/Hoppstock) ()

== Books ==
- Polyphony in Bach's Fugues for Lute (Prim-Musikverlag, english, german)
- Bach's Lute Works from the Guitarist's Perspective, Vol. 1 (BWV 995/996) (Prim-Musikverlag)
- Bach's Lute Works from the Guitarist's Perspective, Vol. 2 (BWV 998/999/1000) (Prim-Musikverlag)

== Discography (selection) ==
- Fernando Sor: Works for Guitar (Signum, 1985)
- Tilman Hoppstock: Early Recordings 1980-1984 Vol. I (PRIM, 1996)
- Tilman Hoppstock: Early Recordings 1980-1984 Vol. II (PRIM, 1996)
- J. S. BACH: Transcriptions for Guitar (u.a. BWV 995 & 996) (CHE, 1985)
- Works for Guitar: Villa-Lobos, Ponce, Brouwer, Paganini (SIGNUM, 1989)
- El Ultimo Tremolo – Paganini, Barrios, Brouwer a. o. Early Tapes 1980–1985 (CHE, 1989)
- Clavier Works in Transcription for Guitar (SIGNUM/PRIM, 1989)
- Baroque Cello & Guitar (together with Rainer Zipperling) (SIGNUM/PRIM 55–00, 1991)
- See, we assemble - Tilman Hoppstock and Friends (SIGNUM/PRIM, 1992)
- Classical Guitar - Werthmüller, Marschner, Sor - (SIGNUM/CHE 1995)
- 20th century music for guitar (SIGNUM, 1996)
- Songs from Love & Death - together with Christoph Prégardien, Tenor (CHR, 1998)
- Ponce: Sonatas & Variations (SIGNUM, 1999)
- Memories of the Alhambra (SIGNUM, 1999)
- I maestri della chitarra: Tilman Hoppstock (Seicorde E59, 2001)
- Projects (chamber music live & in studio) (PRIM 1996/2000)
- I Giardini del Sogno - T. H. live at “Tage für Neue Musik 2003 Darmstadt” (SIGNUM, 2003)
- Bella Italia (GuitArt, 2005)
- Images of Spain (PRIM, 2009)
- Great Studies for Guitar (CHE, 2010)
- Tilman Hoppstock & Friends, Live 2004-2011 – 2CD-Box (PRIM, 2011)
- Schubert: Winterreise (together with Christoph Prégardien, tenor) (CHR, 2011)
- Baroque Suites for Guitar (L. Couperin, Froberger, Buxtehude, Bach) (CHR, 2012)
- Brouwer talks – Hoppstock plays, Live Darmst. Gitarrentage 2000 (PRIM, 2012)
- Great Preludes for Guitar (Willcocks, Tarrega, Ponce, Villa-Lobos) (CHE, 2012)
- ALHAMBRA (Sor, Torroba, Albéniz, de Falla, Paco de Lucia u.a. ) (CHE, 2014)
- BACH: Works for Guitar - 2CD-Box all Bach recordings from T. Hoppstock 1979–2001 (CHR, 2014)
- BACH: Cello Suites No. 1, 2, 5 + da Milano/Bach: Fantasies and Chorals (CHR, 2018)
- Hoppstock (alias Allan Willcocks): Works for Guitar (Hoppstock solo and L.A.Guitar Quartet) (CHR, 2019)
- Hoppstock: Variations for Guitar (Hoppstock solo + chamber music) (CHR, 2022)

== Interviews ==
- Tilman Hoppstock - 2006 Interview with lacg (Los Angeles Classical Guitar) about Villa-Lobos study n.7, Bach's Gavotta en Rondeau BWV 1006a and Sarabande BWV 825, etc.
- (3) Classical Guitar Magazin - September 2011
