= José Brocá =

Spanish composer and guitarist

José Brocá y Codina (in Catalan: Antoni Josep Mateu Brocà i Codina) (21 September 1805 – 3 February 1882) was a Spanish guitarist and composer of the Romantic period.

== Life and music ==
Brocá was born in Reus, province of Tarragona. Mainly self-taught on the guitar, he also studied briefly with Dionisio Aguado. He was reputed to have been an excellent performer on his instrument. As a teacher based in Barcelona, his best-known pupils included Felipe Pedrell and José Ferrer who both dedicated compositions to him (and vice versa). He was a friend to Julián Arcas.

In his teaching, Brocá used Aguado's method. Brocá died in Barcelona.

Brocá composed around twenty works for the guitar; Bone (1914/54) singles out his opus 19 (Fantasia and Tone Poem) as his "principal guitar composition". Brocá's music was praised for its elegance and its stylistic proximity to Tárrega's, despite being several decades older.

== Compositions for guitar ==
Dates after online catalogue of Biblioteca Nacional de España.

- El destino. Fantasía para guitarra (1864)
- El cortesano. Schotisch (1864)
- Andante sentimental (1870)
- Andante (1885)
- El catalán. Vals (1885)
- Fantasía (1886)
- Recuerdo triste. Melodía (1886)
- Crepúsculos. Tres valses (1886)
- El último canto. Fantasía con variaciones (1886)
- Recuerdos juveniles. Tres valses (1886)
- Tres piezas fáciles (1886)
- Albores. Tres valses (1886)
- El veloz. Vals (1886)
- El elegante. Vals (1886)
- El patinador. Schotisch (1886)
- La amistad. Fantasía con variaciones (1886)
- Fantasía (1886)
- Una flor. Mazurka (1886)
- Pensamiento español (1886)
- El ay. Vals (1886)
- Un adiós (1886)
- Alegreto (1886)
