= José Ferrer (guitarist) =

Spanish guitarist & composer (1835–1916)

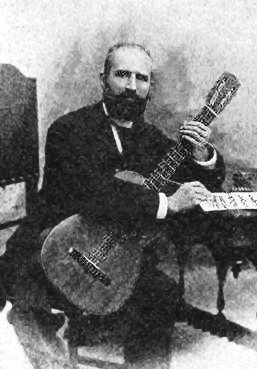
José Ferrer (guitarist).

José Ferrer Esteve de Fujadas (in 19th-century France known as "Joseph Ferrer") (13 March 1835 – 7 March 1916) was a Spanish guitarist and composer.

== Life ==
Ferrer was born in Torroella de Montgrí, Girona, and studied guitar with his father, a guitarist and collector of sheet music, before continuing his studies with José Brocá. In 1882, he left Spain for Paris in order to teach at the Institut Rudy and at the Académie Internationale de Musique, also becoming the official guitarist of the Comédie Française, and remained in Paris for 16 years.

Ferrer gave regular performances as a soloist. He taught at the Conservatori Superior de Música del Liceu in Barcelona from 1898 to 1901. Following a period of moving between Barcelona and Paris, he settled permanently in Barcelona in 1905, where he died.

== Music ==
Most of Ferrer's compositions were written for guitar but, being a deeply religious man, he also wrote some sacred music. His works for guitar solo and duo resemble the fashionable salon music of his time, bearing titles such as Le Charme de la nuit ("Charm of the Night") and La Danse des Naïades ("Dance of the Naiads"). One of his most popular pieces was his opus 1, Recuerdos de Montgri. He dedicated a number of pieces to his pupils, especially to the females. About half the number of his c.100 compositions were published during his lifetime, mainly by Vidal of Barcelona, Dupont and Pisa of Paris and latterly by Union Musical Española of Madrid.

He also wrote an unpublished method for guitar as well as duos for guitar and flute, and songs. His method "shows his great knowledge and understanding of the guitar's history and technique".

== Compositions ==
Sorted, within the sections, after opus number. Dates are for first publication, not necessarily for composition, taken from the online catalogues of the Biblioteca Nacional de España and the Bibliothèque nationale de France.

Guitar

- Recuerdos de Montgri. Capricho, Op. 1 (1873) (dedicated to José Brocá)
- Quejas de mi lira. Vals, Op. 2 (1892)
- Fantasía con variaciones sobre un tema de Beriot, Op. 3 (1877)
- Cuatro piezas progresivas, Op. 4 (1885). Contains: 1. Vals; 2. Minué; 3. Andante; 4. Allegretto.
- El ramillete. Diez pequeñas piezas, Op. 5 (1885)
- Brisas del Parnaso. Cuatro piezas, Op. 6 (1885)
- El talismán. Vals, Op. 7 (1885)
- Horas apacibles. Ocho piezas fáciles, Op. 8 (1885)
- Tres valses, Op. 9 (1885)
- Polonesa, Op. 10 (1885)
- Dos nocturnos, Op. 11 (1888)
- Doce minués, Op. 12 (1888) (dedicated to Francisco Tárrega)
- Elegía fantástica, Op. 13 (1888) (dedicated to the memory of José Brocá)
- De noche en el lago. Fantasía con variaciones, Op. 14 (1888)
- La gallegada Fantasía pastoril con variaciones, Op. 15 (1892)
- Los encantos de París. Capricho fantástico, Op. 16 (1892)
- Veladas íntimas. Cuatro piezas para guitarra, Op. 17 (1904)
- Impresiones juveniles. Vals brillante, Op. 18 (1904)
- Dos tangos, Op. 19 (1904)
- Canto de amor. Vals de concierto, Op. 20 (1904)
- Veillées d'automne. Quatre pièces faciles, Op. 21 (1893)
- Echos de la forêt. Mélodie-valse, Op. 22 (1893)
- Belle. Gavotte, Op. 24 (1893)
- Souvenir du 15 Aout Romance sans paroles, Op. 25 (1892)
- L'Étudiant de Salamanque. Pièces caractéristiques espagnoles, Op. 31 (1898)
- Agréments du foyer. Trois pièces faciles, Op. 32 (1898)
- Les Soupirs. Valse de concert, Op. 33 (1898)
- La Danse des Naïades, Op. 35 (1898)
- Charme de la nuit. Nocturne, Op. 36 (1898)
- Brise d'Espagne. Valse caractéristique, Op. 37 (1898)
- Pensées mélodiques. Quatre pièces, Op. 38 (1898). Contains: 1. Menuet; 2. Barcarolle; 3. Mélodie expressive; 4. Sicilienne.
- Souvenirs d'antan. Six menuets, Op. 40 (1898)
- Gerbe de fleurs. 4 pièces faciles, Op. 41 (1903). Contains: 1. Cantilène espagnole; 2. Pavane; 3. Mazurka; 4. Berceuse.
- Trois Mélodies, Op. 42 (1903). Contains: 1. Plainte amoureuse; 2. Méditation; 3. Doux message.
- Rêve du poète. Mélodie, Op. 43 (1903)
- Pensées du soir, Op. 44 (1903)
- Soliloquio. Nocturno, Op. 46 (1906)
- Urania. Nocturno, Op. 47 (1906)
- Canto del bardo. Capricho, Op. 48 (1906)
- Minué, Op. 49 (1906)
- Cuatro piezas fáciles, Op. 50 (1912)
- El gondolero. Melodía, Op. 51 (1912)
- La mascarita. Mazurka, Op. 52 (1912)
- Barcarola, Op. 54 (1912)
- El mensagero, Op. 55 (1913)
- Minué, Op. 56 (1913)
- Inquietud, Op. 57 (1914)
- Misiva afectuosa, Op. 58 (1914)
- Balada, Op. 59 (c.1914)
- Adagio, Op. 60
- La Ausencia, Op. 61
- Marcha nupcial, Op. 62
- Seranata espagnol, Op. 63

Piano

- Ismalia. Galop (1864)
- La Exposicion. Vals
- La Inquieta. Polka (1864)
- Las dos Hermanas. Polka-mazurca (1867)
- Loreto. Americana (1867)
- Misterio. Capricho-Schotisch (1876)
- La Craintive. Polka-mazurka, Op. 21 (1878)
- Le Premier salut aux beaux-arts. Mélodie variée (1878)
- La tranquila. Redowa (1885)

Duos

- Fantasía sobre motivos de "Lucrezia Borgia" (Donizetti) (1878)
- Minué (n.d.) and Vals for two guitars (1879)
- Fantasía sobre motivos de "La Favorite" (Donizetti) (1881)
- Fantasía sobre motivos de "La Traviata" (Verdi) (1884)
- Mélancolie. Nocturne, Op. 23, for two guitars or flute and guitar (1898)
- Les Sirènes. Valse, Op. 26, for banjo and guitar or two guitars (1892)
- Sérénade espagnole, Op. 34, for two guitars (1898)
- Boléro, Op. 39, for piano and guitar (1895)
- Terpsichore. Valse, Op. 45 for two guitars (1903)

Songs

- El jaque. Canción española (words by M. Alcayde) (1904)

== Selected recordings ==
- Complete Guitar Duets, performed by Jørgen Skogmo and Jens Franke (Naxos 8.574011, CD 2019).

== Bibliography ==
- Domingo Prat: Diccionario de Guitarristas (Buenos Aires, 1934)
- Simon Wynberg (ed.): Charme de la nuit. Selected Character Pieces for Guitar (London: Faber Music, 2003)
