= Nicholas Goluses =

American classical guitarist and music educator

- Education: Manhattan School of Music (DMA)
- Occupations: Guitarist; music professor
- Employer: Eastman School of Music
- Style: Classical; chamber
- Musical career
- Labels: Naxos; Albany; BMG; Nueva Venecia; Linn
- Website: goluses.com

Nicholas Goluses is an American classical guitarist and professor of classical guitar at the Eastman School of Music of the University of Rochester. He formerly held the Andrés Segovia Chair at the Manhattan School of Music, as the founder and chair of that school's guitar department, and has recorded seven albums for Naxos, including Bach: Sonatas Transcribed for Guitar and Sor: Fantaisies / Progressive Studies. He is one of the only guitarists to have transcribed and recorded all three of Bach's violin sonatas. James Jolly, in the 2010 Gramophone Classical Music Guide, wrote that Goluses's Guitar Collection: Sor set "a benchmark for present-day guitarists."

== Career ==
Goluses's concert tours as soloist, with orchestra, and as chamber musician have taken him across North and South America, Europe, Australia, and Asia to critical acclaim. His many New York recitals have taken place in Merkin Hall, Weill Hall at Carnegie Hall, Alice Tully Hall, and Kaufmann Auditorium at the 92nd Street Y. Goluses has been a featured performer at major festivals throughout the world and has performed as concerto soloist with the Los Angeles Philharmonic, New Jersey Symphony, Colorado Symphony, Rochester Philharmonic Orchestra, American Wind Orchestra, Manhattan Symphony, Louisiana Sinfonietta, Jacksonville Symphony, Heidelberg Symphony, Savannah Symphony, Guanajuato Symphony, Rochester Chamber Orchestra, Eastman Virtuosi, Eastman Philharmonia, and the Macon Symphony, among others. He enjoys an active duo with flautist Bonita Boyd and has collaborated with the American and Ying String Quartets, violinists Zvi Zeitlin and Juliana Athayde, and tenor Robert Swensen. His 2017–18 season was highlighted by a concert tour of China, comprising 23 cities throughout the country, as well as concerts in Belgium, Ireland, and throughout the U.S.

Goluses is Professor of Guitar at the Eastman School of Music, where he is currently Co-chair of the Strings, Harp, and Guitar Department and recipient of the Eisenhart Award for Excellence in Teaching. Before coming to Eastman, he was the first Andrés Segovia Professor at the Manhattan School of Music, where he received the Doctor of Musical Arts degree, and was the recipient of the Pablo Casals Award and the Faculty Award of Distinguished Merit. His students have won major awards and competitions throughout the world, including Darwin (Australia), Allentown, GFA, D'Addario, MTNA, Appalachian, Taxco (Mexico), Rantucci, Rosario, Stotsenburg, Paracho (Mexico), Brock (Canada) World Competition, Philadelphia Guitar Society, Lone Star Competition, Louisville Competition, Memphis Competition, Harvard Foote Prize, Hamilton, Belgium, Fulbright, CAPES (Brazil), and a Grammy Award. In addition, his students hold numerous professorships throughout the U.S., Australia, Mexico, Canada, Brazil, England, Taiwan, and Germany. Goluses is in demand for masterclasses at leading institutions throughout the world.

Goluses has recorded for Naxos, Albany, BMG, Nueva Venecia, and Linn Records. His solo recordings for Naxos have received wide critical and audience acclaim. He has recorded two duo CDs with Bonita Boyd for Albany Records (Chronicles of Discovery and Quicksilver, with soprano Kathryn Lewek), and Night Strings with violist George Taylor. His latest solo CD, From Afar, includes works by Britten, Schwantner, Ponce, and de Falla. His 2018 CD for Linn Records of the music of Samuel Adler features Adler's "Concerto for Guitar and Orchestra", "Ports of Call" with violinists Juliana Athade and Renée Jolles, "Into the Radiant Boundaries of Light" with violist Phillip Ying, and "Five Choral Scherzi" with the Eastman Chorus and violist Randolph Kelley.

Committed to performing new music for the guitar, Goluses has given world premiere performances of over 100 works, including solo pieces and concertos for guitar and orchestra, as well as chamber music by many of today's leading composers. His performance editions are published by Alfred Masterworks.

He is a member of the National Academy of Recording Arts and Sciences, has served on the Board of Directors for the Guitar Foundation of America, and has been named Musician of the Year by Mu Phi Epsilon. Goluses is the recipient of the centennial Distinguished Alumni Award from the Manhattan School of Music (2019).

Goluses was a recipient of the Fulbright Specialist Award in 2020–2023.
