= Pedro Guerrero (composer) =

Spanish composer

Pedro Guerrero (born c. 1520) was a Spanish composer of the Renaissance.

Guerrero was born in Seville, probably around 1520, and he may have sung in the Seville Cathedral choir. He was singer of the powerful dukes of Medina Sidonia from 1533 to 1536. He was the older brother of Francisco Guerrero and taught him music prior to Francisco's time studying with Cristóbal de Morales. By 1560 he had taken a position as a singer in Santa Maria Maggiore in Rome.

Guerrero's surviving compositions are scant. Several sacred motets are extant, as well as about ten secular songs in Spanish, though these only survive in intabulated versions for vihuela.
