= Paulo Bellinati =

Brazilian classical guitarist (born 1950)

- Born: 1950 (age 75–76)
- Education: Conservatório Dramático e Musical de São Paulo
- Occupation: classical guitarist

Paulo Bellinati (b. São Paulo, 1950) is a classical guitarist from Brazil. He studied classical guitar with Isais Savio and graduated from the Conservatório Dramático e Musical de São Paulo. Bellinati is particularly well known for three of his compositions, 'Jongo', 'Um Amor De Valsa', and 'Baião de Gude'.

== Career ==
Bellinati's career has taken him to Europe, Asia, and the Americas. Besides performing solo concerts and giving masterclasses at many international guitar festivals, he tours with Pau Brasil jazz group, American bassist Steve Swallow, Brazilian singer Mónica Salmaso, Brazilian guitarist Cristina Azuma, Brazilian flutist Antonio Carrasqueira and many European musicians. In 1994, he won the Prémio Sharp, Brazil's equivalent of a Grammy, for arranging the selections on Gal Costa's CD O Sorriso do Gato de Alice.

In addition to being a performer and arranger, Bellinati is also a music scholar. He rediscovered, transcribed, and recorded the music of the Brazilian guitarist-composer Anibal Augusto Sardinha (Garoto). His recording, The Guitar Works of Garoto, and two-volume edition of Garoto's works have received international critical acclaim and recognition for their significance.
