= Yolanda Kondonassis =

American harpist

- Born: 1963 (age 62–63); Norman, Oklahoma, U.S.
- Genre: Classical
- Occupation: Musician
- Instrument: Harp
- Years active: 1987–present
- Labels: Telarc, Azica, Oberlin, New World, Channel Classics
- Website: www.yolandaharp.com

Yolanda Kondonassis (born 1963 in Norman, Oklahoma, United States) is an American classical harpist. She is considered one of the world's premier solo harpists and is widely regarded as today's most recorded classical harpist.

Kondonassis attended high school at Interlochen Arts Academy. She continued her education at The Cleveland Institute of Music, where she received her bachelor's and master's degrees as a student of Alice Chalifoux. Her honors include top prizes in the New York Philharmonic National Young Artists Competition, 2 Solo Recitalists Grants from the National Endowment for the Arts, Grammy nomination, Cleveland Arts Prize, American Harp Society Young Concert Artists Competition, Interlochen Arts Academy Young Artist Medal, and The Cleveland Institute of Music Distinguished Alumni Award.

Kondonassis' discography, released on the Telarc, Azica, Oberlin, New World, and Channel Classics labels, includes over twenty titles. Her 2008 album of music by Takemitsu and Debussy, Air (Telarc), was nominated for a Grammy Award. Since making her debut at age 18 with the New York Philharmonic and Zubin Mehta, Kondonassis has appeared as soloist with orchestras such as The Cleveland Orchestra, English Chamber Orchestra, Hong Kong Philharmonic, Detroit Symphony, Dallas Symphony, San Diego Symphony, Philadelphia Chamber Orchestra, Houston Symphony, Orquesta Sinfonica de Puerto Rico, Phoenix Symphony, Buffalo Philharmonic, Odesa Philharmonic (Ukraine), New World Symphony, and Florida Orchestra. She has also performed at Carnegie Hall, Avery Fisher Hall, the 92nd Street Y, and Taiwan's National Concert Hall.

Her books include On Playing the Harp, a Comprehensive Guide to Harp Technique and Methodology, The Yolanda Kondonassis Collection, and The Yolanda Kondonassis Christmas Collection and were published by Carl Fischer Music. Her first children's book, Our House is Round: A Kid's Book About Why Protecting Our Earth Matters, was published in 2012 by Skyhorse Publishing and praised as "the perfect children's introduction to environmental issues" by The Environmental Defense Fund. Royalties from several of her projects are donated to Earth causes. She is the founder and director of Earth at Heart, a non-profit organization devoted to earth literacy and inspiration through the arts.

Kondonassis heads the harp departments at the Oberlin Conservatory of Music and The Cleveland Institute of Music, and has presented master classes around the world. She is married to Michael Sachs, principal trumpeter of the Cleveland Orchestra.

== Discography ==
- 1993 – Scintillation (Telarc)
- 1994 – A New Baroque (Telarc)
- 1996 – Sky Music (Telarc)
- 1997 – Dream Season: The Christmas Harp (Telarc)
- 1998 – Mozart: Flute Concertos and Concerto for Flute and Harp with Renée Krimsier (Channel Classics)
- 1998 – Pictures of the Floating World (Telarc)
- 1999 – Vivaldi: The Four Seasons (for Harp and Orchestra) (Telarc)
- 2000 – Music of Hovhaness (Telarc)
- 2001 – Quietude (Telarc)
- 2002 – Music for a Perfect Day (Telarc)
- 2003 – The Romantic Harp (Telarc)
- 2003 – Debussy's Harp (Telarc)
- 2006 – Breathe: The Relaxing Harp (Telarc)
- 2007 – Salzedo's Harp (Telarc)
- 2008 – Air (Telarc)
- 2009 – Never Far Away: Music of Bright Sheng (Telarc)
- 2012 – Solo Harp: The Best of Yolanda Kondonassis (Azica)
- 2013 – Ravel: Intimate Masterpieces (Oberlin)
- 2013 – American Harp (Azica)
- 2015 – Together (Azica)
- 2016 – Ginastera: One Hundred (Oberlin)
- 2019 – American Rapture (Azica)
- 2022 – Five Minutes for Earth (Azica)
