= Luis de Milán =

Spanish musician

Luis de Milán (also known as Lluís del Milà or Luys Milán) (c. 1500 – c. 1561) was a Spanish Renaissance composer, vihuelist, and writer on music. He was the first composer in history to publish music for the vihuela de mano, an instrument employed primarily in the Iberian peninsula and some of the Italian states during the 15th and 16th centuries, and he was also one of the first musicians to specify verbal tempo indications in his music.

== Life ==
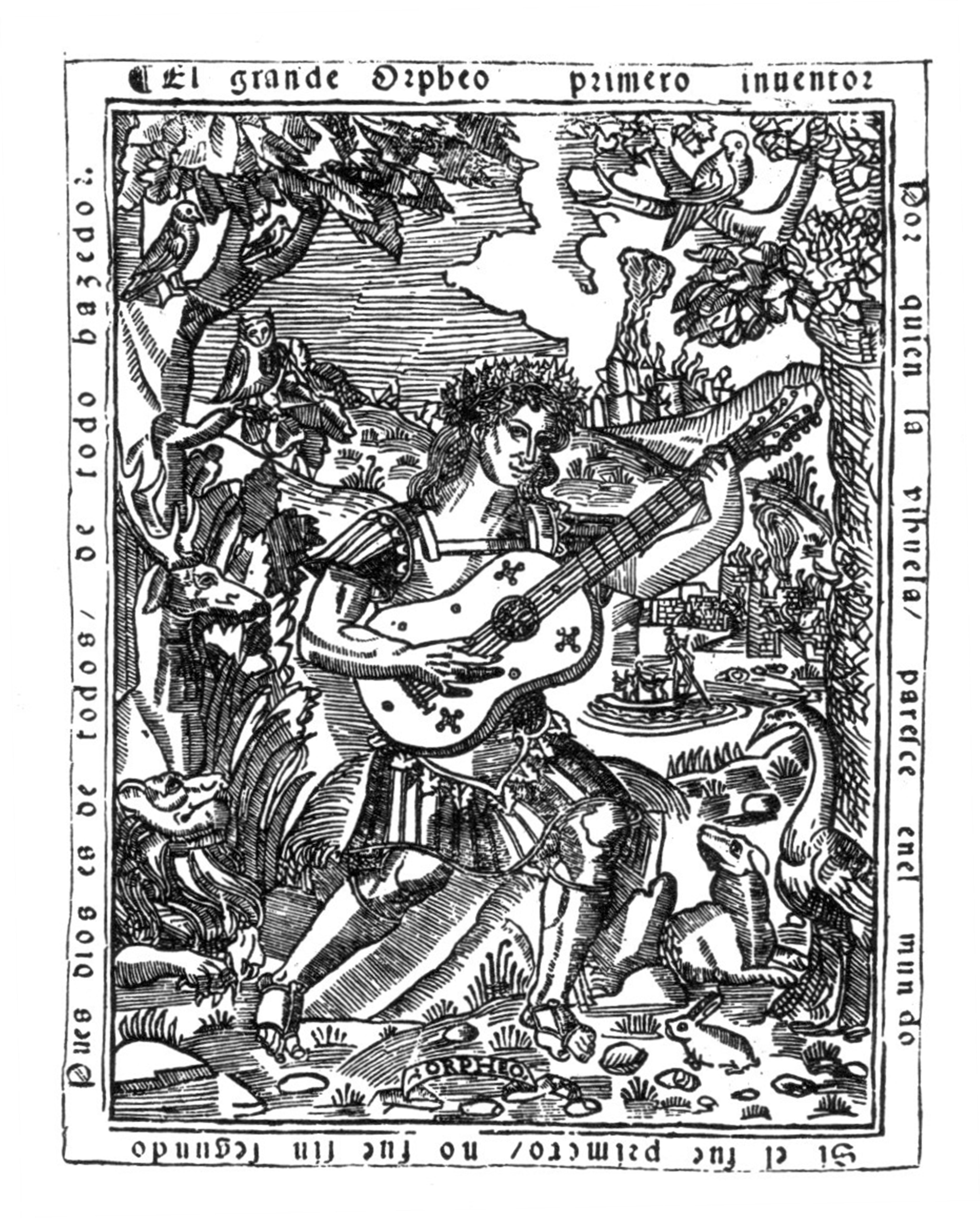
Frontispiece to Libro de música de vihuela de mano intitulado El maestro

Luis de Milán probably lived all his life in Valencia, though details are sketchy at best. He seems to have been employed by the Valencian court of Germaine de Foix until around 1538. In 1535 he published his first book, a parlor game with music called El juego de mandar. The next year he issued what would be his most important book, El maestro. This was the first printed collection of vihuela music, and both books were composed during his ducal court residence. It is likely that Milán was a Valencian nobleman who entered minor religious orders before later becoming the rector of a parish church. He would have eventually been married sometime before 1555, and died in 1559. Milán's final work titled El cortesano provides insight into court life and his musical ideas. It is clear that Milán, as well as notable poets such as Juan Fernández and Gil Polo, thought highly of his work and talent.

== El Maestro (1536) ==
Milán’s Libro de música de vihuela de mano intitulado El Maestro was printed in December 1536 and dedicated to King John III of Portugal. The dedication, and the inclusion of six villancicos in Portuguese, suggests that Milán traveled to that country and spent time there. El maestro is the earliest known Spanish publication with a collection of solo instrumental and accompanied music. The performer was typically both the singer and vihuelist. This collection marks the first use of printed Spanish tablature, as well as the introduction of written tempo instructions. These tempo's were typically maintained throughout the entire piece unless the work was written in the 'gallant' style, in which the tempo then varied between fast and slow. Similarly to the Neapolitan style of notation, El maestro uses the top line to represent the highest-pitched string.

El Maestro is the first collection of vihuela music, and was in part intended for students of the instrument, with scores presented in grades from simple to complex so that vihuelists could proceed from elementary to harder pieces. The book provides guidance to the reader on how to read tablature, select strings, and tune the vihuela. The set is divided into two books, one for the vihuela alone and the other for voice and vihuela. (A breakdown of its 72 works is at Spanish Wikipedia.) There are forty fantasías, six pavanas, and four tientos in the instrumental volume. For voice, there are twelve villancicos, four romances, and six sonetos (sonnets). All of these are to Castilian texts, except for the sonetos, which are in Italian, and half of the villancicos are in Portuguese, as noted above. While still innovative, El Maestro uses traditional styles of instrumental improvisation that are shaped by his self-taught background and his time at the Valencian court. Milán composed directly on the vihuela before writing down his music.

Much of the collection requires considerable virtuosity. Still, not all the ornamentation is provided in detail. The style of the compositions varies from simple homophony to polyphony and virtuoso passage-work; unusual chromaticism also occurs, including strange double-inflections which were quite rare in music from other parts of Europe at the time. This is especially true in Milán's villancicos, which were set to love poetry and followed an ABBA structure. These works were composed with two versions: a basic accompaniment allowing the singer to add ornaments, and an unembellished vocal line with a highly embellished vihuela part. While his compositions may have seemed somewhat unpolished compared to other vocal works of contemporary counterpoint, his mastery of his instrument and his refined writing for vihuela led him to success.

The largest section of El maestro consists of 40 fantasias and showcases these varying complexities. These pieces are structured as a series of contrasting sections. They remain unified through modal organization and similar motifs based upon familiar improvisational patterns by Milán. The fantasias generally follow a three-part structure: an imitative opening followed by short contrasting episodes, and concluding with a repeated final section and a short coda. This form also appears in the tientos of the gallant style. It appears that the book was prepared with great care; alternative passages are given for players who wish to avoid more virtuosic parts, sections of pieces are indicated as optional, and descriptive tempo indications are provided, for example, ni muy apriessa ni muy a espacio sino con un compás bien mesurado ("neither too quickly nor too slowly, but with a moderate measure").

== Late works ==
Milán’s last publication, El cortesano (1561), modeled on Il Cortegiano by Baldassare Castiglione, gives a vivid and entertaining picture of life in the Valencian ducal court. While it contains no music, it is a valuable account by a professional musician at the time.

== Legacy ==
Luis de Milán is most recognized for publishing the first printed collection of vihuela music, El maestro. The music of Luis de Milán is popular with performers on the present-day classical guitar because it can be adapted very easily to their instrument.

== List of Works ==
- Agora viniesse un viento
- Al amor quiero vencer
- Aquel cavallero
- Canción
- Con pavor recordo el moro
- Fantasía del octavo tono
- Fantasía del quarto tono
- O gelosia d'amanti
- O vos omnes qui transitis
- Quien amores ten
- Toda mi vida os ame

== Bibliography ==
- Articles "Vihuela" and "Luis de Milán," in The New Grove Dictionary of Music and Musicians, ed. Stanley Sadie. 20 vol. London, Macmillan Publishers Ltd., 1980. ISBN 1-56159-174-2
- Ruggero Chiesa: Luys Milán: El Maestro, Zerboni, Milano 1974 (commentary and transcription for guitar)
- Luis Gásser: Luis Milán on Sixteenth-Century Performance Practice, Indiana University Press, Bloomington & Indianapolis 1996
- John Griffiths: Luys Milán, The New Grove, New York 2001
- Ralf Jarchow: Luys Milán – El Maestro, Vol. 1–3, Jarchow, Glinde 1995 (commentary and transcription for guitar; German and English translation of Milán)
- Gustave Reese: Music in the Renaissance. New York, W.W. Norton & Co., 1954. ISBN 0-393-09530-4
- John M. Ward: The Vihuela de Mano and its Music (1536-1576), New York 1953 (Dissertation)

== Recordings ==
- Luis de Milán interpreted by Jordi Savall,
- Listen online (Magnatune) to "El Maestro" performed by Edward Martin or by Jacob Heringman and Catherine King.
- 2005 – Dulcis Melancholia. Biographie musicale de Marguerite d’Autriche. Capilla Flamenca. MEW 0525. Contains a recording of Pavane 4 and Pavane 5 (La bella franceschina) by Luis Milan.
