= Vihuela =

Spanish string instrument

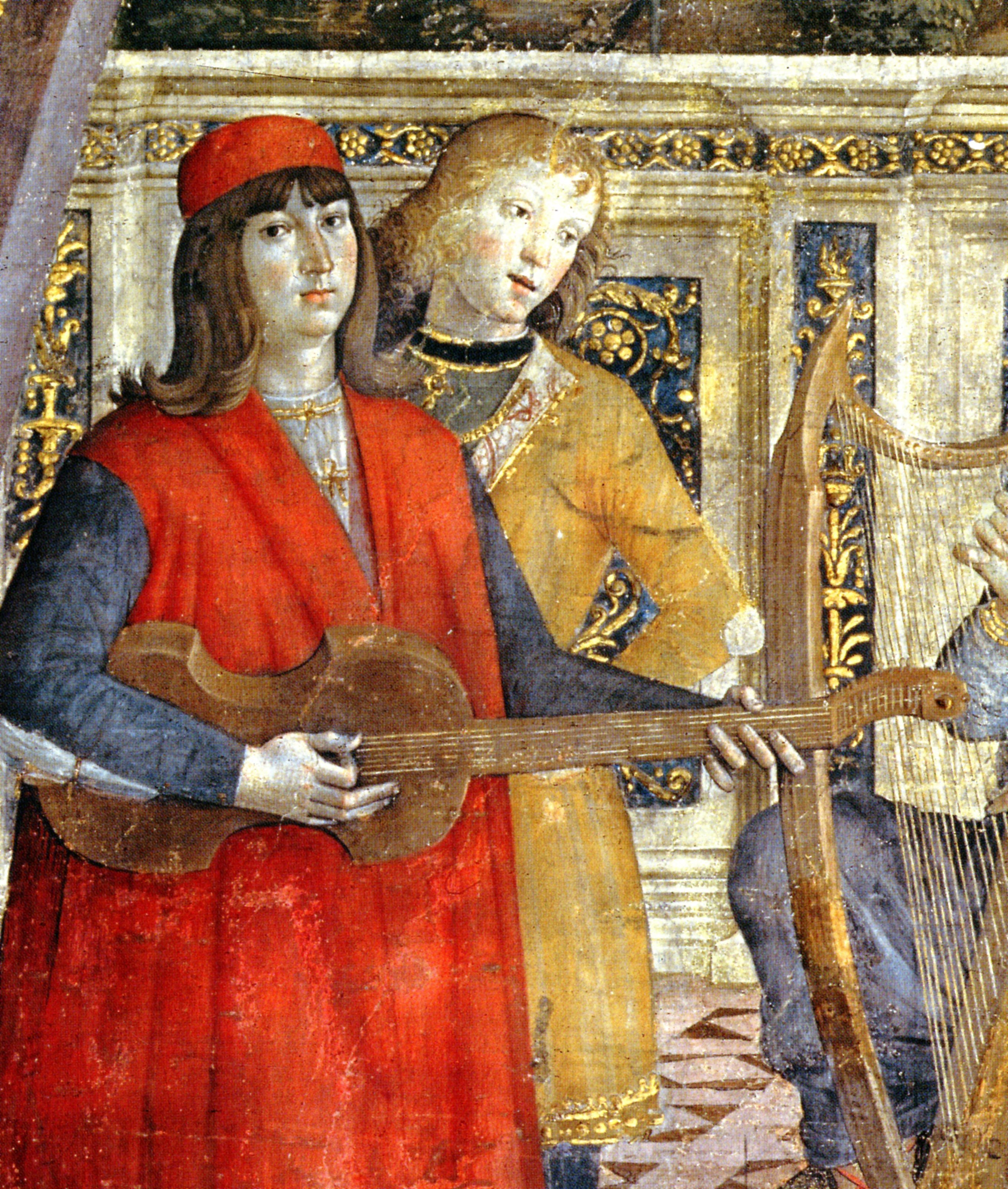
- Vihuela/vihuela de mano depicted by Pinturicchio in the late 15th century
- Classification: String instrument (plucked)
- Hornbostel–Sachs classification: 321.322 (Composite chordophone)
- Developed: Spain, mid-15th century

Related instruments
- Bowed and plucked string instruments

Sound sample
- Vihuela sample A vihuela playing 'Jamaica' from Playford's The Dancing Master (c.1670)

The vihuela (Spanish pronunciation: [biˈwela]) was a fretted string instrument developed in Spain during the 15th century and widely used there throughout the 16th century. In its best-known form, the vihuela de mano ("plucked vihuela"), it was plucked with the fingers, had a flat, waisted body resembling that of a guitar, and was typically tuned like a Renaissance lute. It became an important instrument for solo and accompanied music in 16th-century Spain, and a substantial repertory survives in printed collections.

The name vihuela was also applied to bowed instruments, known as vihuela de arco ("bowed vihuela"). The bowed vihuela developed in the Crown of Aragon, in eastern Spain, in the late 15th century and subsequently influenced the early development of the viol family.

== History ==
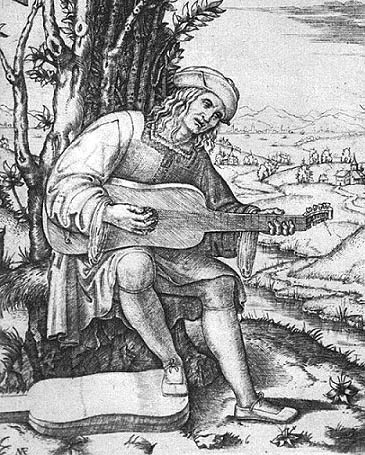
Viola da mano, detail from an engraving by Marcantonio Raimondi, was made before 1510. It depicts poet Giovanni Filoteo Achillini playing the instrument

The vihuela, as it was known in Spanish, was called the viola de mà in Catalan, viola da mano in Italian and viola de mão in Portuguese. The two names are functionally synonymous and interchangeable. In its most developed form, the vihuela was a guitar-shaped instrument with six double-strings (paired courses) made of gut. Vihuelas were tuned identically to their contemporary Renaissance lute; 4ths and one major 3rd (44344, almost like a modern guitar tuning, with the exception of the third string, which was tuned a semitone lower).

Plucked vihuelas, being essentially flat-backed lutes, evolved in the mid-15th century, in the Kingdom of Aragón, located in north-eastern Iberia (Spain). In Spain, Portugal, and Italy the vihuela was in common use by the late 15th through to the late 16th centuries. In the second half of the 15th century, some vihuela players began using a bow, leading to the development of the viol.

There were several different types of vihuela (or different playing methods at least):

- Vihuela de mano: 6 or 5 courses played with the fingers
- Vihuela de penola: played with a plectrum
- Vihuela de arco: played with a bow (ancestor of the viola da gamba)

Tunings for 6 course vihuela de mano (44344):

- G C F A D G
- C F B♭ D G C

Although mainstream use of the vihuela has faded away, traces of the complex polyphonic music that was its repertoire in the late 16th century, along with the other primary instrument of the Spanish and Portuguese Renaissance, the cross-strung harp, both of which can be heard in Mexican Mariachi music. The vihuela's descendants that are still played are the violas campaniças of Portugal. Much of the vihuela's place, role, and function was taken up by the subsequent Baroque guitar (also sometimes referred to as vihuela or bigüela). Despite the Mexican vihuela sharing its name with the Spanish vihuela, it is actually related to the timple. The vihuela is often used for the performance of early music, using modern replicas of historical instruments. Today, instruments like the tiple are descendants of vihuelas brought to America in the 16th century.

== Construction ==
Vihuela bodies were lightly constructed from thin flat slabs or pieces of wood, bent or curved as required. This construction method distinguished them from some earlier types of string instruments whose bodies (if not the entire instrument including the neck) were carved out from a solid single block of wood. The back and sides of common lutes were also made of pieces however, being multiple curved or bent staves joined and glued together to form a bowl, made from cypress with a spruce or cedar top.

Vihuela (and violas da gamba) were built in different sizes, large and small, a family of instruments. Duet music was published for vihuelas tuned one step, a minor third, a fourth, or a fifth apart, as well as unison tuned.

The physical appearance of vihuelas was varied and diverse; there was little standardization and no mass production. Overall and in general, vihuelas looked very similar to modern guitars. The first generation of vihuela, from the mid-15th century on, had sharp cuts to its waist, similar to that of a violin. A second generation of vihuela, beginning sometime around 1490, took on the now-familiar smooth-curved figure-eight shaped body contours. The sharp waist-cut models continued to be built into the early-to-mid-16th century, side by side with the later pattern. Many early vihuelas had extremely long necks, while others had the shorter variety. Top decoration, the number, shape, and placement, of sound holes, ports, pierced rosettes, etc., also varied greatly. More than a few styles of peg-boxes were used as well.

Vihuelas were chromatically fretted in a manner similar to lutes, by means of movable, wrapped-around and tied-on gut frets. Vihuelas, however, usually had ten frets, whereas lutes had only seven. Unlike modern guitars, which often use steel and bronze strings, vihuelas were gut strung, and usually in paired courses. Gut strings produce a sonority far different from metal, generally described as softer and sweeter. A six course vihuela could be strung in either of two ways: with 12 strings in 6 pairs, or 11 strings in total if a single unpaired chanterelle is used on the first (or highest pitched) course. Unpaired chanterelles were common on all lutes, vihuelas, and (other) early guitars (both Renaissance guitars and Baroque guitars).

== Repertoire ==
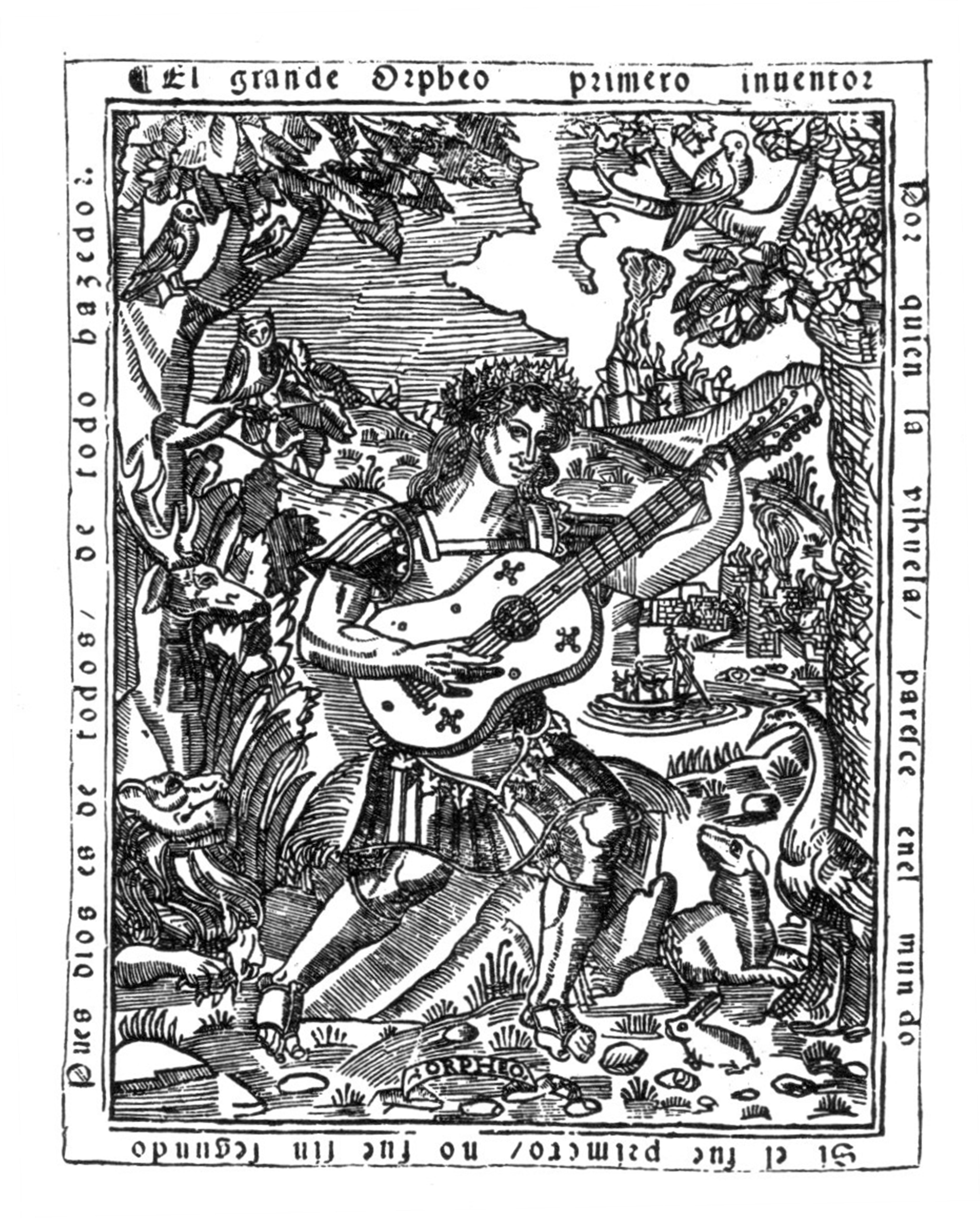
Orpheus playing a vihuela. Frontispiece from the famous book Libro de música de vihuela de mano intitulado El maestro by Luis de Milán, 1536

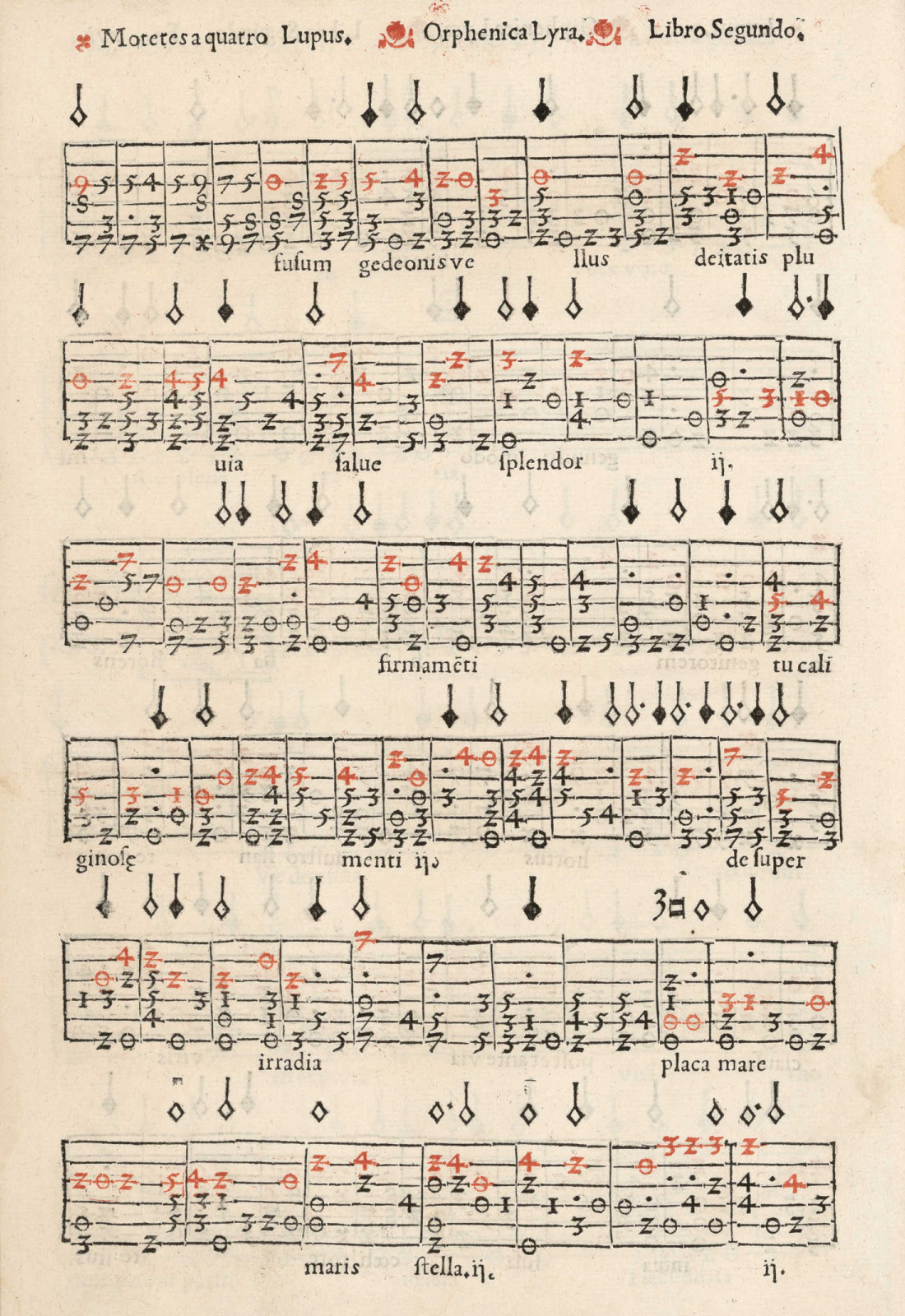
Example of numeric vihuela tablature from the book Orphenica Lyra by Miguel de Fuenllana (1554). Red numerals (original) mark the vocal part

The first person to publish a collection of music for the vihuela was the Spanish composer Luis de Milán, with his volume titled Libro de música de vihuela de mano intitulado El maestro of 1536 dedicated to King John III of Portugal. The notational device used throughout this and other vihuela music books is a numeric tablature (otherwise called "lute tablature"), which is also the model from which modern "guitar tab" was fashioned. The music is easily performed by retuning to Classic lute and vihuela tuning (44344). The tablature system used in all these texts is the "Italian" tablature, wherein the stopped frets are indicated by numbers and the lowest line of the staff represents the highest-pitch course (or string), resembling the neck of the instrument in playing position; Milán's book also uses numbers to indicate the stopping of the courses but exceptionally it is the top line of the staff that represents the highest-pitch course, as in "French" tablature.

The printed books of music for the vihuela which have survived are, in chronological order:

- El Maestro by Luis de Milán (1536)
- Los seys libros del Delphin by Luis de Narváez (1538)
- Tres Libros de Música by Alonso Mudarra (1546)
- Silva de Sirenas by Enríquez de Valderrábano (1547)
- Libro de Música de Vihuela by Diego Pisador (1552)
- Orphénica Lyra by Miguel de Fuenllana (1554)
- Libro de Cifra Nueva para tecla, arpa y vihuela by Luis Venegas de Henestrosa (1557)
- El Parnasso by Estevan Daça (1576)
- Obras de musica para tecla, arpa y vihuela by Antonio de Cabezón (1578)

== Surviving instruments ==
There are three surviving historic vihuelas:

- The 'Guadalupe' vihuela in the Musée Jacquemart-André
- The 'Chambure' instrument in the Cité de la Musique
- A relic of Saint Mariana de Jesús (1618–1645), kept in the Iglesia de la Compañia de Jesús de Quito.

Modern versions of the vihuela continue to be made. Performers adept with the vihuela include Robert MacKillop, Julian Bream, Eduardo Egüez and Hopkinson Smith.

== Gallery ==
Plucked and bowed

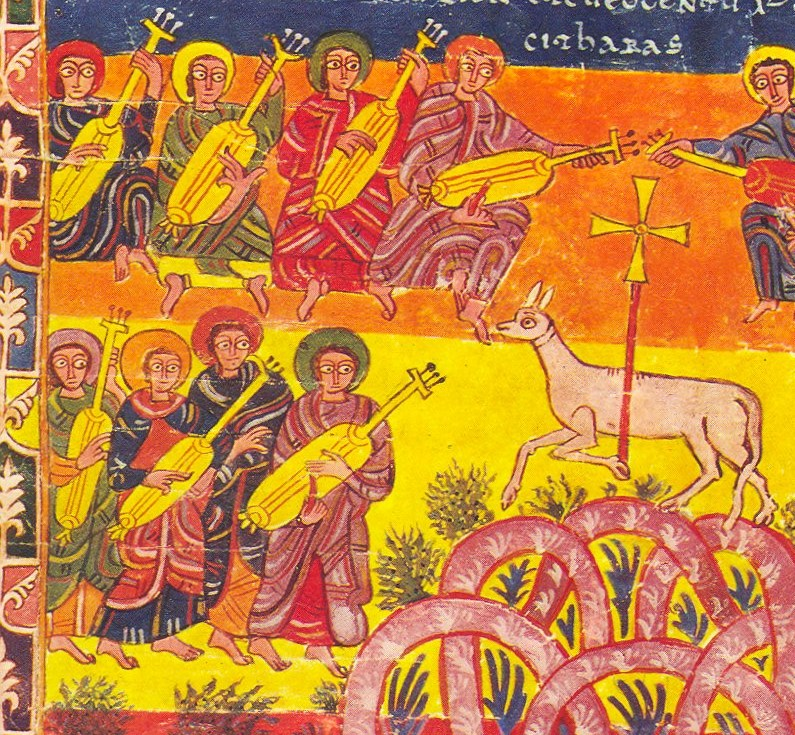
Spain, c. 960 a.d. "Cytharas" (identified from text) with players strumming with fingers (de mano) and plucking with plectrum (de penola). From Commentary on the Apocalypse, Morgan Library, Ms 644.

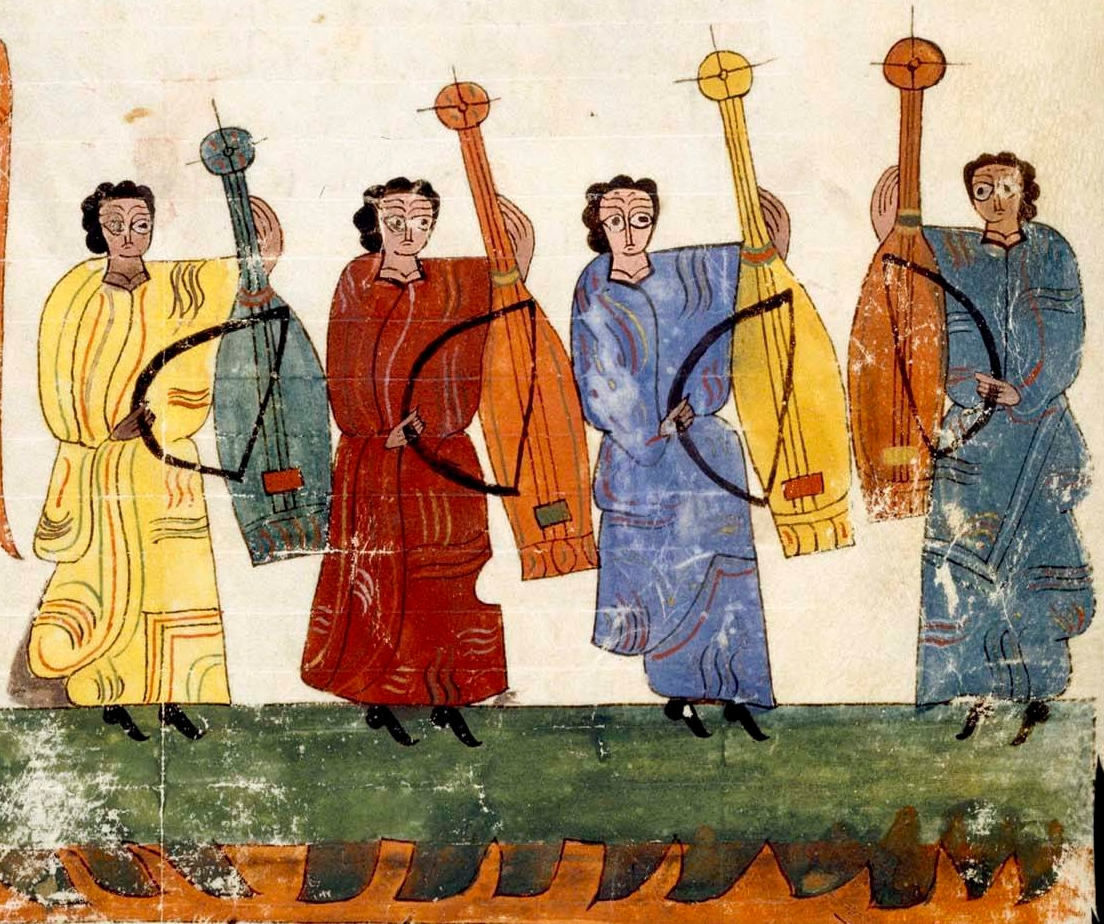
Spain, "second third of 10th century". Violas de arco played with a bow. Calling them "de arco" (with bow) indicates that other types exist. From Commentary on the Apocalypse, Codice VITR 14.1.

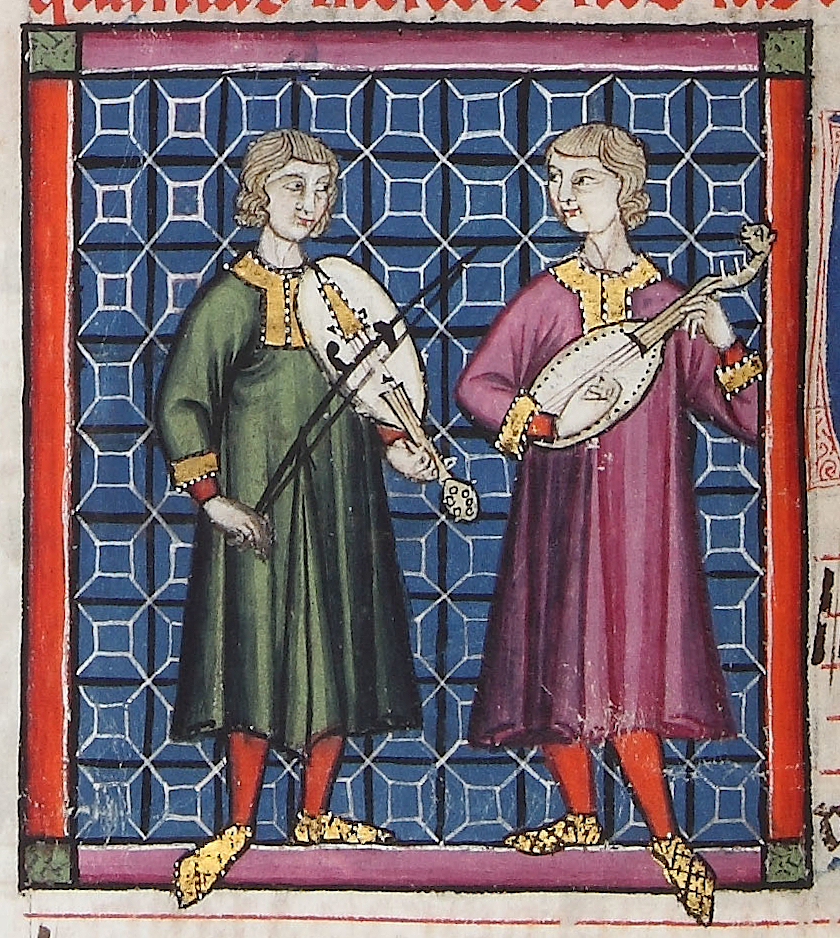
Musicians playing the vihuela (or vielle), one with a bow, the other plucked by hand, in the Cantigas de Santa Maria of Alfonso X of Castile, 13th century

Instruments from Spain that were labeled cytharas in the manuscripts have resemblances to other later instruments, and the names of these later instruments (coming from different languages) are similar to one another, vihuela, viola, vielle.
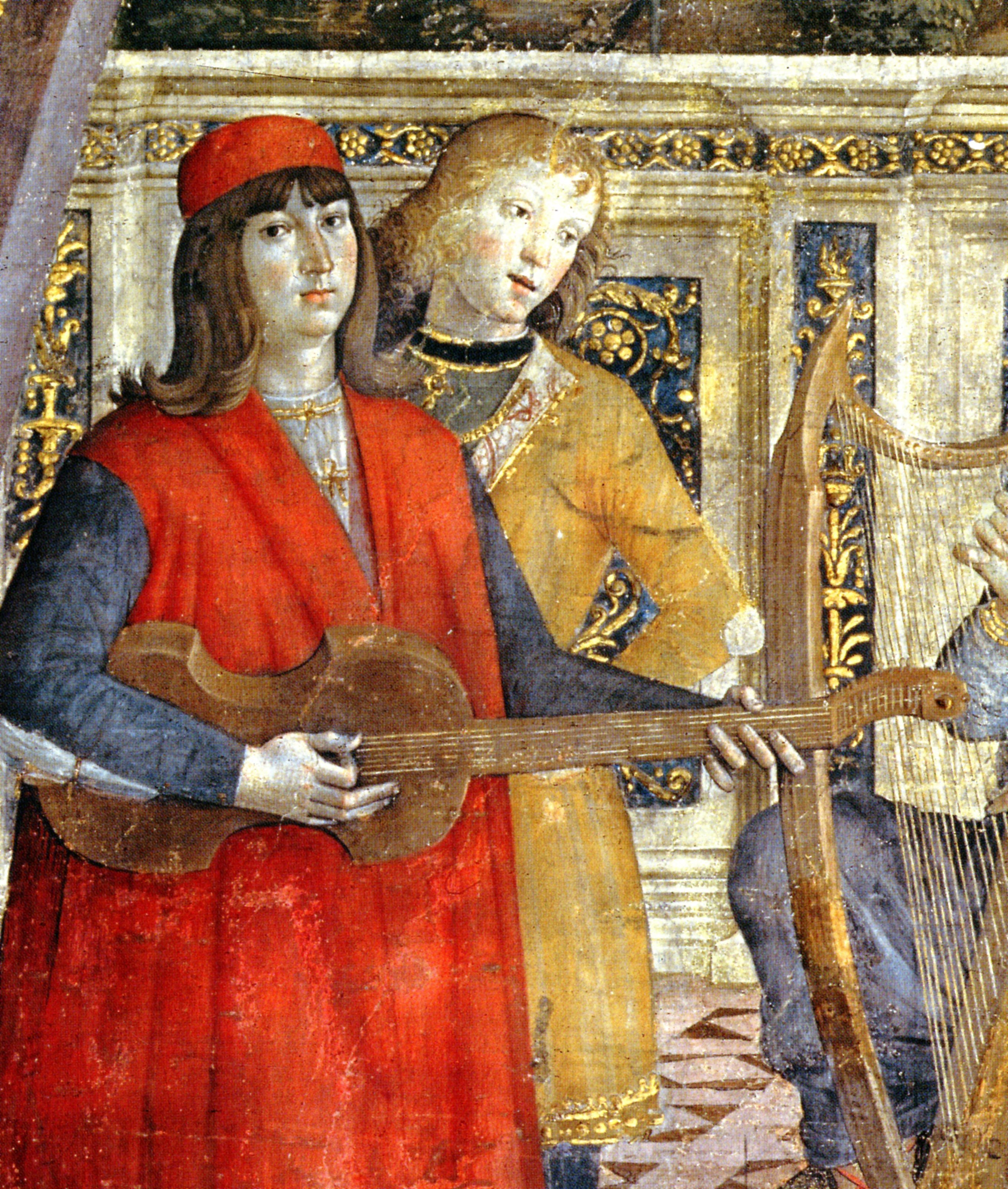
1493, Italy. Italian version of the instrument.

== See also ==
- Mexican vihuela

== Bibliography ==
- Ronald C. Purcell: Classic Guitar, Lute and Vihuela Discography, Belwin-Mills Publishing Corp., Melville, NY, 1976, 116 p., LC: 75-42912 (no ISBN) ("There are more than 100 artists listed as well as approximately 400 composers and 400 individual records.")
- Ian Woodfield: The Early History of the Viol, Cambridge University Press, Cambridge, 1984 (includes much early vihuela history; viols are bowed vihuelas)

== Notes ==
The words vihuela and viola are etymologically related.
