= Alonso Mudarra =

Spanish composer

Tiento para harpa
A work composed by Mudarra around 1546, and performed in 2008. The duration is 1:13.

Alonso Mudarra (c. 1510 – April 1, 1580) was a Spanish composer of the Renaissance, and also played the vihuela, a guitar-shaped string instrument. He was an innovative composer of instrumental music as well as songs, and was the composer of the earliest surviving music for the guitar.

== Biography ==
The place of his birth is not recorded, but he grew up in Guadalajara, and probably received his musical training there. He most likely went to Italy in 1529 with Charles V, in the company of the fourth Duke of the Infantado, Íñigo López de Mendoza, marqués de Santillana. When he returned to Spain he became a priest, receiving the post of canon at the cathedral in Seville in 1546, where he remained for the rest of his life. While at the cathedral, he directed all of the musical activities; many records remain of his musical activities there, which included hiring instrumentalists, buying and assembling a new organ, and working closely with composer Francisco Guerrero for various festivities. Mudarra died in Seville, and his sizable fortune was distributed to the poor of the city according to his will.

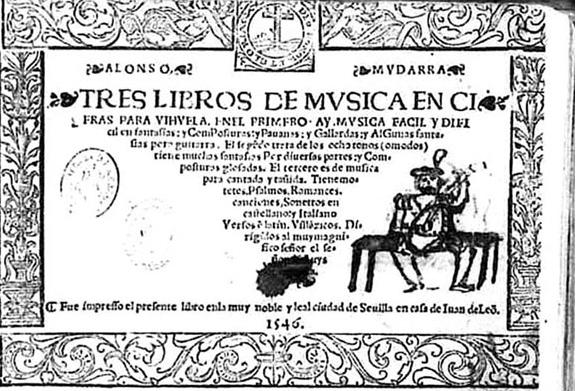
Title page of Mudarra's Tres libros de música en cifra para vihuela (Seville, 1546)

Mudarra wrote numerous pieces for the vihuela and the four-course guitar, all contained in the collection Tres libros de musica en cifras para vihuela ("Three books of music in numbers for vihuela"), which he published on December 7, 1546 in Seville. These three books contain the first music ever published for the four-course guitar, which was then a relatively new instrument. The second book is noteworthy in that it contains eight multi-movement works, all arranged by "tono", or mode.

Compositions represented in this publication include fantasias, variations (including a set on La Folia), tientos, pavanes and galliards, and songs. Modern listeners are probably most familiar with his Fantasia X, which has been a concert and recording mainstay for many years. The songs are in Latin, Spanish and Italian, and include romances, canciones (songs), villancicos, (popular songs) and sonetos (sonnets). Another innovation was the use of different signs for different tempos: slow, medium, and fast.

== References and further reading ==
- John Griffiths: "Alonso Mudarra", Grove Music Online ed. L. Macy (Accessed March 24, 2005), (subscription access)
- Gustave Reese, Music in the Renaissance. New York, W.W. Norton & Co., 1954. ISBN 0-393-09530-4
- Guitar Music of the Sixteenth Century, Mel Bay Publications (transcribed by Keith Calmes)
- The Eight Masterpieces of Alonso Mudarra, Mel Bay Publications (transcribed by Keith Calmes)
- Fantasia VI in hypermedia (Shockwave Player required) at the BinAural Collaborative Hypertext
- Jacob Heringman and Catherine King: "Alonso Mudarra songs and solos". Magnatune.com (http://www.magnatune.com/artists/albums/heringman-mudarra/hifi_play)
