= Rud =

Musical instrument

String instrument
- Classification: Necked bowl lutes; String instruments
- Developed: Antiquity

Related instruments
- Angélique (instrument); Archlute; Balalaika; Barbat (lute); Bağlama; Biwa; Bouzouki; Charango; Chitarra Italiana; Daguangxian; Đàn tỳ bà; Dombra; Domra; Dutar; Electric pipa; Erhu; Irish bouzouki; Liuqin; Lute; Mandocello; Mandola; Mandolin; Mandolute; Oud; Pandura; Pipa; Qanbus; Rubab; Setar; Sitar; Surbahar; Tambura; Tanbur; Tanbur (Turkish); Tembûr; Theorbo; Tiorbino; Tiqin; Topshur; Veena; Zhonghu

The rud (Persian: رود) is a Persian stringed musical instrument. In Persian, the word means "string". It has been mentioned in classical Persian literature by Rudaki, Hafez, Naser Khusraw, Sanai, Ferdowsi, Nizami and Qatran Tabrizi other poets. The Arabic 'Ud, whose etymology is not yet convincingly explained, may well have been derived from the Persian word rud.

The Persian poet Ferdowsi states about it:
همه شب ببودند با نای و رود

همی داد هرکس به خسرو درود.

All night they were listening to the sound of the reed and the rud
Everyone who came to the banquet, paid his respect to the Khusraw

In his treatise, Abd al-Qadir Maraghi mentions the rud: "Rud Khwani: Up to half of its surface is covered by skin, and frets are fastened to it; it has four strings. It is played like an ancient ud."

Researchers have found out that the first examples of the rud were made of gourds, and that the strings were made of silk and animal gut. It is remarkable that its appearance reminds one of a gourd.

Its structure differs from that of other string instruments. Fish skin is pulled over half of the body's surface, and the other part is made of pine. Primarily, the instrument was played with the fingers; later it was played with the help of a plectrum made of soft material. The rud's body is made of mulberry wood and apricot wood, the neck and head are made of nut wood, and the pegs are made of pear wood. A total of 12 frets are fastened to the instrument's fret-board. The timbre of its sound is low.

The total length of the instrument is 860 mm. The length of the body is 495 mm, the width is 335 mm and the height is 170 mm. The length of the neck is 285 mm. The scale of the rud ranges from the "mi" of the great octave to the "si" of the second octave.

== See also ==
- Persian traditional music
- Azerbaijani music
- Cobza
- Shahrud
