= Shahrud =

Musical instrument

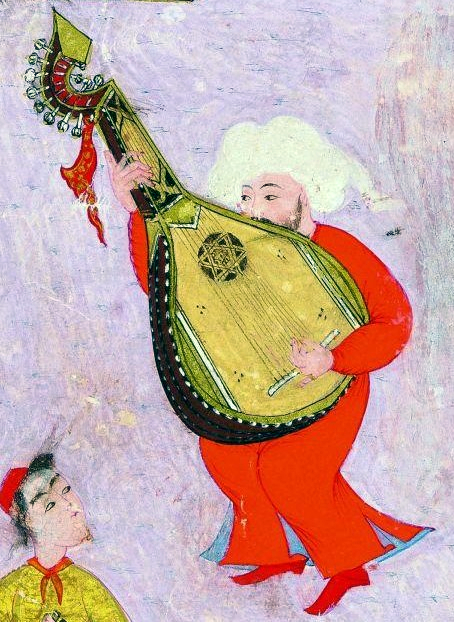
- A man plays an Ottoman shahrud, from a 1582 A.D., from an illustration in the Surname-i Hümayun.

String instrument
- Classification: Necked bowl lutes; String instruments
- Developed: Antiquity

Related instruments
- Archlute; Barbat; Chitarra Italiana; Lute; Mandobass; Oud; Rud; Sarod; Surbahar

The Shahrud (Turkish: Şehrud, from Persian: شاهرود, DMG šāh-rūd or šāh-i-rūd) was a short-necked lute, illustrated in the Surname-i Hümayun, resembling an oud or barbat, but being much larger. The larger size gave the instrument added resonance and a deeper (bass) range, like the modern mandobass, mandolone or Algerian mandole.

The word also referred to a type of zither written about by Al Farabi and illustrated in his book Kitāb al-mūsīqī al kabīr. That illustration has led scholars to speculate the instrument was a box-zither, or a harp combined with a psaltery. The šāh-rūd was introduced to Samarkand in the early 10th century and spread to Middle Eastern Arabic music.

Another writer who referred to the instrument was Abd al-Qadir in his work Maqasid al-Alhan (Arabic for: purports of Music)(مقاصد الحان). al-Qadir was interested in the restoration and improvement of stringed musical instruments, and his work provides information about numerous musical instruments, including the shahrud.

== Etymology ==
The Persian word šāh-rūd is made up of šāh, "king" (shah) and rūd, which, like tār, contains the basic meaning "string". Rūd is a historical oriental lute instrument, while the long-necked lute tār is still played in Iranian music today. The Iranian musician Abd al-Qadir (Ibn Ghaybi; † 1435) from Maragha in northwestern Iran mentioned the lute rūd chātī (also rūd chānī) alongside rūdak and rūḍa. Two centuries later, the Ottoman travel writer Evliya Çelebi (1611 – after 1683) described the lute rūḍa as similar to the čahārtār, a nominal four-stringed instrument. The Arab historian al-Maqqari (c. 1577–1632) refers to a 13th-century source that the rūḍa was found in Andalusia.

The šāh-rūd, "the king of the lutes", may have given its name to the North Indian shell-necked sarod lute developed in the 1860s from the Afghan rubāb. However, the Persian word sarod in several spelling variants has been used for much longer to describe lute instruments and generally stands for "music". In Balochistan, the bowed sounds surod and sorud, which are similar to the Indian sarinda, are known.

A stringed instrument called şehrud in the Ottoman period, which frequently appears in 15th and 16th century Ottoman miniature paintings and Persian miniatures during the Timurid Empire (1370–1507) as an oversized pot-bellied variant of the short-necked lute Oud, is named with the medieval šāh- rūd-, but obviously not related in form. The extent to which this instrument was widespread in Arabic music is unclear. Miniatures of the 1582 Ottoman manuscript Surname-i Hümayun show court musicians playing alongside the şehrud, which according to its oversized depiction was probably a bass lute, playing the historical angle harp çeng, the plucked lute kopuz, the bowed lute kemânçe, the pan flute mıskal, the long flute ney and the frame drum daf.

== Design ==
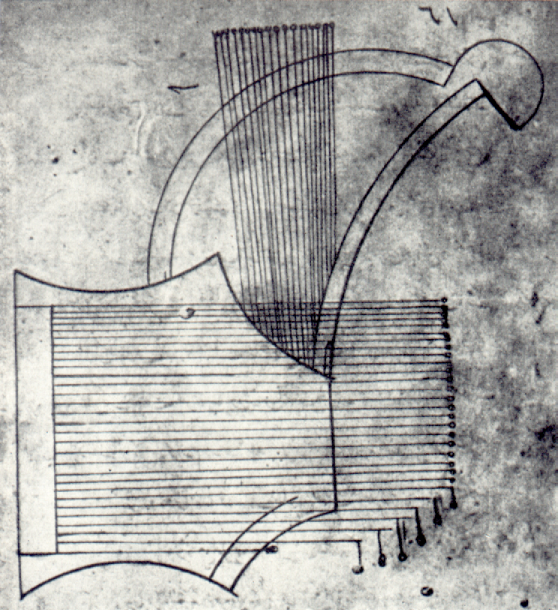
Illustration from Al-Fārābī (about 870-950): Kitāb al-mūsīqī al kabīr Drawing of a musical instrument, called ""šāh-rūd"")

A published account of the šāh-rūd comes from a 13th-century manuscript preserved in the National Library in Cairo, the only other from what is believed to be a 12th-century manuscript in the Biblioteca Nacional in Madrid. The Madrid depiction is more closely surrounded by writing, executed less carefully and without compasses; structurally, the two do not differ. The Cairo drawing, on the other hand, is carefully constructed with compass and ruler. It is unclear whether both drawings are based on the same or a different template, or whether the later Cairo drawing was copied from the earlier one in Madrid. From archaeologically excavated clay figures, Sassanid rock-reliefs or Persian book miniatures often give a rough idea of the appearance of historical musical instruments, only the number of strings is usually adapted to artistic requirements and is rarely realistic. This also applies to the generally more reliable representations in musicological works. For example, the ornamental embellishments of an angular harp (čang) in a 13th-century drawing belong more to artistic license than to actual appearance. Harps are often depicted without any strings at all or with strings leading out into the void. Sometimes the musician might not be able to hold his instrument in the manner shown or he might not be able to grip the strings.

In the illustration of the šāh-rūd, the parallel strings run across the top like a box zither, but end somewhere outside on the right side. The six shorter (highest) strings are snapped off at their ends. A second bundle of strings leading upwards at right angles to it is enclosed in a curved wooden frame resembling the yokes of a lyre or the frame of a harp. These strings also end outside the construction. One explanation for why both string systems protrude beyond the instrument could be that the draftsman continued to draw the string ends, which hang down after their point of attachment and were often provided with an appendage and left for decoration, as a straight line. The Madrid instrument has 40 strings, 27 of which run across the closed body and 13 perpendicular to the frame; the drawing from Cairo shows a šāh-rūd with 48 strings, 29 strings across the body and 19 to the frame.

The musicologist and orientalist Rodolphe d'Erlanger (1872-1932), whose six-volume work edition La musique arabe contains a translation of al-Fārābī's Kitāb al-Mūsīqā al-kabīr in the first two volumes, classified the šāh-rūd as a zither in 1935. Henry George Farmer (1882–1965) previously called it an 'archlute or zither' in A History of Arabian Music (1929), adding that it was "certainly an archlute by the early 15th century," twice the length of a lute. Influenced by d'Erlanger, others wanted to see a harp or psaltery, which is why Farmer in The Sources of Arabian Music (1940) turned it into a "Harp Psaltery". In the first edition of the Encyclopaedia of Islam (1934), Farmer had mentioned the šāh-rūd in the article ʿŪd, i.e. with the oriental lute instruments. This Farmers section was included unchanged in the 2000 reissue, as Farmer later reverted to his original view. Accordingly, one set of strings should be thought of as melody strings over a fretboard and the other set of strings as drone strings leading to separate pegs. This view is reinforced by al-Fārābī, who distinguished this particular instrument from the angular harps (Persian čang, Arabic ǧank) and from the lyres (Arabic miʿzafa). Pavel Kurfürst agreed with Farmer's interpretation as a “Harp Psaltery”. The kanun player and music historian George Dimitri Sawa, on the other hand, speaks of a zither. Al-Fārābī gave a pitch range of four octaves in the 10th century. According to Abd al-Qadir, the šāh-rūd had ten double strings in the 15th century and was twice as long as the oud .

In addition to the two depictions of the Kitāb al-Mūsīqā, a differently drawn šāh-rūd is depicted in the incunabula from 1474 of the work Quaestiones in librum II sententiarum written by Johannes Duns Scotus. The incunable is in the Ethnographic Museum in Brno kept in the Czech Republic and probably originated in Brno. The stringed instrument, depicted as a colored pen drawing in a decorative border between plant ornaments, is held in the hand of a standing musician. This instrument with a different body shape, but also with inwardly curved edges and without sound holes, as in the Arabic manuscripts, is shown in perspective in the playing position and thus allows an estimation of its size. On the other hand, the number of strings remains unclear here, since only as many strings were drawn in parallel as was possible in the 25 millimeter long illustration. In the Arabic drawings, the corpus has six edges, in the Brno depiction there is one more, which may be due to inaccuracy. Judging by the coloring, parchment would have been possible as a soundboard.

== Distribution ==
The šāh-rūd goes back to a musician named Ḫulaiṣ ibn al-Aḥwaṣ (also called Ḥakīm ibn Aḥwaṣ al-Suġdī), who introduced this instrument to Samarkand in 918/19 A.D. and traveled with it in Central Asian Sogdia. It later spread to Iraq, Syria and Egypt.

Arabic instrumental music seems to have changed considerably around this time, according to the Kitāb al-Mūsīqā al-kabīr. In the 19th century the slender, solid form of the barbaṭ developed into the form of the short-necked lute known today with a round body made of glued lathes of wood, which since then has been the most popular Arabic stringed instrument under the name oud. Also developed was the Tuhfat al-'Oudwas, a lute half the size of the oud. The “perfect lute” (ʿūd kāmil) with five double strings was the benchmark. During the rule of the Abbasids, as stated by al-Fārābī, there were two distinct long-necked lutes, the older ṭunbūr al-mīzanī (also ṭunbūr al-baghdādī) and the ṭunbūr al-churasānī, both named after their areas of distribution, Baghdad and Khorasan, respectively. In addition, there were the rarer plucked-stringed instruments, of which the lyre (miʿzafa) was used more frequently than the harp (ǧank), and the trapezoid box-zither (qānūn). Singers accompanied themselves on lute instruments, and no account is known of a singer playing a lyre or harp himself.

The šāh-rūd is documented up to the 15th century. For the 16th century its existence is no longer verifiable. A similarly complicated stringed instrument is an archlute built by Wendelin Tieffenbrucker (German luthier, active 1570–1610) with parallel strings attached to the side of a harp-like frame (a harp lute). This exceptional, unique piece, made no later than 1590, had a pitch range of 6.5 octaves and could be a successor to the šāh-rūd, which the lute maker Tiefenbrucker may have known.

== Literature ==
- Al-Fārābī : Kitāb al-Mūsīqi al-Kabīr. Translated into Persian by A. Azarnush, Tehran 1996, p. 55.
- Henry George Farmer : Islam. (Heinrich Besseler, Max Schneider (eds.): History of Music in Pictures. Volume III. Music of the Middle Ages and the Renaissance. Delivery 2). German music publisher, Leipzig 1966, pp. 96, 116.
- Henry George Farmer: A History of Arabian Music to the XIIIth Century. Luzac, London 1973, p. 154, p. 209; archive.org (1st edition: 1929).
- Henry George Farmer: ʿŪd. In: The Encyclopedia of Islam. new edition. Volume 10. Brill, Leiden 2000, p. 769.
- Pavel Kurfürst: The Šáh-rúd. In: Archives for Musicology. Volume 41, issue 4. Steiner, Stuttgart 1984, pp. 295–308.

== See also ==
- Persian traditional music
- Turkish music
- Azerbaijani music
- Cobza
- Rud
