= List of musical instruments by Hornbostel–Sachs number: 321.321 =

This is a list of instruments by Hornbostel–Sachs number, covering those instruments that are classified under 321.321 under that system. These instruments are known as necked bowl lutes.

3: Instruments in which sound is produced by one or more vibrating strings (chordophones, string instruments).

32: Instruments in which the resonator and string bearer are physically united and can not be separated without destroying the instrument

321: Instruments in which the strings run in a plane parallel to the sound table (lutes)

321.3: Instruments in which the string bearer is a plain handle (handle lutes)

321.32: Instrument in which the handle is attached to, or carved from, the resonator, like a neck (necked lutes)

321.321: Instrument whose body is shaped like a bowl (necked bowl lutes)

These instruments may be classified with a suffix, based on how the strings are caused to vibrate.

- 4: Hammers or beaters
- 5: Bare hands and fingers
- 6: Plectrum
- 7: Bowing
  - 71: Using a bow
  - 72: Using a wheel
  - 73: Using a ribbon
- 8: Keyboard
- 9: Using a mechanical drive

== List ==
| Instrument | Tradition | Hornbostel–Sachs classification | Description |
|---|---|---|---|
| angélique | French classical music | 321.321 | Pear-shaped, plucked, with 15-17 strings |
| archlute Italian arciliuto, Erzlaute, Архилютня | Western classical music | 321.321 | Plucked |
| baglamas | Greece | 321.321 | Pear-shaped, long-necked |
| bağlama | Middle East and Central Asia | 321.321 | |
| balalaika | Russia | 321.321 | Triangle-shaped lute-type instrument |
| bandora | | 321.321 | |
| bandura | Ukraine | 321.321 | Diatonic, unfretted lute-like string instrument, traditionally carved from a single block of wood |
| banduria | Philippines | 321.321 | Pear-shaped mandolin-like instrument, part of the rondalla tradition of ensemble playing of plucked instruments including bandurias, octavinas, laúds, guitars, and basses. |
| banhu | China | 321.321 | Two-stringed, bowed instrument |
| banzouki | | 321.321 | |
| barbat | Persian | 321.321 | |
| biwa | Japan | 321.321-6 | Short-necked, fretted, played with plectrum |
| bouzouki | Greece, Modern | 321.321 | String instrument with a pear-shaped body and a long neck, played with plectrum |
| buzuq | Middle Eastern | 321.321 | Long-necked, fretted |
| charango charanga | Bolivia | 321.321-6 | Fretted, hollow-bodied bowl lute, usually with four or five doubled strings, with as many as eleven tunings, traditionally made from an armadillo shell |
| charango charanga, chillador | Peru | 321.321-6 | Guitar-like instrument, most commonly with ten strings in two courses and made from an armadillo back |
| chillador | | 321.321 | Small fretted instrument |
| chitarra Italiana | Renaissance Italy | 321.322 | Plucked |
| çifteli çiftelia, qifteli or qyfteli | Albania | 321.321-5 | Fretted pear-shaped bowl lute with a neck, played by plucking. |
| cimboa | Cape Verde | 321.322 | Bowed |
| cittern | | 321.322 | |
| dambura | Afghanistan, Tajikistan and Uzbekistan | 321.321 | Wooden plucked instrument |
| Đàn gáo | Vietnam | 321.321 | Bowed two-stringed instrument |
| Đàn tỳ bà | Vietnam | 321.321 | Plucked four-stringed instrument |
| dangubica | Croatia | 321.321 | |
| dilruba | India | 321.321 | |
| dombra | Central Asia | 321.321-6 | Fretted, long-necked lute with a round body, played by plucking with a plectrum |
| domra | Russia | 321.321 | |
| dotara | Bangladesh | 321.321 | |
| dramyin dranyen, dramnyen | Bhutan | 321.321 | Seven-stringed lute, fretless, long-necked and double-waisted with rosette-shaped sound hole |
| dutar | Central Asia | 321.321 | Long-necked, two-stringed instrument |
| erhu | China | 321.321 | Two-stringed, bowed instrument |
| erxian | China, especially Cantonese | 321.321 | Two-stringed, bowed instrument |
| esraj | India | 321.321 | |
| gadulka | Bulgaria | 321.321 | |
| gambus | Arab | 321.321 | |
| gittern guitarra, guiterne or guiterre, Italy, quintern | Europe | 321.321 | stringed instrument, typical four courses/8 strings, more courses possible, also possible to string with 4-6 single strings |
| gusle gusla | Southeastern Europe | 321.321-71 | Stringed instrument, round, typically with one string bound at the top of the neck with a tuning peg |
| huluhu | China | 321.321 | Two-stringed, bowed instrument |
| igil | Tuva | 321.321 | |
| jing erhu | China | 321.321 | |
| kamancheh | Persian | 321.321 | |
| kobyz | Kazakhstan | 321.321 | |
| komuz | Kyrgyzstan | 321.321 | Three-stringed fretless lute, made from wood with gut strings |
| laouto | Greece | 321.321 | |
| laúd | Spain | 321.321 | |
| lavta | Armenia, Greece, Turkey | 321.321 | |
| liuqin | China | 321.321 | Four-stringed |
| mandola | | 321.321 | |
| mandolin | Italy. Spread to Europe and worldwide. | 321.321 | Fretted stringed instrument, short-necked, typically 4 courses/8 strings. The types belonging to this category have a flat or canted soundboard and round bowl-back Mandolin performance |
| mandolin, octave | | 321.321 | |
| mando-bass | | 321.321 | Bass mandolin |
| mandocello | | 321.321 | |
| mandolute | | 321.321 | |
| mandore mandora (not the bass range instrument), mandola (not the same as the modern mandola), vandola, mandörgen, quinterne | Europe | 321.321 | stringed instrument, strung either 4-6 single strings or 4-6 courses of 2 strings |
| mandriola | | 321.321 | |
| orpharion | | 321.321 | |
| oud | Arab | 321.321-6 | Pear-shaped fretless stringed instrument, with five courses of two strings and a single eleventh string, a bent back and a bowl-shaped body, often with up to three soundholes, played with a pick |
| pandur | Chechnya | 321.321 | |
| pandura | | 321.321 | |
| panduri | Georgia | 321.321 | |
| pipa | China | 321.321-5 | Pear-shaped bowl lute with a neck, played by plucking |
| rubab rabab | Afghanistan | 321.321-6 | Short-necked three-stringed lute with sympathetic and drone strings, fretted and plucked with a plectrum, with a double-chambered body, the lower part of which is covered in skin, and with three main strings |
| sallaneh | | 321.321 | |
| Saraswati veena | India | 321.321 | |
| Šargija | Southeastern Europe | 321.321 | |
| saz bağlama, kopuz | Turkey | 321.321-6 | Fretted lute with a long neck, pear-shaped body, and three courses of seven steel strings |
| setar | Iran | 321.321 | Pear-shaped lute with a long neck, three or four strings, plucked with the index finger of the right hand |
| sitar | India | 321.321 | |
| surbahar | India | 321.321 | |
| tamburica tamburitza | Croatia | 321.321 | Lute-like stringed instrument with a long neck, picked or strummed, variable number of strings |
| theorbo | Europe | 321.321 | Lute-like stringed instrument with an extended neck and two pegboxes. |
| tricordia | | 321.321 | |
