= Giovanni Zamboni =

Italian Baroque composer

Giovanni Zamboni (also: Giovanni Zamboni Romano; fl. early 18th century, possibly 1664–1721) was a baroque composer.

Zamboni was an able musician who mastered theorbo, lute, guitar, mandola, mandoline and harpsichord, and was one of the last composers to write for the lute. He was also skilled in counterpoint and wrote two cycles of 12 madrigals.

His works include (Sonate d'intavolatura di liuto Op. 1), a set of 11 Sonatas and a Ciaccona for the archlute published in 1718.
