= Kwitra =

Algerian stringed instrument

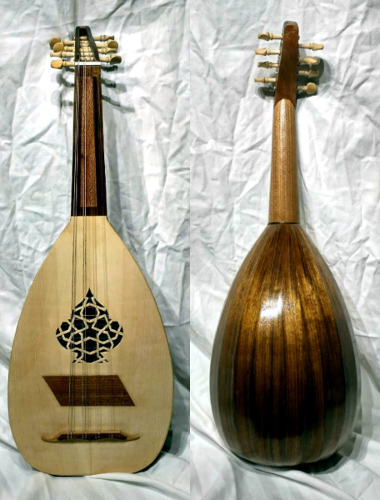
- Kwitra

String instrument
- Other names: Kouitra, quitra, quwytara
- Classification: String instrument
- Hornbostel–Sachs classification: (Composite chordophone)

Related instruments
- Oud, mandolin, mandolute

The kwitra (also quwaytara, kouitra and quitra; in Arabic: الكوترة (a-kwitra)) is an Algerian stringed instrument, sometimes referred to as the Algerian lute. The instrument is tied to Andalusian musical traditions of Moorish people who were pushed out of the Iberian peninsula in the 15th century. That tradition has shrunk further; where the kwitra was once seen in Algeria, today it is mainly an Algerian instrument.

The literal meaning of kwitra in Algerian Arabic (and possibly in the extinct Andalusian Arabic) is "small guitar". It is a regional instrument in the lute family of instruments, related to Italian chitarra.

It has eight strings in four courses. It is tuned G3 G3, E4 E4, A3 A3, D4 D4. The traditional strings are made of animal intestines. They usually have a carved soundhole in the shape of a bowl or vase.

== Historically prominent musicians ==
- Cheikh Sfindja
- Mouzino
- Mohamed Ben Teffahi
- Ahmed Essabti
- Mohammed Bahar (recordings exist)
- Philippe Lourenço
- Faten Sioud
- Ahmed Echaytan
