= Tiorbino =

Stringed musical instrument

- Classification: Necked bowl lutes; String instruments

Related instruments
- Angélique; Archlute; Balalaika; Barbat (lute); Bağlama; Baglamas; Biwa; Bouzouki; Charango; Chitarra Italiana; Daguangxian; Đàn tỳ bà; Dombra; Domra; Dutar; Electric pipa; Erhu; Irish bouzouki; Liuqin; Lute; Mandocello; Mandola; Mandolin; Oud; Pandura; Pipa; Rubab; Setar; Sitar; Surbahar; Tambouras; Tanbur; Tanbur (Turkish); Tembûr; Theorbo; Tiorbino; Tiqin; Topshur; Veena; Zhonghu

A tiorbino, a small theorbo (tiorbo in Italian), is a rare stringed instrument, a type of long-necked lute resembling a theorbo but significantly smaller and pitched an octave higher. The tiorbino was created in the late 16th century and was played in the 17th century, as in the 1622 composition Capricci a due stromenti cioe tiorba e tiorbino e per sonar varie sorti de balli.. by Bellerofonte Castaldi. The tiorbino was then abandoned, only to return in the late 20th century with the renaissance of interest in early music.

The sound of the tiorbino has been described by the lutenist Paul O'Dette as "a cross between a lute, a baroque guitar, and a harp." Although the tiorbino is not large, its sound carries well. It was used as a basso continuo instrument and was "a valuable addition to the tonal landscape available to the continuo player."

== See also ==
- Torban, a Ukrainian descendant of the theorbo
