= Weymann guitars =

American musical instrument manufacturer

Weymann & Sons
- Formerly: Weymann & Son; Keystone State; Weymann & Co.
- Company type: Private
- Industry: Musical instruments
- Founded: 1864; 162 years ago in Philadelphia
- Founder: Henry Arnold Weyman
- Headquarters: Philadelphia, United States
- Key people: (Founder) Harry William Weymann
- Products: Classical, acoustic and tenor guitars, banjos, mandolutes, ukuleles

Weymann Guitars is an American manufacturing company of musical instruments. Established in 1864 in Philadelphia, Weymann is one of the oldest instrument companies in the country. Originally founded as "H. A. Weymann and Son" by German immigrant Henry Arnold Weymann (Wegmann), Weymann patented the mandolute and also developed the first "Jumbo" body acoustic guitar produced during the turn of the century, nearly two decades before competitors in the instrument industry.

Weymann's most notable artists include Jerry Garcia of the Grateful Dead & Jimmie Rodgers who is considered the pioneering father of country music.

Since its inception, the company has manufactured classical, acoustic and tenor guitars, banjos, the aforementioned mandolute and ukuleles.

== Early history ==
=== H. A. Weymann ===
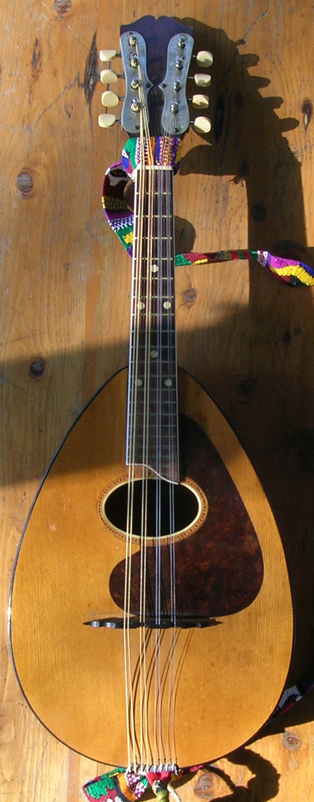
Mandolute, patented by Weymann in 1913

H. A. Weymann (Wegmann) migrated to America in 1852, arriving in Philadelphia, Pennsylvania. H. A. Weymann was naturalized in 1858. In 1864, H.A. Weymann commenced a small business and in 1865, H. A. was reported in the Philadelphia Inquirer as having an annual taxable income of $136. It has been said, H. A. Weymann's early business was in the jewelry & watch retail, along with clocks, harmonicas, sheet music, and small general retail goods. Weymann had 7 children, his first born being Harry William (H. W.) Weymann.

=== H. W. Weymann ===
When H.A. Weymann died in 1892, it was Harry who took control of the business, and retained the name business name.

== Innovations ==
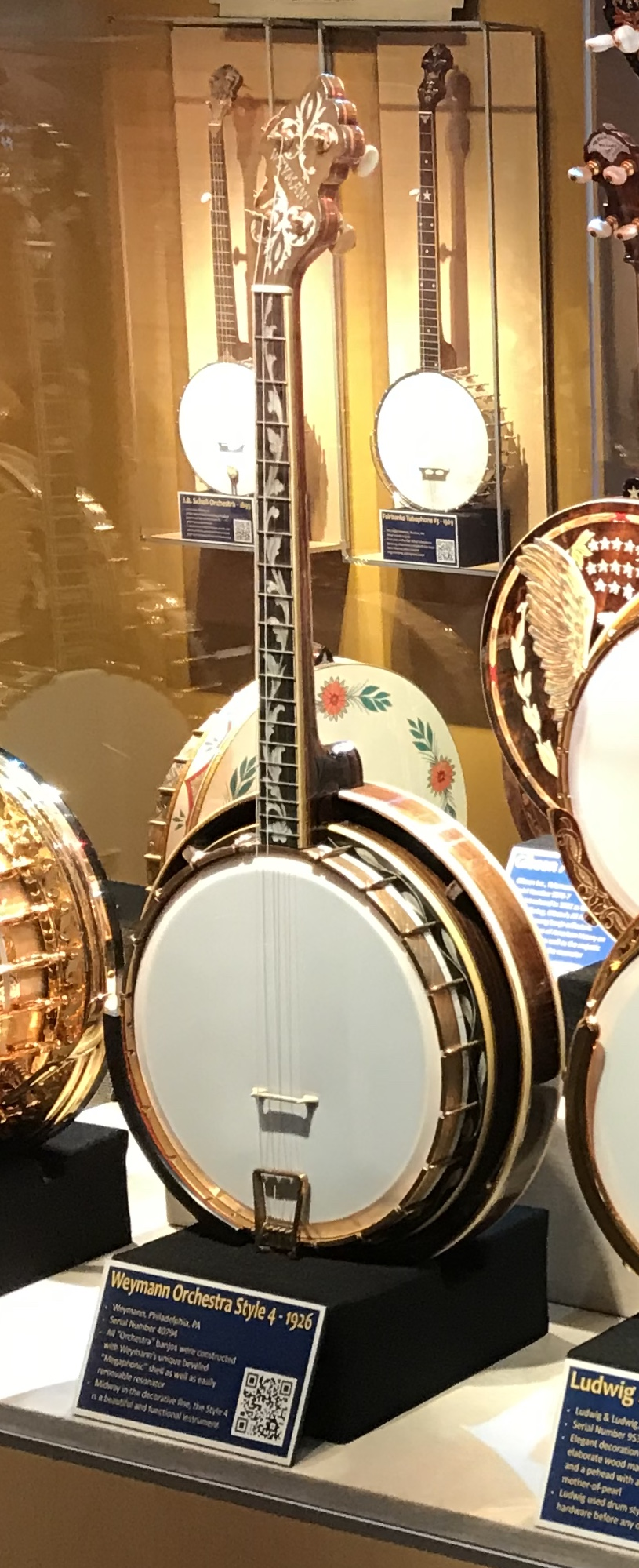
This Weymann Orchestra Style 4 banjo (1926), is displayed at the American Banjo Museum as an example of highly decorated Jazz Age banjos.

When H.A. Weymann died in 1892, his son, Harry William Weymann, took over the business. Harry was motivated and determined to build a music company, opposed to the then current, retail business. Harry set forth a plan to manufacture and wholesale his own musical instrument line and in 1894, the first evidence of Weymann's manufacturing appeared in the S.S. Stewarts Banjo & Guitar Journal. According to an article in the Fretboard Journal, there is evidence of Weymann's employing a talented luthier named Carl C. Holzapfel who had arrived from Germany.

In 1899, the Philadelphia S.S. Stewart Banjo factory closed following the death of the company's founder. Harry Weymann purchased a selection of materials and equipment from the factory and hired ex-Stewart workers to further develop his manufacturing business.

From late 1899 onward, H. A. Weymann began to receive significant media coverage in the Music Trade Review, along with local news press such as the Philadelphia Inquirer. From 1900 onward, Banjo production would become a large portion of manufacturing. Noteworthy, Weymann banjos from the late 1890s and early 1900s have unique traits also found in S.S. Stewart instruments.

== Jerry Garcia ==
Jerry Garcia was the guitarist and frontman for the band Grateful Dead who began his career playing a mid-grade Weymann banjo. To acquire the instrument, Jerry and his wife used their recent wedding cash and sold all of Jerry's previous instruments to afford the banjo. Jerry and his wife nicknamed the banjo "John" as the instrument had been previously inlaid with the name "John" in its Peghead. Jerry Garcia welcomed this unique oddity, as his middle name was also "John". Jerry played "John" up into the 60's where it was replaced with a high-end gold-plated Weymann.

== Weymann Museum ==
In 2017, Weymann announced their plans to develop a private museum, dedicated to the preservation of Weymann estate & factory content. The Weymann collection of instruments and antiquities, span several centuries.

== Patents ==
- Mandolute: H. W. WEYMANN. APPLICATION FILED JULY 27, 1912. 43,684. Patented Mar 4, 1913.
- Stringed Musical Instrument: H. W. WEYMANN. APPLICATION FILED APR. 14, 1916. 1,215,598. Patented Feb. 13, 1917.
- Banjo Attachment: H. W. WEYMANN. APPLICATION FILED JUL 25. 1916. 1,312,882. Patented Aug. 12, 1919.
- Banjo: USPTO Patent: 1,442,756 (expired)
- Armrest & String Protector: USPTO Patent: 1,520,492 (expired)
- Tuning Peg for Musical Instrument: USPTO Patent: 1,544,722 (expired)
- Tailpiece for Stringed Musical Instrument: USPTO Patent: 1,615,514
