= Bellerofonte Castaldi =

Italian composer (1580–1649)

Bellerofonte Castaldi (1580 – 27 September 1649) was an Italian composer, poet and lutenist.

Castaldi was born in Collegara, near Modena. He wrote male parts in his songs for tenors, as he was opposed to the practice of castrati or male falsettists singing male parts in cantatas. In the preface to his collection, Primo mazzetto he writes that it is "laughable that a man with the voice of a woman should set about proposing to his mistress".

He died in Modena in 1649.

== Works, editions and recordings ==
- Primo mazzetto di fiori musicalmente colti dal giardino bellerofonteo - monodies, duets, and trios, with basso continuo (Venice, 1623).

Editions

- Capricci a 2 stromenti cioè tiorba e tiorbino e per sonar solo varie sorti di balli e fantasticarie (1622). Edited by David Dolata, as Capricci (1622), 2 vols. Recent Research in the Music of the Baroque Era 142 & 143. Part 1: Duos for Theorbo and Tiorbino; Sonatas for Theorbo. Part 2: Dances and Other Works for Theorbo; Songs with Tablature Accompaniment. Middleton, Wisc.: A-R Editions, 2006. ISBN 978-0-89579-591-5 (vol. 1), ISBN 978-0-89579-592-2 (vol. 2)

Recordings

- Battaglia d'amore. Castaldi's settings of his own poetry. CD. Gian Paolo Fagotto (tenor). David Dolata, lute. Victor Coelho, lute. Neil Cockburn, harpsichord. Il-Furioso. Toccata Classics
