= Charles Hurel =

French composer

Charles Hurel was a French Baroque composer, lutenist and theorbist active between 1665 and 1692.

== Biography ==
Charles Hurel was a musician and eminent professor from a prosperous family of Parisian luthiers which included some of the main instrumental factors of Paris in the 17th century.

He seems to have been the only member of his family who was also a composer.

He was listed as "ordinary officer of the Academy of Music" in 1684 and as a professor of theorbo in Paris.

A document of 7 April 1676, which gives his signature and that of several other members of his family, describes him as a "lute player".

Among his pupils were Marie Du Port de la Balme and Mademoiselle de Lionne.

He died in Paris c. 1692.

== Namesake ==
Charles Hurel had a namesake, who died in 1648, who was a master painter and sculptor, active among others in the realization of ceilings painted "à la française".

== Works ==
- Tablature de luth et de théorbe (c. 1675 or 1680)
- Theorbo pieces by Charles Hurel, together with lute and theorbo pieces by many other composers can be found in the manuscrit Vaudry de Saizenay (c. 1699) housed at the Bibliothèque municipale de Besançon.

== Discography ==
- Christopher Wilke: Works for Theorbo - Centaur Records CRC 2875

== See also ==
- Lute
- Theorbo
