= Alessandro Piccinini =

Italian composer

Alessandro Piccinini (1566 – 1638) was an Italian lutenist and composer.

Piccinini was born in Bologna into a musical family: his father Leonardo Maria Piccinini taught lute playing to Alessandro as well as his brothers Girolamo (died 1615) and Filippo (died 1648). He held appointments at the Este court in Ferrara (from 1582 to 1597) and with Cardinal Pietro Aldobrandini, papal legate at Bologna and Ferrara. Piccinini died around 1638, probably in Bologna.

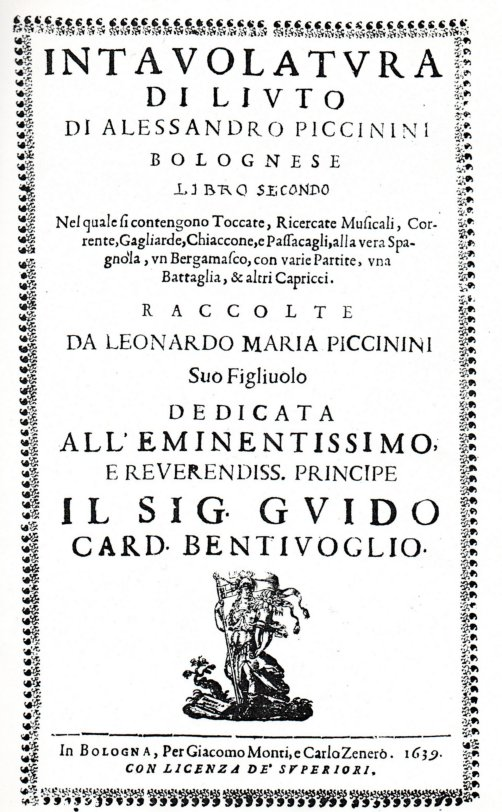
Intavolaturo di Liuto title page, 1639

He is best known for his two volumes of lute music: Intavolatura di Liuto et di Chitarrone, libro primo (Bologna, 1623) and Intavolaturo di Liuto (Bologna, 1639), the latter published posthumously by his son Leonardo Maria Piccinini. The 1623 collection is of particular importance because of Piccinini's lengthy preface, which includes a detailed manual on performance, as well as claims to have invented the archlute (Piccinini also made important modifications to the chitarrone). Piccinini concentrated on toccatas, courantes and galliards, as well as different kinds of variations. No other works by Piccinini are known; his music for La selva sin amor, the first opera performed in Spain, composed by his brother Filippo Piccinini is lost.

== Works ==
- Intavolatura di liuto, et di chitarrone, libro primo, nel quale si contengano dell’uno, & dell’altro stromento arie, baletti, correnti, gagliarde, canzoni, & ricercate musicali, & altre à dui, e trè liuti concertati insieme; et una inscrittione d’avertimenti, che insegna la maniera, & il modo di ben sonare con facilità i sudetti stromenti (Bologna, 1623).
- Intavolatura di liuto, nel quale si contengono toccate, ricercate musicali, corrente, gagliarde, chiaccone, e passacagli alla vera spagnola, un bergamasco, con varie partite, una battaglia, & altri capricci (Bologna, 1639, published posthumously).
