= List of oud makers =

Notable oud makers include:

'

In Morocco:

- Samir Abbassi (Casablanca)
- Khalid Belhaiba (Casablanca)
- abdessalam Chiki (Fès)

In Saudi Arabia: '

- mohammed bin yahya (Jizan)

In Israel:

- Peter sabagh
- Khatem Jubran
- Yaron Naor
- Ibrahim abu romaneh
- Netanel cohen

In Iraq:

- Ahmed al-Abdali
- Farhan Hassan

In Syria:

- Abdo Nahat (Damascus)
- Georges Hayek (Aleppo)
- Michel Khaouam (Aleppo)
- Sumbat DerBedrosian (Damascus)
- Hanna Nahaat
- Ali Khalefa (Syria)
- Amr and Ali (Aleppo)

In Greece:

- Tasos Theodorakis (Thessaloniki)
- Dimitris Rapakousios
- Manolis Kaniadakis (Heraklion-Crete)

In France:

- Sylvain Bouancheau Dugast (Nantes)

In Turkey:

- Faruk Turunz (Istanbul)
- Yıldırım Palabıyık (İzmir)
- Emir Degirmenli (Ankara)

In Lebanon:

- Nazih Ghadban - Ras Baalbek
- Albert Mansour - Beirut
- Fadi Matta - Zouk Mikael
- Georges Bitar
- Rabih Haddad - Zahley
- Yasser AbouChakra - Ammatour El Chouf

In The United States:

- Viken Najarian (California)
- John Vergara (New York)

In The United Kingdom:

- Jo Dusepo

In Australia:

- chahal classical oud
