= Chitarra italiana =

Musical instrument

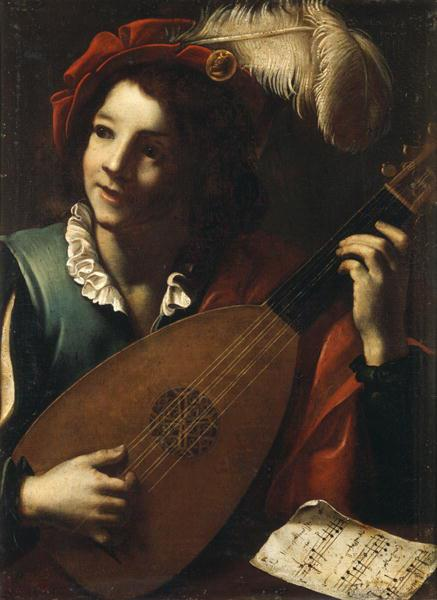
- Classification: Necked bowl lutes; String instruments

Related instruments
- Angélique; Archlute; Barbat (lute); Bağlama; Baglamas; Chitarrone; Dombra; Domra; Dutar; Guitarra morisca; Gittern; Lute; Mandocello; Mandola; Mandolin; Oud; Pandura; Tambouras; Tanbur; Tanbur (Turkish); Tembûr; Theorbo; Tiorbino

The chitarra italiana (Italian: [kiˈtarra itaˈljaːna]; 'Italian guitar') is a lute-shaped plucked instrument with four or five single (sometimes double) strings, in a tuning similar to that of the guitar. It was common in Italy during the Renaissance era.

According to Renato Meucci, the designation 'italiana' followed the introduction to Italy of the flat-backed development of the instrument – referred to in this context as chitarra alla spagnola (literally 'Spanish guitar') – to distinguish between the two versions. It is believed to have descended from panduras, the Mediterranean lutes of antiquity, and to be related to the North African kwitra.

Its bass variety was known as chitarrone. Musicologist Laurence Wright talked about the chitarrone in a letter to the Early Music journal (October 1976), saying it implied "large guitar", that it had a rounded back and was likely to be taken for a smaller lute, and that it was found from the 13th century to the 18th century, but was much rarer in the later centuries. He also said that in later years, when the mandola was popular, the chitarrone was "sometimes confused with the mandola".

== See also ==
- Chitarra battente (Guitar used on southern Italian folk music, also known as Chitarra Italiana)
- Mandore
- Gittern considered ancestral to Spanish guitar and possibly closely related to mandore.
- Kwitra: Also spelled 'kouitra', 'kaitara', and 'quitra'. This is a North African 4-course lute, similar to the oud, and possibly related to the chitarra Italiana. (See articles Andalusian classical music - subsection 'Influence of Andalusian music' and Gittern - subsection 'Etymology').

On "Italian guitar" e and "theorboed Italian guitar" see also: Davide Rebuffa, "La Musica dipinta: ritratti di strumenti musicali. Identificazione degli strumenti a corde pizzicate nei Concerti di Antiveduto", «Il Liuto», Rivista della Società del Liuto, Numero 28, maggio 2024, pp. 2-57.
