= Abd al-Qadir al-Maraghi =

15th-century music theorist and musician

'Abd al-Qadir al-Maraghi
- عبدالقادر غیبی مراغی
- Born: 'Abd al-Qadir al-Maraghi ibn Ghaybi; Maragh, Timurid Empire
- Died: 1435; Herat, Timurid Empire

Abd al-Qadir al-Maraghi ibn Ghaybi (Persian: عبدالقادر مراغی; d. 1435) was a music theorist, composer and performer of the Timurid Empire. A renowned writer on music and musician, his theories had a profound influence on subsequent Persian, Arab, and Turkish music.

== Life ==
Abd al-Qadir al-Maraghi ibn Ghaybi was born Maragh of the Timurid Empire during the mid 14th century, to a Persian family. He had become one of the court minstrels of the Jalayirid Sultan al-Husayn around 1379. Under Sultan Ahmad Jalayirid, he was appointed the chief court minstrel. When Timur captured Baghdad in 1393, he was transported to Samarqand, which was the capital of the Timurid dynasty. In 1399, he was in Tabriz at the service of Timur's wayward son Miran Shah. Abdl al-Qadir was blamed for the erratic conduct of Miranshah, and Timur acted swiftly in order to capture him. But Abd al-Qadir was forewarned and escaped to the Jalayrid court of Sultan Ahmad in Baghdad. Timur again recaptured Baghdad in 1401 and took Abd al-Qadir back to Samarqand. Abd al-Qadir became one of the brilliant men at the court of Timur's son, Shahrukh. In 1421, he also wrote a musical treatise (see below) for the Ottoman Sultan Murad II. He died in Samarqand in 1435.

== Works on music theory ==
Abd al-Qadir was proficient in music, poetry, and painting. This made him be a highly desired artisan amongst the courts of different dynasties. It was due to his musical talent that he was named by his contemporaries as the Glory of the past age.

Abd al-Qadir is known for his four works on music theory. All three surviving works were written in Persian. His most important treatise on music is the Jami al-Alhan (جامع الالحان; 'Compendium of Melodies'), autographs of which are preserved at the Bodleian Library and the Nuruosmaniye Mosque Library in Istanbul. The first manuscript of this work was written in 1405 for his Nur al-din Abd al-Rahman and was revised by the author in 1413. The second manuscript was written in 1415, and carries a dedication to Sultan Sharukh of the Timurid dynasty.

The second major work of Abd al-Qadir is the Persian book Maqasid al-Alhan (Arabic for Purports of Music) (مقاصد الالحان). It was dedicated to the Ottoman Sultan Murad II.

A third treatise on music, the Kanz al-Tu.af (Treasury of Music) which contained the author's notated compositions, has not survived.

His last work, the Sharh al-Adwar (Commentary on the [Kitab al-Adwar] of Safi al-Din al-Urmawi) (شرح الادوار), is to be found in the Nuruosmaniye Mosque Library in Istanbul.

== Linguistic significance ==
Al-Maraghi not only wrote songs in the Persian Language, but also in Arabic, Mongolian, Turkish (Khatai, Chagatay) as well as various regional Iranian dialects (Fahlaviyyat) of Hamadan, Mazandaran, Qazvin, Tabriz, and Rayy. Thus his work gives us a better view of the regional dialects of Iran.

Four quatrains titled fahlaviyyat from Khwaja Muhammad Kojjani (d. 677/1278-79); born in Kojjan or Korjan, a village near Tabriz, recorded by Abd al-Qadir al-Maraghi. A sample of one of the four quatrains from Khwaja Muhammad Kojjani

همه کیژی نَهَند خُشتی بَخُشتی

بَنا اج چو کَه دستِ گیژی وَنیژه

همه پیغمبران خُو بی و چو کِی

محمدمصطفی کیژی وَنیژه

.

Two qet'as (poems) quoted by Abd al-Qadir Maraghi in the dialect of Tabriz (d. 838/1434-35; II, p. 142). A sample of one of these poems

رُورُم پَری بجولان

نو کُو بَمَن وُرارده

وی خَد شدیم بدامش

هیزا اَوُو وُرارده

Six Centuries, Six Years is a film made by a prominent filmmaker, Mojtaba Mirtahmasb which depicts a group of Iranian master musicians' efforts to identify, preserve, and record a collection of compositions by Abd al-Qadir Maraghi. The film won several awards including the Best Documentary Film from 12th Action On Film (AOF) International Film Festival, L.A., USA, in 2016 and Best Documentary Film from 6th London Iranian Film Festival, UK, in 2015.

== Legacy ==
According to the Encyclopedia of Islam, he "was the greatest of the Persian writers on music". According to Kubilay Kolukırık, al-Maraghi is regarded as a "very important musician whose name is frequently mentioned in the development process of Turkic music history".

== Writings ==
- al-Maraghi, 'Abd al-Qadir ibn Ghaybi (1987) [15th century]. Jāmi' al-alḥān جامع الالحان [Compendium of Melodies] (in Persian). Translated by Binish, Taqi. Tehran: Mu'assasa-i Mutala'at wa-Tahqiqat-i Farhangi. OCLC 476977631.
  - —— (1993) [15th century]. Jāmi' al-alḥān: Khātimah جامع الالحان [Compendium of Melodies: Epilogue] (in Persian). Translated by Binish, Taqi. Tehran: Mu'assasa-i Mutala'at wa-Tahqiqat-i Farhangi. OCLC 30849994.
- —— (1966) [15th century]. Maqāṣid al-alḥān مقاصد الالحان [Purports of Melodies] (in Persian). Translated by Binish, Taqi. Tehran: Bungah-i tarjamah va nashr-i kitab. OCLC 977163315. 2nd ed, 1977
- —— (1991) [15th century]. Sharḥ-i adwār: ba matn-i Adwar wa-zawa'id al-fawa'id شرح ادوار : با متن ادوار و زوائد الفوائد [Commentary on (al-Urmawi's Kitāb al-adwār] (in Persian). Translated by Binish, Taqi. Tehran: Markaz-i Nashr-i Danishgahi. OCLC 27455937.

== External References ==
- A kâr (second movement), attributed to 15th century composer Abd-al Qadir Maraghi
- Abd al-Qadir Maraghi - عبدالقادر مراغه‌ایs
- Anwar, on the footsteps of Maraghi (Ensemble Maraghi and Sepideh Raissadat)
