= Archlute =

Musical instrument

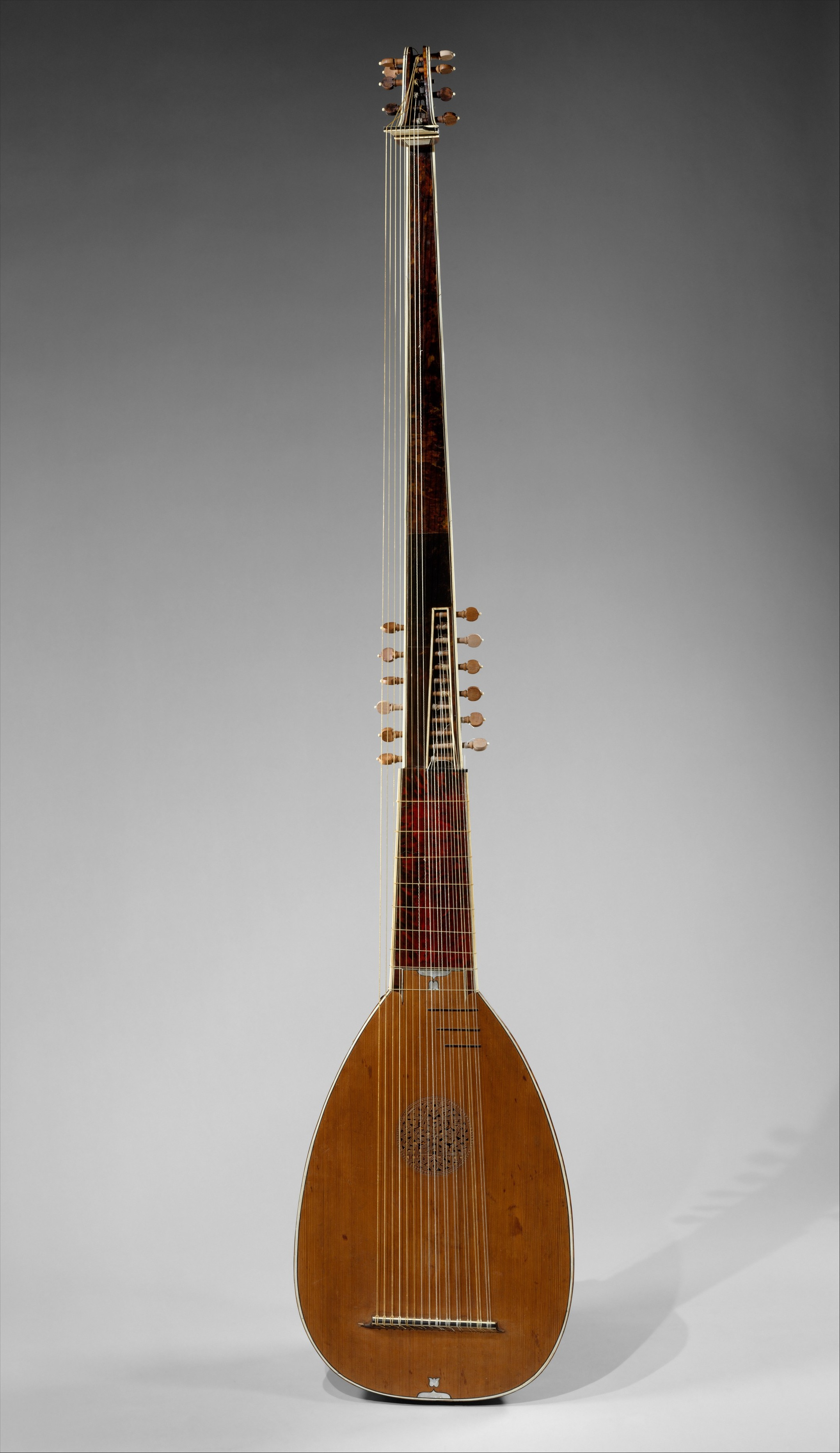
- Archlute by David Tecchler, c. 1725
- Classification: Necked bowl lutes; String instruments

Related instruments
- List: Angélique (instrument); Archlute; Barbat (lute); Biwa; Chitarra Italiana; Lute; Mandola; Mandolin; Oud; Pandura; Pipa; Tambouras; Tanbur; Tanbur (Turkish); Tembûr; Theorbo; Tiorbino

The archlute (Spanish: archilaúd, Italian: arciliuto, German: Erzlaute) is a European plucked string instrument developed around 1600 as a compromise between the very large theorbo, the size and re-entrant tuning of which made for difficulties in the performance of solo music, and the Renaissance tenor lute, which lacked the bass range of the theorbo. Essentially a tenor lute with the theorbo's neck-extension, the archlute lacks the power in the tenor and the bass that the theorbo's large body and typically greater string length provide.

== Overview ==
The main differences between the archlute and the "baroque" lute of northern Europe are that the baroque lute has 11 to 13 courses, while the archlute typically has 14, and the tuning of the first six courses of the baroque lute outlines a d-minor chord, while the archlute preserves the tuning of the Renaissance lute, with perfect fourths surrounding a third in the middle for the first six. The archlute was often used as a solo instrument for the first three-quarters of the 17th century, but is rarely mentioned as a continuo instrument in this period, the theorbo being the lute class instrument with this role.

As continuo bass lines were composed both faster in motion and higher in tessitura toward the end of the 17th century, the archlute began to eclipse the theorbo as the main plucked string continuo instrument. The theorbo lacked the higher notes of the bass lines and the increasing practise of doubling the continuo part with a bowed bass (cello or viol) made the archlute's lack of power in the tenor and bass a less important shortcoming.

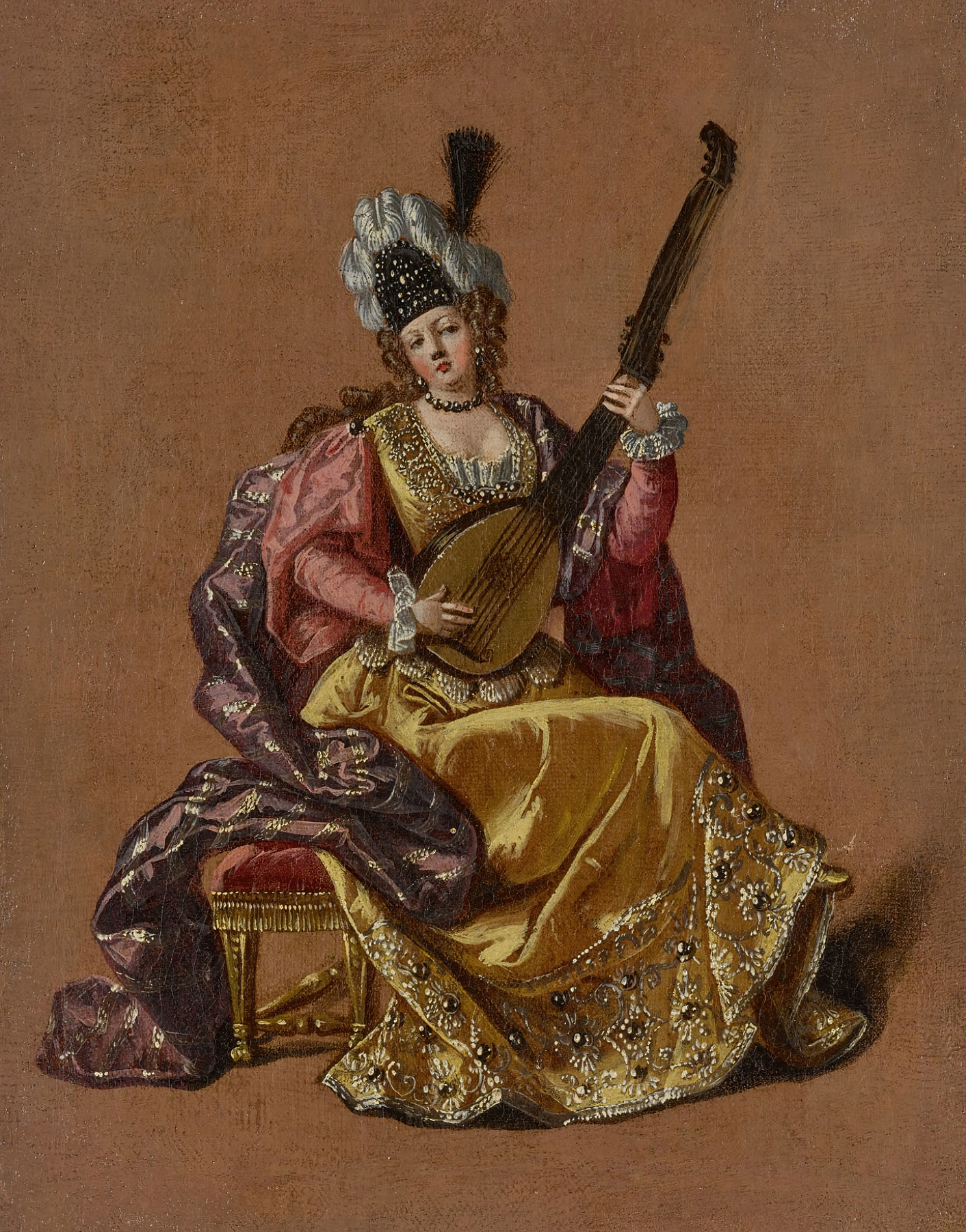
Painting of a lady playing an archlute, Jean Baptiste Vanmour

The theorbo had been commonly used as the melodic bass instrument in trio sonatas from the beginning of the Baroque and the archlute took over that function too, with the most famous example being Corelli's Opus 1 and 3 trio sonatas which have partbooks for 1st and 2nd violin, 'violone o arciliuto' and a continuo part for organ, a simplified version of the 'violone o arciliuto' book. The violone o arciliuto book has just as many figures to tell the player what chords to play as the organ partbook, which suggests the archlute player would be adding chords above the bass where possible.

The archlute was used in Handel's operas and like repertoire; Giulio Cesare (1724) has continuo parts labelled both arciliuto and tiorba. Perhaps one player would play both instruments.

Music for solo archlute is usually notated in tablature.

== Composers ==
Any late Italian Baroque music with a part labelled 'liuto' will mean 'arciliuto', the classic Renaissance lute being in disuse by this time. Among the most important composers of archlute music in the 17th century we can name Alessandro Piccinini, Giovanni Girolamo Kapsperger (c. 1580 – 17 January 1651) and in the 18th century Giovanni Zamboni, whose set of 12 sonatas (1718, Lucca) for the instrument is extant, and Antonio Scotti and Melchiorre Chiesa, Milanese composers from late 18th century. Other known composers of archlute music were Antonio Tinazzoli, Giuseppe Vaccari and Lodovico Fontanelli. Modern composers for archlute include Roman Turovsky and Konstantin Bozhinov.

== Performers ==
Some living players are Edin Karamazov, Axel Wolf, Luca Pianca (the founder of Il Giardino Armonico), and Javier Mas who predominantly play archlutes, and Paolo Cherici, Massimo Lonardi, Luciano Contini, Paul O'Dette, Jakob Lindberg, David Tayler and Nigel North, who use archlutes extensively.

== See also ==
- Lute § History and evolution of the lute
