= Angélique (instrument) =

Plucked string instrument

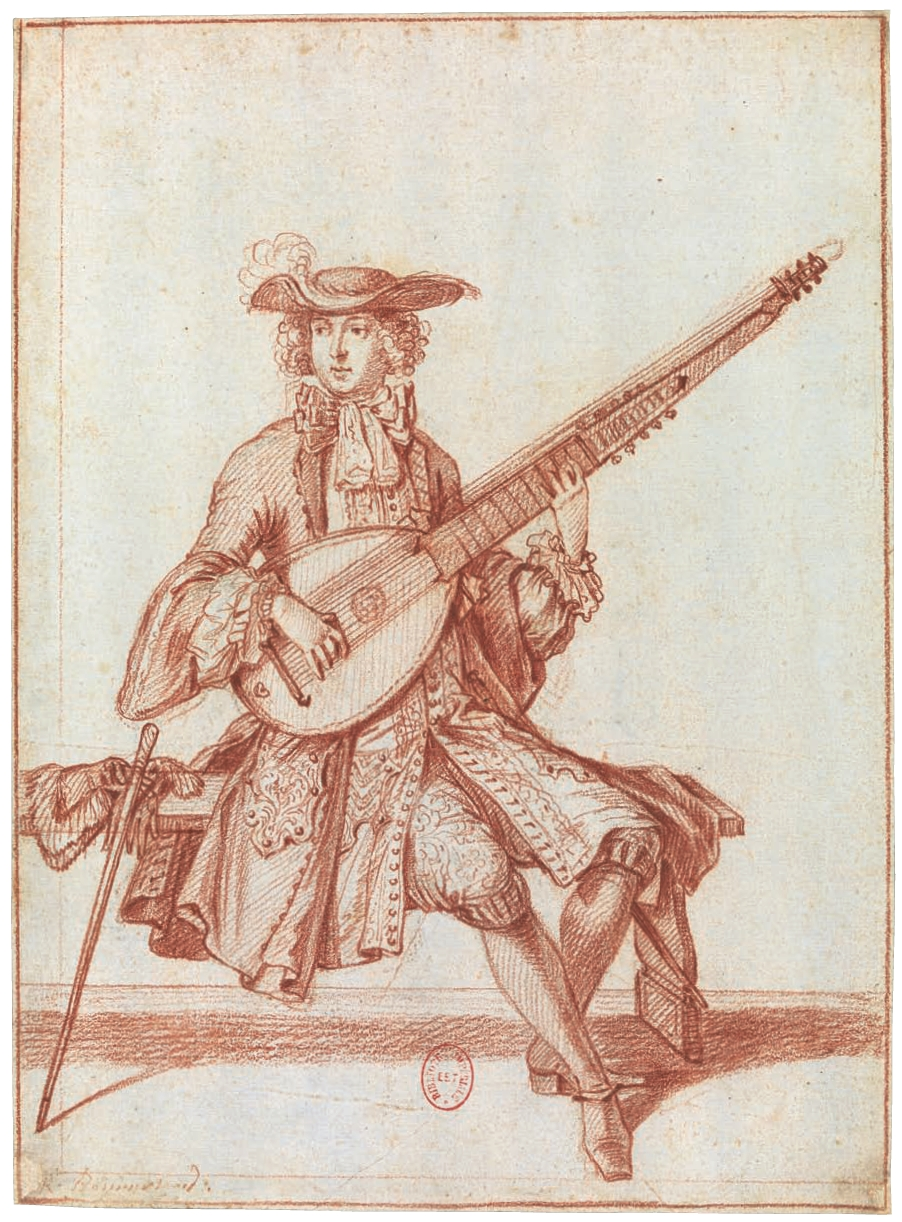
- Angélique (Bonnard-Robert)

String instrument
- Classification: String instrument Plucked string instrument
- Hornbostel–Sachs classification: 321.321 (Composite chordophone sounded with bare hands and fingers)
- Developed: Around 17th century

Related instruments
- Archlute; Barbat (lute); Bouzouki; Charango; Chitarra Italiana; Lute; Mandola; Mandolin; Oud; Pandura; Pipa; Theorbo; Tiorbino; Torban

The angélique (French, also known by its Italian name angelica, its German name angelika, and sometimes in English as the angel lute) is a plucked string instrument of the lute family of the baroque era. A two-headed lute, it contains ten single strings on the lower head and six or seven single strings on the upper head. The existence of ten pegs on the lower peg box is one of the key distinguishing features of this instrument from other lutes.

It combines features of the lute, the harp, and the theorbo.

Like the lute, it has a pear-shaped body and vibrating string lengths ranging from 54 to 70 cm. Differing from the lute, the 16 or 17 string angelica was single-strung like a theorbo, with which it shares its extended neck with a second peg box, bearing six bass strings.

== Overview ==
The angélique was tuned diatonically, like a harp: C – E – F – G – A – B – c – d – e – f – g – a – b – c' – d' – e'. That range is the same as that of the French or lesser theorbo, but the latter differs in that its tuning is reentrant: C – D – E – F – G – A – B – c – d – g – c' – e'– a – d'. The diatonic tuning limited its range, but produced a full and clear tone by the increased use of open strings.

The origins of the angélique are unclear. A similarly tuned instrument was described by Michael Praetorius in the Theatrum instrumentorum section of his Syntagma Musicum. However, his sketch of the instrument showed a different construction with 23 strings running between a sloping bridge and a single pegbox. Many references to the instrument appear in the late 17th century and the 18th century. The English writer on music James Talbot (1664-1708) gave a detailed description of the tuning of the angel lute in one his writing from c. 1695 held in the Christ Church Library.

In France, Jérôme Vignon claimed to be the inventor of the angélique. Grove Music Online neither confirms or denies the claim, but states that Vignon was performing as early as 1661 in Paris in concerts featuring a consort of five angéliques which were witnessed and written about by Christiaan Huygens.

Little surviving music for the angelica as well as few surviving instruments indicate that the angelica flourished during the second half of the 17th and the beginning of the 18th centuries.

Some sources suggest an English origin for the angélique, but this appears to be a misinterpretation of the instrument’s name. (M. H. Fuhrmann, Musicalischer Trichter, Frankfurt/Spree 1706, p. 91). James Talbot correctly interpreted angelica as "angel lute" because of its lovely sound (ms. Oxford 532, 1685–1701). Organologist Emil Vogl suggested the instrument may have been named after the French musician Angélique Paulet.

Music for the angelica is notated in French tablature, with the designation of bass courses varying according to respective authors. The Ukrainian Torban is a descendant of the Angélique.

== Bibliography ==
- Jakob Kremberg, Musicalische Gemüths-Ergoetzung oder Arien ... (Dresden: 1689), in Tabulature
- Adalbert Quadt (Hg.), Gitarrenmusik des 16-18. Jahrhunderts 2, nach Tabulaturen für Colascione, Mandora und Angelica, (Leipzig: 1971)
- Hans Radtke (Hg.), Ausgewählte Stücke aus einer Angelica- und Gitarrentabulatur, Musik Alter Meister Heft 17, (Graz: 1967)
- Praetorius, Theatrum instrumentorum
- L. Brugmans, Le séjour de Christian Huygens à Paris (Paris,1935), 151
- F. Lesure: 'The angélique in 1653', GSJ, vi (1953), 111–12
- F. Lesure: 'Les luthistes parisiens à l'époque de Louis XIII', Le luth et sa musique (Neuilly-sur-Seine, 1957), 222–3
- M. Prynne: 'James Talbot's Manuscript: IV: Plucked Strings – the Lute Family', GSJ, xiv (1961), 52–68
- E. Pohlmann, Laute, Theorbe, Chitarrone: die Instrumente, ihre Musik und Literatur von 1500 bis zur Gegenwart (Bremen, 1968, 5/1982), 394–7
- E. Vogl: 'Die Angelika und ihre Musik', HV, xi (1974), 356–71
- G. Hellwig, Joachim Tielke: ein Hamburger Lauten- und Violenmacher der Barockzeit (Frankfurt, 1980), 304–5
- F. und B. Hellwig, Joachim Tielke. Kunstvolle Musikinstrumente des Barock (Berlin/München, 2011), 108–111, 123-8
- C. Meyer and M. Rollin, Oeuvres de Gumprecht (Paris, 1993), xvii
