= Oud =

Pear-shaped stringed musical instrument

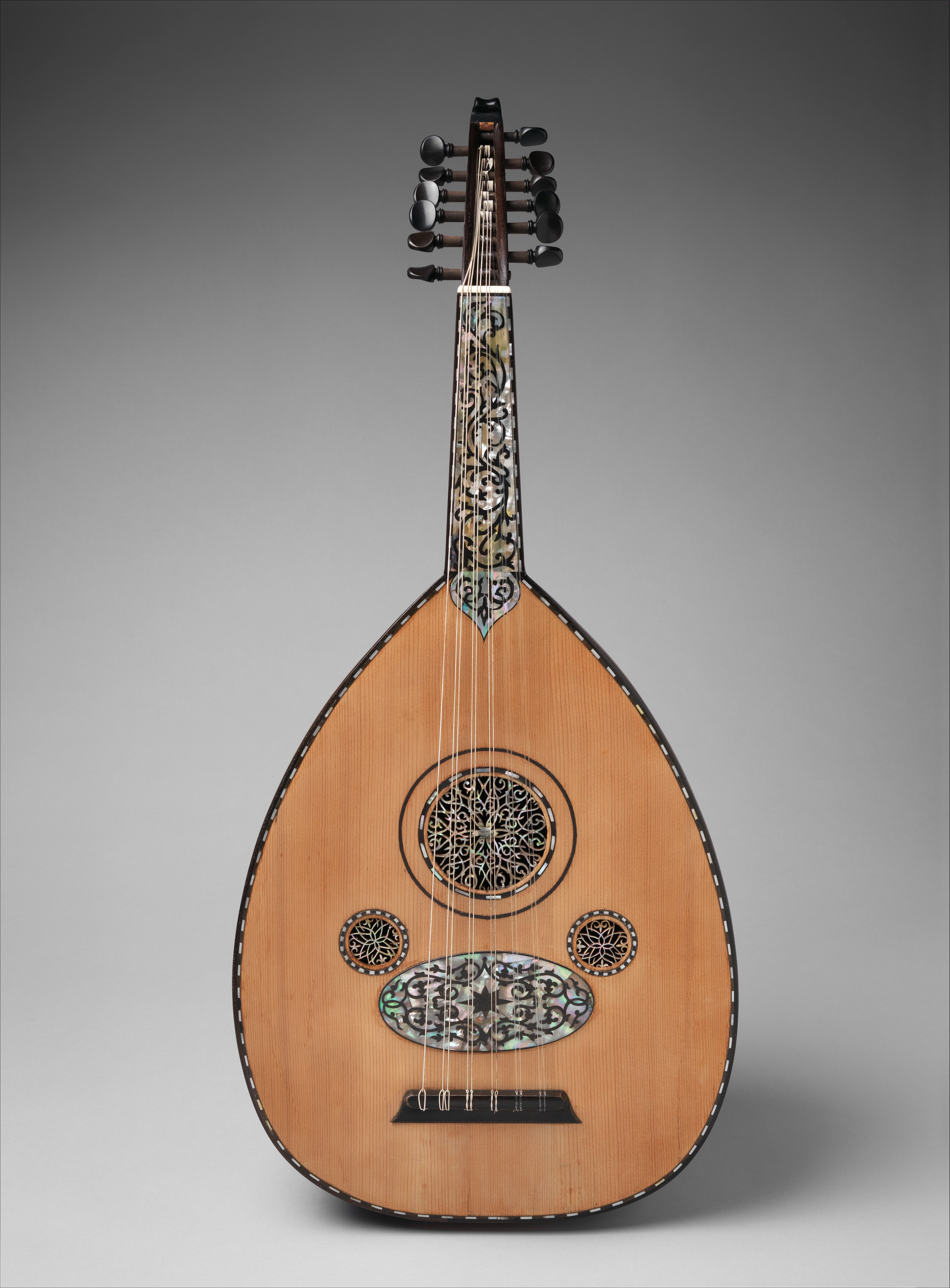
- Oud crafted by Emmanuel Venious in 1916

String instrument
- Classification: String instruments; Necked bowl lutes
- Hornbostel–Sachs classification: 321.321-6 (Composite chordophone sounded with a plectrum)
- Developed: Islamic Golden Age

Related instruments
- List: Angélique; Archlute; Barbat (lute); Baglamadaki; Bağlama; Bipa; Biwa; Bouzouki; Çifteli; Cobza; Cümbüş; Daguangxian; Đàn tỳ bà; Dombra; Domra; Dutar; Kobza; Lavta; Liuqin; Lute; Mandocello; Mandola; Mandolin; Mandolute; Pandura; Pipa; Qanbus; Rud; Šargija; Saz; Setar; Tanbur; Tanbur (Turkish); Tar (Azerbaijani instrument); Tembûr; Theorbo; Torban

Sound sample
- Hob Eh Introduction of Egyptian Arabic: حب إيه, romanized: Hob Eh, composed by renowned Egyptian composer and song-writer Baligh Hamdi

Crafting and playing the Oud
- UNESCO Intangible Cultural Heritage
- Country: Iran and Syria
- Reference: 01867

Inscription history
- Inscription: 2022 (17th session)
- List: Representative

The oud (/uːd/ OOD; Arabic: عُود, romanized: ʿūd, pronounced [ʕuːd]) is a Middle Eastern short-neck lute-type, pear-shaped, fretless stringed instrument (a chordophone in the Hornbostel–Sachs classification of instruments), usually with 11 strings grouped in six courses, but some models have five or seven courses, with 10 or 13 strings respectively.

The oud is similar to other types of lute, and to Western lutes which developed out of the Medieval Islamic oud. Similar instruments have been used in the Middle East, some predating Islam, such as the barbat from Persia. Different versions of the oud are used in Arabia, Turkey, and other Middle Eastern and Balkan regions. The oud, as a fundamental difference with the western lute, has no frets and a smaller neck. It is the direct successor of the Persian barbat lute. The oldest surviving oud is thought to be in Brussels, at the Museum of Musical Instruments.

An early description of the "modern" oud was given by 11th-century musician, singer and author Al-Hasan Ibn al-Haytham (c. 965–1040) in his compendium on music Ḥāwī al-Funūn wa Salwat al-Maḥzūn. The first known complete description of the ‛ūd and its construction is found in the epistle Risāla fī-l-Luḥūn wa-n-Nagham by 9th-century philosopher of the Arabs Yaʻqūb ibn Isḥāq al-Kindī. Kindī's description stands thus:

[and the] length [of the ‛ūd] will be: thirty-six joint fingers—with good thick fingers—and the total will amount to three ashbār. (Note: The shibr (singular of ashbār) is a measurement unit which equals roughly 18-24 cm, depending on the hand. It equates to the measured length between the tip of the thumb and the tip of the auricular finger when stretched flat and in opposite directions. The shibr otherwise measures 12 fingers (36:3): a "full" finger should be about 2 cm in width.) And its width: fifteen fingers. And its depth seven and a half fingers. And the measurement of the width of the bridge with the remainder behind: six fingers. Remains the length of the strings: thirty fingers and on these strings take place the division and the partition, because it is the sounding [or "the speaking"] length. This is why the width must be [of] fifteen fingers as it is the half of this length. Similarly for the depth, seven fingers and a half and this is the half of the width and the quarter of the length [of the strings]. And the neck must be one third of the length [of the speaking strings] and it is: ten fingers. Remains the vibrating body: twenty fingers. And that the back (soundbox) be well rounded and its "thinning" (kharţ) [must be done] towards the neck, as if it had been a round body drawn with a compass which was cut in two in order to extract two ‛ūds.

In Pre-Islamic Persia, Arabia and Mesopotamia, the stringed instruments had only three strings, with a small musical box and a long neck without any tuning pegs. But during the Islamic era the musical box was enlarged, a fourth string was added, and the base for the tuning pegs (Bunjuk) or pegbox was added. In the first centuries of (pre-Islamic) Arabian civilisation, the stringed instruments had four courses (one string per course—double-strings came later), tuned in successive fourths. Curt Sachs said they were called (from lowest to highest pitch) bamm, maṭlaṭ, maṭnā and zīr. "As early as the ninth century" a fifth string ḥād ("sharp") was sometimes added "to make the range of two octaves complete". It was highest in pitch, placed lowest in its positioning in relation to other strings. Modern tuning preserves the ancient succession of fourths, with adjunctions (lowest or highest courses), which may be tuned differently following regional or personal preferences. Sachs gives one tuning for this arrangement of five pairs of strings, d, e, a, d', g'.

Historically, oud strings were made of stretched and tightly wound animal gut, whereas modern strings are made with silk, nylon, copper and/or silver bound wire. The instrument is played by plucking stringers with a risha, which means feather in Arabic, that was traditionally made from an eagles feather. Although today, the risha is most commonly made from plastic, and less often from tortoise shell or filed down animal bone.

Historical sources indicate that Ziryab (789–857) added a fifth string to his oud. He was well known for founding a school of music in Andalusia, one of the places where the oud or lute entered Europe. Another mention of the fifth string was made by Al-Hasan Ibn al-Haytham in Ḥāwī al-Funūn wa Salwat al-Maḥzūn.

== Names and etymology ==
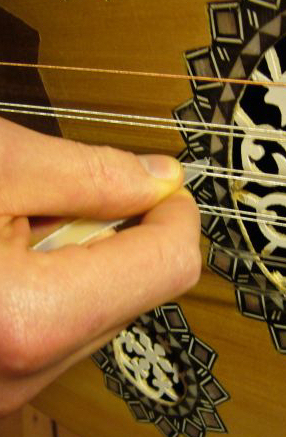
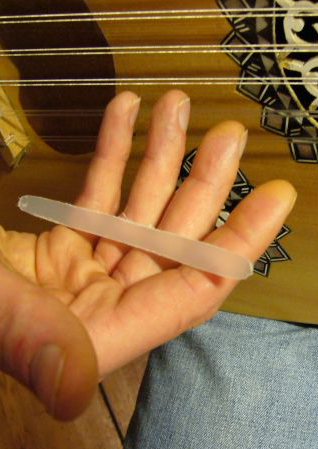
The oud plectrum, called risha in Arabic, mızrap in Turkish and zakhme in Persian

The Arabic: العود (al-ʿūd or oud) literally denotes a thin piece of wood similar to the shape of a straw. It may refer to the wooden plectrum traditionally used for playing the oud, to the thin strips of wood used for the back, or to the wooden soundboard that distinguishes it from similar instruments with skin-faced bodies. Henry George Farmer considers the similitude between al-ʿūd and al-ʿawda ("the return" – of bliss).

Multiple theories have been proposed for the origin of the Arabic name oud. The word oud (عود) means "from wood" and "stick" in Arabic. In 1940 Curt Sachs contradicted or refined that idea, saying oud meant flexible stick, not wood. A western scholar of Islamic musical subjects, Eckhard Neubauer, suggested that oud may be an Arabic borrowing from the Persian word rōd or rūd, which meant string. Another researcher, archaeomusicologist Richard J. Dumbrill, suggests that rud came from the Sanskrit rudrī (रुद्री, meaning "string instrument") and transferred to Arabic (a Semitic language) through a Semitic language. While the authors of these statements about the meanings or origins of the word may have accessed linguistic sources, they were not linguists.

However, another theory according to Semitic language scholars, is that the Arabic ʿoud is derived from Syriac ʿoud-a, meaning "wooden stick" and "burning wood"—cognate to Biblical Hebrew ’ūḏ, referring to a stick used to stir logs in a fire.

Names for the instrument in different languages include Arabic: عود ʿūd or ʿoud (Arabic pronunciation: [ʕu(ː)d, ʢuːd], plural: أعواد aʿwād), Armenian: ուդ, Syriac: ܥܘܕ ūd, Greek: ούτι oúti, Hebrew: עוּד ud, Persian: بربت barbat (although the barbat is a different lute instrument), Turkish: ud or ut, and Azeri: ud

== History ==
=== Musical instruments from pre-history ===
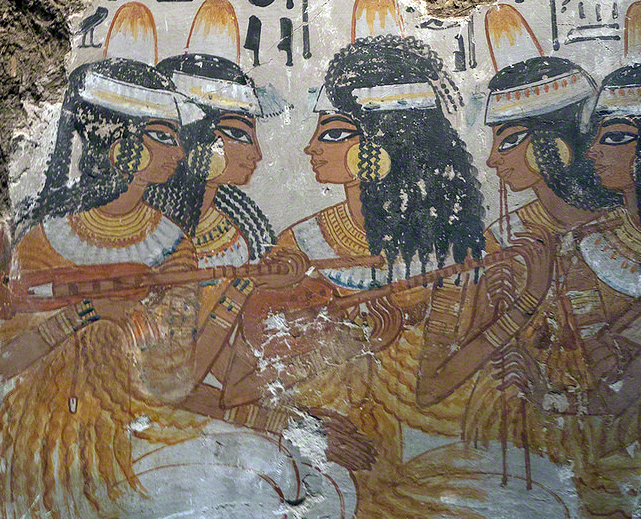
Egyptian lute players with long-necked lutes. Fresco from the tomb of Nebamun, a nobleman in the 18th Dynasty of Ancient Egypt, c. 1350 BC

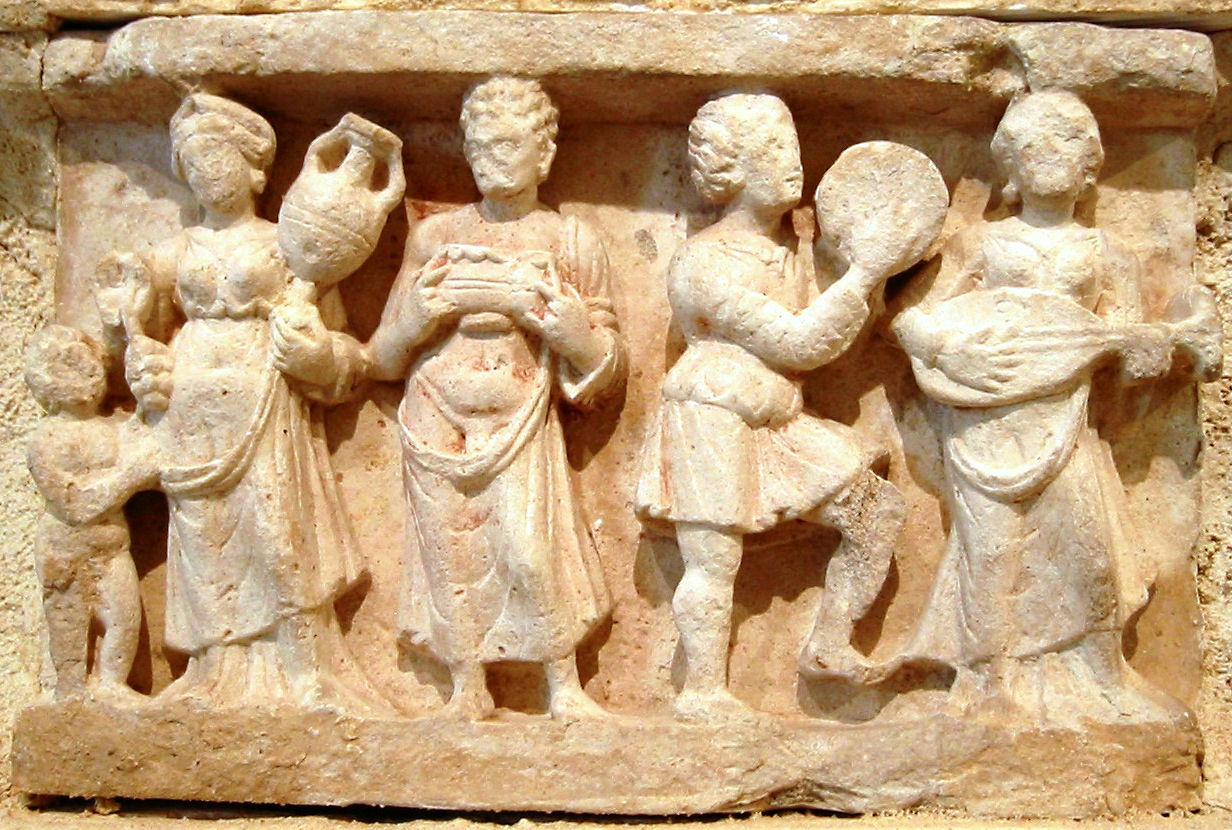
Hellenistic banquet scene from the 1st century AD, Hadda, Gandhara. Short-necked, 2-string lute held by player, far right

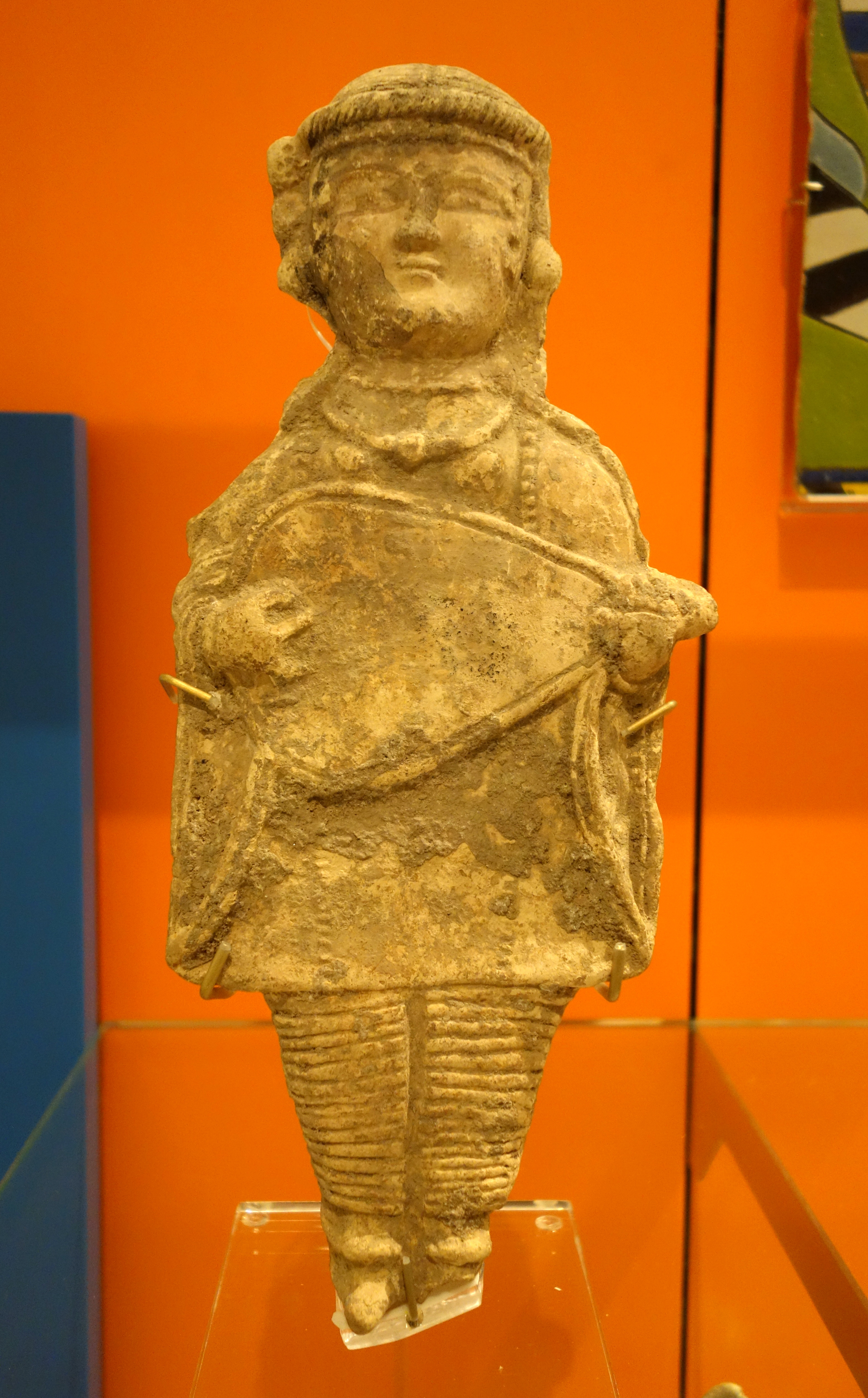
Iran, 11th or 12th century A.D. Earthenware statue of a musician playing a short-necked, lute-style instrument

The entire complete history of the development of the lute family is not fully compiled at this date, only some of it. The highly influential organologist Curt Sachs distinguished between the "long-necked lute" and the short-necked variety. Douglas Alton Smith argues the long-necked variety should not be called lute at all because it existed for at least a millennium before the appearance of the short-necked instrument that eventually evolved into what is now known as the lute.

Musicologist Richard Dumbrill today uses the word more categorically to discuss instruments that existed millennia before the term "lute" was coined. Dumbrill documented more than 3000 years of iconographic evidence for the lutes in Mesopotamia, in his book The Archaeomusicology of the Ancient Near East. According to Dumbrill, the lute family included instruments in Mesopotamia prior to 3000 BC. He points to a cylinder seal as evidence; dating from c. 3100 BC or earlier (now in the possession of the British Museum); the seal depicts on one side what is thought to be a woman playing a stick "lute". Like Sachs, Dumbrill saw length as distinguishing lutes, dividing the Mesopotamian lutes into a long-necked variety and a short. He focuses on the longer lutes of Mesopotamia, and similar types of related necked chordophones that developed throughout the ancient world: Greek, Egyptian (in the Middle Kingdom), Elamites, Hittite, Roman, Bulgar, Turkic, Indian, Chinese, Armenian/Cilician, Canaanite/Phoenician, Israelite/Judean, and various other cultures. He names among the long lutes, the pandura, the panduri, tambur and tanbur.

The line of short-necked lutes was further developed to the east of Mesopotamia, in Bactria and Gandhara, into a short, almond-shaped lute. Curt Sachs talked about the depictions of Gandharan lutes in art, where they are presented in a mix of "Northwest Indian art" under "strong Greek influences". The short-necked lutes in these Gandhara artworks were "the venerable ancestor of the Islamic, the Sino-Japanese and the European lute families." He described the Gandhara lutes as having a "pear-shaped body tapering towards the short neck, a frontal stringholder, lateral pegs, and either four or five strings." The oldest images of short-necked lutes from the area that Sachs knew of were "Persian figurines of the 8th century B.C.," found in excavations at Suza, but he knew of nothing connecting these to the Oud-related Gandharan art 8 centuries later.

=== Spread of oud to Europe ===
When the Umayyads conquered Hispania in 711, they brought their ud along. An oud is depicted as being played by a seated musician in Qasr Amra of the Umayyad dynasty, one of the earliest depictions of the instrument as played in early Islamic history.

During the 8th and 9th centuries, many musicians and artists from across the Islamic world flocked to al-Andalus. Among them was Abu l-Hasan ‘Ali Ibn Nafi‘ (789–857), a prominent musician who had trained under Ishaq al-Mawsili (d. 850) in Baghdad and was exiled to al-Andalus before 833 AD. He taught and has been credited with adding a fifth string to his oud and with establishing one of the first schools of music in Córdoba.

By the 11th century, Muslim Iberia had become a center for the manufacture of instruments. These goods spread gradually to Provence, influencing French troubadours and trouvères and eventually reaching the rest of Europe. While Europe developed the lute, the oud remained a central part of Arab music, and broader Ottoman music as well, undergoing a range of transformations.

Although the major entry of the short lute was in western Europe, leading to a variety of lute styles, the short lute entered Europe in the East as well; as early as the sixth century, the Bulgars brought the short-necked variety of the instrument called Komuz to the Balkans.

=== Origins theory from religious and philosophical beliefs ===
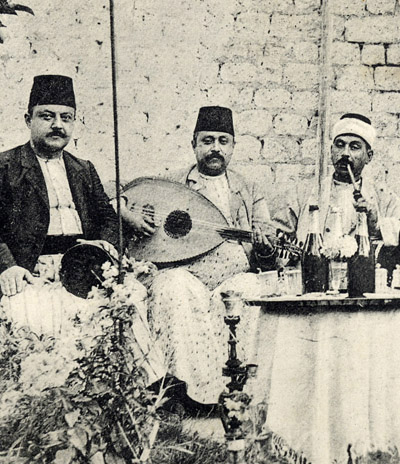
Syrian musicians in Aleppo with an oud, c. 1915

According to Abū Ṭālib al-Mufaḍḍal (a-n-Naḥawī al-Lughawī) ibn Salma (9th century), who himself refers to Hishām ibn al-Kullā, the oud was invented by Lamech, the descendant of Adam and Cain. Another hypothetical attribution says that its inventor was Mani. Ibn a-ṭ-Ṭaḥḥān adds two possible mythical origins: the first involves the Devil, who would have lured the "People of David" into exchanging (at least part of) their instruments with the oud. He writes himself that this version is not credible. The second version attributes, as in many other cultures influenced by Greek philosophy, the invention of the oud to "Philosophers".

==== Central Asia ====
One theory is that the oud originated from the Persian instrument called a barbat (Persian: بربت ) or barbud, a lute indicated by Marcel-Dubois to be of Central Asian origin. The earliest pictorial image of the barbat dates back to the 1st century BC from ancient northern Bactria and is the oldest evidence of the existence of the barbat. Evidence of a form of the barbaṭ is found in a Gandhara sculpture from the 2nd-4th centuries AD which may well have been introduced by the Kushan aristocracy, whose influence is attested in Gandharan art. The name barbat itself meant short-necked lute in Pahlavi, the language of the Sasanian Empire, through which the instrument came west from Central Asia to the Middle East, adopted by the Persians.

The barbat (possibly known as mizhar, kirān, or muwatter, all skin topped versions) was used by some Arabs in the sixth century. At the end of the 6th century, a wood topped version of the Persian-styled instrument was constructed by al Nadr, called "ūd", and introduced from Iraq to Mecca. This Persian-style instrument was being played there in the seventh century. Sometime in the seventh century it was modified or "perfected" by Mansour Zalzal, and the two instruments (barbat and "ūd shabbūt") were used side by side into the 10th century, and possibly longer. The two instruments have been confused by modern scholars looking for examples, and some of the ouds identified may possibly be barbats. Examples of this cited in the Encyclopedia of Islam include a lute in the Cantigas de Santa Maria and the frontispiece from The Life and Times of Ali Ibn Isa by Harold Bowen.

The oldest pictorial record of a short-necked lute-type vīnā dates from around the 1st to 3rd centuries AD. The site of origin of the oud seems to be Central Asia. The ancestor of the oud, the barbat was in use in pre-Islamic Persia. Since the Safavid period, and perhaps because of the name shift from barbat to oud, the instrument gradually lost favor with musicians.

The Turkic peoples had a similar instrument called the kopuz. This instrument was thought to have magical powers and was brought to wars and used in military bands. This is noted in the Göktürk monument inscriptions. The military band was later used by other Turkic state's armies and later by Europeans.

== Types ==
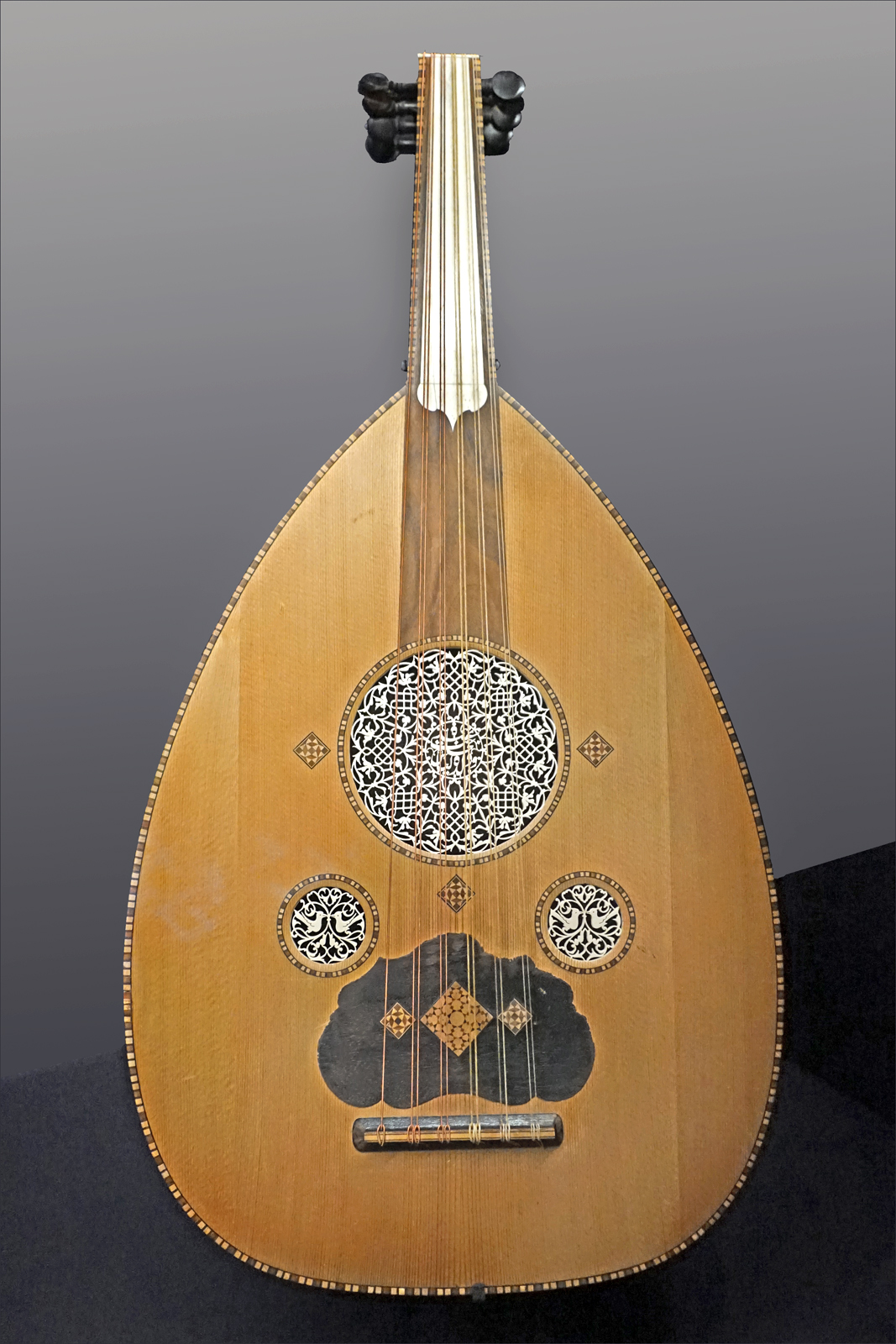
Arabic oud from Egypt

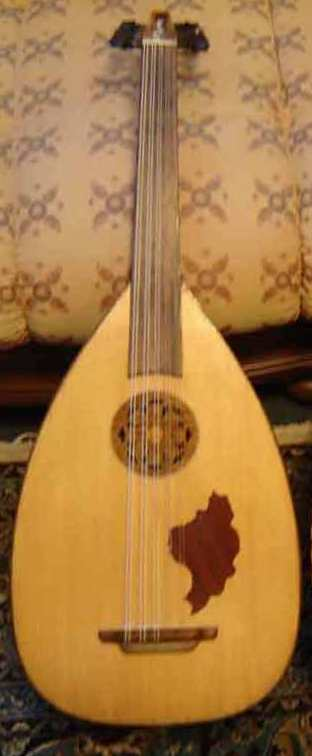
Iranian barbat

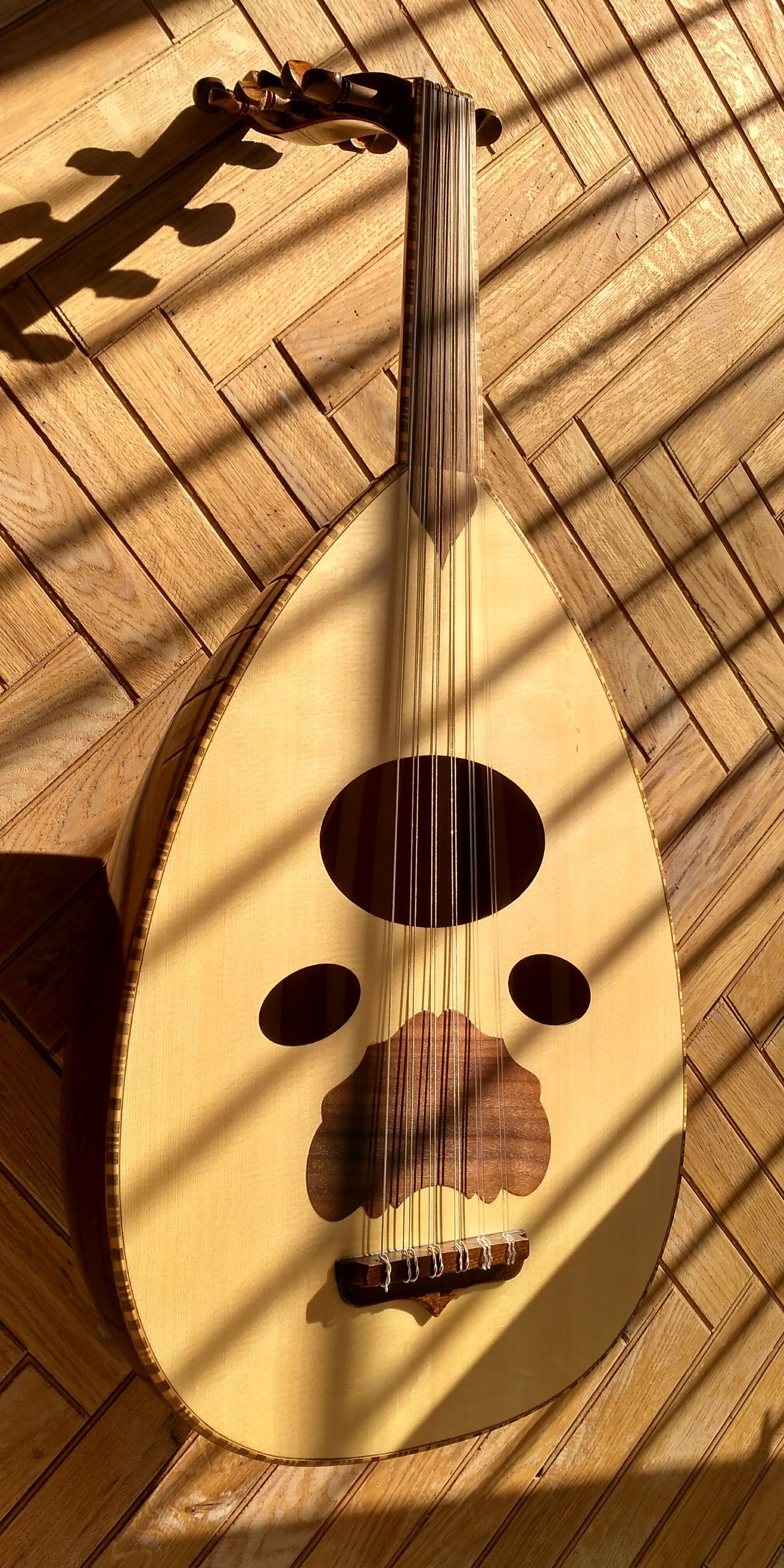
Syrian oud

=== Arabian oud, Turkish oud, and Persian barbat ===
Modern-day ouds fall into three categories: Arabian, Turkish, and Persian, the last also being known as barbat.

This distinction is not based solely on geography; the Arabic oud is found not only in the Arabian Peninsula but throughout the Arab world. Turkish ouds have been played by Anatolian Greeks, where they are called outi, and in other locations in the Mediterranean. The Iraqi oud, Egyptian oud and Syrian oud, are normally grouped under the term 'Arabian oud' because of their similarities, although local differences may occur, notably with the Iraqi oud. However, all these categories are very recent, and do not do justice to the variety of ouds made in the 19th century, and also today.

Arabian ouds are normally larger than their Turkish and Persian counterparts, producing a fuller, deeper sound, whereas the sound of the Turkish oud is more taut and shrill, not least because the Turkish oud is usually (and partly) tuned one whole step higher than the Arabian. Turkish ouds tend to be more lightly constructed than Arabian with an unfinished sound board, lower string action and with string courses placed closer together. Turkish ouds also tend to be higher pitched and have a "brighter timbre". Arabian ouds have a scale length of between 61 cm and 62 cm in comparison to the 58.5 cm scale length for Turkish. There exists also a variety of electro-acoustic and electric ouds.

The modern Persian barbat resembles the oud, although differences include a smaller body, longer neck, a slightly raised fingerboard, and a sound that is distinct from that of the oud.

The cümbüş is a Turkish instrument that started as a hybrid of the oud and the banjo.

=== Tuning ===
The open strings played on an oud tuned in the American pattern "D2 G2 A2 D3 G3 C4"

Different ways of tuning the oud exist within the different oud traditions. Among those playing the oud in the Arabic tradition, a common older pattern of tuning the strings is (low pitch to high): D2 G2 A2 D3 G3 C4 on single string courses or D2, G2 G2, A2 A2, D3 D3, G3 G3, C4 C4 for a course of two strings. In the Turkish tradition, the "Bolahenk" tuning, is common, (low pitch to high): C#2 F#2 B2 E3 A3 D4 on instruments with single string courses or C#2, F#2 F#2, B2 B2, E3 E3, A3 A3, D4 D4 on instruments with courses of two strings. The C2 and F2 are actually tuned 1/4 of a tone higher than a normal c or f in the Bolahenk system.

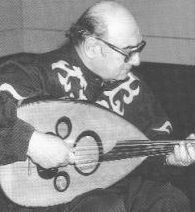
Munir Bashir, a master of the Iraqi school of the Arabic maqam scale system

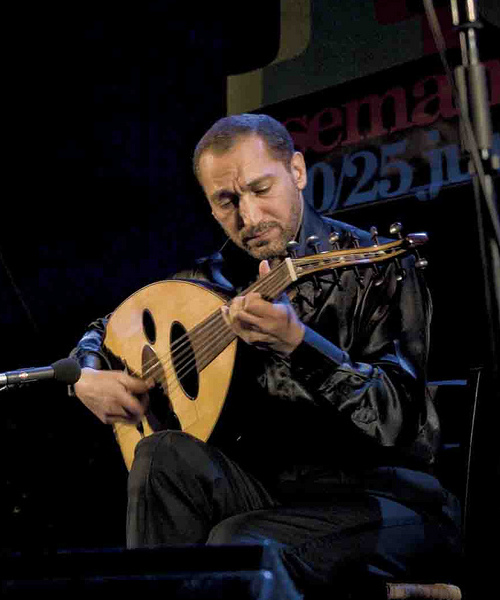
Naseer Shamma, oud virtuso

Many current Arab players use this tuning: C2 F2 A2 D3 G3 C4 on the standard tuning instruments, and some use a higher pitch tuning, F2 A2 D3 G3 C4 F4, known as the Modern Arabic Tuning.

=== Zenne oud ===
The Zenne oud, often translated as a women's oud or female oud is a smaller version of the oud designed for those with smaller hands and fingers. It usually has a scale length of 55–57 cm, instead of the 60–62 cm of the Arabic oud, and the 58.5 cm of the Turkish oud.

=== Oud arbi and oud ramal ===
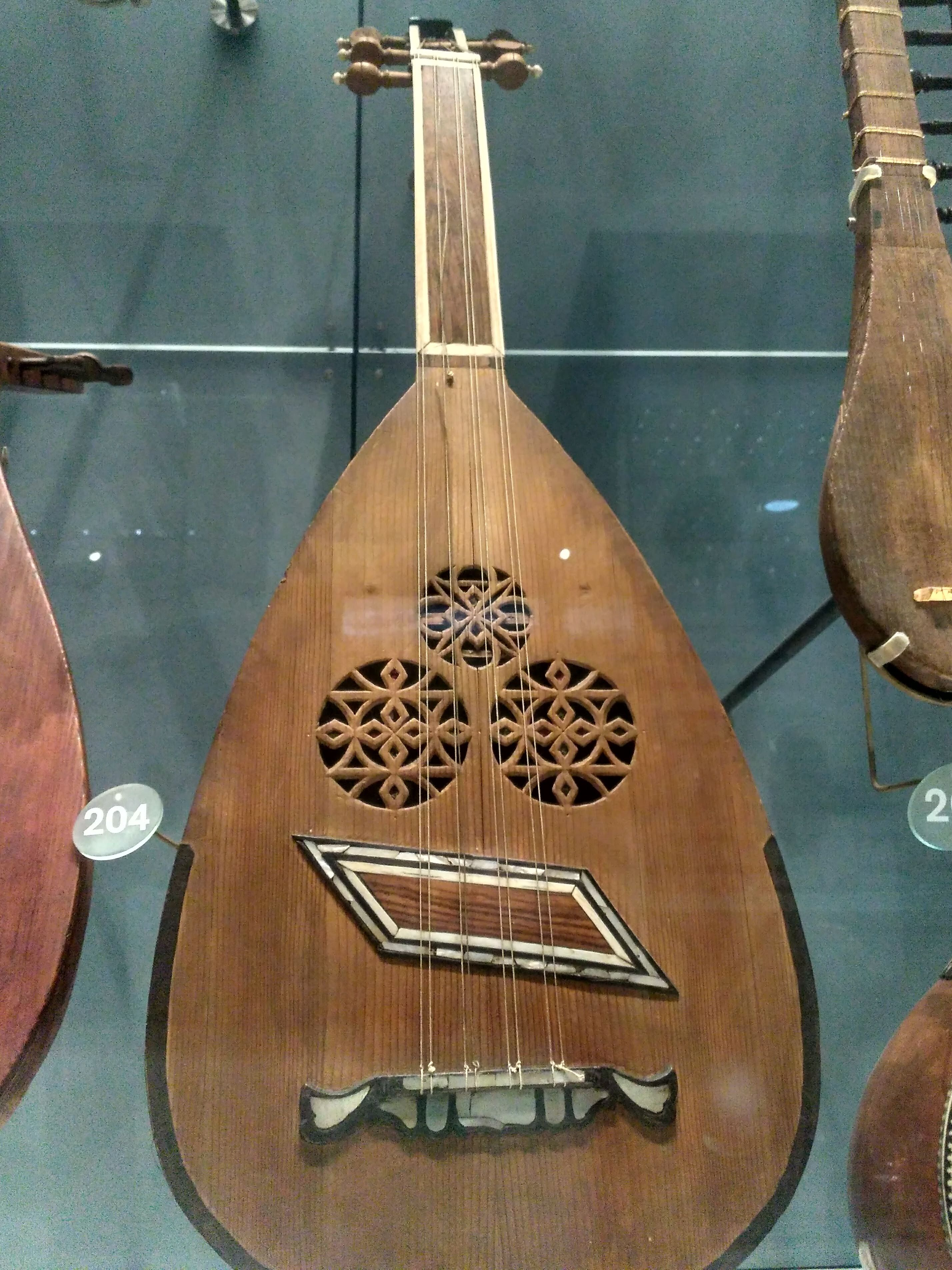
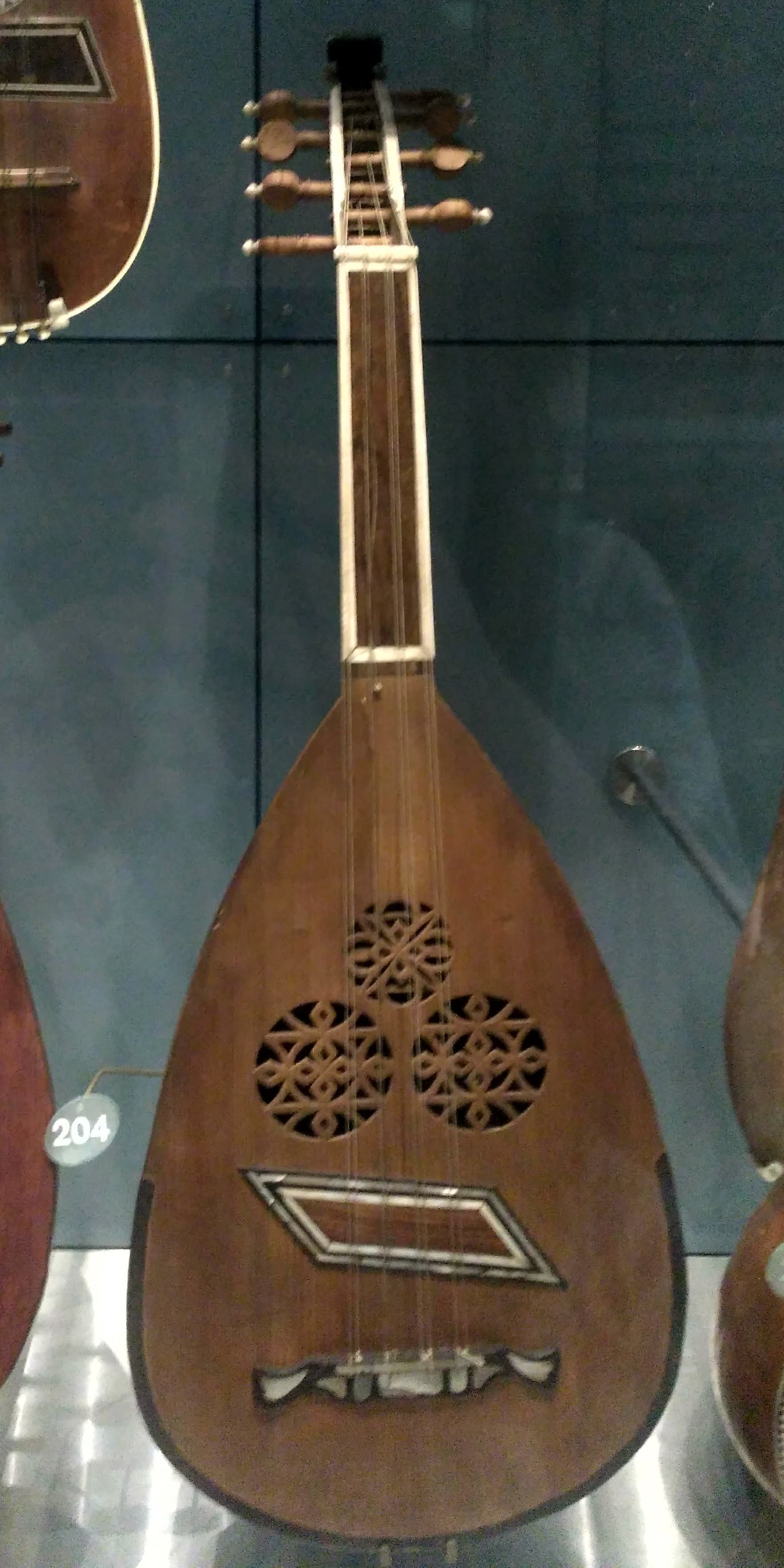
Arabic Oud in the Horniman Museum, London, UK

The oud arbi is a North African variant of the oud with a longer neck and only four courses. It is not to be confused with the differently shaped and tuned kwitra. The oud arbi is tuned in a re-entrant tuning of G3 G3, E4 E4, A3 A3, D4 D4.

=== Oud kumethra ===
The oud kumethra, also known as pregnant oud or pear oud, is an oud with the body in a pear-like shape. This type is relatively uncommon and mostly from Egypt.

== See also ==
- Arabic Oud House
- Arabic music
- Armenian music
- Byzantine music
- Farid al-Atrash – A Syrian-Egyptian (notable) oud player
- Kurdish music
- List of oud makers
- List of oud players
- Music of Palestine
- Middle Eastern and North East African music traditions
- Music of Iraq
- Turkish music
- Zaidoon Treeko
