= Mandolute =

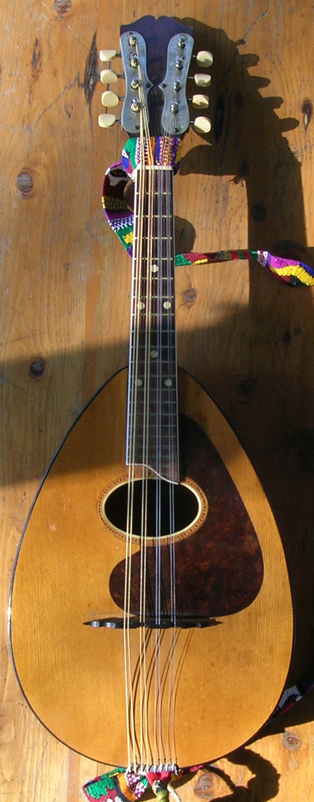
- A Weymann mandolute from the 1920s or 1930s
- Classification: String instrument (plucked)
- Hornbostel–Sachs classification: 321.322 (Composite chordophone)
- Developed: 20th century

Related instruments
- List: Lute; Mandolin

Builders
- Weymann and Son

The Weymann Mandolute was one of the products sold under Weymann, the Philadelphia-based brand of Weymann and Sons, established 1864. The 'mandolutes' were actually mandolins with eight strings and tuned exactly the same. The scale length is also within the standard mandolin scale; between 13 inches (330 mm) and 13 7/8 inches (350 mm). They advertised using scientific principles to create vibrations, power and volume as well as sustained sweet and mellow tones, all in the same instrument.

== History ==
Weymann and Son was a Philadelphia company, manufacturers of Weymann and Keystone State musical instruments. They manufactured the mandolute during the early 20th century. They also had a retail store on 1010 Chestnut Street. They advertised in the Philadelphia papers, with advertisements pushing culture. Young men and women, sitting around in a formal parlor setting, playing music together on Weymann Mandolins, dancing together around a Victrola record player. The Mandolutes sold from $25 to $75 in 1913.

== See also ==
- Weymann guitars
- Mandolin
