= Burris =

Burris may refer to:

== People ==
- Adam Dunlap Burris (1887–1950), Canadian politician from Nova Scotia
- Al Burris (1894–1938), American professional baseball player
- Art Burris (1924–1993), American basketball player
- Benjamin J. Burris (1882–1927), American university president
- Billy Burris (born 1981), American judge from Louisiana
- Bo Burris (born 1944), American football player
- Buddy Burris (1923–2007), American professional football player
- Carol Corbett Burris (born 1953), American educator and administrator
- David Burris (fl. 1990s–present), American filmmaker and television producer
- Elli Burris (born 1989), American professional soccer player
- Harold Burris-Meyer (1902–1984), American scientist
- Henry Burris (born 1975), American professional football player
- Jack Burris (1917–1952), American attorney and murder victim
- Jeff Burris (born 1972), American professional football player
- Jesse Burris (born 1982), American politician from Kansas
- John Burris (born 1945), American attorney
- John Burris (Arkansas politician) (born 1986), American politician from Arkansas
- John M. Burris (born 1946), American politician from Delaware
- Juston Burris (born 1993), American professional football player
- Kurt Burris (1932–1999), American gridiron football player
- Miles Burris (born 1988), American professional football player
- Patrick Burris (born 1950), American martial artist
- Patrick Tracy Burris (1967–2009), American spree killer
- Paul Burris (baseball) (1923–1999), American professional baseball player
- Pearl Burris-Floyd (fl. 2000s), American politician from North Carolina
- Ray Burris (born 1950), American professional baseball player
- Robert H. Burris (1914–2010), American biochemist
- Roland Burris (born 1937), American politician from Illinois
- Roy "Goose" Burris (1901–1990), American professional basketball player
- Samuel Burris (1808–1869), American abolitionist
- Samuel Burris (baseball) (1919–1982), American Negro League baseball player
- Timothy Burris, American lutenist
- Tony Burris (American football), American professional football player
- Tony K. Burris (1929–1951), American Choctaw soldier

== Places ==
- Bost-Burris House
- Burris Creek (Fisher River tributary)
- Burris Fork
- Burris Fork Township, Moniteau County, Missouri
- Burris House and Potawatomi Spring
- Burris Laboratory School
- Burris Nunatak

== See also ==
- Burress (disambiguation)
- Burri (disambiguation)
- Burriss (disambiguation)
