= Andrew Rutherford =

Andrew Rutherford may refer to:

- Andrew Rutherford, 1st Earl of Teviot (died 1664), mercenary and Scottish peer
- Andrew Rutherford (English scholar) (1929–1998), Regius Professor of English Literature at the University of Aberdeen and Warden of Goldsmiths College, University of London
- Andrew Rutherford (pastoralist) (c. 1809–1894), Australian pastoralist and politician
- Andrew Rutherford (politician) (1842–1918), New Zealand sheep breeder and politician
- Andrew Rutherford (rector) (fl. 1840s), rector of the University of Glasgow
- Andrew Rutherford (lutenist) (born 195?), American lutenist and luthier
- Andrew Rutherford (swimmer) (born 1972), Hong Kong swimmer

== See also ==
- Drew Rutherford (1953–2005), footballer
- Andrew Rutherfurd (disambiguation)
