= Richard Dumbrill =

Richard Dumbrill may refer to:

- Richard Dumbrill (cricketer)
- Richard Dumbrill (musicologist)
