= Patrick O'Brien (musician) =

American guitarist and lutenist

Background information
- Born: 1947
- Died: July 16, 2014 (aged 67)

Patrick O'Brien (1947 – July 16, 2014) was an American guitarist and lutenist born in New York. He was a recording artist, but was best known as a pedagogue in the field of early plucked instruments in America, and an expert in musicians' hand anatomy. He has worked with musicians on many instruments, reworking their technique around repetitive stress injuries and breakdowns of coordination.

== Biography ==
Patrick O'Brien was born in Brooklyn, New York in 1947. He was an admirer and a student of many American folk and jazz musicians, in particular Reverend Gary Davis.

O'Brien taught early, classical, and other guitars, lute, archlute, theorbo and early harp in his native New York City for over fifty years. He was active as a continuo lutenist, guitarist, citternist and theorbist, and performed throughout Europe and North America with the Harp Consort, Baltimore Consort, Schola Antiqua, New York City Opera; and at the Caramoor, Spoleto and Boston Early Music festivals. He served on the faculties of the Mannes College of Music, the State and City Universities of New York and the annual Lute Society of America's Seminar. He was a plucked instrument instructor for the Baroque program at Juilliard.

His students included, among others, Jozef van Wissem, Andrew Rutherford, Mara Galassi, and Roman Turovsky who in 2014 composed a tombeau on O'Brien's death.

== Discography ==
Patrick O'Brien has made several recordings with the Harp Consort, The King's Noyse and Paul O'Dette.
