= Cezar Mateus =

American musician (born 1961)

Cezar Mateus (born 1961 in Bucharest, Romania) is an American luthier working in Princeton, New Jersey. He specializes in lutes, archlutes, theorbos and other related instruments. His instruments have been played by Sting, Edin Karamazov, Yasunori Imamura, Roman Turovsky, Miguel Yisrael, Ariel Abramovich, Eric Redlinger (of Asteria Musica) and Evangelina Mascardi.
