= Stephen Murphy (lutemaker) =

Australian lute maker

Stephen Murphy (born May 26, 1942 in Sydney, Australia) is a lute maker located in Southern France at Mollans-sur-Ouvèze.

He makes lutes, archlutes, theorbos, Renaissance and Baroque guitars and vihuelas.

Since 1972 he has built over 400 instruments based on originals from the 16th and 17th centuries.
