= Sistil =

South American lute

String instrument
- Classification: string
- Hornbostel–Sachs classification: 321.322 (Composite chordophone)

Related instruments
- Mandolin Twelve-string guitar

The sistil is a South American lute with twelve strings in six courses and a scale length intermediate between a guitar and a mandolin.
