= Andrew Rutherford (lutenist) =

American musician

Andrew Rutherford (born in 195?) is an American lutenist and luthier living and working in Albany and New York City. He is considered to be one of the most important contemporary makers of Renaissance and Baroque lutes, archlutes and theorbos.

His instruments are played by many notable lutenists, in particular by Robert Barto, Patrick O'Brien and Paul O'Dette.
