= Jakob Lindberg =

Swedish lutenist

- Born: 16 October 1952 (age 74); Sweden
- Occupation: Actor

Jakob Lindberg (born 16 October 1952) is a Swedish lutenist, performing solo, in small and large ensembles, and also directing operas, using instruments of the lute and guitar families. He is known for the first ever recording of the Complete Solo Lute Music of John Dowland as well as for recording music never before recorded, with repertoire dating back to the Renaissance period.

== Biography ==
Jakob Lindberg was born in Djursholm, Sweden on 16 October 1952 and began his studies on the guitar with his first inspirations being the music of The Beatles. At the age of fourteen, he started studying the guitar with Jörgen Rörby; it was Rörby who first introduced Lindberg to the lute.

Lindberg studied music at Stockholm University before going on to study at the Royal College of Music in London. He combined his studies with Diana Poulton on lute and classical guitar with Carlos Bonell at the RCM and began to focus his attention on performing Renaissance and Baroque music on period instruments. Lindberg's solo Wigmore Hall recital debut took place in 1978, and he has subsequently toured internationally throughout Europe, the United States and Canada, Japan, Mexico, Russia, and Australia, as a soloist, accompanist, continuo player, and ensemble/consort player.

== Teaching ==
Lindberg started teaching as a professor of lute at the Royal College of Music in London in 1979, taking over the position from Diana Poulton, together with taking part in lecture recitals (as for example Gresham College, London).

== Performing ==
Lindberg has recorded lute music that had never before been recorded, largely under the BIS label. Recorded works include Italian chitarrone collections, music by Scottish composers, the first ever recording of the complete solo lute music by John Dowland, and solo lute works of Johann Sebastian Bach, together with chamber music by Vivaldi, Boccherini, and Haydn.

He founded the Dowland Consort in 1985, which specialized in performing music from Elizabethan and Jacobean times, most notably John Dowland and Sylvius Leopold Weiss. As a continuo player (theorbo, chitarrone, and archlute), he has performed with many period instrument ensembles, such as the English Concert, the Orchestra of the Age of Enlightenment, the Academy of Ancient Music, the Taverner Choir, the Monteverdi Choir, the Purcell Quartet, and the Chiaroscuro Quartet. He is a frequent accompanist for singers such as Nigel Rogers, Ian Partridge, Emma Kirkby, and Anne Sofie von Otter. Lindberg has directed several Baroque operas from the chitarrone at the Drottningholm Palace Theatre as a production staged by the Royal Swedish Opera. His opera performances include Purcell's Dido and Aeneas in 1995 in which he collaborated with Andrew Parrot, and Jacopo Peri's Euridice in 1997. On 3 July 2013, Lindberg gave a concert of the music of John Dowland at The Queen's Gallery, Buckingham Palace to coincide with the 350th anniversary of John Dowland's birth.

Lindberg appears in and plays the lute in the 1983 Doctor Who episode "The King's Demons".

== Instruments ==
- Rauwolf Lute: made by Sixtus Rauwolf, Augsburg c. 1590, one of the few extant, "possibly the world's oldest lute in playing condition." Originally a 7-8 course instrument, modified in 1715 to incorporate an extended neck, with the work labelled "Leonhard Mausiel of Nüremberg 1715" inside the lute body. The restoration has been made for this instrument to accommodate 11-course d minor, or 10-course Renaissance tuning/stringing.
- 6-course lute: made by Michael Lowe, Oxford 1985, based on European lutes used c.1500-1550.
- 8-course lute: made by Michael Lowe, Oxford 1980, based on an Italian 1580 model, employing yew wood for the back ribs, each strip containing both sapwood and heartwood rendering a stunning natural striped effect.
- 10-course lute: made by Michael Lowe, Oxford 1977, with a yew wood back of 31 ribs.
- 13-course lute: made by Michael Lowe, Oxford 1981, based on models from c.1720 Germany, with a rosewood back, and a lower pegbox extended to an upper pegbox, supporting longer bass strings, lending a rich strength of sound to the lower tessitura.

== Compositions dedicated to Jakob Lindberg ==
Composer: Richard Popplewell; Title: Variations on Brigg Fair; Scoring: solo lute; Date: 1988.

== Discography ==
BIS no.	Title	Collaborating Artists	Release date	Other label info
BIS 201	Lute Music from Scotland and France		1982/3	
BIS 211	Virtuoso Lute Music from Italy and England		1982	
BIS 257	Faire, Sweet & Cruell	Lute songs with Christina Högman	1983	
BIS 266	Italian and English Music for Recorder and Lute	with Clas Pehrsson	1984	
BIS 267	English Lute Duets	with Paul O'Dette	1984	
BIS 290	Antonio Vivaldi: The Complete Works for the Italian Lute of his Period	with members of the Drottningholm Baroque Ensemble	1985	
BIS 293	Songs for the Guitar	with Christina Högman	1985	
BIS 315	Lachrimae	directing the Dowland Consort	1985	
BIS 327	Baroque Music for Lute and Guitar		1986	
BIS 341	Three, Four and Twenty Lutes	with nineteen other lutenists	1985	
BIS 360	Joseph Haydn: Complete Works for Lute and Strings	with members of the Drottningholm Baroque Ensemble	1987	
BIS 390	Music from the time of Christian IV	includes lute solos and directing the Dowland Consort	1987	
BIS 391	Music from the time of Christian IV	includes songs with Rogers Covey-Crump	1987	
BIS 399	Serenissima I Lute Music in Venice 1500-1550		1988	
BIS 430	John Dowland: First Booke of Songes	with Rogers Covey-Crump	1988	
BIS 451	Heavenly Noyse	directing the Dowland Consort	1989/90	
BIS 469	Anthony Holborne	directing the Dowland Consort	1989/90	
BIS 587-588	Bach's Lute Music		1992	
BIS 597-598	Luigi Boccherini: Quintets with Guitar 1-6	with members of the Drottningholm Baroque Ensemble	1992	
BIS 599	Serenissima II Lute Music in Venice 1500-1550		1991	
BIS 722-724	John Dowland: The Complete Solo Lute Music		1994	
BIS 799	Francesco Corbetta: Guitar Music		1996	
BIS 824	John Dowland: Selected Lute Music		1994	
BIS 899	Spanish Guitar Music		1999	
BIS 1199	Seven Suites of Swedish Folk Tunes		2000	
BIS 1415	Cataldo Amodei	with Emma Kirkby and Lars Ulrik Mortensen		
BIS 1505	Musique and Sweet Poetrie	With Emma Kirkby		
BIS 1524	Weiss: Lute Music			
BIS 1534	Weiss: Lute Music 2			
BIS 1725	Orpheus in England - Dowland and Purcell	With Emma Kirkby		
BIS 1899	Italian Virtuosi of the Chitarrone			
BIS 2055	Jacobean Lute Music			
BIS 2265	A Lute by Sixtus Rauwolf - French and German Baroque Music			
	Dowland	Consort of Musicke	1977	DSLO533
	Handel's Watermusic	Academy of Ancient Music - Christopher Hogwood	1978	Decca Florilegium
	Monteverdi's Ulysses	London Philharmonic Orchestra - Raymond Leppard	1979	CBS Masterworks
	Dowland - A Miscellany	Consort of Musicke	1979	DSLO556
	Biagio Marini - Le Lagrime d'Erminia and Violin Sonatas	Consort of Musicke	1979	DSLO570
	Dowland - Mr Henry Noell Lamentations - Psalmes & Sacred Songs	Consort of Musicke	1978/1979	DSLO551
	John Dowland - The Complete Solo Lute Music (one of five)		1980	Decca Florilegium
	John Danyel - Lute Songs	Consort of Musicke	1981	DSLO568
	William Lawes - Royal Consorts	Consort of Musicke	1981	Decca Florilegium
	Handel: La Riserrectione	Academy of Ancient Music - Christopher Hogwood	1980	Decca Florilegium
	John Blow: "Cupid and Death"	Consort of Musicke	1983	Deutsche Harmonia Mundi
	Monteverdi: Balli et Balletti	English Baroque Soloists and Monteverdi Choir - J E Gardiner	1983	Archiv
	Monteverdi: Orfeo	Nigel Rogers - London Baroque	1984	EMI
	The Florentine Intermedi 1589	Parrott, Taverner Choir, Consort and Players	1986	EMI
	Bach: St John Passion	English Baroque Soloists, Monteverdi Choir - J E Gardiner	1986	Archiv
	Monteverdi: Orfeo	English Baroque Soloists, Monteverdi Choir - J E Gardiner	1987	Archiv
	Monteverdi: Vespers 1610	English Baroque Soloists, Monteverdi Choir - J E Gardiner	1989	Archiv
	The Carol Album: Seven Centuries of Christmas Music	Taverner Consort, Choir and Players	1989	
	Monteverdi's Poppea	English Baroque Soloists, Monteverdi Choir - J E Gardiner	1993	Archiv
	Walter Porter: Madrigals and Airs	Consort of Musicke	1993, rec. 80s	Musica Oscura
	The Genteel Companion	Richard Harvey, Mark Caudle, Sarah Cunningham, Moniga Huggett, Timothy Roberts, Philip Thorby	1986	ASV DCA 558 / Harmonia mundi GAU 117
	Vivaldi: Gloria; Handel: Gloria, Dixit Dominus	English Baroque Soloists, Monteverdi Choir - J E Gardiner	Nov 1998/Jun 2001	Philips 4625972
	A Baroque Festival - Bach, Handel et al	Parrott	17/10/2000	EMI - Virgin Classics [All429] UPC: 724356130425
	Capriccio Stravagante - Vol. 2		2001	Chandos 9511506702
	Gaudeamus - Early Music Sampler		1996	Asv Living Era 1115849
	Lamenti	Anne Sofie von Otter	1999	Deutsche Grammophon
	Home for Christmas	Anne Sofie von Otter	1997	Deutsche Grammophon - Archiv - 457-617-2
	Mad About Angels		1995	Polygram Records, Deutsche Grammophon 028944911329
	Mad About Vivaldi		1993	Deutsche Grammophon 2894395162
	The Pocket Purcell	Parrott, Taverner Consort	2000, rec. 80s	Virgin Classics 2435451162
	Purcell: Te Deum & Jubilate, etc	Parrott, Taverner Players	2000, rec. 80s	Virgin Classics 2435450612
	Purcell: Odes for Saint Cecilia, etc	Parrott, Taverner Consort, Choir and Players	1988	Virgin Veritas 724356158221
	JS Bach: Heart's Solace	Parrott, Taverner Consort and Players	1997	Sony 01-060155-10
	Monteverdi: Madrigali guerrieri et amorosi	Parrott, Taverner Consort and Players	1991	EMI 7543332
	Vivaldi: Four Seasons / Gloria	The English Concert - Trevor Pinnock	2000, rec: 80s	Deutsche Grammophon 2894692202
	Vivaldi Concertos	The English Concert - Trevor Pinnock	2001, rec: 80s	Deutsche Grammophon 2894713172
	It Fell on a Summers Day	Ian Partridge	1983	Hyperion - CDH 88011
	Romantic Songs for Tenor and Guitar	Ian Partridge		Pavilion Records- SHECD 9608
	Monteverdi & d'India: Mannerist Madrigals	Nigel Rogers, Chiaroscuro, London Baroque	1981	EMI Virgin Classics 7243 5 61165 2 8
	Corelli Sonatas for Strings	Purcell Quartet		Chandos 0694 (4)
	Johannes-Passion BWV 245	Choir of New College, Oxford - Edward Higginbottom	2001	Naxos
	The Top Ten of Sweden's Great Power Period	Skaraborg Vocal Ensemble	1993	Proprius - PRCD 9083
	Återspeglingar - Svenska Sånger	Anna Emilsson	2007	Todo Production - TOP01

== Family ==
His younger brother is the trombonist Christian Lindberg.
