= Andrew Rutherfurd =

Andrew Rutherfurd may refer to:

- Andrew Rutherfurd, Lord Rutherfurd (1791–1854), Scottish advocate, judge and politician
- Andrew Rutherfurd (swimmer), Bolivian swimmer

== See also ==
- Andrew Rutherfurd-Clark, Lord Rutherfurd-Clark (1828–1899), Scottish judge
- Andrew Rutherford (disambiguation)
