= Burris Fork Township, Moniteau County, Missouri =

Township in the American state of Missouri

Coordinates: 38.5033°N 92.5175°W

Burris Fork Township is an inactive township in Moniteau County, in the U.S. state of Missouri.

Burris Fork Township takes its name from Burris Fork creek.
