= Burriss =

Burriss is a surname. Notable people with the surname include:

- Alexander Burriss (born 1990), American YouTuber better known as Alex Wassabi
- Emmanuel Burriss (born 1985), American baseball player
- Milford Burriss (1937–2016), American businessman and politician
- Moffatt Burriss (1919–2019), American businessman and politician

== See also ==
- Burress
- Burris
