= Mara Galassi =

Italian musician

Background information
- Born: 1956 (age 69–70); Milan, Italy
- Genres: Early music
- Occupations: Harpist, musicologist
- Instruments: Early harps (Gothic, Renaissance, Baroque), classical pedal harp

Mara Galassi (born 1956 in Milan) is an Italian harpist, musicologist and recording artist specializing in the music for Early harps, including Gothic, Renaissance, and Baroque, in particular double (cross-strung) and triple harps of the Renaissance and Baroque eras, as well as Classical era single-action pedal harps.

She holds degrees from Pesaro Conservatory of Music and the Civica Scuola di Musica in Milan. She studied historical performance practice under harpsichordist David Collyer in Amsterdam, lutenist Patrick O'Brien in New York City, and musicology with Michael Morrow in London.

Since 2013 she is a professor of modern and historical harps at the Civica Scuola di Musica di Milano. She is a founding member of the Historical Harp Society.

Mara Galassi is active as a soloist, as well as a member of early music Ensembles, including Hesperion XX (dir. Jordi Savall), Concerto Soave, Concerto Vocale (dir. René Jacobs), Concerto Italiano (dir. Rinaldo Alessandrini), Mala Punica (dir. Pedro Memelsdorff), and Cantus Cölln (dir. Konrad Junghänel).

Galassi is also a musicologist doing research on historical harps.

Her CD "Il Viaggio di Lucrezia" won the Cannes Award and "Choc de la Musique" awards.

== Filmography ==
- VOLUPTAS DOLENDI: I Gesti del Caravaggio (а film by Francesco Vitali, with Mara Galassi & Deda Cristina Colonna)

== Discography ==
- Davidsharfen: Mara Galassi & Flora Papadopoulos (2024 Glossa GCD 921305)
- Il Viaggio Di Lucrezia: Solo Harp – Mara Galassi (Glossa CD ASIN: B000047988)
- G.F.Handel: Microcosm Concerto (Label: PID ASIN: B002USOVQO)
- Gabriela Bosio & Mara Galassi: Les Harpes du Ciel
- Domenico Cimarosa: Salon de femmes in Saint Petersburg, Opus III: OP30299 Release Date: 10-Sep-2001
