= Lutz Kirchhof =

German lutenist

Lutz Kirchhof (born 1953, in Frankfurt am Main) is a German lutenist. He often performs with his wife Marina as the Kirchhof duo.

In 1996 he founded the Deutsche Lautengesellschaft (German Association for Lute). He performs in festivals all over the world, giving about a hundred concerts a year since 2002.

He performs regularly with vocalists such as Max van Egmond and Derek Lee Ragin, and numerous instrumentalists.

Numerous recordings have appeared and he has recorded for Sony Classical, but now publishes his recordings independently.
