= Louys de Moy =

Dutch musician

Louys de Moy was a Dutch lutenist and composer mainly known for his anthology Le Petit Boucquet de Frise orientale. It was produced in 1631 for the marriage of Count Ulrich of East Friesland and Princess Juliana of Hessen.

== Recordings ==
Louys de Moy: Airs de Cour (1632) "Lieder für ein fürstliches Brautpaar" Due sopra il Basso
