= Evangelina Mascardi =

Argentine musician

- Born: Maria Evangelina Mascardi; April 11, 1977 (age 49); Buenos Aires, Argentina
- Origin: Argentina
- Genre: Classical
- Occupations: Musician, teacher
- Instruments: lute; guitar; theorbo; vihuela
- Label: Arcana (a label of Outhere Music)
- Website: http://www.evangelinamascardi.com

Maria Evangelina Mascardi (born April 11, 1977) is an Argentine lutenist, guitarist, and theorbist, resident of Orte in Italy, and a professor of lute at the Conservatorio Antonio Vivaldi in Alessandria, Italy.

== Life ==
Born in Buenos Aires, Argentina, in 1977, into an Italian family originating in Liguria she graduated in classical guitar and started her concert career there. She studied music at the National Music Academy Juan Pedro Esnaola with Silvia Fernandez and Gabriel Schebor, where she graduated as a state-certified music teacher. She moved to Europe in 1997 and decided to study lute at the Schola Cantorum Basiliensis-Swiss Music Academy in Basel, Switzerland. She graduated as a soloist in lutenist Hopkinson Smith's class in 2001, obtaining her “Solisten Diplom” in 2001. She then acquired another academic degree while working as a soloist with Tiziano Bagnati at Benedetto Marcello Conservatory.

She has accompanied soloists such as Jordi Savall, Andrea Marcon, Giovanni Antonini and Simon Rattle as a Continuo player, participating in 30 CD productions. She has now devoted herself solely to lute solo performances, sometimes playing in ensembles, such as the Ensemble Zefiro under Alfredo Bernardini or the Monteverdi Choir under John Eliot Gardiner.

She is known for her recordings of the complete lute works of Johann Sebastian Bach, and Sylvius Leopold Weiss.

Mascardi began teaching Hauptfach Laute in 2010 at the Conservatorio Antonio Vivaldi in Alessandria, Italy. She is also artistic director in the Course on Early Music Ottaviano Alberti in Orte.

== Discography (solo lute) ==
Mascardi has recorded five solo albums, including two of works by Bach and Weiss (ORF-Alte Musik, Austria 2003 and 2009), and one of theorbo solos by the Modena-born Bellerofonte Castaldi (Arcana 2011) and one of works by the Belgian lutenist and composer Laurent de Saint-Luc (Musique en Wallonie 2018). In 2022 she released a new album, J. S. Bach: Complete Lute Works (released on March 18, 2022, Label: Arcana, available as a CD, but also as a digital download. She has also recorded compositions for the vihuela.

- Johann Sebastian Bach: Complete Lute Works on AllMusic site
- Bach, Weiss on Rate Your Music site
- Laurent de Saint-Luc: Pièces pour Luth on AllMusic site
- Milano Spagnola: Para tecla y vihuela on AllMusic site
- Castaldi: Ferita d'Amore on AllMusic site

== See also ==
- Lute Suite in C minor, BWV 997
