= Timothy Burris =

American musician

Timothy Allen Burris is an American lutenist.

He studied under Toyohiko Satoh at the Royal Conservatory of The Hague, graduating in 1988. From 1990 to 1996, Timothy Burris was lute instructor at the Royal Flemish Conservatory in Antwerp, Belgium.

His PhD thesis researches lute practice in 18th-century Dresden: Lute and Theorbo in Vocal Music in 18th-Century Dresden: A Performance Practice Study (Duke University, 1997).

Currently, he teaches lute at the Portland Conservatory of Music in Portland, Maine.

== Recordings ==
- Bach meets Weiss (remastered 2007; originally recorded in 1990 as "Lute Music in Kursachsen, Circa 1730")
- Recording samples (Music's Quill at Early Music America)
- Ciaccona (2012, includes Mr Burris' transcription of Bach's Ciaccona from BWV 1004)
- The Songs of Philip Rosseter, Part I (with Timothy Neill Johnson, tenor, as the ensemble Music's Quill] (2007: Along with Part II, below, constitutes the first complete recording of Philip Rosseter's only book of lute songs)
- The Songs of Philip Rosseter, Part II (with Timothy Neill Johnson, tenor, as the ensemble Music's Quill] (2010: Along with Part I, above, constitutes the first complete recording of Philip Rosseter's only book of lute songs)
- Lagrime mie: Early songs of love and torment (PGM-103: with Jennifer Lane, mezzo-soprano)
- Divoti Affetti: Early Music at the Court at Dresden (PGM-106: with Tamara Matthews, soprano; Jennifer Lane, mezzo-soprano; Jorg-Michael Schwarz & Karen Marmer, violins; Loretta O'Sullivn, cello; Timothy Burris, lute & theorbo; Eric Milnes, organ & harpsichord)
- The Buxtehude Project: Vol. I: Sacred Cantatas (PGM-102: The Sarum Consort; Chamber Choir of St. Peter's in the Great Valley; Martha N. Johnson, conductor, with Timothy Burris on theorbo)
- Dido and Aeneas (with soloists Wilke te Brummelstroete, Tom Sol, Paulien van der Werff, and Liduin Stumpel and Koorproject Rotterdam, under the direction of Maarten Michielsen)
- In Morte di Madonna Laura (with Vocaal Ensemble Pentacost, [sic] includes Mr Burris on theorbo continuo and lute solos by Pietro Paolo Melii and Santino Garsi da Parma)
