= Jack Burris =

American lawyer

Jack Burris (May 27, 1917 – June 1952) served as County attorney of Mayes County, Oklahoma from 1947 until his murder in June 1952. He was the subject of one of the most famous unsolved murders in Oklahoma history. His assassination and the investigation by Sheriff Slim Weaver and the Oklahoma State Bureau of Investigation has been the basis for several books and screenplays for over 50 years.

== Biography ==
During a 1979 documentary on the Girl Scout murders, Sheriff L.L. "Slim" Weaver referred to the Burris case and retraced his route to the scene. Comparing the two he claimed he picked up photographer Merle Cloud on the way to the Burris house and they were passed by a white pickup truck with a cattle guard going in the opposite direction. Weaver said he believed this to be the killer. Cloud had been with Burris earlier in the week taking photos of illegal activities in Langley, Oklahoma. According to the Oklahoma Bureau of Investigation, the killer waited outside the house for Burris with a shotgun. A newsman from KOLS radio station in Pryor, Oklahoma later secretly recorded an interview with a man claiming to be Burris' killer. The newsman described him as a "quiet man from Vinita" but never turned the tape over to authorities. Weaver said he did not learn of the existence of the tape until October, 1958. Rather than notify the Oklahoma Bureau of Investigation of its existence, Weaver spent the next five months "negotiating" for it. In March, 1959 the newsman disappeared and the case remains unsolved.

== See also ==
- List of unsolved murders (1900–1979)
