= Robert Barto =

American musician

Robert Barto (born 1950s in San Diego) is an American lutenist specializing in the music of the Baroque and Empfindsamkeit periods, in particular the oeuvres of Sylvius Leopold Weiss and Bernhard Joachim Hagen.

== Biography ==
He is a graduate of the University of California, San Diego, having majored in historical lute performance. The recipient of a Fulbright scholarship, he continued his studies in Cologne, Germany and at the Schola Cantorum Basiliensis in Switzerland, with Michael Schäffer and Eugen Müller-Dombois, respectively. Having made Germany his home for many years, he travels and performs throughout the world.

In 1984, Barto took top honors at the "International Lute Competition" in Toronto and the competition Musica Antiqua Bruges, Belgium. His performances of note have included solo recitals at the Festival of Flanders, London's Purcell Room, the Utrecht Festival, and in New York City's "Music Before 1800" event. In 2000, Barto performed a tribute to Sylvius Leopold Weiss in Dresden. He also gave solo recitals for Bavarian Radio's "Bach Night" in Munich as well as the "Lufthansa Baroque Festival" also held in London.

He is greatly sought after as a teacher, having given master classes in Spain, Sweden, Germany, Italy and Japan. He has regularly been on the faculty of the Lute Society of America's Summer Seminar series.

== Discography ==
Barto has recorded eleven volumes of lute sonatas by baroque lutenist-composer Sylvius Leopold Weiss and two CDs of the solo works of Bernhard Joachim Hagen for the Naxos and Symphonia labels.

Barto also recorded a part of soundtrack of an audiovisual installation by the Ukrainian artist and composer Roman Turovsky-Savchuk.
