= Rauwolf Lute =

16th century lute

The Rauwolf Lute was made by Sixtus Rauwolf in Augsburg, Germany. Rauwolf was active as a lutemaker there from 1577 until ca.1625. The lute now known as the "Rauwolf Lute" is estimated to have been made in 1590. Only six surviving lutes made by Rauwolf are known, all having been altered over the years to satisfy changing musical tastes, such as a new neck installed on this one in 1715 by Leonard Mausiel, Nuremberg. The lute has "a very attractive and finely varnished maple back, and soundboard with many original bars, made by Sixtus Rauwolf".

The lute's owner, lutenist Jakob Lindberg, describes the instrument: "My lute... would originally have been probably a 7 or 8-course lute. There is also inside the lute a label of Leonhard Mausiel of Nüremberg dated 1715 and undoubtedly this was the time when the lute was given its new neck and "updated" into an 11-course lute...This "renaissance" lute therefore has been restored to its latest playable condition as an 11-course "baroque" lute, although it can also be strung as a 10-course lute in "renaissance" tuning."

The instrument was reconstructed and repaired recently. The goal of the reconstruction of this lute was to "achieve a conceivable historical correctness." The process involved studying other lutes made by Rauwolf. The reconstruction was done by Stephen Gottlieb, the lutemaker Michael Lowe, and the violin maker David Munro. The reconstruction process has been documented in detail.

The Rauwolf Lute has become more widely known through Jakob Lindberg's recordings playing the instrument, e.g. Bach on the Rauwolf Lute, 2021, Catalogue No: BIS2552.
