= Burris Fork =

Stream in the U.S. state of Missouri

Coordinates: 38°34′45″N 92°32′40″W

Burris Fork is a stream in Moniteau and Morgan counties in the U.S. state of Missouri. It is a tributary of North Moreau Creek.

The stream headwaters arise in Morgan County adjacent to Missouri Route 52 approximately three miles southeast of Versailles at . The stream flows to the northeast into Moniteau County and passes under Missouri Route 87 to enter the North Moreau approximately four miles southeast of California at .

Burris Fork has the name of the local Burris family, the original owners of the site.
