= Richard Dumbrill (musicologist) =

French archaeomusicologist (born 1947)

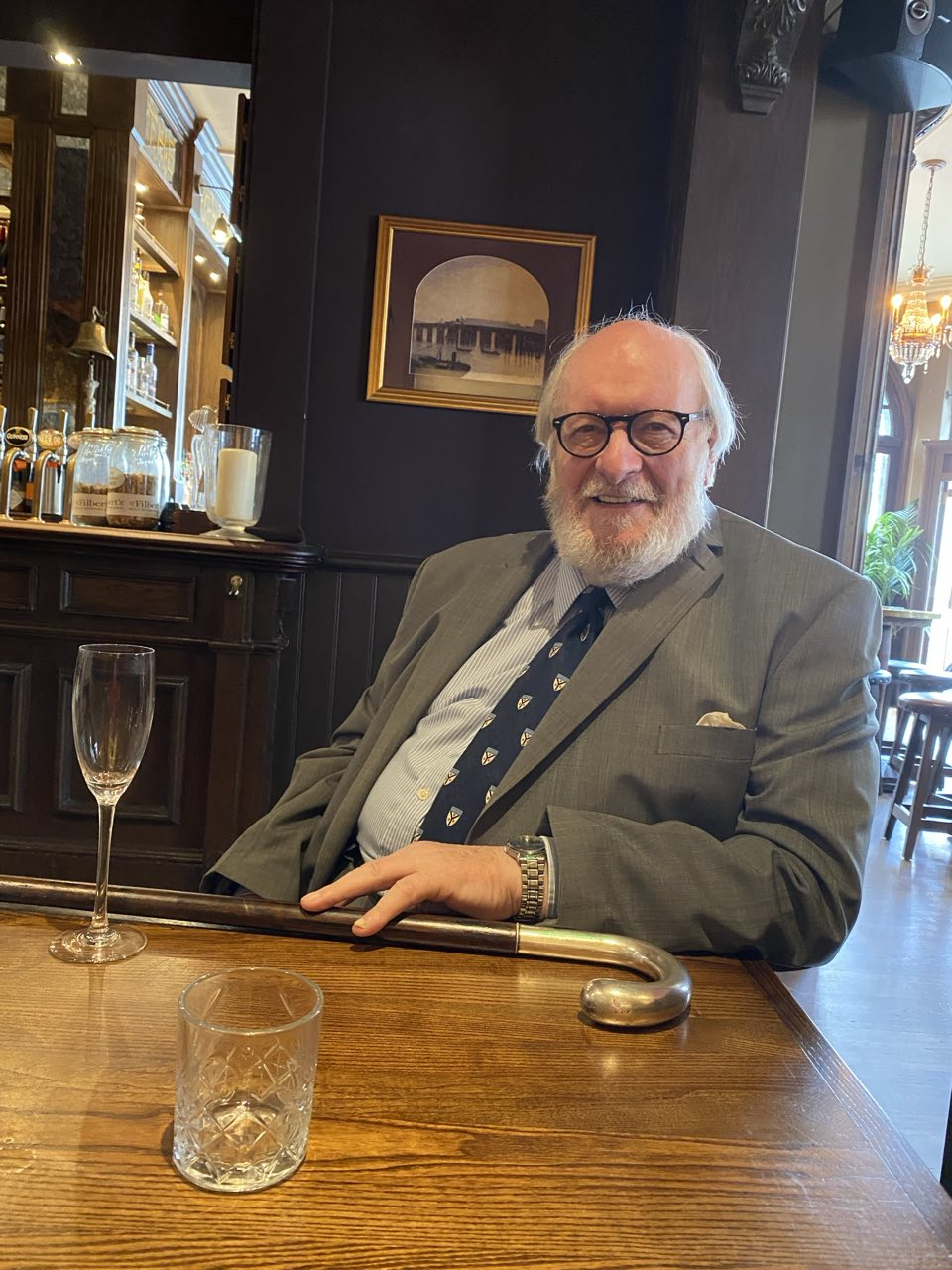
- Dumbrill in July 2024
- Born: 1947 (age 78–79); Epernay, France
- Known for: Study of the archaeomusicology of the Ancient Near East

Academic work
- Discipline: Musicology
- Sub-discipline: Archaeomusicology
- Institutions: University of London
- Notable works: Semitic Music Theory

Richard J. Dumbrill (Epernay; born 1947) is a British/French archaeomusicologist and composer. He is a relativist musicologist who opposes Universalism and Occicentrism theories in his field.

Dumbrill has studied the archaeomusicology of the Ancient Near East, especially the interpretation of cuneiform texts of Music Theory written in Sumerian, Babylonian and Hurrian.

== Career ==
Dumbrill's interpretation of music theory is based on his knowledge of Middle-Oriental Musicology. He rejects (Pythagorean) ditonism and heptatonism, as a model for Oriental music and particularly rejects the hypothesis of the use of dichords in the Musicology of the Ancient Near East.

Dumbrill offers another interpretation of the Hurrian songs, the oldest music ever written, which was found in northwest Syria at the site of Ugarit. He reconstructed the Silver lyre of Ur (at the British Museum), from Woolley's notes, with Myriam Marcetteau. Dumbrill also reconstructed the Elamite harp of the battle of Ulai, with Margaux Bousquet. Dumbrill donated one of his harps to the Ministry of Culture in Iraq.

Drumbill is the founder, with Irving Finkel of the International Council of Near Eastern Archaeomusicology (ICONEA) at the Institute of Musical Research, School of Advanced Studies, University of London.

Dumbrill has lectured at Harvard and Yale and in Iraq, Beirut, Damascus, Leiden, Rotterdam, Corpus Christi (Cambridge), and Paris.

== Works ==
=== Books ===
- Semitic Music Theory
- The Musicology and Organology of the Ancient Near East, second edition. Published thesis. Victoria, Canada.(2005) ISBN 978-1-4120-5538-3
- Idiophones of the Ancient Near East in the Collections of the British Museum 121 pages, Publisher: Gorgias Pr Llc (12 Jun. 2011) Language: English ISBN 978-1-61143-956-4 ISBN 978-1-61143-956-4
- The Silver Lyre of Ur Copyright Richard Dumbrill ICONEA PUBLICATIONS LONDON Published 28 May 2015 ISBN 978-1-326-28901-0
- Musical scenes on Seals and Seal Impressions of the Ancient Near EastRichard Dumbrill ICONEA PUBLICATIONS LONDON 2015 ISBN 978-1-326-28932-4
- The Truth about Babylonian Music Near Eastern Musicology Online 4 6 |2017-08| p. 91–121.
- Hurrian Song H6, score, transcribed from the original Cuneiform text. ICONEA PUBLICATIONS – LONDON
- Elegiac Poem to Ishtar, score, Composed by Richard Dumbrill ICONEA PUBLICATIONS – LONDON
- An Old Babylonian Lullaby. Score. Set to music by Richard Dumbrill for the BBC. ICONEA PUBLICATIONS – LONDON
- Ashurbanipal Wisdom Song. Score. This song was reconstructed by Richard Dumbrill after an original Wisdom poem dating from the first millennium BC. It was specially composed for the Great Ashurbanipal exhibition at the British Museum in November 2018. ICONEA PUBLICATIONS – LONDON.
- Song of Amun Re. Score. Composed by Richard Dumbrill on request from the Smithsonian Institution. ICONEA PUBLICATIONS – LONDON

=== Reviews ===
- Co-editor of NEMO-Online with Amine Beyhom
- Editor of ICONEA with Irving Finkel (2008)
- Co-editor with Bryan Carr of the Ernest McClain Memorial Volume, forthcoming
- Editor of Musical Traditions in the Middle-East. Proceedings of the International Conference held at Leiden University, 10–12 December 2009. Forthcoming.

=== Articles ===
- The Truth About Babylonian Music
- Middle East article, Music Prehistory to 1250
- New evidence for Neo-Babylonian Enneatonism in Music Theory
- Four mathematical texts from the Temple Library of Nippur
- Earliest Evidence of Heptatonism
- Goetterzahlen and scale Structure The Uruk Lute Elements of Metrology, The Morphology of the Babylonian Scale
- Is the heptagram in CBS 1766 a Dial
- Commentary on the new incised scapula from Tel Kinrot
- Entretiens de Musique Ancienne en Sorbonne

The Birth of Music Theory https://www.academia.edu/112552291/The_Birth_of_Music_Theory

Semitic Music Theory (2600–500 BC) https://www.academia.edu/38432560/Semitic_Music_Theory_2600_500_BC_
