= Burress =

Burress is a surname. Notable people with the surname include:

- Drew Burress (born 2004), American baseball player
- Hannibal Buress (born 1983), American comedian
- Hedy Burress (born 1973), American actress
- Plaxico Burress (born 1977), American football player
- Withers A. Burress (1894–1977), American general
- William Burress (1915–1939), American actor

== See also ==
- Burris (surname)
