= Kost Lavro =

Ukrainian artist and illustrator (born 1961)

Kost Lavro (born in 1961, Poltava Oblast) is a Ukrainian artist and illustrator. He is a close collaborator with the poet and publisher Ivan Malkovych. Laureate of Shevchenko National Prize in 2010.

== Biography ==
Kost Lavro was Born on March 11, 1961 near Dikanka (now Poltava region, Ukraine).

== Education ==
Lavro studied art early at the Shevchenko State Art School (his classmates there included Alina Panova, Roman Turovsky and Yuri Makoveychuk) and the Kyiv Polygraphic Institute. He graduated from the Faculty of Book Design of the Ukrainian Academy of Printing. He is a Member of the National Union of Artists or Ukraine.

== Career ==
In his works, he combined the fundamental tenets of the Ukrainian avant-garde of the 1920s with the typical features of Ukrainian folk painting. Kost Lavro's works were repeatedly included in the catalogues of children's book exhibitions in Bologna, Bratislava, and the like.

In addition to “A-ba-ba-ga-la-ma-gi”, he collaborates with the Ukrainian publishing house “Smart Child” and the popular French children's magazine “Pomme d’Api”.

Illustrations for the book “The Night Before Christmas” received several high book awards, including the title “Best Children’s Book of 2007” at the All-Ukrainian competition “Book of the Year” and a 1st degree diploma for winning the “Art of the Book” competition (Russia, 2007).

== Works ==
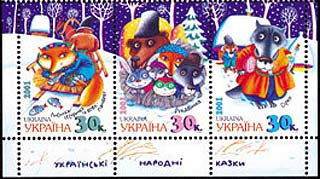
Ukrainian stamps "Ukrainian tales", 2001

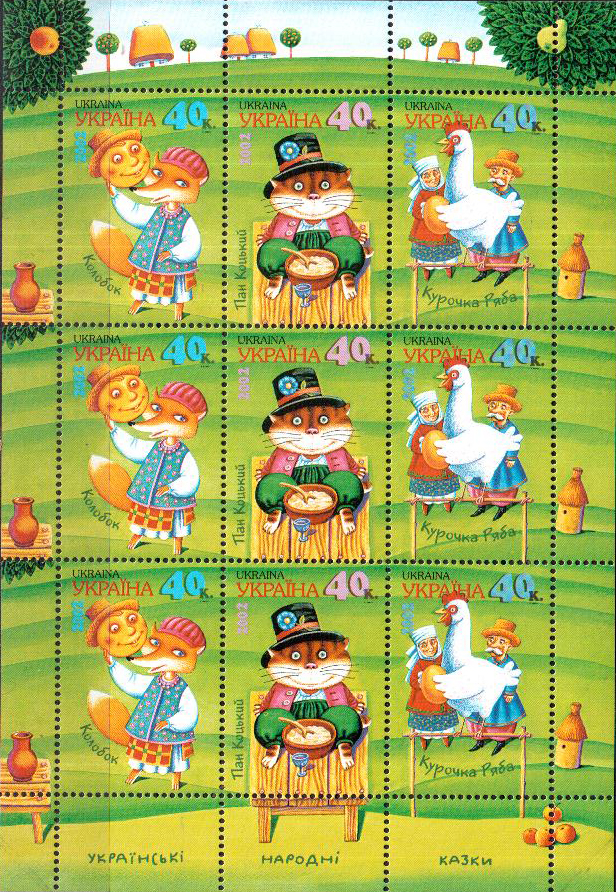
Ukrainian stamps "Ukrainian tales", 2002

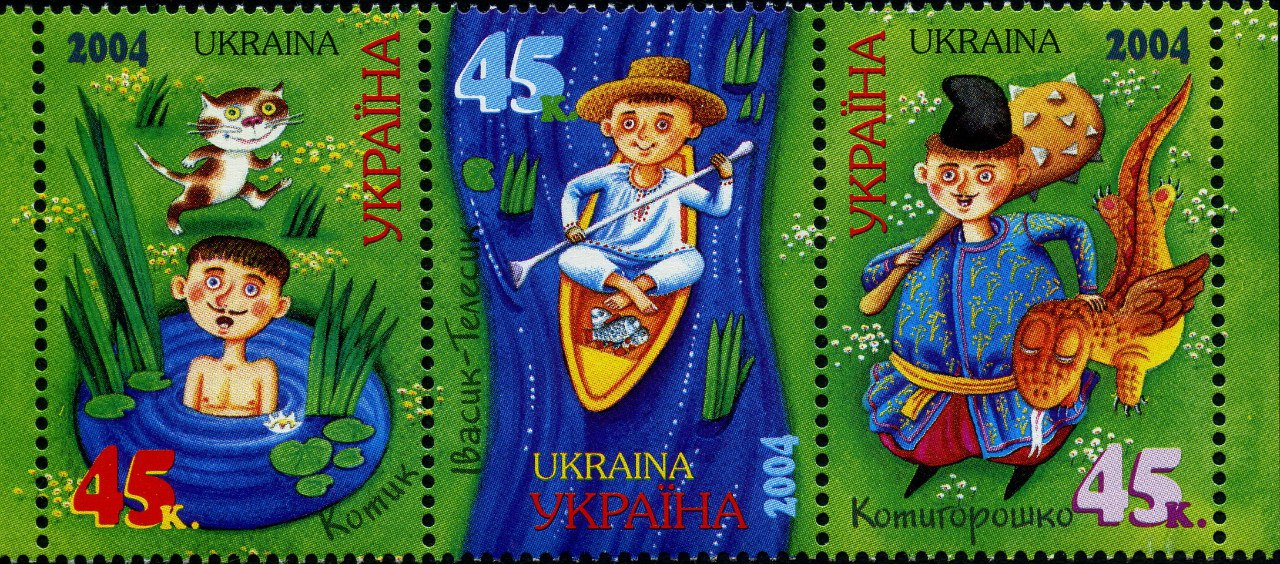
Ukrainian stamps "Ukrainian tales", 2004

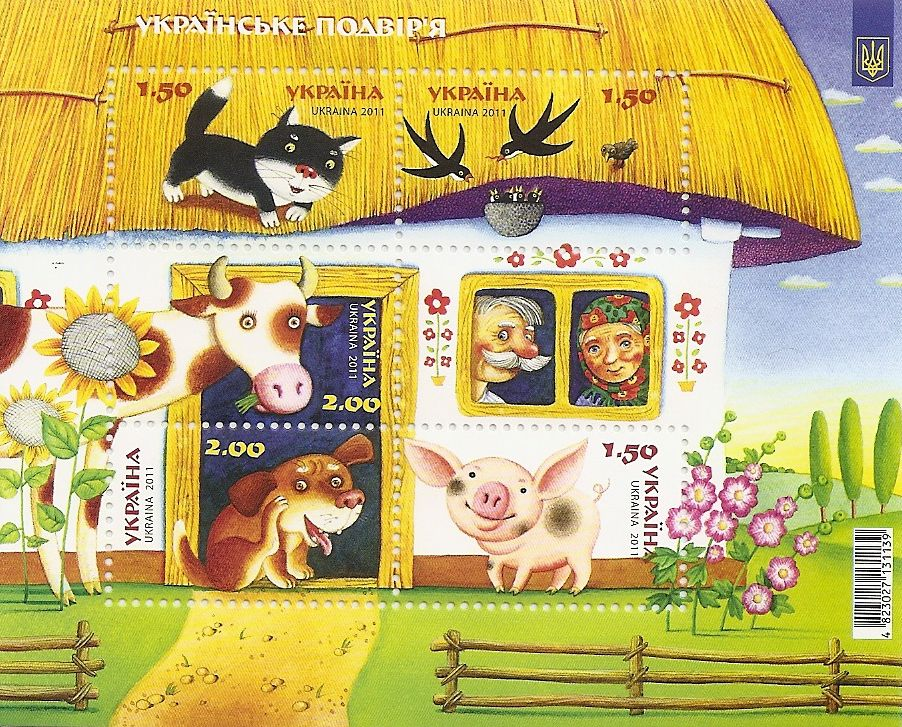
Ukrainian stamps, 2011

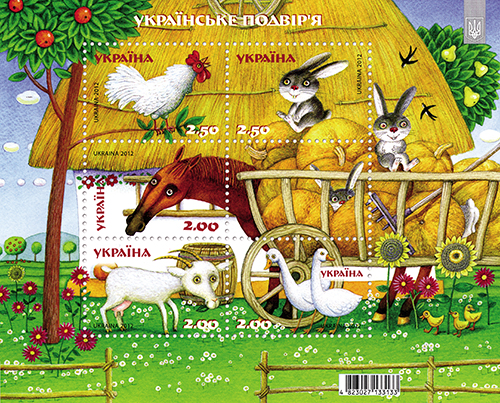
Ukrainian stamps, 2012
