= Charge scenic artist =

A charge scenic artist, also known as a charge artist or head scenic artist, leads and oversees the painting of stage, film, or television scenery.

The duties of the charge artist involve techniques for replicating color and texture, as well as preparing and aging various surfaces. The charge artist interprets the scenic designer's technical drawings and paint elevations, and with a crew of journeymen scenic artists, brings them to life on the actual scenery.

The charge artist is also responsible for the budgeting of the finished sets along with the production designer and the art director.

In the United States such individuals are typically members of the United Scenic Artists union.

== Notable scenic artists ==
- Sabrina Jones
- D. Dominick Lombardi
- Yuri Makoveychuk
- Roman Turovsky
- Michael Zansky
