= United Scenic Artists =

American entertainment industry labor union (founded 1897)

USA 829
- United Scenic Artists, Local USA 829, IATSE
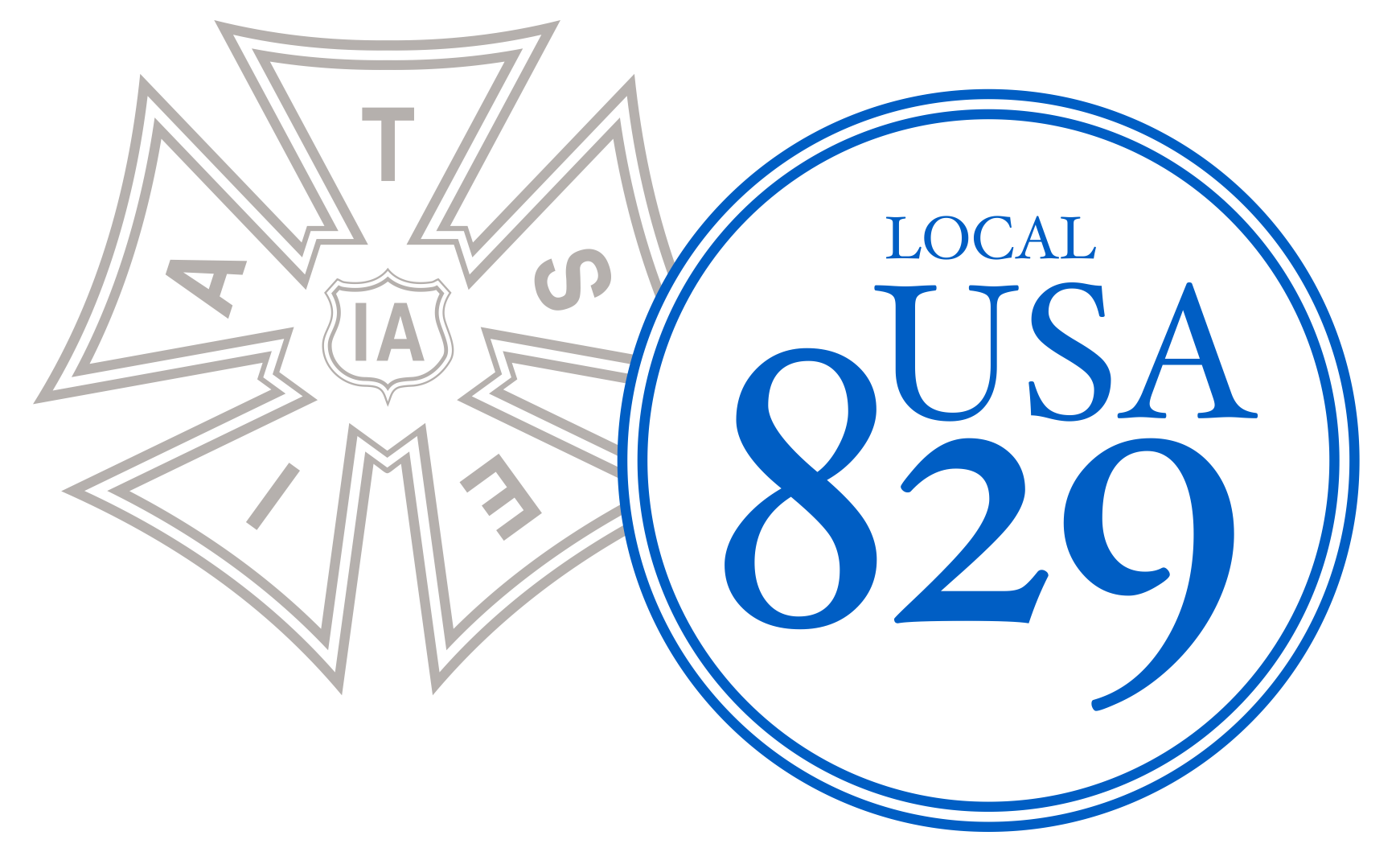
- Founded: 1897
- Headquarters: 37 W. 26th Street Fl. 9 New York, NY 10010
- Location: United States
- President: Edward Pierce
- Vice-President: Deirdra Govan
- Key people: Sandy Phillips, National Business Agent; Michael C. Smith, Financial Secretary; Joshua D. Reid, Corresponding Secretary
- Parent organization: International Alliance of Theatrical Stage Employees
- Affiliations: AFL-CIO
- Website: www.usa829.org
- Formerly called: United Scenic Artists of America

United Scenic Artists, Local USA 829, IATSE, formerly known as United Scenic Artists of America (USAA), is an American labor union. It is a nationwide autonomous local of the International Alliance of Theatrical Stage Employees. It organizes designers, artists, and craftspeople in the entertainment and decorative arts industries. The organization was part of International Brotherhood of Painters and Allied Trades, however it reaffiliated with IATSE in 1999. United Scenic Artists was organized to protect craft standards, working conditions and wages for the entertainment and decorative arts industries.

The members of Local USA 829 are artists and designers working in film, theatre, opera, ballet, television, industrial shows, commercials and exhibitions. The current membership totals over 5,000. Local USA 829 establishes wages for designers and artists, and negotiates with employers the best possible terms and conditions of employment, as well as health insurance and retirement benefits through employer contributions of pension, welfare, 401(k) and annuity plans.

Local USA 829 currently has many Collective Bargaining Agreements some of which include:

- National: League of Resident Theatres (LORT)
- Eastern Region: Broadway League, Off-Broadway League, Opera, Ballet, ABC, CBS, NBC; Scenery Suppliers in New York, Connecticut, Pennsylvania and Florida; Motion Pictures in New York, New England and Philadelphia; AICP Commercials.
- Central Region: Scenery Suppliers and theatre and opera and Scene Shops in Chicago and St. Louis; The Court and Victory Gardens Theatres, Chicago Opera Theatre, St. Louis MUNY, CBS, NBC.
- Western Region: The Los Angeles Opera and the San Francisco Opera; The Marin Theatre Company and the Magic Theatre; Seattle Children's Theatre.

== History ==
The union of Scenic Artists was founded in 1897 under the title "the United Scenic Artists Association", which was briefly a local of the IATSE. Eventually the AFL ruled that the local must leave the IATSE and join the painters union. The organization instead chose to be independent. This lasted until 1918 when jurisdictional encroachment forced an affiliation with the IBPAT. However, the Brotherhood was guaranteed complete autonomy in its historical and traditional jurisdiction.

On June 21, 1918, at their regular meeting at Geneva Hall in New York City, the Scenic Artists voted to accept a charter as United Scenic Artists of America (hence the USAA still seen in the union's logo) being Local 829, an autonomous local of the Brotherhood of Painters, Decorators and Paper Hangers of America. From that time on, Local 829 grew to include Scenic, Costume and Lighting Designers, Mural and Diorama Artists, Scenic Painters, Production Designers and Art Directors, Commercial Costume Stylists, Storyboard Artists and most recently Computer Artists, Art Department Coordinators, Sound Designers and Projection Designers working in all areas of the entertainment industry.

In 1983, a group of West Coast designers chose to affiliate with United Scenic Artists, and the Union opened a Los Angeles Regional office to serve them. In March 1990, a merger with IBPAT Local 350 in Chicago was effected and thereby jurisdiction was gained throughout the United States. Finally, on April 27 of 1999, after decades of suffering from a debilitating lack of common interest with the IBPAT, the membership of United Scenic Artists Local 829 voted by an overwhelming majority to re-affiliate with the International Alliance of Theatrical Stage Employees (IATSE) and to disaffiliate from the IBPAT. The vote reflected a belief that the IATSE, an entertainment union, would provide better representation for United Scenic Artists, who work in every type of theatrical, dance, motion picture, television, opera, and commercial production in the United States and around the world. At a special meeting of the IA's General Executive Board, United Scenic Artist's request for re-affiliation was unanimously approved and United Scenic Artists, Local USA 829, IATSE was born.

The members of IATSE Local USA 829 (so named because another Local 829 already existed in the IA) now enjoy full membership rights in the IATSE. In its hundred-ten-plus years of existence, the local has negotiated Agreements with major film studios, television networks, the Broadway League, the League of Resident Theatres (LORT), numerous scenery supply companies, opera companies, ballet companies, and numerous independent production companies.

== Membership ==
Local USA 829 currently admits members into the following Categories or Classifications of Membership:

- SCENIC ARTIST — Lay-out, surface decoration, sculpting, mold-making, casting and painting of scenery and properties for all media, plus the execution of models, miniatures, matte-shots and some graphics for motion pictures, commercials and television.
- SCENIC DESIGNER — Design, sketching, drafting, model building and supervision of scenery for all media. Film or television Art Directors & Production Designers are members of this category. Storyboard Artists are also accepted into the Scenic Design category, and are frequently hired as Assistant Art Directors.
- COSTUME DESIGNER — Design, selection, painting and dyeing of costumes for all media. Clothing Stylists and fashion coordinators who do styling for motion pictures, commercials and television would be accepted into this category.
- LIGHTING DESIGNER — Design and direction of lighting for all media except network television and motion pictures.
- SOUND DESIGNER — Create the aural environments in tandem with other design elements of the production, including the selection and implementation of sound effects and music.
- PROJECTION DESIGNER — Design of projections for all media. This is our newest category of membership, established in mid-2007.
- COMPUTER ARTIST — Recently created category to address the evolving visual needs of the entertainment industry.
- GRAPHIC ARTIST — This category covers graphic artists for television in the Midwest.
- ART DEPARTMENT COORDINATOR — Assists the Art Director and/or Production Designer by coordinating the schedule, staffing, budget-tracking and physical needs of the Art Department in film and television production.
- COSTUME DEPARTMENT COORDINATOR — Much like the Art Department Coordinator, the CDC assists the Costume Designer and members of the Costume Department by coordinating the schedule, staffing, purchases & returns, budget-tracking and physical needs of the Costume Department in film and television production.
- ALLIED CRAFTS — This category includes costume painters. No new members are being accepted into this category.
- INDUSTRIAL MEMBERS — A Classification rather than an artist category; their job is to assist the Scenic Artist in scenic shops, film and television studios and on locations. An Industrial Member might use the experience gained on the job in order to take one of the exams to become a journeyman Scenic Artist.

== Officers ==
Local Union Executive Board:

- President – Edward Pierce
- National Business Agent – Carl Mulert
- Vice-president – Deirdra Govan
- Financial Secretary – Michael C. Smith
- Corresponding Secretary – Hope Ardizzone
- Central Region Business Representative – Matt Walters
- Western Region Business Representative – Caitlin McConnell

== Notable members ==
=== Past ===
- Boris Aronson
- Marc Chagall
- Jo Mielziner
- Oliver Smith
- Franco Zeffirelli
- Irene Sharaff

=== Present ===
- Sabrina Jones
- D. Dominick Lombardi
- Yuri Makoveychuk
- Alina Panova
- George Tsypin
- Roman Turovsky
- Michael Zansky
- Beowulf Boritt
- Santo Loquasto
- Clint Ramos
- John Lee Beatty
- Scott Pask
- Paul Tazewell
- Tim Hatley
- Dane Laffrey
- David Zinn
- Kristi Zea
- Kalina Ivanov
- Patrizia von Brandenstein
- Judith Dolan
