= Massimo Marchese =

Italian musician (born 1965)

Massimo Marchese (born 31 August 1965 in Savona, Italy) is an Italian musician, lutenist, theorbist and recording artist.

== Biography ==
Born in Savona in the Italian region of Liguria, Marchese was a student of Jakob Lindberg at the Royal College of Music in London.

== Collaborations ==
He collaborated with the pipa player Jiao Xiangwen and the poet Sandro Boccardi He accompanied Nigel Rogers, Ottavio Dantone, Flavio Colusso, Flavio Emilio Scogna, and many ensemble as a Basso continuo musician.

He played in Europe, Asia and South America.

His recordings include the works of Francesco Spinacino, Franciscus Bossinensis, Joachim van den Hove, Robert de Visée, Gabriele Fallamero, and Roman Turovsky-Savchuk.

== Partial discography ==
- Roman Turovsky-Savchuk - "Dialogues with Time" (daVinci Edition C00028, 2017)
- Francesco Spinacino - Intavolatura di Leuto, Libri I e II (Tactus, 2006)
- Franciscus Bossinensis - Petrarca ed il cantare a Leuro (Tactus, 2007)
- The journeys of Rubens - Music from the courts of Europe (Centaur Records 2011)
- Virtuoso Vihuela music from Spain and Italy (Centaur records, 2013)
- Robert de Visee La musique de la chambre du Roi voll I, II and III (Brilliant Classics 2013)
- Joachim van den Hove - Florida (Brilliant Classics 2015)

== See also ==
- Lute
- Theorbo
- Vihuela
- Basso continuo
