= Chris Wilkes =

Chris Wilkes may refer to:

- Christopher Wilkes, American judge
- Kris Wilkes (born 1998), American basketball player

== See also ==
- Christopher Wilke, American composer, lutenist, guitarist, and teacher
