= Canadian Bandurist Capella =

Canadian musical ensemble

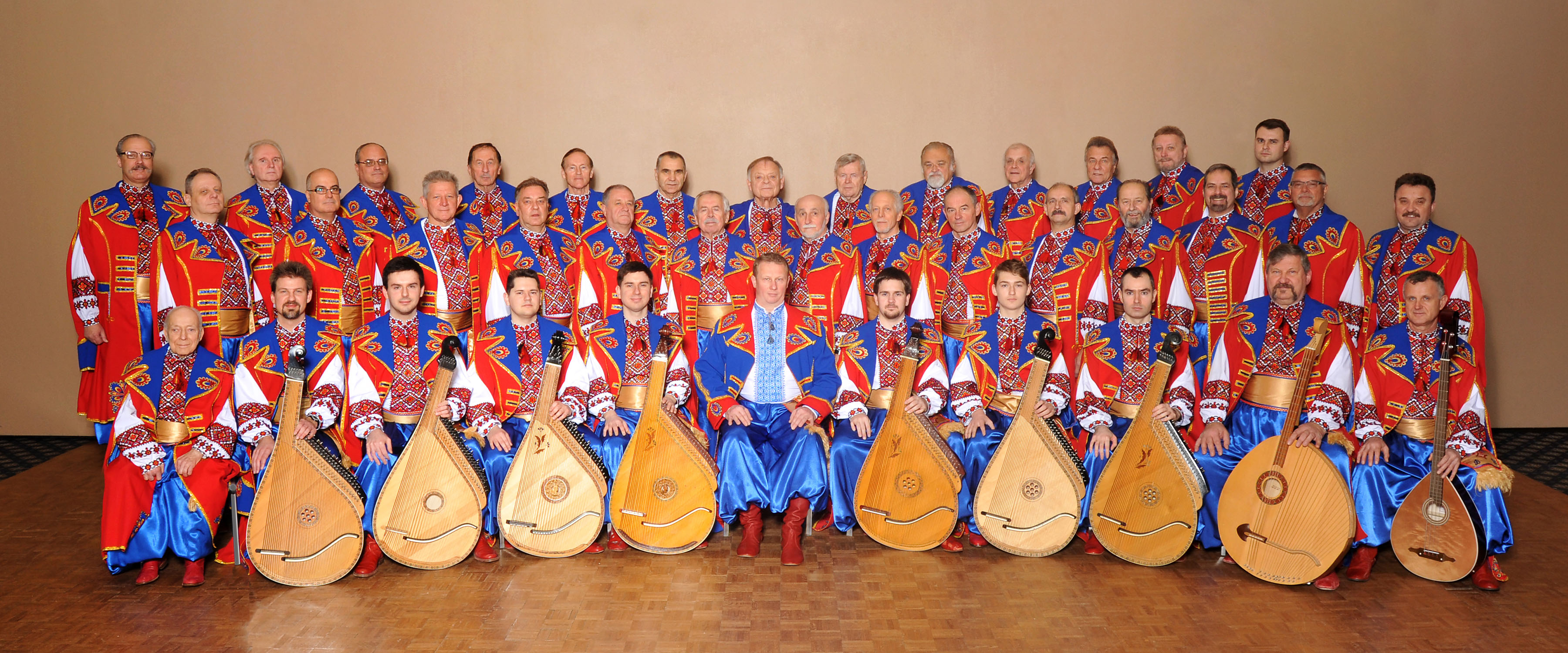
Canadian Bandurist Capella 2014

The Canadian Bandurist Capella (Ukrainian: Капеля Бандуристів Канади) is a vocal-instrumental ensemble that combines the sounds of male choral singing with the orchestral accompaniment of the multi-stringed Ukrainian bandura. Originally established as "Toronto Bandurist Capella" in 2001, the ensemble has been performing under the name "Canadian Bandurist Capella" since 2004. It is based in Toronto, Ontario, Canada.

== History ==
The ensemble was founded in 2001 as a male bandurist chorus under the name "Toronto Bandurist Capella". The original group was under the artistic direction of Victor Mishalow and included several instrumentalists from the Hryhory Kytasty Bandura Chorus, as well as choristers from various Ukrainian choirs in Toronto. The ensemble premiered at the Canadian National Exhibition on August 23, 2001, with 24 performers.

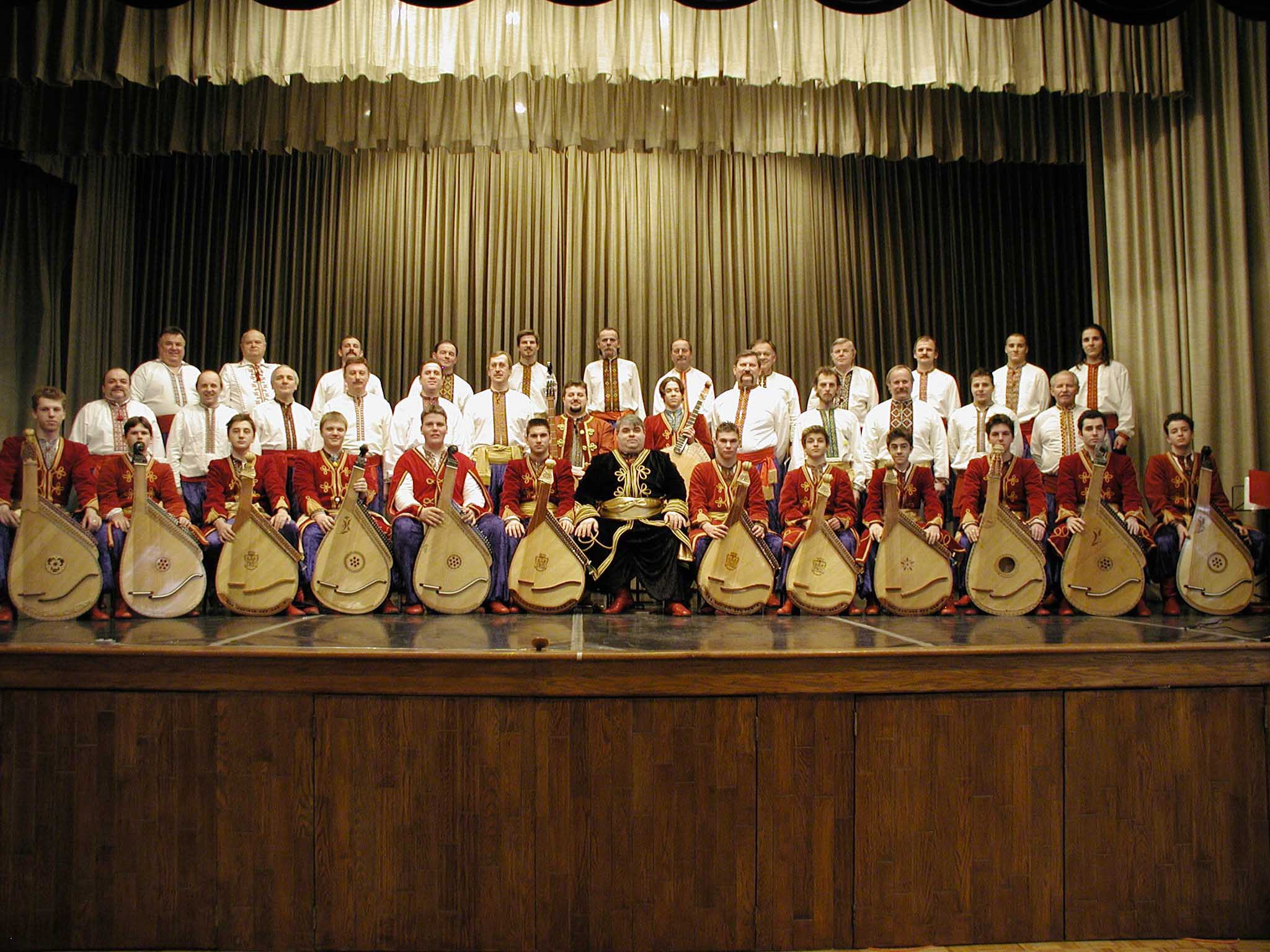
The Canadian Bandurist Capella 2003

The group incorporated in 2003. In 2004 the ensemble officially changed its name to "Canadian Bandurist Capella" and released its first self-titled CD in June 2004.

During the first years the group performed in various cities across Ontario. The Capella's first concert outside of Ontario was in Montreal on March 27, 2004.

On May 21, 2006 the ensemble performed in Chicago, marking its first international performance. Later that year the Capella made its first visit to the Canadian Prairies by performing in Winnipeg, and in Dauphin, Manitoba at Canada's National Ukrainian Festival.

The group released its second CD titled Грай Кобзарю! (Play Kobzar!) with renown guest soloist Pavlo Hunka in the spring of 2008.

In 2009, the ensemble embraced a "narrative performance style" that included musical numbers interspersed with stories and poems. This included programs such as "Слово Тараса" ("Word of Taras"), "Козацька Слава" ("Kozak Glory") and "Слава Героям УПА" ("Glory to Our Heroes UPA").

In 2013, Andriy Dmytrovych was appointed Artistic Director of the Capella. Under his direction, the group released its third CD (First Live Recording), In Memory of Those Who Lost Their Lives on the Maidan.

== Audio recordings ==
1. Canadian Bandurist Capella (2004) 14 tracks

2. Гpaй Кoбзapю! (Play Kobzar!) (2008) 12 tracks

3. In Memory of Those Who Lost Their Lives on the Maidan (2014) 12 tracks

4. Козацькому роду нема переводу (Kozaks Forever) (2017) 12 tracks

5. Коляда (Koliada) (2017) 13 tracks

== Artistic leadership ==
- Victor Mishalow (2001–2013) – Artistic Director
- Yurij Petlura (2013) – Conductor (Temporary. Other positions include: Concertmaster (2001–2013), Assistant conductor (2013–2014))
- Andriy Dmytrovych (2013–2017) – Artistic Director (Other positions include: Choirmaster and co-conductor (2004–2011))
- Julian Kytasty (2018–2019) – Musical Director
- Vasyl Turyanyn (2018–2024) – Conductor
- Pavlo Fondera (2019–Present) – Conductor (Other positions include: Guest Conductor (2017–2018), Choirmaster (2017–Present))

== Current direction ==
The current music director and conductor of the ensemble are Pavlo Fondera. Concertmaster is Ron Demeda.

== Chronology ==
- 2001 – Established as the "Toronto Bandurist Capella", under the artistic direction of Victor Mishalow
- 2001 – First performance on August 23, 2001 at the Canadian National Exhibition.
- 2001 – Elected the first board of directors in autumn of 2001.
- 2002 – First independent Christmas Concert in Oshawa, Ontario.
- 2003 – Incorporated under the name "Toronto Bandurist Capella" on May 27, 2003.
- 2004 – Changed its trade name to "Canadian Bandurist Capella".
- 2004 – Released its first CD, self-titled Canadian Bandurist Capella in June 2004.
- 2006 – First international concert in Chicago, Illinois, USA.
- 2008 – Released its second CD titled Гpaй Кoбзapю! (Play Kobzar!) featuring renown baritone/bass Pavlo Hunka in April 2008.
- 2009 – "Word of Taras" (Слово Тараса) concert tour (St.Catharines, Oshawa, Toronto).
- 2010 – In July 2010, helped re-establish the bandura program of the ODUM Music and Sports camp in London, Ontario.
- 2011 – Performed at the Shevchenko Monument unveiling in Ottawa, Ontario on June 26, 2011.
- 2012 – Glory to our Heroes (UPA) concerts (Toronto, Oshawa).
- 2013 – Yurij Petlura assumes the role of temporary Artistic Director in May 2013.
- 2013 – Andriy Dmytrovych appointed as Artistic Director in autumn 2013.
- 2014 – Performed at the "Gala Concert commemorating the 200th Anniversary of the birth of Taras Shevchenko" at Koerner Hall, Toronto, Ontario.
- 2014 – Performed at the "Canada and Ukraine Together" Benefit Concert at Hammerson Hall, Living Arts Centre, Mississauga, Ontario.
- 2015 – Released its third CD (First Live performance CD) In Memory of Those Who Lost Their Lives on the Maidan in January 2015.
- 2017 – Joint Christmas Concert together with the Ukrainian Bandurist Chorus titled - "Kobzar Christmas" on January 22, 2017 in Toronto, ON.
- 2018 - Joint Christmas Concerts together with the Women's Bandura Ensemble of North America in December 2018 in St. Catharines and Toronto.
- 2017 – Released its fourth CD (3rd Studio Recording) titled Козацькому роду нема переводу (Kozaks Forever) in September 2017.
- 2019 - "Crossroads" concert tour in May 2019 under the musical director Julian Kytasty, where the Capella performed across cities in Alberta, Saskatchewan, Manitoba, and Ontario.
- 2022 - "Stand With Ukraine" concert series in support of Ukraine in November 2022 in Hamilton, Kitchener and Toronto.
- 2024 - "Word of Taras" concert series in honour of 210 years since the birth of Taras Shevchenko in March 2024 in St. Catharines, Toronto, Montreal, and Ottawa.

== Sources ==
- Мішалов, В. "Кобзарська спадщина Гната Хоткевича у діаспорі" // Традиції і сучасне в українській культурі /Тези доповідей Міжнародної науково-практичної конференції, присвяченої 125-річчю Гната Хоткевича/ X.: 2002. - С.97-98
- Мішалов, В. – Бандура в еміграційних центрах у міжвоєнний період (с.95-103) – Karpacki Collage Artystyczny – Biuletyn – Przemysl, 2005
- "Canadian Bandurist Capella: About Us".
- "Canadian Bandurist Capella: Historical Highlights".
- "Canadian Bandurist Capella: Upcoming Events".
- "Canadian Bandurist Capella: Recording".
- "Yevshan: Benefit Concert Live Performance 2014".
