= Victor Mishalow =

Australian-Canadian bandurist (born 1960)

Victor Mishalow Віктор Мішалов
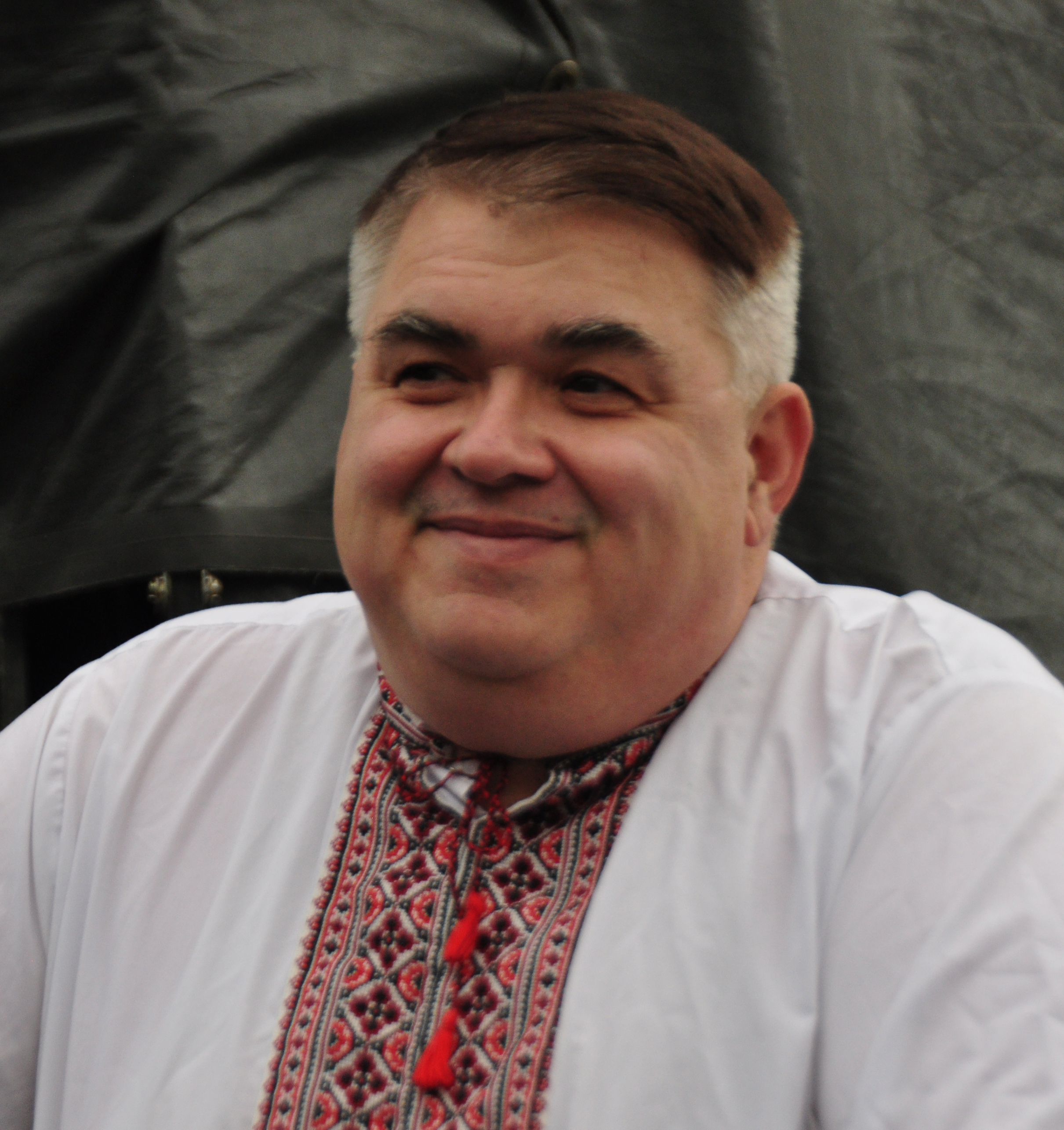

Background information
- Born: 4 April 1960 (age 66); Sydney, Australia
- Genres: Folk, Classical
- Occupations: Composer, bandurist, musicologist, conductor, pedagogue
- Instrument: Bandura
- Years active: 1974–

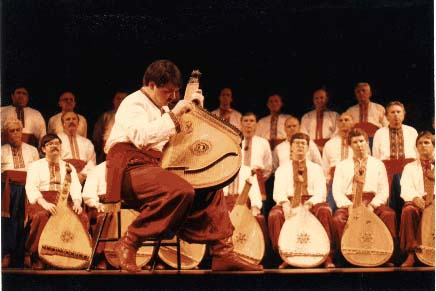
V. Mishalow performing with the Ukrainian Bandurist Chorus.

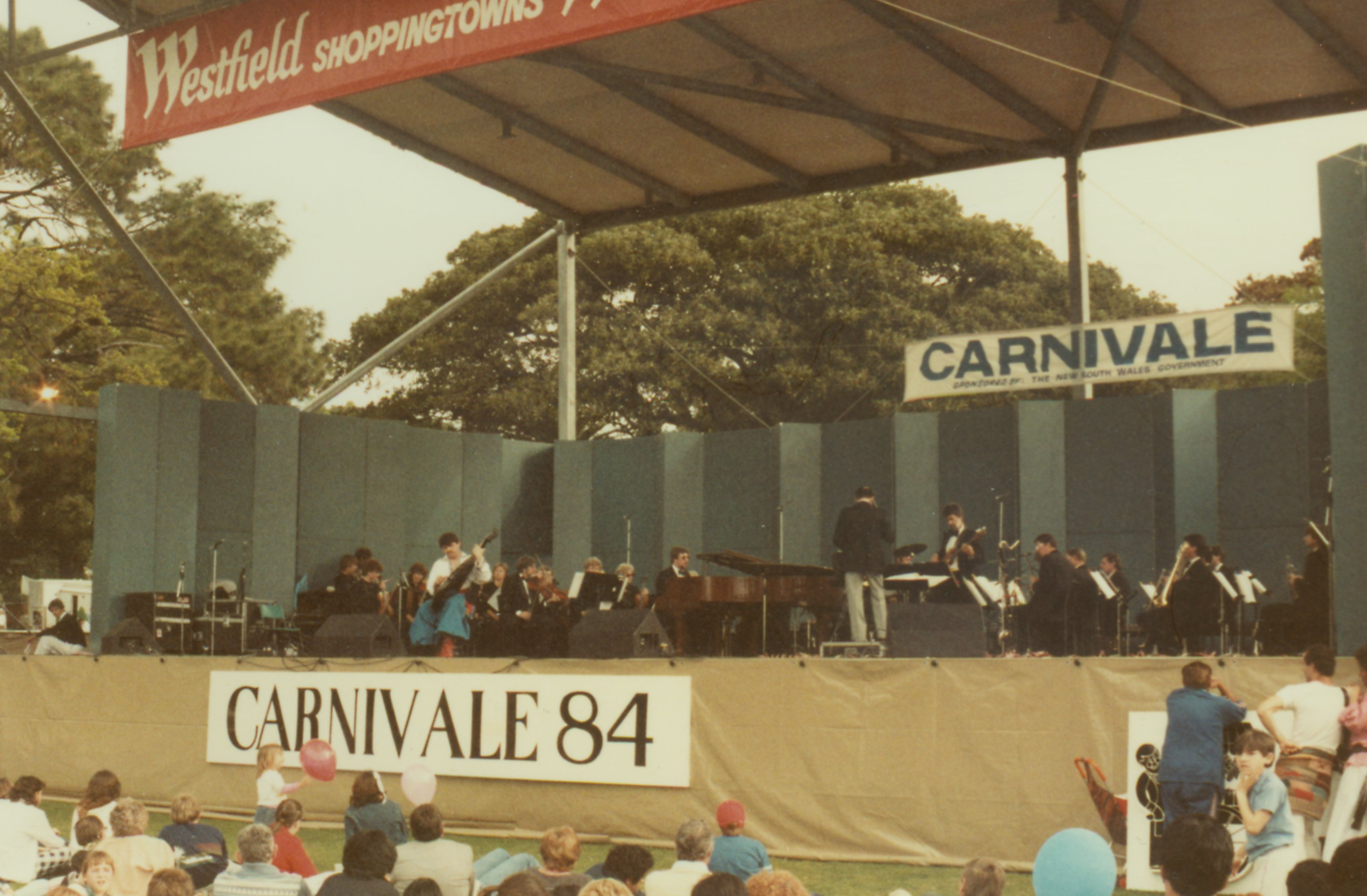
V. Mishalow performing with the Sydney International Orchestra under the direction of Tommy Tycho.

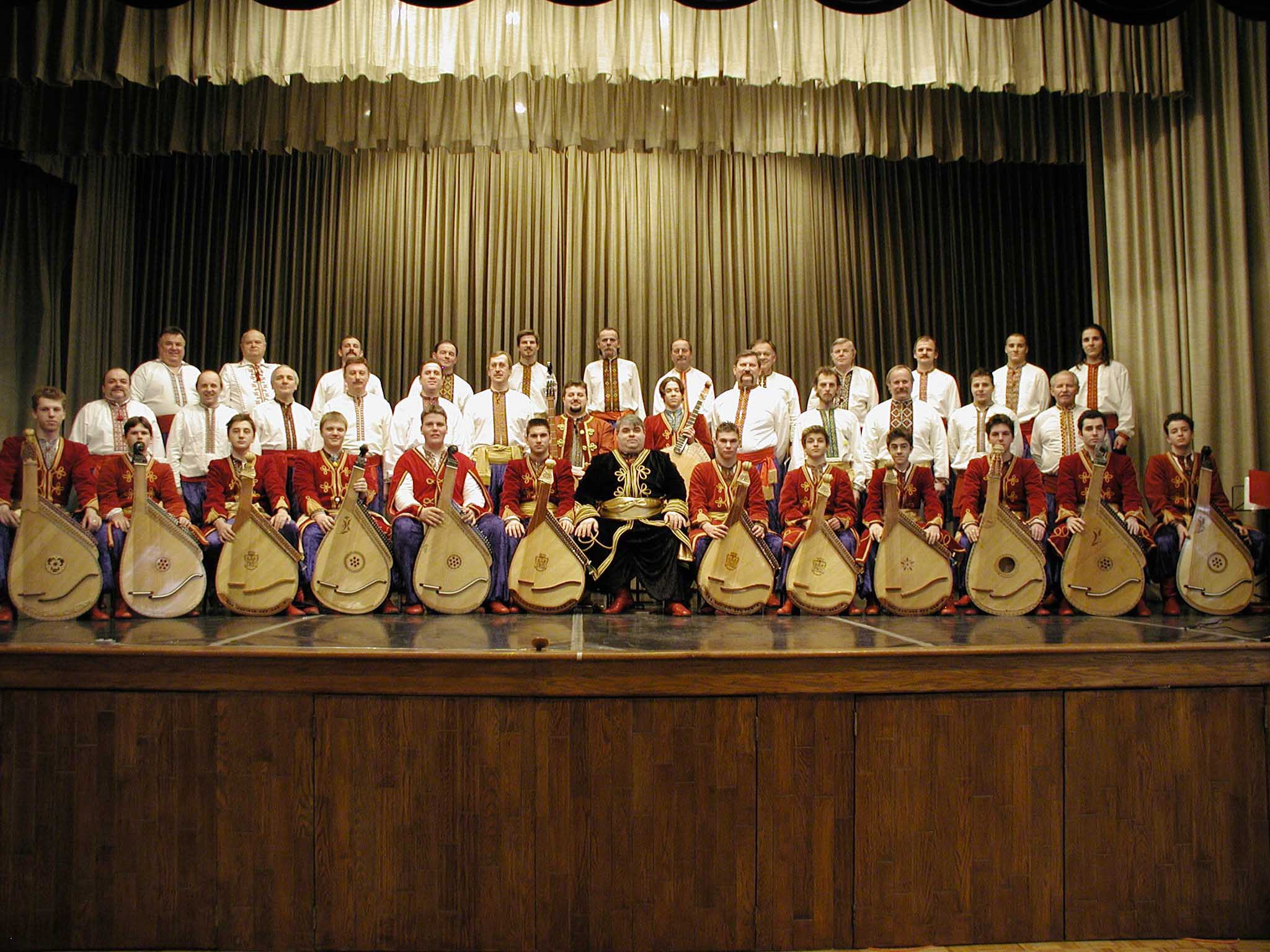
V. Mishalow and the Canadian Bandurist Capella.

Victor Yuriiovych Mishalow (Note: Ukrainian: Віктор Юрійович Мішалов, romanized: Viktor Yuriiovych Mishalov) (born 4 April 1960) is an Australian-born Canadian bandurist, educator, composer, conductor, and musicologist.

== Biography ==
Victor Mishalow was born on 4 April 1960, in Sydney, Australia, Mishalow began studying the bandura in 1970 initially with Peter Deriashnyj, playing in the Hnat Khotkevych Ukrainian Bandurist Ensemble and from 1974 with Hryhory Bazhul in Sydney. He was the first person in Australia to do their practical HSC music performance exam at Carlingford High School on the bandura.

In 1978 he received grants and scholarships from the Australia Council for the Arts and the NSW Premier's Department to undertake advanced studies in bandura in North America where he studied under Peter Honcharenko, Peter Kytasty, Hryhory Kytasty, Vasyl Yemetz and Leonid Haydamaka.

In 1979 he received a scholarship to attend the Kyiv Conservatory where he studied bandura under Professor Serhiy Bashtan, conducting under Professor Mykola Shchohol, and voice under Professor Maryna Yehorychev.

While in Kyiv he also attended evening classes at Kyiv University and privately studied traditional kobzar artistry under Heorhy Tkachenko.

Returning to Australia, Mishalow established various bandura trios and ensembles, and organising seminars in Adelaide, Melbourne, Canberra and Sydney. He graduated from Sydney University in 1984 with a double major in Musicology and Ethno-musicology, continuing post-graduate studies at the Sydney College of Advanced Education (1986) (Dip.Ed.) in music education, and then the Kyiv Conservatory (1988) (M.Mus.). In February 2009 he successfully defended his Candidate of Science (PhD-equivalent) dissertation on the "Cultural and artistic aspects of the genesis and development of performance on the Kharkiv bandura" at the Kharkiv State Academy of Culture. His opponents were Dr Igor Matsiyevsky from the Saint Petersburg Conservatory and Dr Mykola Davydov from the Kyiv Conservatory.

Mishalow has performed widely throughout Australia, North America and Europe. He has been associated with a variety of artists, and artistic groups such as the Tommy Tycho International Orchestra, the Toronto Symphony Orchestra and Orchestra Toronto, the Sydney Theatre Company, the Ukrainian Bandurist Chorus and numerous dance companies. His music has been aired in Australia on ABC Radio and non-commercial stations.

In 1988 he settled in Toronto, Ontario, Canada where he teaches bandura in musical schools, while also touring and performing as a soloist-instrumentalist. In 1991 he founded the Canadian Bandurist Capella

In 2013 he became an Adjunct Research Fellow at Monash University, Melbourne, Australia.

== Awards ==
Victor Mishalow received the Australian Composers Fellowship Award from the Australia Arts Council in 1986. Victor Mishalow was awarded the title of Merited Artist of Ukraine by Ukrainian president Leonid Kuchma in October 1999. In August 2009 he was awarded the Order of Merit 3rd class, by Ukrainian president Viktor Yushchenko and the Medal of "Cossack Glory" from the Hetman of the Ukrainian Cossacks for his services to Ukrainian musical culture.

== Recordings ==
=== Solo ===
- 1982 – Bandura – Yevshan YFP 1017
- 1985 – Bandura 2 – Yevshan YFP 1035
- 1986 – The Classical Bandura – Freefall Free-002
- 1988 – Cossack songs of the 17-18th century – Yevshan 1050
- 1989 – The Classical Bandura – Yevshan
- 1990 – The Best of Bandura – Yevshan 1070
- 1997 – Bandura Magic – Yevshan 1153
- 1998 – Bandura Christmas Magic – Yevshan 1154

=== Compilations ===
- 1983 – The Huldre Folk
- 1984 – The Huldre Folk – Adelaide Folk Festival
- 1984 – The Huldre Folk – In concert
- 1985 – Victor and Yuri – The Huldre Folk
- 1985 – True Believers (with Paul Hemphill) – Freefall
- 1986 – Victor and Yuri in Concert at the National Folk Festival
- 1987 – The Drover's Dog (with Paul Hemphill) – Freefall
- 1988 – The NorthWest Folklife Festival – Volume 10
- 1988 – The Huldrefolk Live in London
- 1991 – 20 years of Folklife CD (Seattle, USA)
- 1993 – Other Worlds – The Ukrainian Bandura – Jack Straw Productions JSPOW3
- 1996 – V. Kikta – Oratorio "Sacred Dnipro" (with Toronto Symphony Orchestra and Canadian-Ukrainian Opera Chorus).
- 1999 – A Union of Strings CD – (Toronto, Ontario, Canada)
- 2001 – Strings of Soul – Canadian Bandura Foundation
- 2002 – Under the Skin (with Maia Kuze) – SMK Productions, SMKCD-0004

=== Videos ===
- 2001 – Playing the Bandura – Yevshan YV 201

=== Film music ===
- 1988 – Kobzar Viktor Mishalow (Kyiv television documentary films)
- 1990 – Sledovat' na sever mozhet (Director Stanislav Klymenko)
- 1998 – Millennium (Dir: H. Kuchmiy) national Film Board
- 2001 – Strings of Soul (Canadian Bandura Foundation)
- 2005 – Chervonyj Renaizan
- 2009 – William Vetzal – Bandura maker
- 2012 – She Paid the Ultimate Price
- 2014 – Strings of Survival
- 2014 – The Babas of Chernobyl

== Compositions ==
=== Classical works ===
- String trio (1977)
- String quartet (1983)
- Sonata (v-ln & piano) (1984)
- Sonata (piano) (1984)
- Rhapsody on Ukrainian folk themes (sym. orchestra) (1985)
- Slavonic Dance (sym. orchestra) (1986)
- Bandura concerto (3 movements) (1998)
- Elegy for William (String trio) (2007)
- Ukrainian Christmas Fantasy (sym. orchestra) (2014)

=== For bandura solo ===
- Spring song (1977)
- Ukrainian rhapsody (1981)
- Crimean fantasy (1983)
- 24 etudes for the Kharkiv bandura (1984)
- Carpathian rhapsody (1988)
- Christmas fantasy (1991)
- The Bakhchisarai Fountain (1998)
- Folk-song variation sets («Взяв би я бандуру», «Ой не ходи Грицю», «Waltzing Matilda», «Greensleeves», «Гайдук»).

=== Vocal ===
Numerous vocal and choral works.

== Selected articles ==
- Мішалов В. Традиція, трансформація та інновація в бандурному виконавстві української діаспори Австралії // Вісник Київського національного університету культури і мистецтв – Серія: Музичне мистецтво К. 2019. (ст. 163 – 174)
- Mishalow V. Tradition, Transformation and Innovation in Bandura Playing in the Ukrainian Diaspora of Australia // Вісник Київського національного університету культури і мистецтв – Серія: Музичне мистецтво К. 2019. (ст. 163 – 174)
- Mishalow V. Tradition and Innovation in the Bandura performances of Vasyl Yemetz // Вісник Київського національного університету культури і мистецтв — Серія: Музичне мистецтво К. 2020. (ст. 59–71)
- Мішалов В. Спогади про зустрічі з бандуристом Василем Ємцем // Синергія виконавця і слухача в кобзарсько-лірницькій традиції – Збірник наукових праць науково-практичної з міжнародною участю. (Київ – Харків, 6 червня 2019 року.) К., НЦНК «Музей Івана Гончара». Х. 2020. (ст. 136–145)
- Mishalow V. Tradition and Innovation in the Bandura performances of Vasyl Yemetz. // Синергія виконавця і слухача в кобзарсько-лірницькій традиції – Збірник наукових праць науково-практичної з міжнародною участю. (Київ – Харків, 6 червня 2019 року.) К., НЦНК «Музей Івана Гончара». Х. 2020. (ст. 146–156)
- Мішалов Віктор До пошуків колиски феномену кобзарства // ХІ. Internationale virtuelle Konferenz der Ukrainistik «Dialog der Sprachen — Dialog der Kulturen. Die Ukraine aus globaler Sicht» Reihe: Internationale virtuelle Konferenz der Ukrainistik. Bd. 2020. Herausgegeben von Olena Novikova und Ulrich Schweier. Verlag readbox unipress Open Access LMU, Munich, 2021. (с.604-627)
- Мішалов Віктор Виконавські реконструкції бандурних транскрипцій Філарета Колесси: Теоритичні та Практичні Засади ст 61-77 // Проблеми кобзарознавства та етноінструментології. Матеріяли науково-практичної конференції 1-го Міжнародного з'їзду кобзарознавців та етноорганологів ім. М. Будника (Ірпінь, 13-14 жовтня 2021 р) у 2 кни. Кн 1. 408 с.
- Мішалов Віктор Кобза та бандура, кобзарі та бандуристи як знаки української культури // XII. Internationale virtuelle Konferenz der Ukrainistik "Dialog der Sprachen - Dialog der Kulturen. Die Ukraine aus globaler Sicht" Reihe: Internationale virtuelle Konferenz der Ukrainistik. Bd. 2021. Herausgegeben von Olena Novikova und Ulrich Schweier. Georg Olms Verlag - UB Ludwig-Maximilians-Universität München, Munich 2022. ISBN 978-3-487-16305-5 (print) ISSN 2629-5016 (print) ISSN 2629-5024 (online)
- Мішалов Віктор Марко Мішалов - учень Михайла Злобинця. Спогади. с.77-84 // Просвітник та бандурист Михайло Злобинець / авт. уклад. О. Силка, В. Козоріз - Харків, Видавець Олександр Савчук. 2023 с.192
- Мішалов В. Ю. Народна бандура. Виконавська майстерність (Закінчення) с.7-230 // Формування національних основоположних підстав сучасного українського народознавства та літературознавства. Колективна монографія Вип. 4. / Упорядники Олексій Вертій, Олена Новікова - РУТА, Київ, Munich 2023. 436 с.

== Books ==
- Mizynec V. – Folk Instruments of Ukraine – Bayda Books, Melbourne, Australia, 1987 – 48с.
- Мішалов В. – Видатний будівничий бандурного мистецтва – Гнат Хоткевич – Сідней, Австралія, 1983 – 68с.
- Мішалов В. і М. – Українські кобзарі-бандуристи – Сідней, Австралія, 1986 – 106с.
- Мішалов В. – Збірник творів для харківської бандури N.Y: TUB, 1986 – 48с.
- Mishalow V. – Collection of works for Kharkiv Bandura – Society of Ukrainian Bandurists, NY, USA, 1986 – 48с.
- Хоткевич Гнат "Підручник гри на бандурі" // Глас, Х.:2004 – С.3-17
- Гнат Хоткевич – «Бандура та її можливості» Вип. 1 // Глас, Х.:2007 – С.92
- Гнат Хоткевич – «Твори для Харківської бандури» Вип. 2 // Глас, Х.:2007 – С.254
- Гнат Хоткевич – «Бандура та її репертуар» Вип. 3 // Харків: Фонд національно-культурних ініціатив імені Гната Хоткевича, 2009 — С.268
- Мішалов В. (ред. упорядник та передмова) Г. М. Хоткевича – Вибрані твори для бандури Вип. 4. // Фонд національно-культурних ініціатив імені Гната Хоткевича Торонто-Харків: 2010. 112 С.
- Гнат Хоткевич — «Бандура та її конструкція» Вип. 5// Харків: Фонд національно-культурних ініціатив імені Гната Хоткевича, 2010 — С.289.
- Мішалов Віктор – «Харківська бандура» // видавець О. Савчук, Х.:2013 – С.352
- Мішалов Віктор - Народна бандура: витоки, будова, особливості становлення // Формування національних основоположних підстав сучасного народознавства та літературознавства – Колективна монографія Випуск ІІІ / Упорядник О. Вертій Київ – Мюнхен, Рута 2023 с. 42 - 106

== External links and resources ==
- Mishalow, Victor (2013), Victor Mishalow interviewed by Rob Willis in the Rob Willis folklore collection
- Mishalow, Victor. "Folk Instruments of Ukraine". Archived from the original on 3 July 2009.

== Bibliography ==
- Кравченко, П. "Віктор Мішалов – бандурист" ("Victor Mishalow – bandurist"), Альманах українського життя в Австралії ("Almanac of Ukrainian Life in Australia". (pp 892–894) "The Free Thought", Sydney, 1994. ISBN 0-908168-04-7 (Ukrainian)
- Литвин, М. 'Струни золотії' ("Golden strings"), Веселка, Kyiv: 1994 (Ukrainian)
- Markus V. (ed) Encyclopedia of the Ukrainian Diaspora Vol 4. (Australia-Asia-Africa) Австралія-Азія-Африка) Shevchenko Scientific Society and the National Academy of Sciences of Ukraine, Kyiv—New York—Chicago—Melbourne, p. 40 1995 ISBN 5-7702-1069-9 (Ukrainian)
- Австралийский музыкант Виктор Мишалов
