= Van den Hove =

van den Hove is a Dutch surname. Notable people with the surname include:

- Joachim van den Hove (1567?–1620), Flemish composer
- Martin van den Hove (1605–1639), Dutch astronomer and mathematician
