= Rob MacKillop =

Scottish musician and instrumentalist

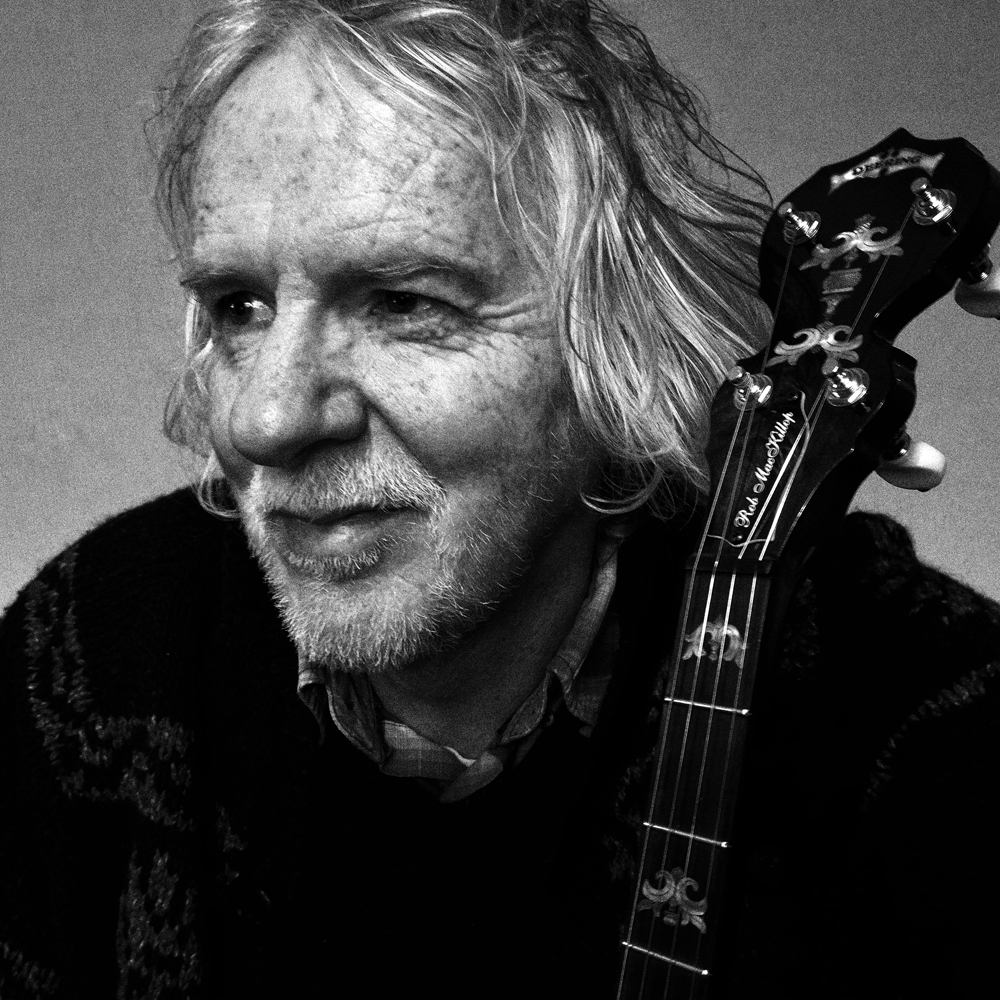
Rob MacKillop with Deering Banjo in 2013

Rob MacKillop (born 1959) is a Scottish musician and multi-instrumentalist, specializing in lute, theorbo, vihuela, historical banjo, ukulele and classical guitar. He has been described as “the godfather of modern no-nail playing," meaning that he plays classical guitar without the use of the right-hand finger nails. He is an important performer of Early Music in Scotland, a recording artist, and author of over twenty-five editions of music by Mel Bay and other publishers (see below). He is also a fine-art photographer.

== Biography ==
Rob MacKillop was born in Dundee, Scotland. After a youthful period of playing the ukulele, MacKillop started teaching himself guitar as a teenager, playing along to records of Muddy Waters and Johnny Winter. After a period exploring punk and free-improvisation, MacKillop went on to study classical guitar at Napier College, Edinburgh (now Napier University) in 1987, becoming a Lecturer there the following academic year, followed by four years at the Royal Scottish Academy of Music and Drama, Glasgow, where he also became a lecturer in Guitar and Lute immediately after graduating in 1993. He eventually resigned from institutional teaching, preferring to teach online via his own studio.

In 2001, MacKillop was awarded a Churchill Fellowship for his research into medieval Scottish music. He was appointed as Musician in Residence for Madras College, St Andrews in 2001 and Composer in Residence for Morgan Academy in Dundee in 2004, in which year he also organized and directed the Dundee Festival of Summer Music. He was later also Musician In Residence at Queen Margaret University, Musselburgh near Edinburgh for five years. In 2011, he co-founded (with Bill Samson) the Scottish Lute and Early Guitar Society.

== Family ==
MacKillop's wife, Susan Rennie, is a lexicographer, author and Scots translator.

== Academic Papers ==
- 'The Scottish Contribution to the 18th-century Wire-strung Guittar', in Manuel Morais and Rui Vieira Nery eds, A guitarra portuguesa: actas do simposio internacional, Universidade de Evora, 7-9 setembro 2001, (Lisbon, Estar: Universidade de Evora, Centro de Historia da Arte, 2002), pp. 37–82.
- ‘The Guitar, Cittern and Guittar in Scotland: an historical introduction up to 1800’, in Monika Lustig, ed., Michaelsteiner Konferenzberichte Band 66: Gitarre und Zister-Bauweise, Spieltechnik und Geschichte bis 1800 (Michaelstein: Stifung Kloster Michaelstein und Verlag Janos Stekovics, 2004), pp. 121–48.
- ‘For kissing for loving, for proveing: performance practice and modern interpretation of the lute repertoire’, in James Porter ed., Defining Strains: The Musical Life of Scots in the Seventeenth Century. Studies in the History and Culture of Scotland, vol. 2. (Oxford: Peter Lang, 2007).

== Discography ==
MacKillop has recorded numerous CDs of music for various early plucked instruments, three of which reached the Number One position in the Scottish Classical Music Chart.

- Notes of Noy, Notes of Joy - The Rowallan Consort. Scottish music of the 16th and 17th centuries. Lute (Robert Phillips [Rob MacKillop]), clarsach, (William Taylor), voice, (Paul Rendall and Mhairi Lawson). Temple Records, 1995. COMD 2058.
- Graysteil: Music from the Middle Ages and Renaissance In Scotland - Rob MacKillop, lute, William Taylor harp and clarsach, Paul Rendall (tenor voice) Andrew Hunter (traditional music singer). Dorian Records, 1997. Dorian Discoveries DIS 80141.
- Flowers of the Forest - Scottish lute, cittern and guitar music. Greentrax Recordings, 1998. CDTRAX155.
- Plucked Instruments in the Edinburgh University Collection of Historical Musical Instruments, played by Rob MacKillop. Baroque guitar, French, mid-18th century; 9 course lute, labelled Matteus Buchenberg; 19th-century guitar by Louis Panormo, 19th-century guitar by C. F. Martin. 1999. EUCHMICD101.
- James Oswald, Twelve Divertimentis for the Guittar (1759) - ASV Gaudeamus CD GAU 2001. Premier recording of the complete divertimenti for the guitar by James Oswald, performed on an original wire-strung guitar from c.1765.
- The Songs of Alexander Montgomerie, Poet to James VI of Scotland. Paul Rendall, tenor, Rob MacKillop lute and mandour. ASV Gaudeamus CD, 2002. GAU249.
- The Healing - Scottish lute, cittern and guitar music. Greentrax Recordings, 2002. CDTRAX227.
- Love Is The Cause: Scottish Tunes for Viola da gamba and baroque Guitar, Jonathan Dunford, gamba, and Rob MacKillop, baroque guitar. Arrangements from Scottish manuscripts. Alpha 530. 2009.
- Fernando Sor - the Art of the 19th-century Guitar, Volume 1 - Selected Studies. RMmusic 2012.
- The Early American Parlour Banjo - Rob MacKillop, gut-strung banjo.
- Recital: The Art of the Banjo 1910 - 1930. RMmusic, 2012.
- The Romantic Spanish Guitar - music by Fernando Sor, José Brocà, Julian Arcas, José Viñas y Diaz, Jaime Bosch, José Ferrer, Federico Cano, Luis Soria, Rafael Marin, Francisco Tárrega, and Miquel Llobet.
- Giovanni Paolo Foscarini - Complete Works for Baroque Guitar in the Lute Style. Aventino Music, Italy, 2025.

== Compositions written for and/or dedicated to Rob MacKillop ==
- Esi es la Vida (Homage to Lorca) for flute and classical guitar, G. P. Cribari, 1992
- Fountain of Tears (Homage on the Death of Lorca), for flute and classical guitar, Edward McGuire, 1992
- The Oud Player of Rosslyn for Turkish Oud, Edward McGuire, 2001
- The Rosslyn Oud for 12c lute, John Maxwell Geddes, 2001
- The Old Composer Remembers for Renaissance lute, John Purser, 2001
- Cantio Sarmatica CXI for lute, Roman Turovsky, 2005
- Rob’s Dream for classical guitar, Christian Vasseur, November 2015
- Manfred Suite, Opus 5, Gordon Ferries, 2018
- Skårv for guitar (classical or acoustic archtop guitar), Mårten Falk, April 2018
- Form A, scordatura guitar: E Bb G D Ab Eb, Mårten Falk, April–May, 2018
- Twelve Studies for Bass Guitar, Gilbert Isbin, 2018
- Two Canticles for classical guitar, Steven Watson, July 2022
- 12 Easy Studies for 10-String Guitar in Yepes Tuning, Gilbert Isbin, 2023
- 12 Pieces for 10-string Guitar in Yepes Tuning, Gilbert Isbin, 2023
- Earth Abandoned, baroque lute, Mårten Falk, February, 2023
- Nightfall for 5-string banjo, Steven Watson, April 2023
- As breath into the wind for guitar, Steven Watson, May 2023
- Prelude for 5-string banjo, Steven Watson, May 2023
- Waves for 5-string banjo, Steven Watson, June 2023
- Dawnlight for tenor banjo, Steven Watson, November 2023
- Due Studi for classical guitar, Ulisse Mazzagatti, December 2023
- Quattro Composizioni d’Estate for classical guitar, Ulisse Mazzagatti, December 2023
- Notturni for classical guitar, Ulisse Mazzagatti, December 2023
- Prelude No.1 from Death By Water [from The Waste Land IV] for guitar, Gordon Ferries, March 2024

== Bibliography ==
MacKillop is an author of many didactic music scores published by Mel Bay.

- 24 Pieces for Guitar by Gilbert Isbin - edited and recorded by Rob MacKillop. Mel Bay Publications MB30660M
- Classical and Contemporary Studies for Bass Guitar - arranged and edited by Rob MacKillop Mel Bay Publications MB30676M
- Tunes from 17th-century Scotland for mandolin - arranged and recorded by Rob MacKillop. Mel Bay Publications MB30679M
- Easy Classical Mandolin Tunes for Kids - arranged and recorded by Rob MacKillop. Mel Bay Publications MB30680M
- Easy Popular Mandolin Tunes for Kids - arranged and recorded by Rob MacKillop. Mel Bay Publications MB30681M
- DADGAD Easy Christmas Favourites - arranged and recorded by Rob MacKillop. Mel Bay Publications MB30644M
- DADGAD Ragtime and Early Jazz - arranged and recorded by Rob MacKillop. Mel Bay Publications MB30568M
- DADGAD Old-Time, Flatpicking and Bluegrass - arranged and recorded by Rob MacKillop. Mel Bay Publications MB30567M
- Introduction to the Lute - for lute and guitar players - arranged and recorded by Rob MacKillop. Mel Bay Publications MB30589M
- 20 Progressive Fingerstyle Studies for Uke - arranged and recorded by Rob MacKillop. Mel Bay Publications MB22126M
- Easy DADGAD Classics for Acoustic Guitar - arranged and recorded by Rob MacKillop. Mel Bay Publications MB30545M
- DADGAD Blues - arranged and recorded by Rob MacKillop. Mel Bay Publications MB30544M
- 20 Pieces from Briggs’ Banjo Instructor arranged for Ukulele - arranged and recorded by Rob MacKillop. Mel Bay Publications MB22127M
- Early Irish-American Banjo - arranged and recorded by Rob MacKillop. Mel Bay Publications MB22173M
- Bach’s Cello Suites I-III arranged for Tenor Banjo - arranged and recorded by Rob MacKillop. Mel Bay Publications MB30430M
- Early American Classics for Banjo - arranged and recorded by Rob MacKillop. Mel Bay Publications MB22172M
- The Bach Uke Book - duets for two ukuleles, one in gCEA tuning, the other a baritone in DGBE tuning - arranged and recorded by Rob MacKillop, ukulele, and Gordon Ferries (guitar). Mel Bay Publications MB30024M
- Easy DADGAD Celtic Guitar - arranged and recorded by Rob MacKillop. Mel Bay Publications MB30543M
- 20 Old-Time American Tunes arranged for Ukulele - arranged and recorded by Rob MacKillop. Mel Bay Publications MB30037M
- 20 Easy Classical Uke Pieces for Kids - arranged and recorded by Rob MacKillop. Mel Bay Publications MB30429M
- 20 Spanish Baroque Pieces by Gaspar Sanz arranged for Ukulele - arranged and recorded by Rob MacKillop. Mel Bay Publications MB22128M
- 20 Popular Uke Tunes for Kids - arranged and recorded by Rob MacKillop. Mel Bay Publications MB30431M
- 20 Easy Fingerstyle Studies - arranged and recorded by Rob MacKillop. Mel Bay Publications MB30025M
- 20 Celtic Fingerstyle Uke Tunes - arranged and recorded by Rob MacKillop. Mel Bay Publications MB22129M
- Sonatas of the Scottish Enlightenment - arranged for fingerstyle/classical guitar, by Rob MacKillop. Mel Bay Publications, 2001.
- Music for the Lute in Scotland, by Robert Phillips [Rob MacKillop]. Kinmor Music, 1995. ISBN 0951120476.
- Scottish Traditional Music For Guitar in DADGAD and Open G Tunings, by Rob MacKillop. Edinburgh: Hardie Press, 1999. ISBN 9780946868230.
- The Scottish Guitar: 40 Scottish Tunes for Fingerstyle Guitar, arranged and recorded by Rob MacKillop. Centerstream Publications, 2011. ISBN 9781574242652.
