= Shevchenko State Art School =

Fine arts gymnasium school in Kyiv, Ukraine

Taras Shevchenko State Art School
- Ukrainian: Державна художня середня школа ім. Тараса Шевченка
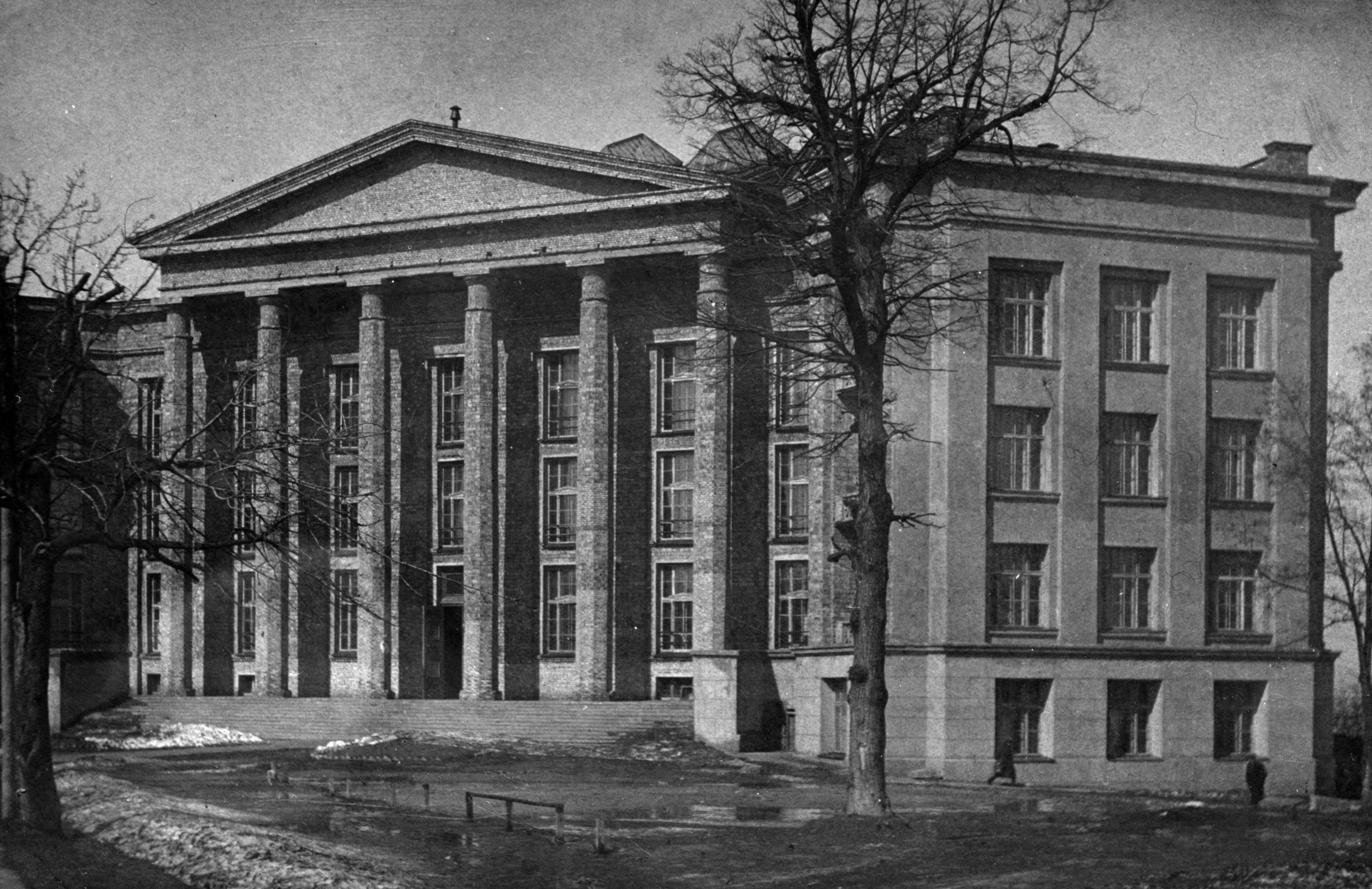
- Shevchenko State Art School at 2 Volodymyrska Street, Kyiv in 1940

Location
- 4 Zhambyla Zhabajeva St; Kyiv; Ukraine
- Coordinates: 50°28′01″N 30°26′00″E

Information
- Type: Selective fine arts gymnasium school
- Established: 12 August 1937; 88 years ago
- Grades: 5-12
- Website: dergartschool.kiev.ua

Taras Shevchenko State Art School (Ukrainian: Державна художня середня школа імені Тараса Шевченка) is a selective gymnasium school specializing in fine arts (painting, sculpture and architecture), in Kyiv, Ukraine. The school is part of the complex that also includes schools of ballet and music. It is located adjoining a historic park overlooking the southern end of Babi Yar. The school accepts students from 5th grade through to and including 12th grade.

== History ==
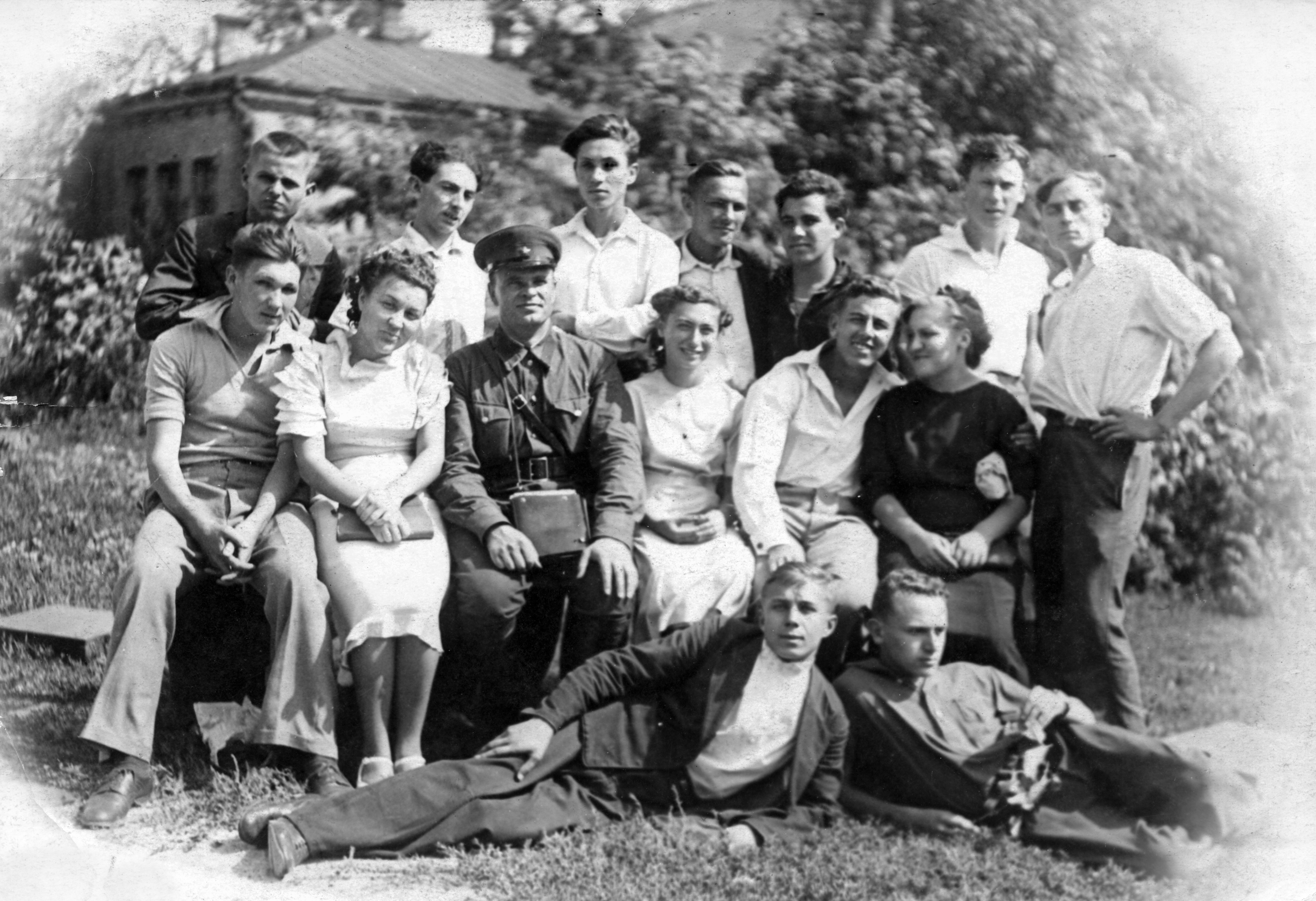
The first graduation class from the Shevchenko State Art School, 1940.

The school was established on August 12, 1937, and was originally located at 2 Volodymyrska Street, Kyiv. The designer and builder of the new school building was the architect Joseph Karakis. At the time, this was the only art school building and institute of its type in the Soviet Union.

The first pupils graduated on 29 June 1940. Due to the threat of war with Germany, all graduates from this class as well as directors of the school were conscripted into the Soviet Army and sent to the Eastern Front.

The school was vacant until 1944 when the building was taken over by the National Museum of the History of Ukraine, and the school moved to new premises. Today, the school is located in 4 Zhambyl Zhabayuly Street, Kyiv.

== Notable alumni ==
There are many notable artists among its graduates, including:

- Andriy Chebykin
- Christina Katrakis
- Peter Kravchenko
- Oleg Kulik
- Kost Lavro
- Yuri Makoveychuk
- Alina Panova
- Les Podervyansky
- Vlada Ralko
- Arsen Savadov
- Mikhail Turovsky
- Roman Turovsky
- Glib Vysheslavsky
- Nicholas Zalevsky
- Galyna Zubchenko
