= She Paid the Ultimate Price =

2011 documentary

She Paid The Ultimate Price (Ukrainian: «Вона заплатила життям», romanized: Vona zaplatyla zhyttiam) is a 2011 documentary produced, directed and co-written by Iryna Korpan, a Ukrainian-Canadian television personality. The film is based on the life of her own grandmother, Kateryna Sikorska, who was executed by hanging by the Nazis in 1943 for hiding a Jewish family in her cellar.

Kateryna Sikorska was eventually awarded the title of "Righteous among the Nations".

The film's soundtrack incorporates music by Maksym Berezovsky, Levko Revutsky, Myroslav Skoryk, Victor Mishalow, Roman Turovsky and Michael Alpert.
