= Shevchenko Monument (Ottawa) =

Taras Shevchenko Monument in Ottawa
- Canada
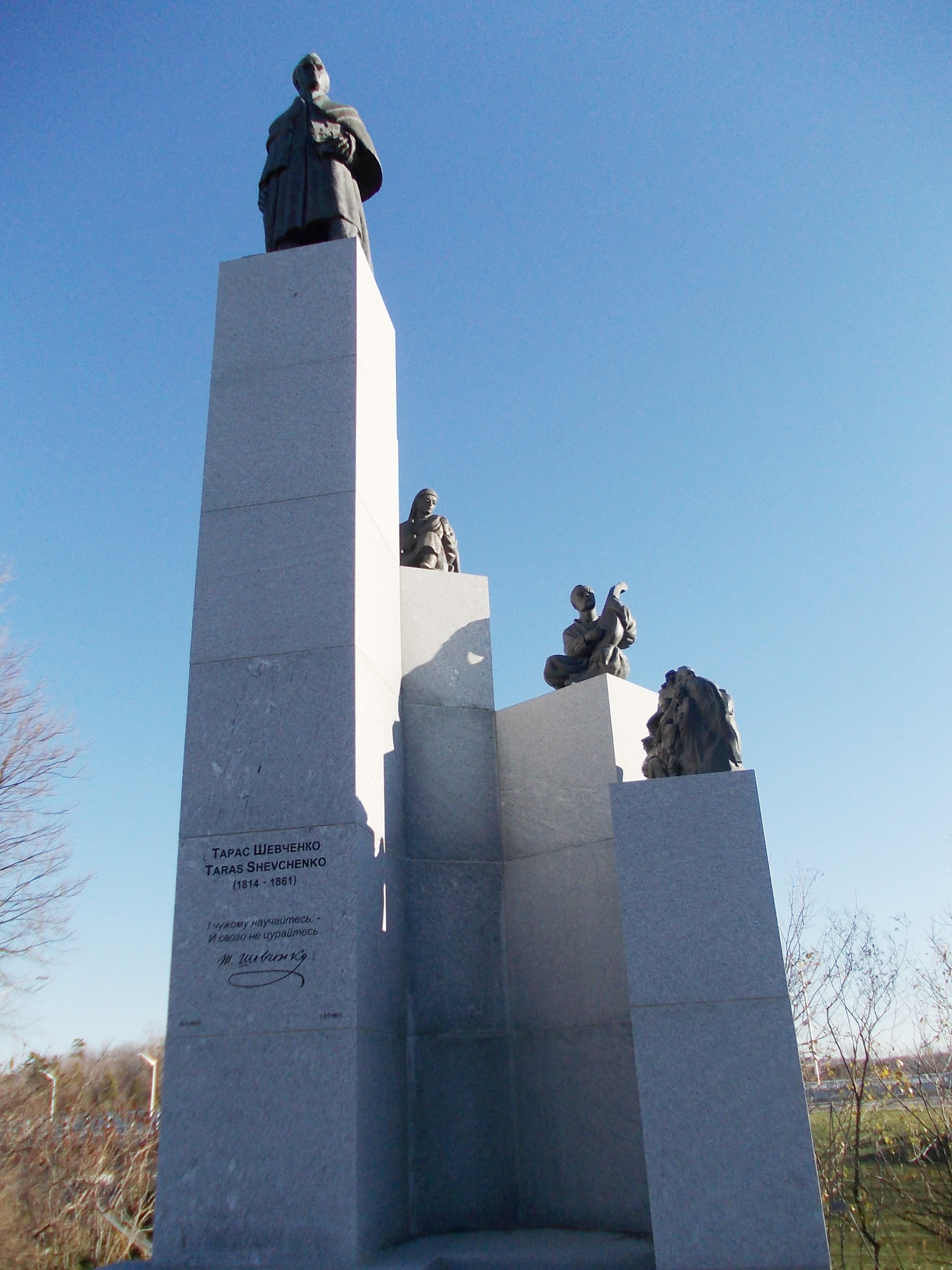
- Taras Shevchenko Monument in Ottawa
- For Taras Shevchenko
- Unveiled: 26 June 2011
- Location: 45°22′35″N 075°42′12″W; Saint John the Baptist Ukrainian Catholic Shrine, 952 Green Valley Crescent near Ottawa
- Designed by: Leo Mol,

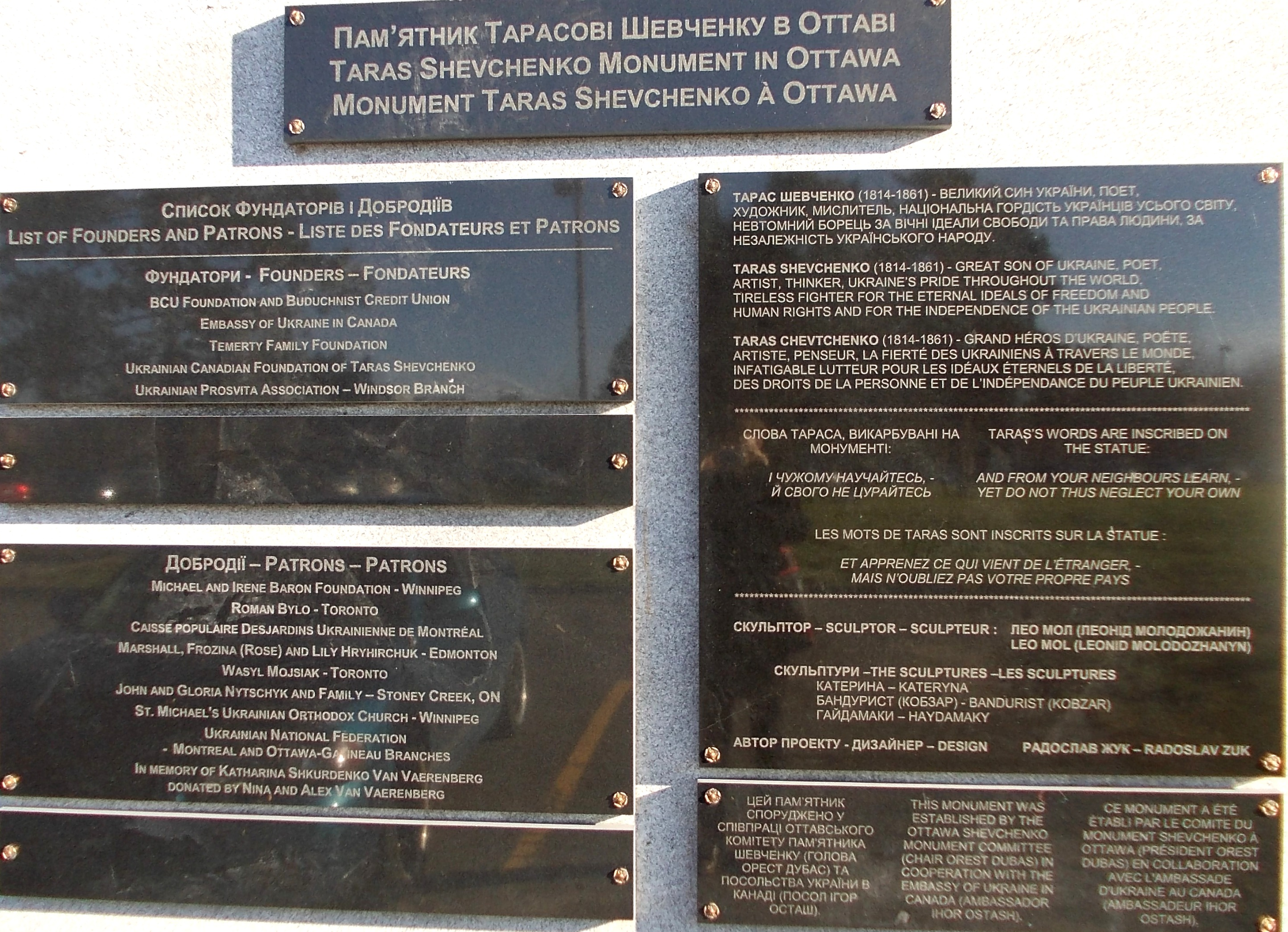
Memorial plaque

On The Shevchenko Monument is a bronze and granite monument of Taras Shevchenko, created by Leo Mol, that was unveiled on 26 June 2011 in Ottawa, Ontario, Canada.

The composition of the monument includes four items: Taras Shevchenko, and three bas-relief figures complementing the composition. The central monument, sitting on a granite base approximately 8.5 m (28 ft) high, holds a young version of a standing Taras Shevchenko. Dressed in a long coat, the fashion at that time, he holds a palette and three paintbrushes and looks out into the distance. The figure is 3 m (9.8 ft) high and weighs 630 kg (1,390 lb).

Three shorter bases hold artistic creations from his poetry. One of the bas-relief figures, standing 1.2 m (3 ft 11 in) and weighing 156 kg (344 lb), represents Haydamaky (referring to Haidamakas) an epic poem of Shevchenko's about the Cossack paramilitary bands that rose up against the szlachta (Polish nobility) in right-bank Ukraine in the 18th-century.

The next, Kateryna with child (1.2 m (3 ft 11 in), 163 kg (359 lb)), recalls his early ballad about a Ukrainian girl seduced then abandoned by a Russian - symbolic of the tsarist imposition of serfdom in Ukraine and refers to Shevchenko's painting Kateryna.

The last, Banduryst (1.2 m (3 ft 11 in), 156 kg (344 lb)), referring to the Kobzar and Bandura, a traditional Ukrainian stringed musical instrument shaped like a lute.

Nearly 90,000 kg (200,000 lb) of Stanstead grey granite from Quebec, was used to create the bases for the monument.

The monument is located the grounds of the Saint John the Baptist Ukrainian Catholic Shrine, 952 Green Valley Crescent, Ottawa, Ontario.
