= Peter Kravchenko =

Ukrainian-Australian artist (1921–2009)

Peter Mytrofanovych Kravchenko
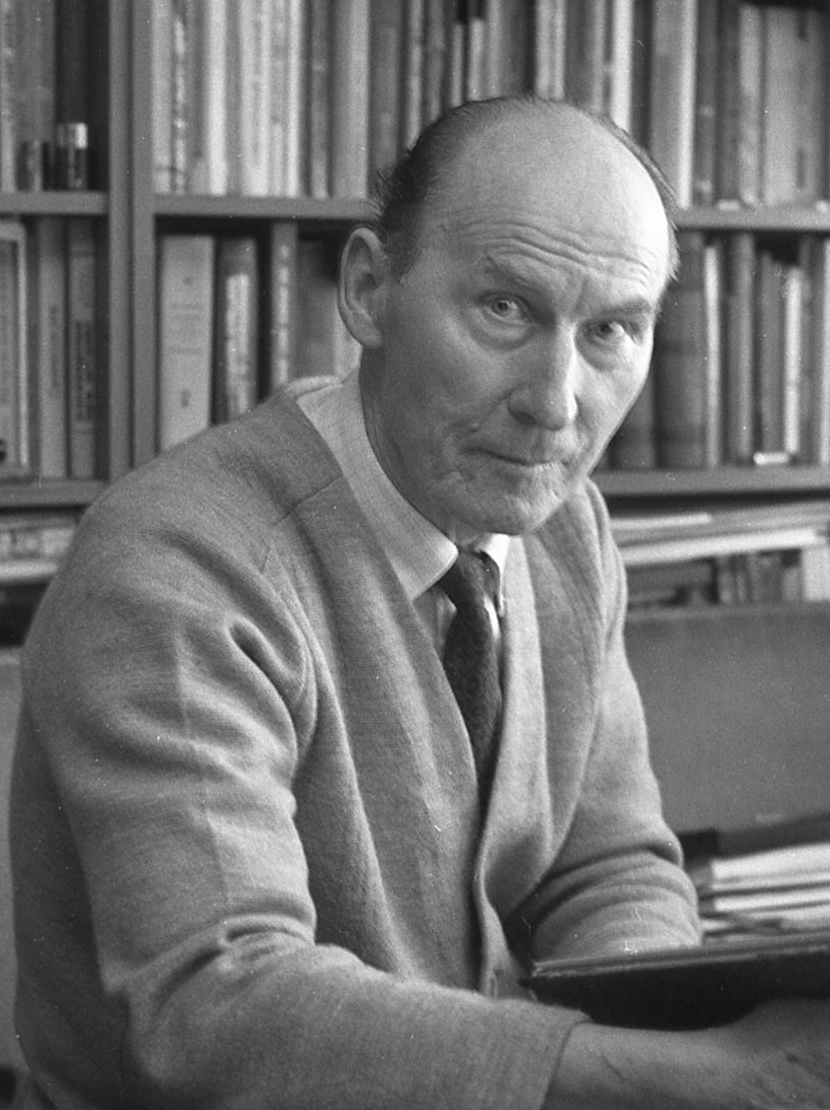
- Born: 21 June 1921; Kyiv, Ukraine
- Died: 27 November 2009 (aged 88); Sydney, Australia
- Education: Shevchenko State Art School
- Notable work: "My Thoughts," "On Ivan Kupala" "Pereyaslivsʹka Rada"

Peter Mytrofanovych Kravchenko (21 June 1921 - 27 November 2009) was a Ukrainian artist and public figure.

== Biography ==
Peter Kravchenko was born on 21 June 1921, in Podil, Kyiv, to a hard-working family. His father, Mitrofan Hryhorovych, had a small ice cream operation in the summer season, and in the fall he engaged in glass production. In 1940 Kravchenko graduated from Taras Shevchenko State Art School in Kyiv. During the war he was a German prisoner. After the Second World War he remained in Germany, where he worked as a set designer. In 1949 he went to Australia and settled in Sydney. After the end of the state employment contract at the brick factory, he worked on the railway. During this work he continued his professional education, graduated from the Institute of Commercial Arts and the School of Television Training.

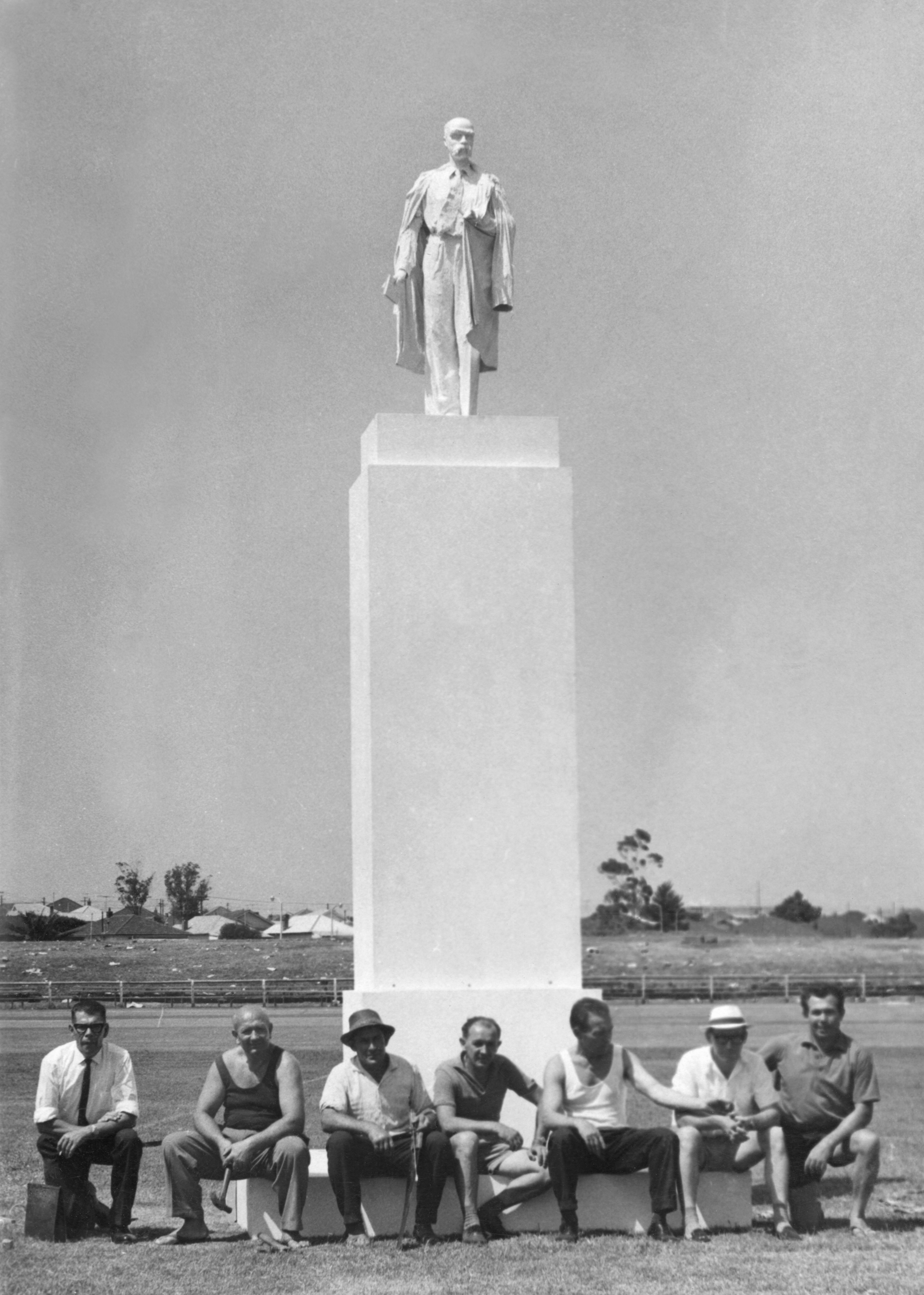
Monument to Taras Shevchenko in Lidcombe designed by Peter Kravchenko 1964.

He became involved in Ukrainian social and cultural life, designed scenes for performances and concerts. He designed a large number of artistic programs for various national awards and concerts, as well as a diploma of the Australian Federation of Ukrainian Organisations and the award of the Foundation for Ukrainian Studies in Australia (FUSA). He also illustrated books.

He worked at the ABC Television studio in Sydney as an "accessory designer" at the Wardrobe department for 20 years, making items for various shows and television series. He was credited with making the bandolier, belts and badges for the period police uniforms in the ABC-TV series production Ben Hall.

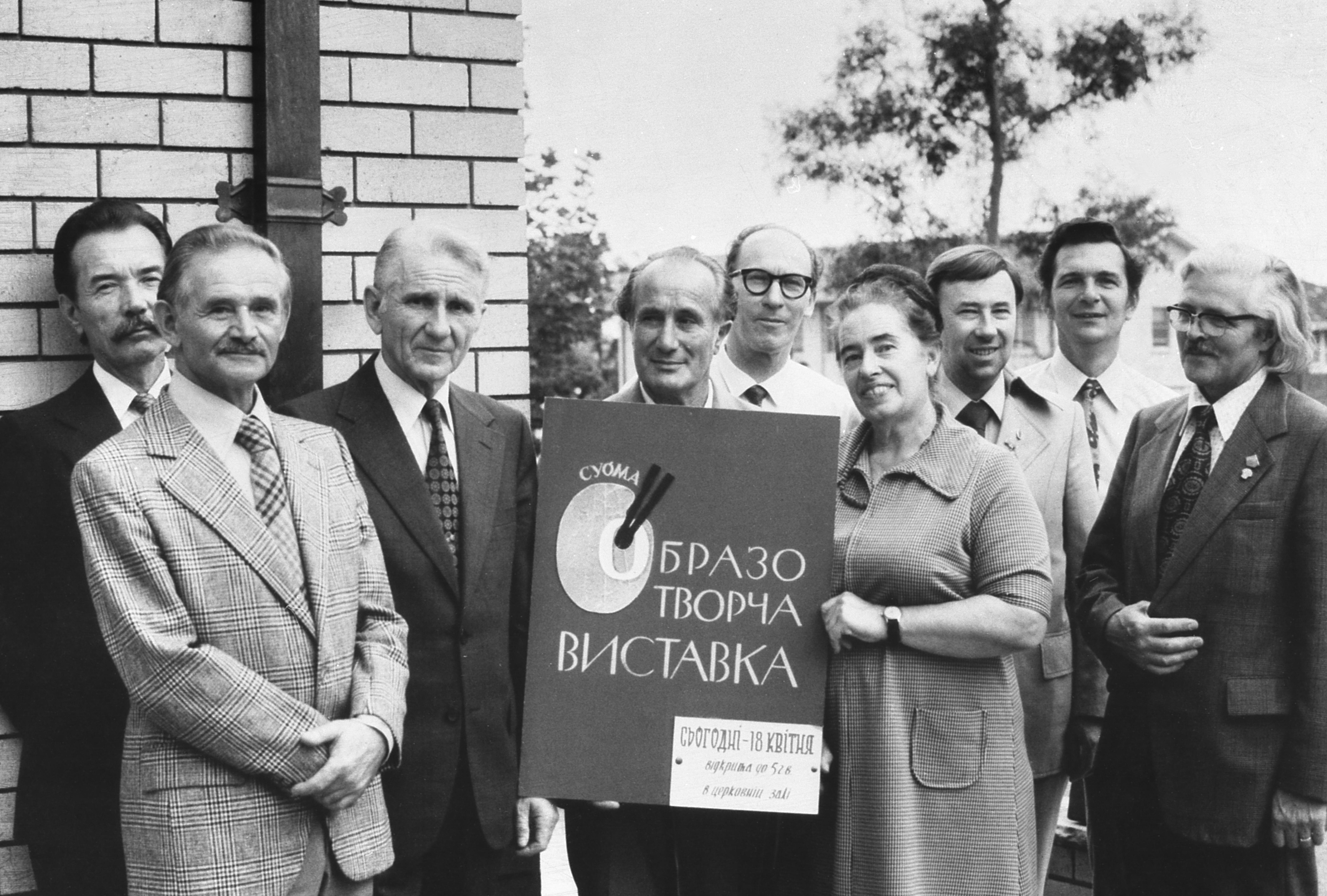
Peter Kravchenko together with artists Union of Ukrainian Fine Artists of Australia during an exhibition in 1976 .

In 1967 he was one of the founders of the Ukrainian Artists Society of Australia, and he was the acting secretary from 1967 to 2007. In 1975 he was one of the founders of FUSA in Australia and a permanent member. In 1991-1998 he belonged to the Directorate of this institution.

== Art ==
Kravchenko exhibited his paintings at Ukrainian Artists Society of Australia exhibitions in Lidcombe, Wollongong, Sydney, Adelaide, and Melbourne. In 1992, a solo exhibition was held in Sydney, showing 65 of his works. In the same year he was an exhibitor with his three works: "On Ivan Kupala", "Pereyaslivska Rada", and "Princess Olga" at the exhibition "Unity" in Kyiv. One work - "My Thoughts" (portrait of Taras Shevchenko) was donated and exhibited at the Taras Shevchenko National Museum. In 1994 he was accepted as an honorary member of the National Union of Artists of Ukraine, and in 1997 a personal exhibition "Burden of Ukraine through the Ages" was organized at the Museum of History of Kyiv, dedicated to the 2nd World Forum of Ukrainians. In 1999, the first album of the artist "The burden of Ukraine through the ages" was released, which presents 65 samples of Ukrainian costumes (clothes) worn by Ukrainian people.

== Social activities ==
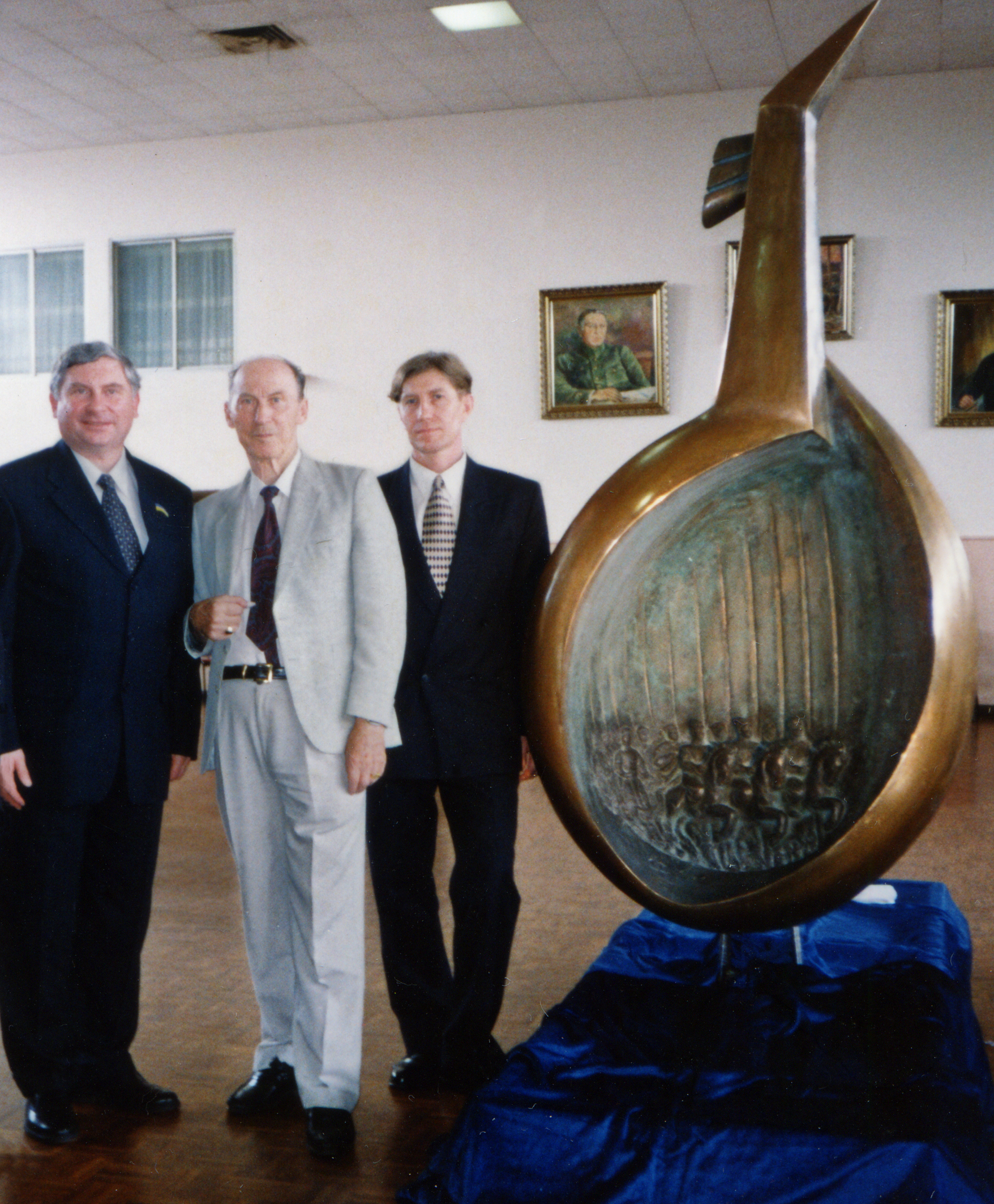
Petro Kravchenko (center) with sculptor Anatoliy Valiev (right) during the presentation «Monument to Shevchenko's Thoughts» 2000.

Kravchenko was an honorary member of the International Charitable Foundation "Spiritual Heritage" (Kyiv) and an accredited correspondent of the newspaper "The Free Thought." He was awarded diplomas and medals from the Australian Federation of Ukrainian Organisations, from the Union for the Liberation of Ukraine, the Gold Medal "For Patronage" of the International Charitable Foundation "Ukrainian House" (Kyiv), others from the International Charitable Foundation "Spiritual Heritage" and the Ukrainian Orthodox Church Certificate of Merit in Australia, Ukrainian Community Sydney.

In 1996 he organized an exhibition in Kyiv dedicated to the 150th anniversary of Nicholas Miklouho-Maclay and initiated the issuance of a postage stamp by Ukrposhta dedicated to the 150th anniversary of Nicholas Miklouho-Maclay. In 1998, thanks to his efforts, Ukrposhta issued a postage stamp dedicated to the 50th anniversary of the Ukrainian settlement in Australia. In 2000, he organized the arrival of a delegation of the Kyiv City Council to establish cultural relations between the cities of Kyiv and Sydney and to bring a sculpture-monument "Shevchenko's Dumas" as a gift to Ukrainians in Sydney from Ukraine.

He was awarded the Diploma of the Ministry of Culture and Arts of Ukraine (2003).

== Sources and further reading ==
- Винниченко Ігор. Кравченко Петро Митрофанович // Енциклопедія історії України : у 10 т. / редкол.: В. А. Смолій (голова) та ін.; Інститут історії України НАН України. — К. : Наукова думка, 2009. — Т. 5 : Кон — Кю. — С. 274. — 560 с. : іл. — ISBN 966-00-0632-2, 978-966-00-0855-4.
- Рудаков Микола. Щоб не порвалась історії нитка... // Урядовий кур'єр: газета.1999,15 липня. С.16
- Рудаков Микола. Українці діаспори дарують. // Урядовий кур'єр: газета.2001,13 квітня. С.16
- Наказ Міністерства культури і мистецтв України No. 485-к від 17.07.2003 р.
