= Yuri Makoveychuk =

American painter

- Юрій Маковейчук
- Born: 1961 (age 64–65); Kiev, Ukrainian SSR, Soviet Union (now Kyiv, Ukraine)
- Occupations: Artist, painter, filmmaker

Yuri Makoveychuk (Note: Ukrainian: Юрій Маковейчук, romanized: Yurii Makoveichuk) (born 1961) is an artist-painter, filmmaker and scenic designer working in the rare field of mannequin animation.

== Biography ==
Makoveychuk was born in Kiev, Ukrainian SSR, Soviet Union (now Kyiv, Ukraine) in 1961. He moved to Philadelphia in 1990, and later to New York City. He studied art at the Shevchenko State Art School in Kyiv (his classmates there also included Roman Turovsky and Alina Panova). He continued his art studies at the Kyiv State Art Academy (BFA), and the Art Institute of Philadelphia (MFA).

== Career ==
=== Painter ===
- "Designing Intelligence" Exhibition (Florida Atlantic University ).

=== Film-maker ===
Makoveychuk produced two animated feature films, "Radioman" (1999) and "The Institute" (2003). Eventually "Radioman" won the Parma festival of animation prize.

=== Scenographer ===
Makoveychuk participated (in the capacity of a production designer) in many independent film and television productions in Europe, notably in 2008 Norwegian film "Iskyss" ("Icekiss"), as well as the "Three Musqueteers" (2004 TV musical) and "Twelve Chairs" (2005 TV musical), as well as the sets for the Maria Burmaka and Verka Serdyuchka performances. He also has been active as a scenic artist ("Great Expectations", "Godzilla", "As Good As It Gets", "DeviI's Advocate" et al.

== Filmography ==
- Radioman (1999)
- The Institute (2003)
