= Terrell Stone =

Terrell Stone is an American lutenist and recording artist. He is a longtime resident of Italy, where he holds the position of a Professor of lute.

He began his musical studies in the United States, dedicating himself to the study of the lute since 1974. Beginning in 1978 he studied at the "Schola Cantorum Basiliensis" in Basel, Switzerland under Eugene Dombois and Hopkinson Smith and in Paris, France under Frank Eyler.

He completed his lute studies at the Italian State Conservatory "F. E. Dall'Abaco" in Verona under the guidance of Orlando Cristoforetti.

For many years he has performed as a soloist and has participated in important music festivals in North and South America, Europe and the Middle East. He is also very active as a chamber musician, performing basso continuo on the archlute and theorbo.

Stone has recorded for television, radio and recording companies and has over thirty recordings to his credit. His solo recordings include a compact disc of the solo music of Johann Paul Schiffelholz (misattributed to Giuseppe Antonio Brescianello) for gallichon, a three-CD box set containing partitas composed by Silvius Leopold Weiss for baroque lute from the Warsaw manuscript, and a CD containing music of 16th century Paduan lute composers recorded in the famous anatomical theater of the "Università degli Studi di Padova" (University of Padua).

During his over 25 years of residency in Italy, Stone has taught lute at the Conservatory "Santa Cecilia" in Rome, at the Conservatory "N. Piccini" in Bari and is Professor of lute and President of the Early Music Department at the Conservatory "A. Pedrollo" in Vicenza.

In addition to his performing, recording, and teaching activities, Stone has edited several modern editions of music for lute and has conducted research and has written scholarly articles concerning Silvius Leopold Weiss. He has given seminars and master classes in the United States, Germany, Italy, Denmark and Mexico, and participated in the development of the MacOS9 computer program 'Tastar de Corde', used for writing lute tablature and transcribing it to modern notation.
