= Francesco Spinacino =

Italian lutenist and composer

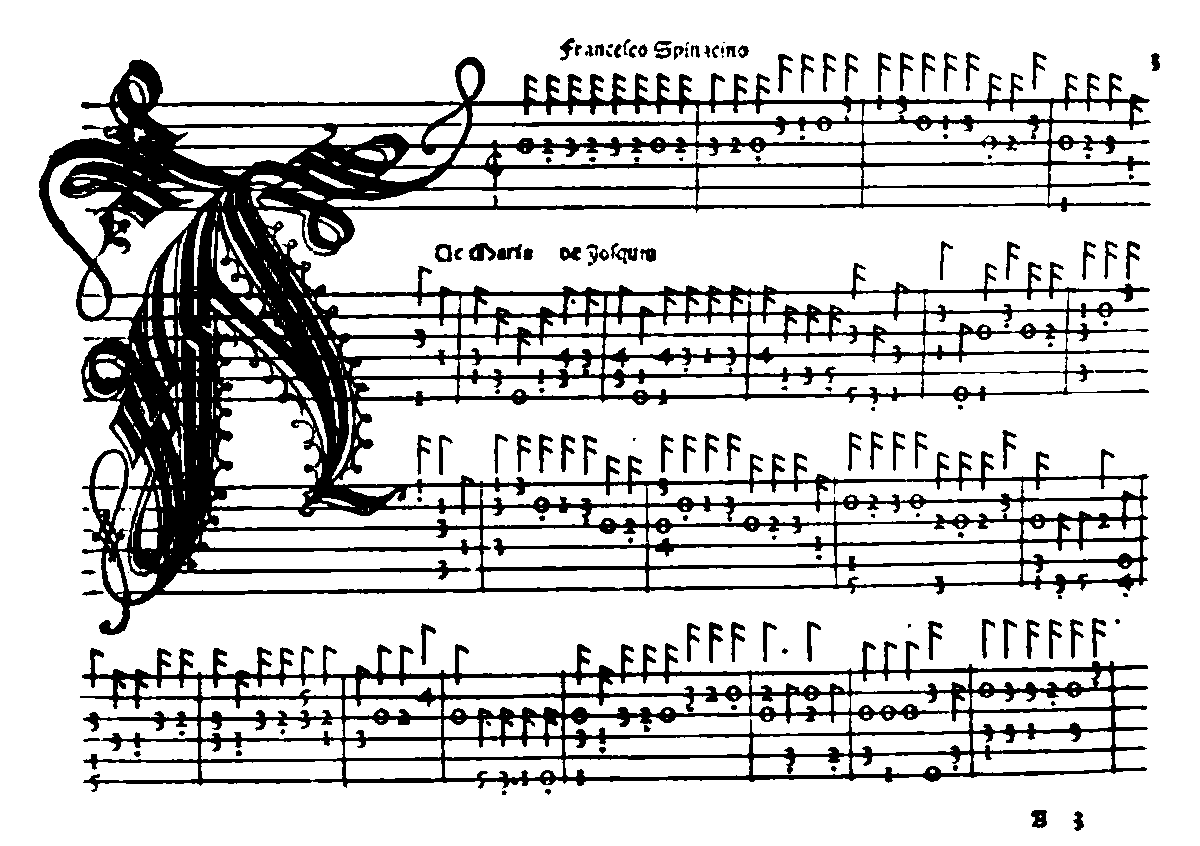
First page of Spinacino's Intabolatura de lauto libro primo (1507)

Francesco Spinacino (fl. 1507) was an Italian lutenist and composer. His surviving output comprises the first two volumes of Ottaviano Petrucci's influential series of lute music publications: Intabolatura de lauto libro primo and Intabolatura de lauto libro secondo (both 1507). These two collections comprise the first known printed lute music, and his first book was the first ever instrumental music book printed with the movable type system.

Spinacino was apparently highly regarded by his contemporaries, as his music was widely copied: some of the pieces are found in manuscripts that originated in the British Isles. There are 81 pieces overall: 46 intabulations, 27 ricercares, two bassadans and six pieces for lute duet. The ricercares are among the most complex of the period; they have no clearly defined form and include several contrasting sections. Particularly notable is Recercare de tutti li toni, which moves through all modes. The duets are also historically important, for they present a sample of early 16th century performance practice: one of the lutes is given an intabulation of a chanson's original tenor and bass, whereas the other plays in free counterpoint to the titular chanson.
