= Roman Turovsky-Savchuk =

American painter and composer

- Роман Туровський-Савчук
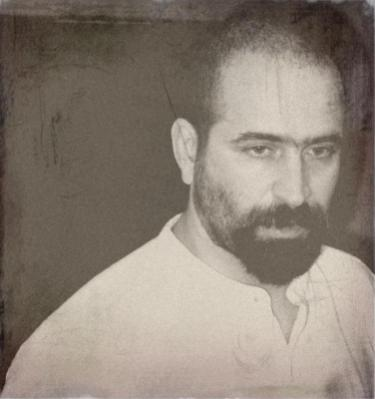
- Born: May 16, 1961 (age 65); Kiev, Ukrainian SSR, Soviet Union (now Kyiv, Ukraine)
- Education: Taras Shevchenko State Art School, Parsons School of Design
- Known for: artist, composer, lutenist, scenographer
- Website: Roman Turovsky

Roman Mykhailovych Turovsky-Savchuk (Note: Ukrainian: Роман Михайлович Туровський-Савчук, romanized: Roman Mykhailovych Turovskyi-Savchuk) (born May 16, 1961) is an American artist-painter, photographer and videoinstallation artist, as well as a lutenist-composer, born in Ukraine. His musical works were published under various pseudonyms, including Johann Joachim Sautscheck.

== Biography ==
Turovsky was born in Kyiv, Ukraine in 1961, when it was part of the Soviet Union. He studied art from an early age under his father, the painter Mikhail Turovsky and at the Shevchenko State Art School in Kyiv. He also began to be interested in music in his teens. The family emigrated to New York City in 1979. They first lived in the Bronx. Turovsky continued his art studies in New York at the Parsons School of Design, studying concurrently Historical Performance (Baroque Lute) and Composition, under Patrick O'Brien, Pier Luigi Cimma, Leonid Hrabovsky and Davide Zannoni.

=== Art ===
Turovsky began composing in the early 1990s, simultaneously embarking on a career as a prolific artist-painter. He participated in many exhibitions. His first one-man show was held in June 2006 in New York, and the second in February 2013. Eight of his paintings are in the permanent collection of the International Marian Institute at the University of Dayton.

=== Cinema and television ===
Turovsky worked as a scenic artist in the production of Jim Jarmusch's film "Ghost Dog", Paul Schrader's "First Reformed", David Bowie's Blackstar as well as in Tom DiCillo's "Double Whammy", Law & Order: Organized Crime and other films. He is a member of United Scenic Artists.

== Music ==
As a composer, Turovsky concentrated on the instrumental idiom of the Baroque lute and the torban, as well as viola da gamba and carillon. He composed over 1100 instrumental and vocal works influenced by his Ukrainian heritage and the baroque. Many of these were premiered by Luca Pianca at several international festivals (Salamanca, Lisbon, Schwetzingen, Vilnius, Vicenza, Urbino, Metz and Paris), Roland Ferrandi in Corte, Simon Paulus at Wolfenbüttel and Jindřich Macek in Přibyslav, Kraty, Prague and Hvar. He also collaborated with Paulo Galvão and Hans Kockelmans in a series of experimental works which they jointly composed. His works have been performed/recorded by Robert Barto, Robert MacKillop, Oleg Timofeyev, Massimo Marchese, John Schneiderman, Thomas Schall, Trond Bengtson, Terrell Stone, Christopher Wilke and Bernhard Hofstötter on lute, Angelo Barricelli and Fernando Lewis de Mattos on guitar, Ernst Stolz on viola da gamba, as well as Hans Kockelmans and Olesya Rostovskaya on carillon. In 2011 and 2013 Turovsky was profiled in two 1 hour-long programs on the Dutch Classical radio-station Concertzender. He also composed over 40 tombeaux dedicated to various cultural figures. These were described by Pablo del Pozo as being of "unquestionable musical quality".

As a performer, Turovsky-Savchuk appeared as a lute soloist and continuo player in the Early Music line-up of Julian Kytasty's "New York Bandura Ensemble" and "Radio Banduristan". Roman Turovsky was a recipient of the 2008 NYSCA grant for the purpose of study of kobzar art with Julian Kytasty.

Roman Turovsky-Savchuk is a founding member of Vox Saeculorum and The Delian Society, two international groups devoted to the preservation and perpetuation of tonal music. He was described as composer-extraordinaire by the British author Suhayl Saadi.

Turovsky-Savchuk contributed to the soundtracks of the documentaries "A Rising Fury" (2022) and "She Paid The Ultimate Price" (2011), and in 2013 to the Marko Robert Stech's Georgy Narbut episode in the KontaktTV Toronto (OMNI TV (Canada)) series "Eyes on Culture" No.55.

=== Discography ===
- Stuart Walsh - "Impiae Stellae" (Polyhymnion CD005, USA 2025)
- Alberto Crugnola - "Am I Dreaming" - (Novantica Records, Italy 2024)
- Scott Saari - "Fantasma Pacis" (Polyhymnion CD004, USA 2023)
- Volodymyr Voyt - "Pulchritudo In Tempore Belli" (Polyhymnion CD003, USA 2023)
- Massimo Marchese - "Dialogues with Time" (daVinci Edition C00028, Japan 2017)
- Christopher Wilke - "De Temporum Fine Postludia II" (Polyhymnion CD002, USA 2019)
- Christopher Wilke - "De Temporum Fine Postludia" (Polyhymnion CD001, USA 2016)
- Daniel Shoskes - "Weiss Undercover" (USA, 2016)
- Daniel Shoskes - "Lautenschmaus" CD (USA, 2011)
- Angelo Barricelli - "From Borderlands" (Lira Classica, Italy, 2008)
- Thomas Schall - "Die Laute im Barock" LCCD 0202 (The Lute Corner, Switzerland, 2002)

=== Allonyms and pseudonyms ===
Since 1996 Turovsky has signed his musical works for baroque lute as Sautscheck, a German transliteration of the second part of his surname as an allonym. Turovsky used a variety of constructions, such as Johann Joachim and Konradin Aemilius, for first names attached to Sautscheck. He represented the works as newly discovered manuscripts by supposed 17th-, 18th- and 19th-century composers from several generations of the same family. Turovsky published Mikrokosmos, a collection of nearly 800 Renaissance-style pieces based on Ukrainian folk melodies under the pseudonyms "Ioannes Leopolita" and "Jacobus Olevsiensis".

His works for lute achieved wide circulation under the allonym of Sautscheck and the pseudonyms "Ioannes Leopolita" and "Jacobus Olevsiensis". Musicologist Douglas Alton Smith perceived these works as malicious hoaxes and forgeries because of their ostensibly baroque or earlier styles. The controversy in 2000 over what some considered an outright hoax led to coinage of a new German word, Sautscheckerei, which denoted a musical or literary hoax.

He is currently (as of 2023) published by the Lundgren Edition in Sweden under his real name.

== Literary activities ==
Turovsky's poetry translations (from Russian, Ukrainian, Polish and other languages) have appeared in the literary almanacs Asymptote Journal, Cardinal Points, Circumference,The Germ,, Odessa Review and various web publications. His translations of the early futurist works of Mykola Bazhan are included in the 2020 edition of Bazhan's "Quiet Spiders Of The Hidden Soul".

He also undertook research into the history of the torban, a Ukrainian musical instrument of the lute family, and wrote the chapter on it for the 2011 edition of "Die Laute in Europa".
