= Christopher Wilke =

American composer

Christopher Wilke (born 1973) is an American composer, lutenist, guitarist, recording artist, and teacher.

== Biography ==
Born in Cincinnati, Wilke studied guitar and composition at the College of Mount St. Joseph, and took his master's degree in guitar from the University of Cincinnati's College Conservatory. He completed his doctorate in Early Music Performance with an Emphasis on Historical Plucked Strings (lute, theorbo and guitar) at the Eastman School of Music, under the tutelage of Paul O'Dette.

=== Composer ===
Several of his compositions, including "Emperor Romulus Augustus, His Serious Funk" and "Diatribe," have been published by Les Productions d'Oz in Montreal, Canada.

=== Performer ===
Wilke has given solo recitals in Italy and Germany as well as the United States. He has taught at the Guitar Foundation of America's Convention and the American Musicological Society's Annual Meeting. His recordings have been featured on Concertzender radio in the Netherlands, on Canadian Television, and such NPR programs as Classical Guitar Alive! and Sunday Morning Baroque.

== Discography ==
- "De Temporum Fine Postludia II" (Roman Turovsky: Works for Baroque lute) Polyhymnion 002, 2019
- "De Temporum Fine Postludia" (Roman Turovsky: Works for Baroque lute) Polyhymnion 001, 2016
- "Desperate Doors" (Works for lute by J.S.Bach, Adam Falckenhagen, Sylvius Leopold Weiss 2015)
- "Graceful Degradation" (works by Johann Adolph Hasse, Paul Charles Durant, Franz Joseph Haydn and Jakob Friedrich Kleinknecht 2013)
- "Charles Hurel: Theorbo Works", Centaur Records CRC 2875
