= Joachim van den Hove =

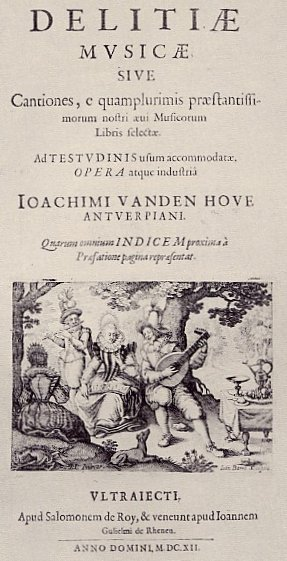
Title page of Delitiae Musicae

Joachim van den Hove (1567? – 1620) was a Flemish/Dutch composer and a lutenist. He composed works for lute solo and for lute and voice. Moreover, he wrote many arrangements for lute of Italian, French, and English vocal and instrumental music, and of Flemish/Dutch folk music. Van den Hove disputes with Adriaensen and Vallet the distinction of being the most important representative of 17th century Dutch lute music.

Van den Hove was born in Antwerp, where his father, Peeter van den Hove, was a respected musician. After the Fall of Antwerp in 1584–5 the family fled north. From at least 1593 to 1616 Joachim lived in Leiden, where in 1594 he married Anna Rodius (originally "de Roy") from Utrecht. There he was a lutenist and also lute teacher. His most famous pupils were the young Frederick Henry, Prince of Orange and Maurice of Nassau, Prince of Orange.

Van den Hove's financial fortunes declined and in 1616 his properties were confiscated. Before his Leiden home was sold by public auction in 1618, he had fled to The Hague, where he died in poverty in 1620.

Published collections of his works are:

- Florida, sive cantiones (Utrecht, 1601)
- Delitiae Musicae (Utrecht, 1612)
- Praeludia testudinis (Leiden, 1616)

Works in manuscripts:

- Christoph Herold - Lautenbuch, 1602
- Joachim van den Hove - Lautenbuch, 1615 (Autograph)
- Ernst Schele - Tabulaturbuch, 1619
