= D. Dominick Lombardi =

American artist (born 1954)

- Born: June 29, 1954 (age 72); Bronx, New York, U.S.
- Education: Westchester Community College (faculty), Castle Gallery (curator), George Mason University (lecturer)
- Occupations: Visual artist, writer, art critic, curator
- Years active: 1977–present
- Employer: dArt international magazine (U.S. editor)
- Known for: Post Apocalyptic Tattoo series, dArt international magazine, New York Times art criticism
- Notable work: The Post Apocalyptic Tattoo series; High+Low retrospective; Curatorial work at Lab Gallery, Hampden Gallery, Morean Arts Center

D. Dominick Lombardi (born June 29, 1954) is a visual artist, writer and art critic; the U.S. editor of dArt international magazine; as well as a curator. He was an art critic for The New York Times from 1998 to 2005.

== Biography ==
D. Dominick Lombardi was born into the family of an Italian-American carpenter in the Bronx, New York, in 1954. He worked in the family carpentry shop as a teenager.

He was a regular contributor for the Huffington Post from 2012 to 2018, and a curator for the Hampden Gallery at UMASS Amherst, with his most recent effort titled "A Horse Walks Into a Bar" and the Morean Arts Center in St. Petersburg, Florida, titled "I Am...".

He was a curator and a curatorial advisor for the Lab Gallery (2004–2006), producing over 60 exhibitions in three years with a cycle of 10-day exhibitions.

Lombardi taught life drawing, painting, and beginning drawing as an adjunct art professor at Westchester Community College from 1988–2015. His additional affiliations in the field included: board chair, Castle Gallery, College of New Rochelle, NY, 1996–98, where he initiated the first Westchester Biennial in 1998, a position he left later that year when he began writing for The New York Times; member of the International Association of Art Critics, 2001–2007; and art advisor for Pfizer at Doral Arrowwood Educational Center, Purchase, NY, 1997–1998.

High+Low, A Forty-Five Year Retrospective of the art of D. Dominick Lombardi, curated by T. Michael Martin, opened at the Clara M. Eagle Gallery in western Kentucky's Murray State University on August 15, 2019. It was slated to travel, but due to the restrictions of COVID-19, the ensuing exhibitions have been postponed. In his catalogue essay, curator Martin writes:

Lombardi's masterful mix of high and low culture is as current as the day it was created, showing how little the aesthetics of human behavior have changed. In some ways, Lombardi's distortions are a more truthful look at society than our daily facade of polite policy and political correctness, especially in the way we prompt contention, as Lombardi offers a much-needed change and disruption through his unique sense of humor.

Common throughout the works, Lombardi reveals source, influence, and process that allow the viewer a glimpse into the stages of his creations. They are, in essence, an open interpretation, veiled in playfulness, to put forth a more in-depth investigation of some very real concerns. His narrative is staged, directed, and then morphed through mostly unconventional combinations, as the resulting compositions encourage us to investigate beyond the surface of each work. A suggested glimpse into an apocalyptic breakdown of society, where we are allowed to emerge charged, reconfigured, and prepared to push forward, is a cunning execution where questions flow and commentary is made as the viewer reexamines the world revealed around them.

In relationship to his long career in the arts as a visual artist, art writer and curator, George Mason University in Fairfax, VA, invited Lombardi to participate in their series of professional lectures collectively titled Visual Voices. Lombardi's talk, Resilience and Focus, was presented virtually as a video on September 10, 2020 due to the restrictions of COVID-19.

== Works ==
Lombardi has been exhibiting since 1977 in various venues, for example the Stamford Museum in 1997, the Stamford Branch Gallery in 2000, the Blue Star Contemporary Art Center in 2008, at Florida Atlantic University in 2009, and at Artlexis in Brooklyn in 2009. Lombardi's art has been reviewed in various publications.

Lombardi is known for the Post Apocalyptic Tattoo series which spanned the decade between 1998 and 2008 which culminated in two one-man shows. The first exhibition in 2008, was held at Blue Star Contemporary Art Center in San Antonio, TX, titled The Post Apocalyptic Tattoo: A Ten Year Survey. The second exhibition was held at the Housatonic Museum of Art in Bridgeport, CT, opened in September 2009.

In addition to his art, Lombardi has had articles been published in The New York Times, ARTslant, Art in Asia (S. Korea), Public Art and Ecology (China), Art Experience NYC, Sculpture, Sculpture Review, d'ART (U.S. Editor), Art Papers, Art Lies, ARTnews, & magazine, Art New England and culturecatch.com among others. His reviews and feature articles for The New York Times appeared between 1998 and 2005. Also, Lombardi has curated a variety of exhibitions in museums and galleries across the U. S. including Monkey Spoon and Anonymous among others.
