= Alina Panova =

Ukrainian artist (born 1961)

Alina Panova (full name Alina Panova-Marasovich, born Alina Vaksman in Kiev, Ukraine) is a Ukrainian-American film and stage costume designer and producer.

== Biography ==
Panova was born in Kiev, Ukraine, in 1961. She studied art at the Shevchenko State Art School in Kiev, and Cooper Union in New York City, after her family emigrated to the US in 1979.

== Career ==
In 2006 Panova produced her first feature film, ORANGELOVE (directed by Alan Badoyev and starring Aleksei Chadov and Olga Makeyeva). The film premiered at the Cannes Film Festival.

== Family ==
Panova is married to Croatian composer Zeljko Marasovich. She lives in Los Angeles, California.

== Filmography ==
- The Age of Innocence (1993)
- Addams Family Values (1993)
- Notes From Underground (1995)
- Dunston Checks In (1996)
- The Naked Man (1998)
- Bruiser (2000)
- Sexual Life (2005)
- Standing Still (2005)
- Orangelove (2007)
