= Mandore (instrument) =

Musical instrument

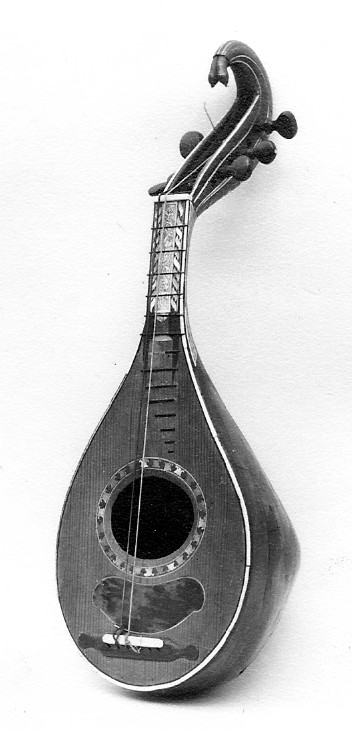
- Mandora c. 1700–1799 exhibited at the Metropolitan Museum of Art, NY

String instrument
- Classification: String instrument; Plucked string instrument

Related instruments
- List: Bandola; Bandurria; bouzouki; Gittern; Lute; Mandolin; Mandola; Octave mandola; Oud

Lombardy mandolin

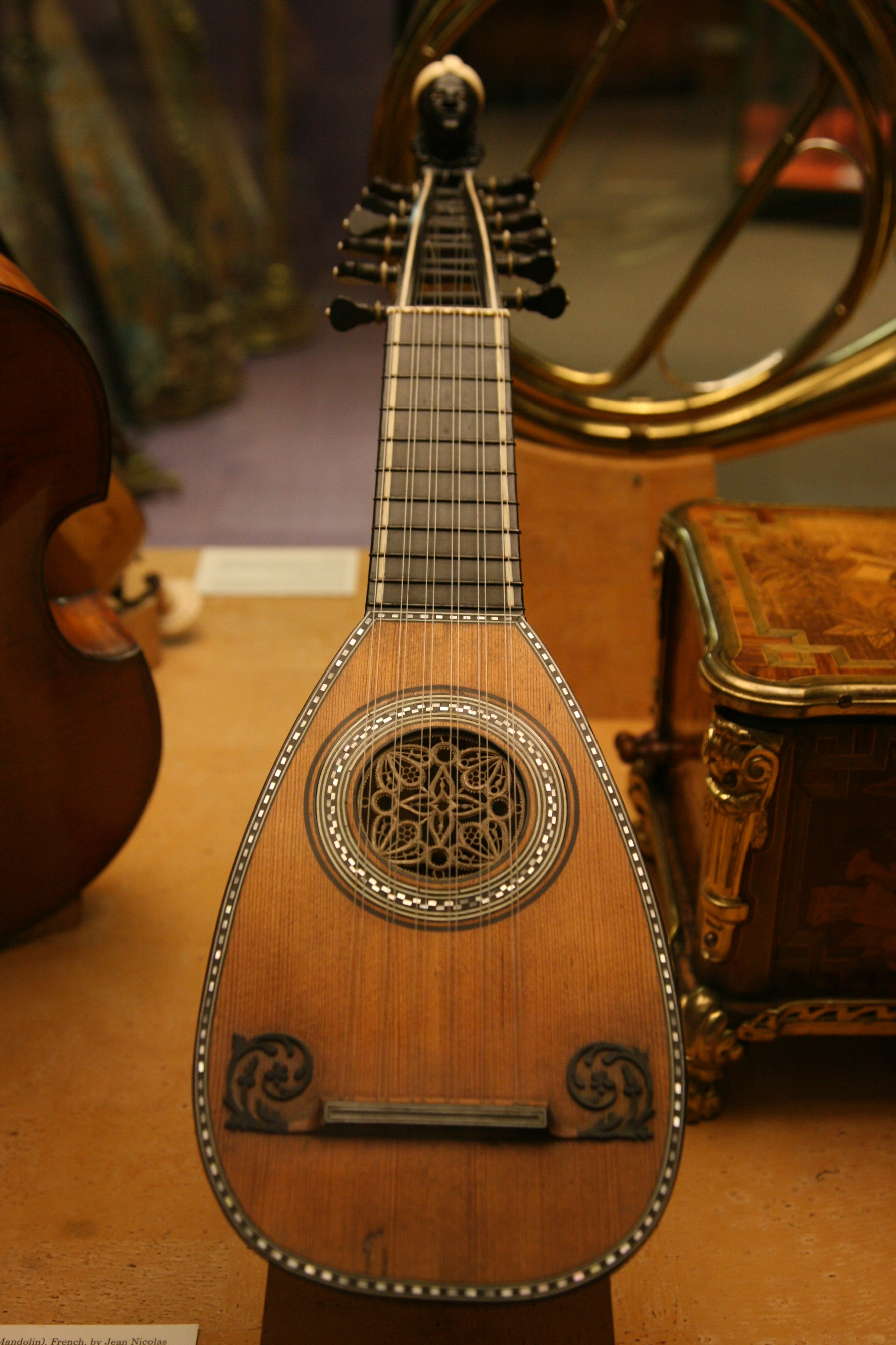
Lombardic mandolin with 12 strings in 6 courses. The bridge is glued to the soundboard, like a guitar's bridge

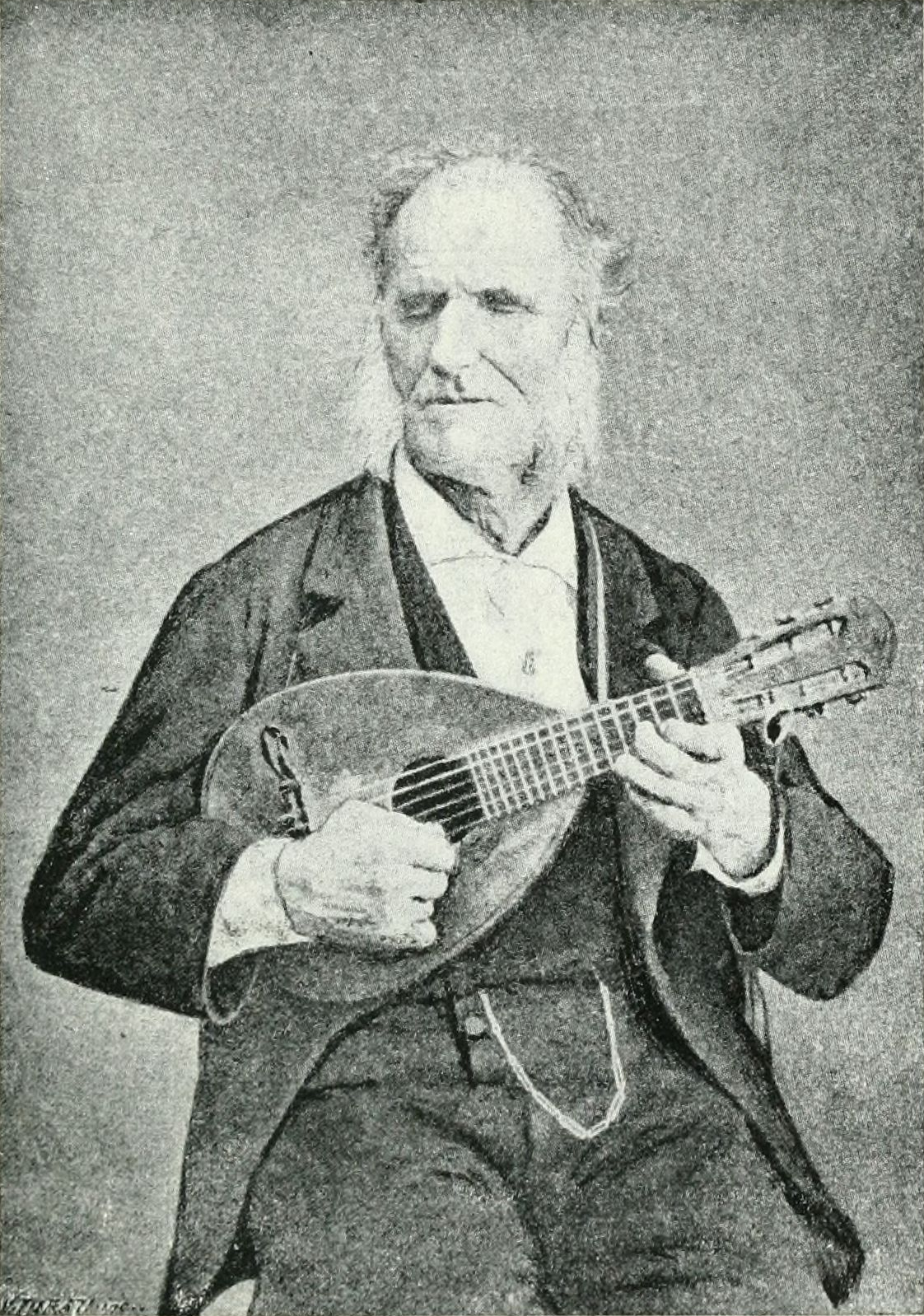
Giovanni Vailati, "Blind mandolinist of Cremona," toured Europe in the 1850s with a six-string Lombardy mandolin.

The mandore is a musical instrument, a small member of the lute family, teardrop shaped, with four to six courses of gut strings and pitched in the treble range. Considered a French instrument, with much of the surviving music coming from France, it was used across "Northern Europe" including Germany and Scotland. Although it went out of style, the French instrument has been revived for use in classical music. The instrument's most commonly played relatives today are members of the mandolin family and the bandurria.

The mandore arrived in France from Spain, and was considered a new instrument in French music books from the 1580s, but can be seen as a development of the gittern. In Spain the mandore was called vandola. Musicologist James Tyler said that the Spanish bandurria with three strings was the mandore, although it had four strings when it arrived in France. In its Spanish form the bandurria may have resembled the rebec.

The mandore was played widely across Europe, just as the earlier gittern had been. The Italians called it the mandola and even as the instrument became obsolete elsewhere, by the mid 17th century they had developed it into "an instrument with its own distinct tuning, technique and music." In Milan, Italy as the mandore or Lombardo, it remained in use into the late 19th century. That variant is known today as the Milanese or Lombardic mandolin, and retains the mandore's tuning. The Italians also called it the mandora or mandola. The latter name is still used in the mandolin family for an alto or tenor range instrument. From the mandola, the baroque mandolino was created, which in turn became the modern mandolin.

The Germans continued to use quinterne, their name for the gittern. Michael Praetorius recorded the names mandürichen, bandürichen, mandoër, mandurinichen, mandörgen, and pandurina. The latter name, pandurina, was also applied in the 1700s in Italy to the Milanese mandolin.

== History ==
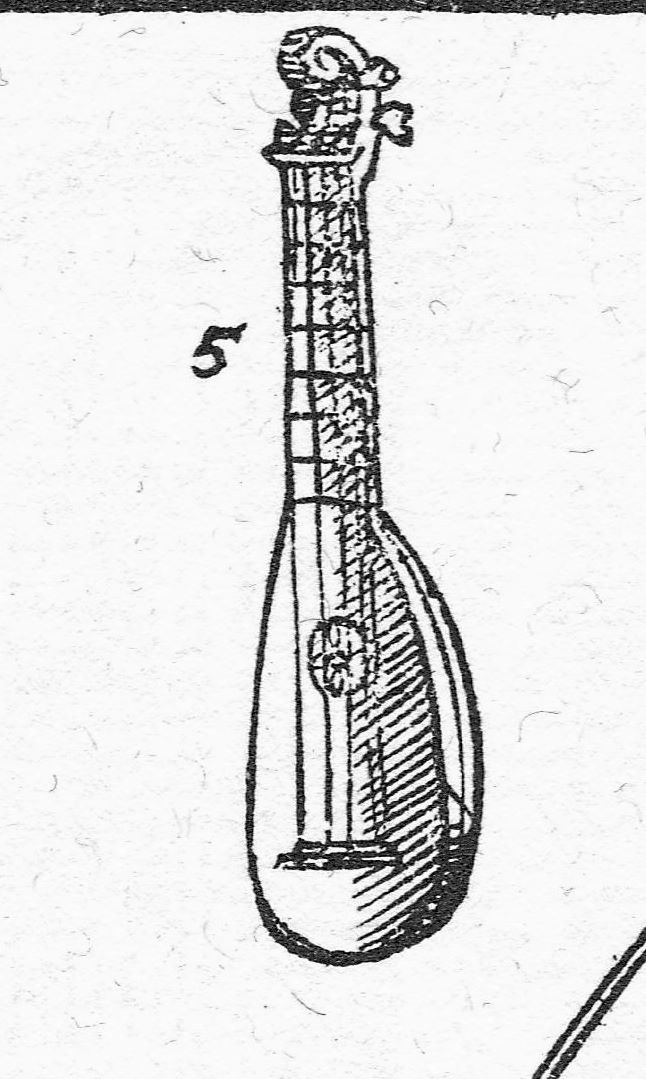
A "Mandörgen" from the 1619 book Syntagma Musicum II by Michael Praetorius. See Praetorius' Plate 16. The instrument appears to have four courses of strings; three single strings and a set of double strings on the right

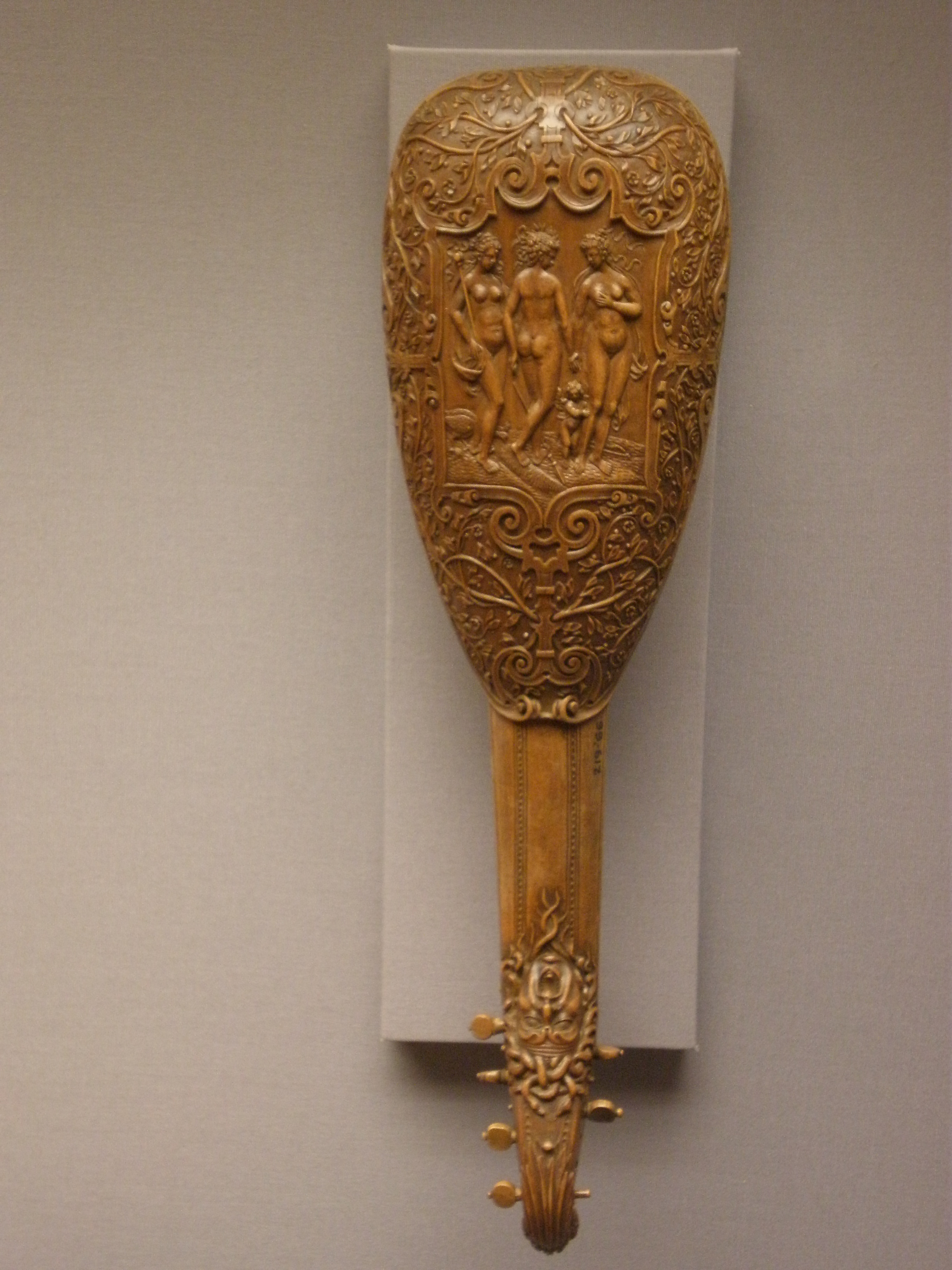
An example of a mandore made by Boissart, in the collections of the Victoria and Albert Museum. The back and neck are one piece, carved from a block of pearwood, and features images of Juno, Minerva and Venus in a beauty contest, the Judgement of Paris. The gargoyle-like head at the bottom is Medusa

Illustrations in the 13th-century Cantigas de Santa Maria show instruments similar to lutes, mandores, mandolas and guitars, being played by European and Islamic players. The instruments moved from Spain northward to France and eastward towards Italy by way of Provence.

Beside the introduction of the lute to Spain (Andalusia) by the Moors, another important point of transfer of the lute from Arabian to European culture was Sicily, where it was brought either by Byzantine or later by Muslim musicians. There were singer-lutenists at the court in Palermo following the Norman conquest of the island from the Muslims, and the lute is depicted extensively in the ceiling paintings in the royal Cappella Palatina in Palermo, dedicated by the Norman King Roger II of Sicily in 1140. His Hohenstaufen grandson Frederick II, Holy Roman Emperor (1194 - 1250) continued integrating Muslims into his court, including Moorish musicians. By the fourteenth century, lutes had disseminated throughout Italy and, probably because of the cultural influence of the Hohenstaufen kings and emperor, the lute made significant inroads into German-speaking lands.

== Construction ==
Like the earlier gittern, the mandore's back and neck were in earlier forms carved out of a block of wood. This "hollowed out construction" did still exist in the 16th century, according to James Tyler, but was becoming rare. The method was being replaced by gluing curved staves together to form back, and adding a neck and peg box.

From Mersenne: The normal length of a mandore is 1 1/2 feet long. It is built as a lute, with "strips of fir or other wood" ... "cut and bent into melon shape" to make a rounded back. The fingerboard is on the same plane as the soundboard, with a bridge glued onto the soundboard. Strings are secured in the pegboard in the neck, pass over the fingerboard and soundboard and are tied to a flat bridge, which is glued to the soundboard. The instrument may have as few as four strings or as many as six. It could also have four to six courses of two strings. The soundhole was covered with a rose, either carved directly into the soundboard or glued in.

== Methods of playing ==
From Marin Mersenne, 1635: A musician plays the mandore "with the finger or the tip of a feather between thumb and index finger or tied to one of the other fingers." "Those who make perfect use of the mandore would move the pick so fast over the strings that they seem to form even chords as they would be if played at the same time."

Another early 17th-century author, Michael Praetorius, agreed. He said, "They play either with a cittern-type quill plectrum, or with one finger - and this with the speed, clarity, and precision that we would expect from the use of three or four fingers. There are some players, however, who start to use two or more fingers once they are familiar with the instrument."

== Tuning ==
=== According to Praetorius ===
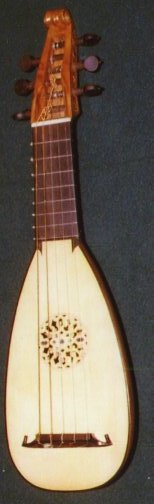
A modern built mandore. This one has five courses of strings; 4 single strings and one set of double strings

Michael Praetorius detailed four tunings for the Mandore in his book Syntagma Musicum in 1619. He listed three tunings (with one repeated) for tuning the mandore. His tuning illustrates tuning for both 4-stringed instruments and 5-stringed instruments.

==== Fifths and fourths ====
The listed tunings using fifths and fourths between strings are:

C-G-C-G
C-G-C-G-C
G-D-G-D

==== Fourths and fifths ====
The listed tuning for fourths and fifths tuning is:

C-F-C-F-C

=== According to Mersenne ===
Mersenne indicates in his book that there were many ways to tune a mandore, but three ways predominated: tuning in unison, tuning with a lowered string, and tuning in a third.

==== Tuning in Unison ====
For a four-string mandore, Mersenne said, "The fourth string is a fifth of the third; the third string is at the fourth of the second, and the second at a fifth from the treble string." In other words, the mandore used a combination of fourths and fifths the courses of strings, such as c-g-c-g.

==== Tuning with a lowered string ====
Mersenne indicated that this was less common than tuning in unison. To tune this way, "the treble string is lowered a tone, so to make a fourth with the third string." In other words, going from tuning c-g-c-g to c-g-c-f.

==== Tuning in a third ====
In tuning a third, one "lowers the treble string down a minor third, so it makes a major third with the third." An example is going from c-g-c-g to c-g-c-e.

=== According to the Skene Manuscript ===
The tunes in the Skene Manuscript are for a mandore tuned in fourths and fifths. Dauney points out in his editing of the Skene Manuscript that the tablature is written strangely, that although it is tabbed for a four-string instrument, it is marked under the bottom line, indicating a five-string instrument:

A-D-A-D-A

and also an older lute tuning in fourths (except between F and A, which is a third):

C-F-A-D-G

== Relationship to other instruments ==
=== Comparison with lute ===
Mandola, mandolino, mandolin
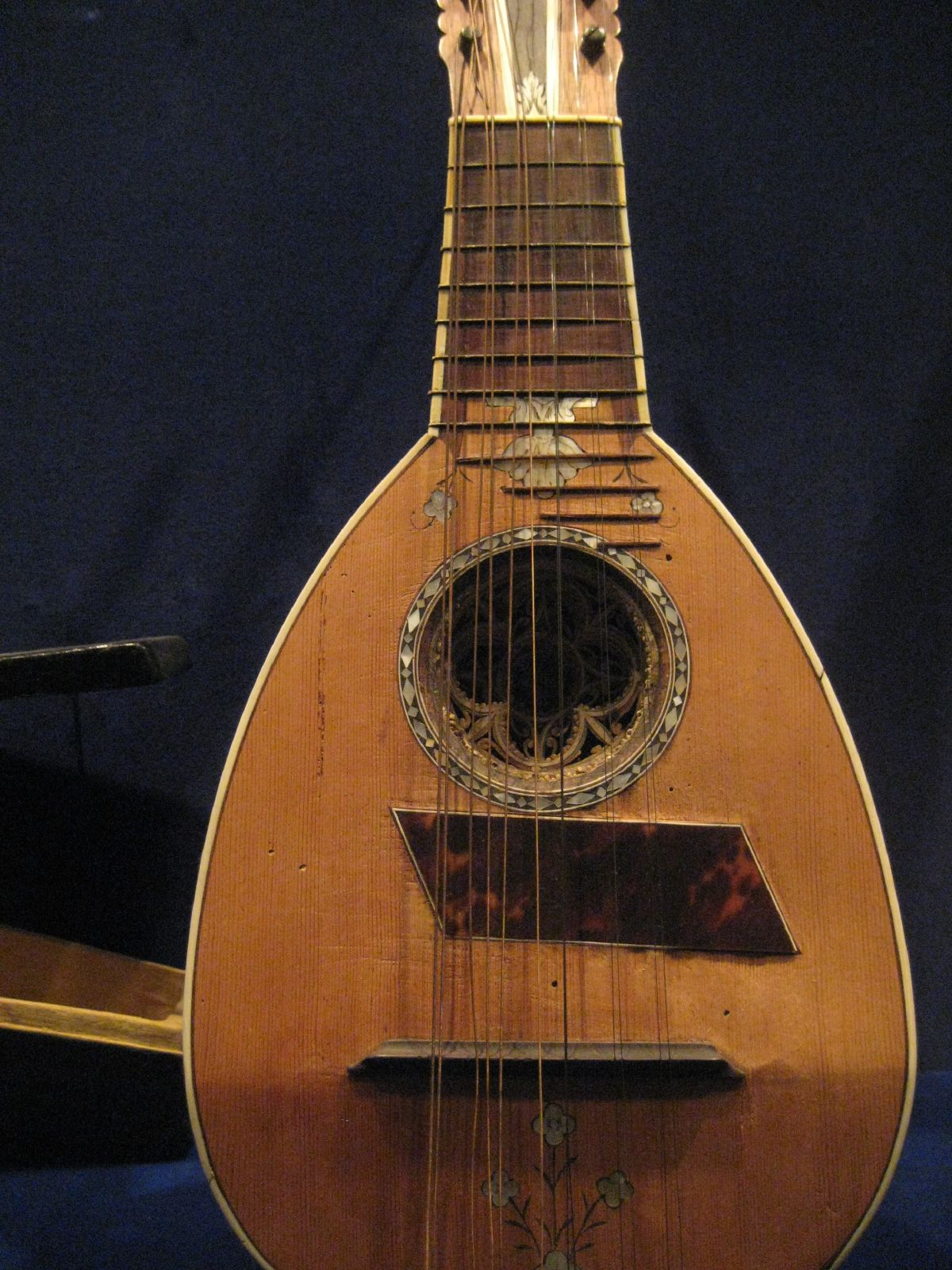
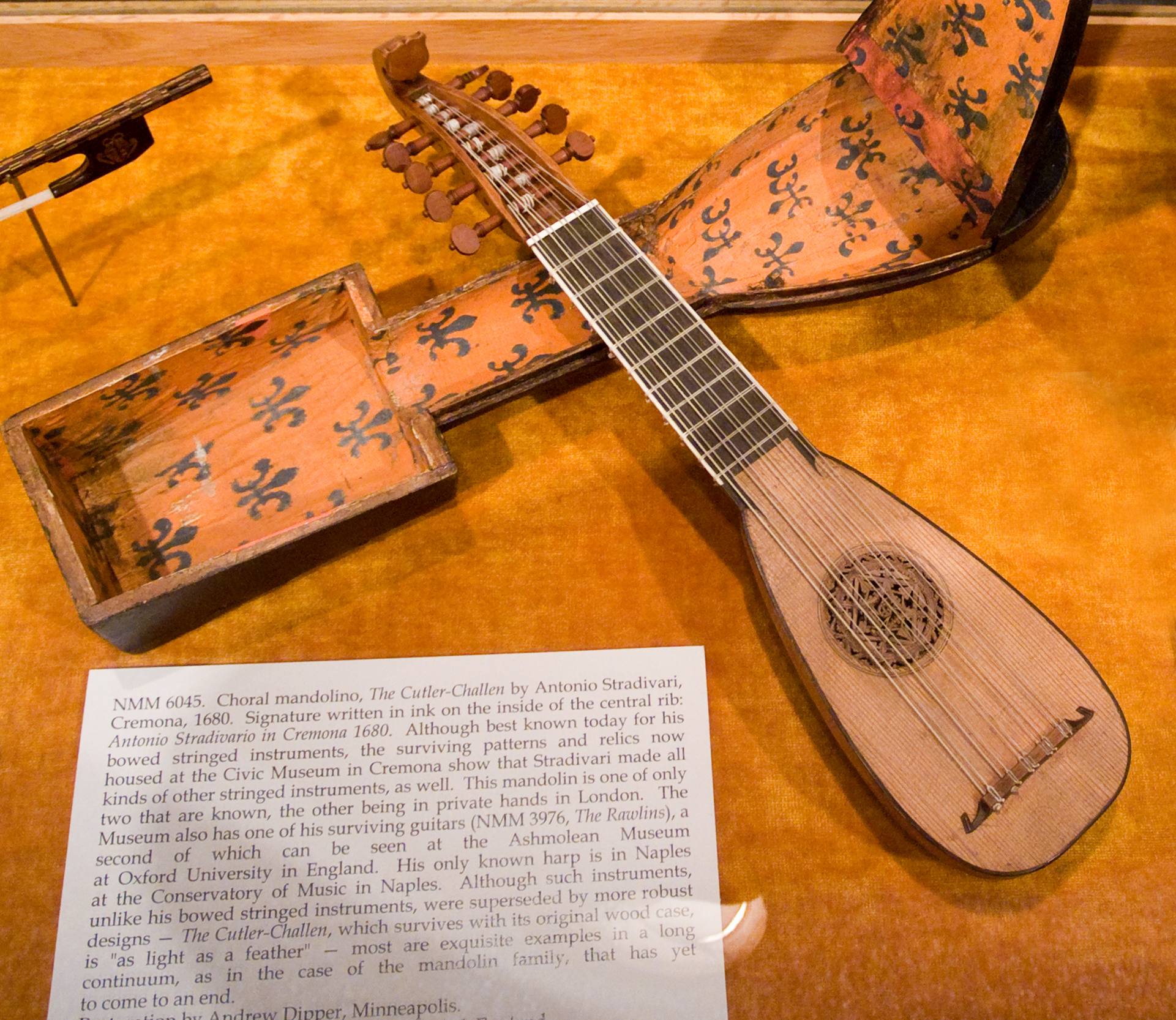
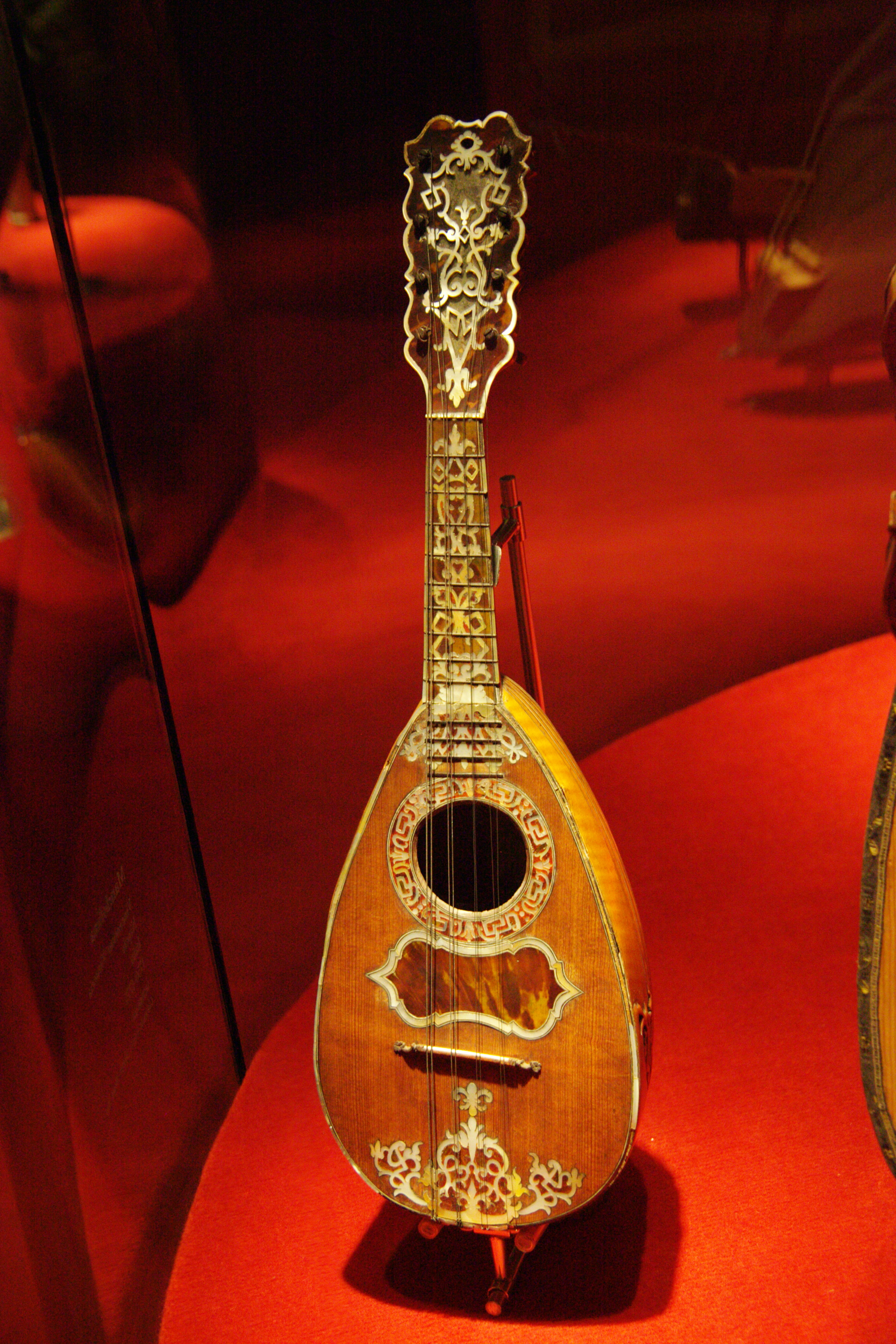
Fltr: 1. Genoese mandola, c. 1750. Mandolino means small mandola; this was the larger (wider) instrument.; 2. Cutler-Challen Choral Mandolino made in Cremona, Italy by Antonio Stradivari, c. 1680, kept at the National Music Museum, Vermillion, South Dakota, made one hundred years after the mandore was being labeled "new" in France; 3. Metal-string mandolin made between 1767 and 1784 by Vicenzo Vinaccia, displayed at the Museu de la Música de Barcelona.

Marin Mersenne ends his section on the mandore in his book Harmonie Universelle by saying, "It is nothing but an abbreviated lute." He said this in the context that one could look at his section on the lute for applicable information. Lutes were larger than mandores, which Mersenne described as miniature. Lutes had more courses of strings and were not restricted to the high treble range, but could play into the bass range.

Earlier in the section, he compared the lute to the mandore. "Now although the mandore has only four strings, nevertheless one plays it rather above all that is played in a lute, whose chorus it covers because of the liveliness and sharpness of its tone, which penetrates and so preoccupies the ear that the lutes have trouble being heard." He said that good mandore players were prone to speedy picking, blurring notes together in a rush of speed.

=== Comparison with treble lute ===
Mandores and treble lutes were tuned differently: treble lutes from the 16th and early 17th centuries had six or more courses of strings, tuned to a "4th, a 4th, a major third, a 4th, a fourth."

Though a member of the lute family, it has been said that the mandore was not a treble lute, which had six or more courses and was tuned the same way as mainstream lutes

=== Comparison with mandola and mandolino ===
To a layman, images of the mandola and mandore show no obvious differences, when comparing two instruments from the same time period. One visible difference was that the mandola and mandolino commonly used double courses of strings, where illustrations of the mandore commonly show single strings. A less visible difference was in the tuning: the Italian mandola and smaller mandolino were tuned entirely in fourths, the mandola using e'-a'-d"-g" (or if using a 5 or 6 course instrument g-b-e'-a'-d"-g"); the French mandore used combinations of fourths and fifths, such as c-g-c-g or c-f-c-f. As the instruments developed, they became physically less similar. By the 17th century, makers such as Antonio Stradivarius had two styles of instrument patterns, with the mandola having strings almost twice as long as the mandolino's.

Two styles of mandolas have made it into museums, flat-backed and bowl-backed. Flat-backed mandolas resemble citterns. Bowl-backed mandolas resemble mandores. One example that has survived of a bowl-backed mandola is that made by Vicenti di Verona in 1696, held by the Hungarian National Museum, Budapest, Hungary. By looks alone, telling the bowl-backed mandola from the mandore can be a challenge.

=== Comparison with Neapolitan mandolin ===
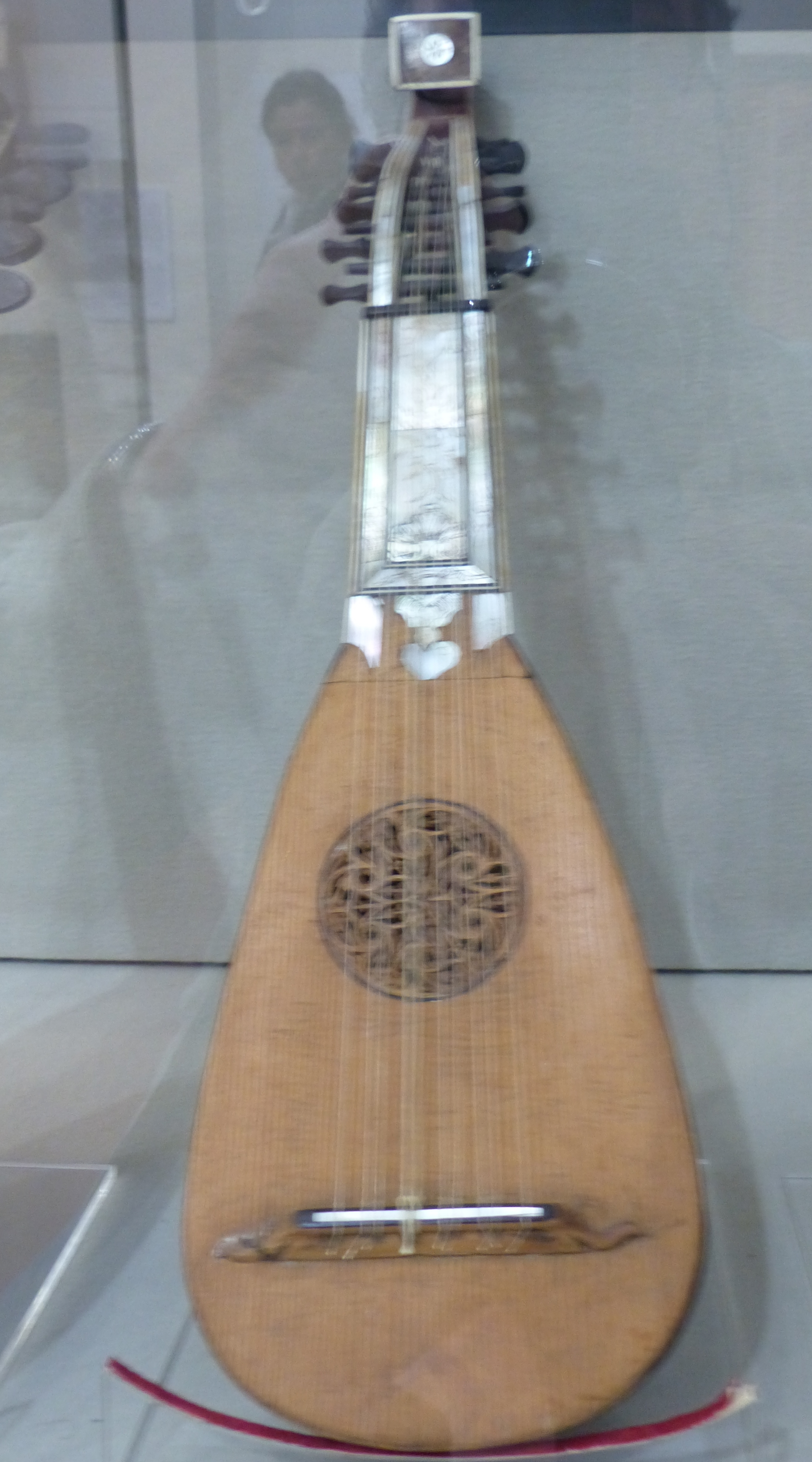
A mandora with the paper or carved wood rose over the sound hole

Pictures and illustrations of the mandore show an instrument that at a casual look, appears very similar to lutes and the later mandolins. The mandore differs from the Neapolitan mandolin in not having a raised fretboard and in having a flat soundboard. Also, It was strung with gut strings, attached to a bridge that is glued to the soundboard (similar to that of a modern guitar). It was played with the fingertips.

In contrast, the Neapolitan mandolin's soundboard is bent. It uses metal strings attached to the end of the instrument, crossing over a bridge that pushes downwards into the bent soundboard.

The differences in design reflect progress in a technological push for louder instruments. If the mandore's gut-strings were tightened too much they broke, but metal strings could pull the fixed bridge off the soundboard, or damage the soundboard. The bend in the Neapolitan's soundboard (new technology at the time) let the soundboard take the pressure of metal strings, driving the bridge down into the soundboard. The result was a louder instrument with less fragile strings. The metal strings are played with a plectrum, creating even more volume. Mandolins are tuned in fifths, typically g-d-a-e for a four-string mandolin.

=== Comparison with bandola ===
Another group of related instruments to the mandore are the vandola or bandola, the bandurria and the bandolim, of Spanish origin, also played in Portugal and South America.

In 1761, Joan Carles Amat said of the vandola, in his Guitarra espanola, y vandola, "the vandola with six courses is described here, because it is the more perfect form of the instrument, and better known and more widely used at this time than that with four or five courses".

=== Comparison with Scottish mandora ===
A principal source of music for the Scottish variant of the instrument can be found in The Ancient Melodies of Scotland by William Dauney. This book is a history of Scottish music, and contains some information on the mandora. Dauney makes it clear that the mandora (which he also calls the mandour) for which the tunes in the Skene Manuscript are written, is the same instrument that Mersenne called the mandore.

Like the mandora described above, it is in "lute" form, but it is a tenor instrument of five paired courses. The string length is variable, like all of the lute family, but generally in the range of 32 to 36 cm. Tuning patterns are unique, the intervals between courses being alternating fourths and fifths, for example d-g-d'-g'-d", as Pretorius Syntagma Musicum mandore's tuning (1619). There is a book of tunes in French tablature from about 1620 called The Skene Mandora Book, available on microfilm as a loan to members of the Lute Society of America, or as part of The Ancient Melodies of Scotland, available through Google Books.

A principal source of music for the Scottish variant of the instrument can be found in The Ancient Melodies of Scotland by William Dauney. This book is a history of Scottish music, and contains some information on the mandora. Dauney makes it clear that the mandora the Skene Manuscript tunes are written for is the same instrument that Mersenne called the "mandore".

== Name controversy ==
While the mandore and mandora have been considered equivalent names for the same treble-ranged instrument, mandora has also found use as the name for a bass-ranged lute, the gallichon.

The instrument has also been mistakenly called mandöraen instead of mandörgen by modern readers of Praetorius' book. However, the "raen" in the word is actually "rgen". The error is due to a lithographic fault in reproducing plate 16; that fault truncated the g into an a. The error can be seen when comparing two different versions of the plate (compare the two versions in the file history).

== Composers ==
- Renaissance mandore: Martin Agricola, Pierre Brunet, Adrian Le Roy, Ottomar Luscinius, Sebastian Virdung et al.
- 17th century mandore: François de Chancy, Henry François de Gallot, Valentin Strobel, Maitrise von François-Pierre Goy et al.
- 18th century mandora: Johann Georg Albrechtsberger, Giuseppe Antonio Brescianello, Johann Paul Schiffelholz et al.

== Bibliography ==
- D. Gill: "Mandore and Calachon", FoMRHI Quarterly, no. 19 (1980), p. 61–63
- D. Gill: "Mandores and Colachons", Galpin Society Journal, p. xxxiv (1981), p. 130–41
- D. Gill: "Alternative Lutes: the Identity of 18th-Century Mandores and Gallichones", The Lute, xxvi (1986), p. 51–62
- D. Gill: "The Skene Mandore Manuscript", The Lute, xxviii (1988), 19–33
- D. Gill: "Intabulating for the Mandore: Some Notes on a 17th-Century Workbook", The Lute, xxxiv (1994), p. 28–36
- C. Hunt: "History of the Mandolin"; Mandolin World News Vol 4, No. 3, 1981
- A. Koczirz: "Zur Geschichte der Mandorlaute"; Die Gitarre 2 (1920/21), p. 21–36
- Marin Mersenne: Harminie Universelle: The Books on Instruments, Roger E. Chapman trans. (The Hague, 1957)
- E. Pohlmann: Laute, Theorbe, Chitarrone; Bremen, 1968 (1982)
- M. Prynne: "James Talbot's Manuscript, IV: Plucked Strings – the Lute Family", Galpin Society Journal, xiv (1961), p. 52–68
- James Tyler and Paul Sparks: The Early Mandolin: the Mandolino and the Neapolitan Mandoline, Oxford Early Music Series, Clarendon Press 1992, ISBN 978-0198163022
- James Tyler: The Early Guitar: a History and Handbook Oxford Early Music Series, Oxford University Press, 1980, ISBN 978-0193231825
