= Guitarra =

Guitarra may refer to:

- Gittern, a medieval string instrument
- Guitarra Portuguesa, a traditional Portuguese string instrument used in Fado music
