= James Tyler (musician) =

American musician (1940–2010)

- Born: August 3, 1940
- Origin: Hartford, Connecticut, USA
- Died: November 23, 2010 (aged 70)
- Occupations: musicologist, author, composer
- Instruments: lute, banjo, guitar, cittern, mandora
- Years active: 1960s–2010
- Labels: Arpeggio, L'Oiseau-Lyre, Nonesuch, Saga, RCA, Decca, others

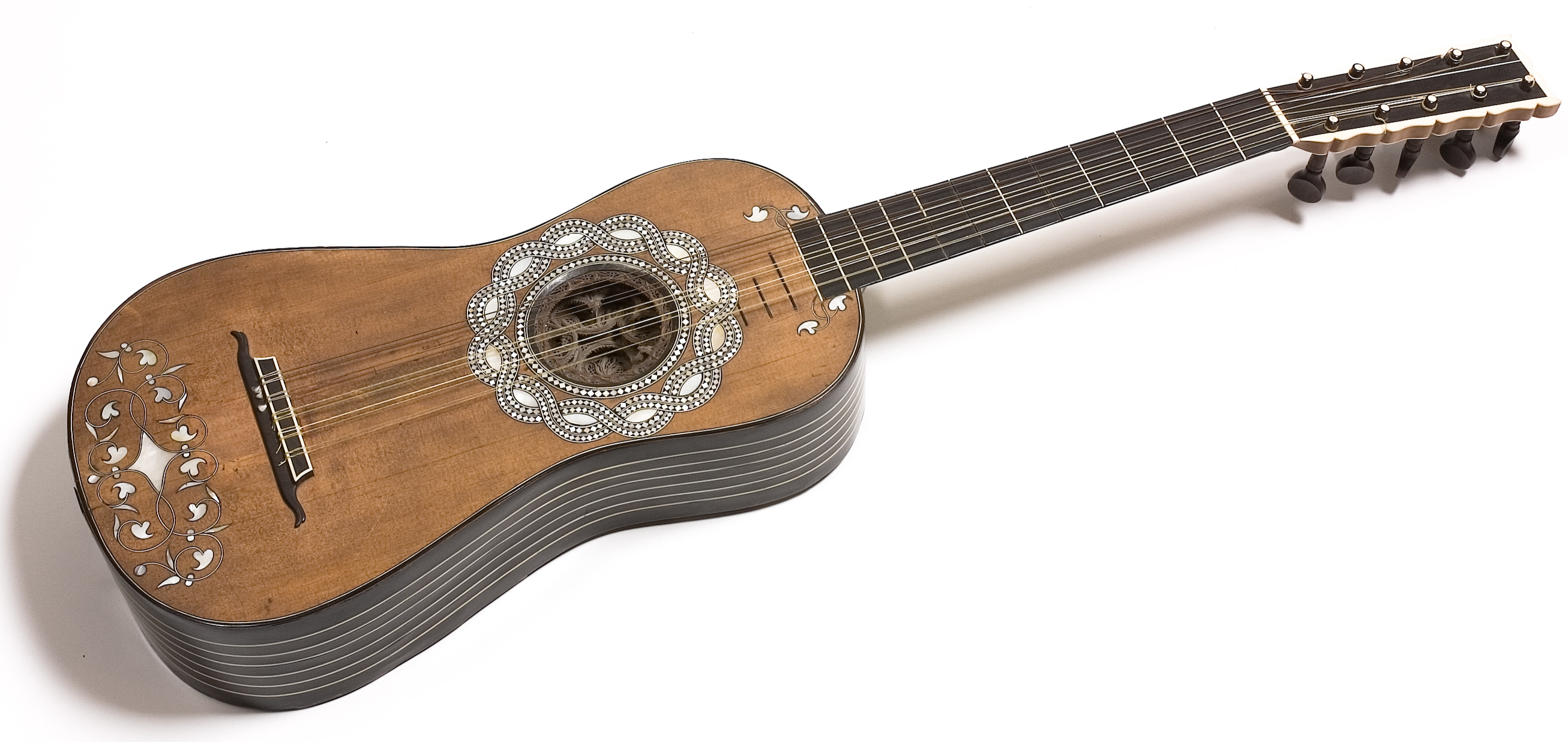
Baroque guitar by Matteo Seelos (before 1653)

James Tyler (August 3, 1940 – November 23, 2010) was a 20th-century American lutenist, banjoist, guitarist, composer, musicologist and author, who helped pioneer an early music revival with more than 60 recordings.

== Background ==
James Henry Tyler was born in Hartford, Connecticut. His father worked for Pratt-Whitney. Initially, he studied the banjo (classic 5-string and tenor) and Mandolin with Walter K. Bauer (1954–1958), then the lute with Joseph Iadone (1958–1961) and mandoline with Martha Blackman. He also played the cello.

== Career ==
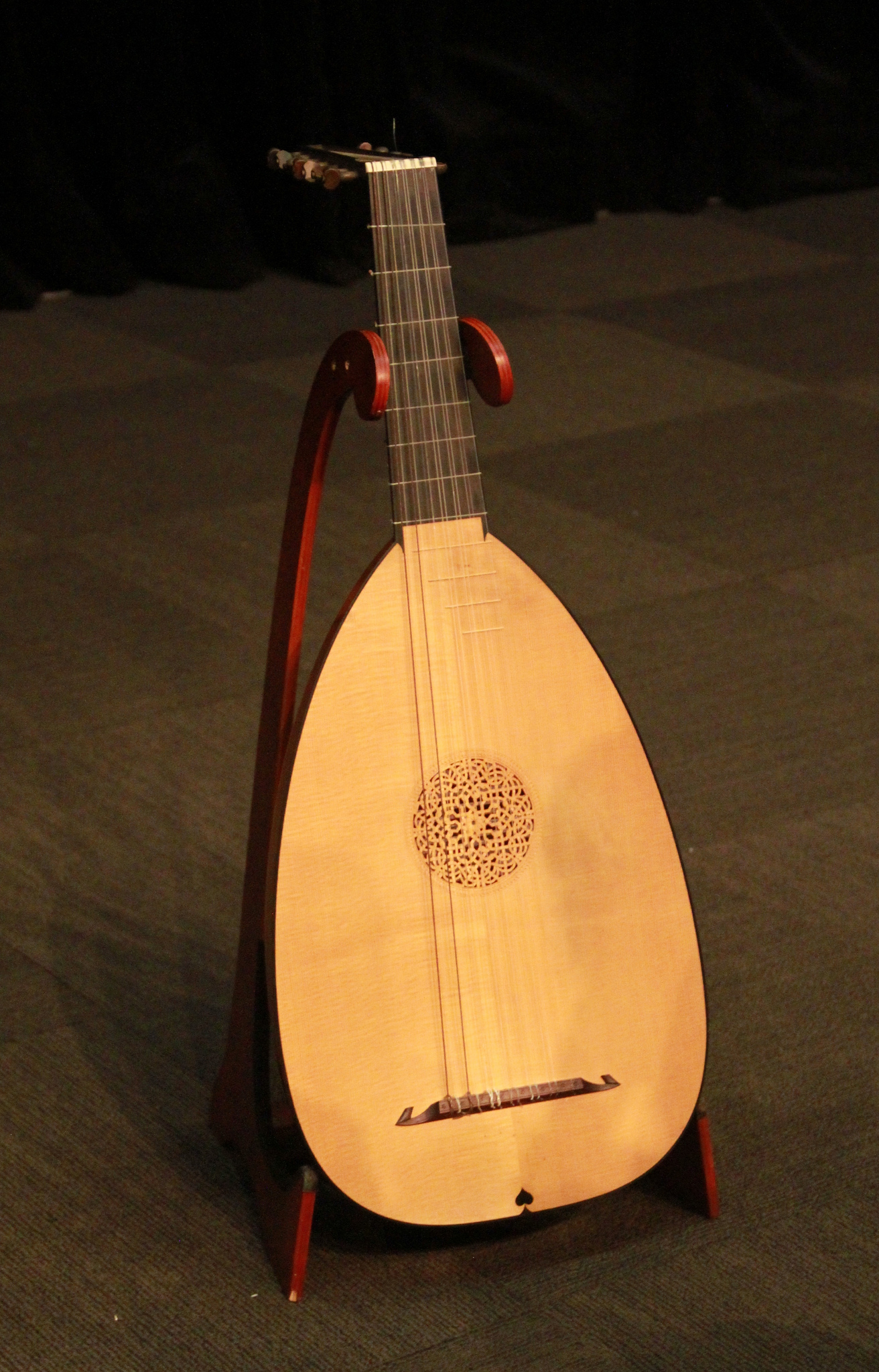
Renaissance Lute.

=== Musician ===
As a lutenist, Tyler performed and recorded with New York Pro Musica, with whom he first recorded. He performed with Sidney Beck's Consort Players and, in 1963, played with them at the White House for U.S. President John F. Kennedy. He also toured and recorded as a banjoist with "Max Morath and the Original Rag Quartet." In 1968, he studied early music in Germany, where he played with Studio der Frühen Musik.

In 1969, his interest in early music took him to London. During the 1970s and 1980s, he performed and recorded in London with Anthony Rooley, Musica Reservata, the Consort of Musicke, the Julian Bream Consort and the Early Music Consort of London under David Munrow.

In 1975, he formed the "New Excelsior Talking Machine," a ragtime ensemble for which he played banjo. In 1977, he founded the "London Early Music Group," an early music ensemble which lasted until 1990.

He composed music for BBC television productions of Shakespeare plays, including The Good Old Days.

He appeared as a lutenist in the 1971 film, Mary Queen of Scots. He also made a recording of a Vivaldi mandolin concerto for a part live-action, part animated film Looney Tunes Back in Action (2003).

=== Academic ===
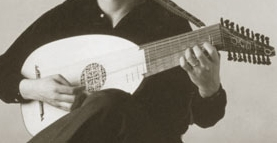
Renaissance lute (holding position)

In 1986, he became professor of music and director of the master's and doctoral degree programs in Early Music Performance at the University of Southern California (USC), a post he held until retiring in 2006. Apart from the instruments mentioned, he was considered an expert on the Renaissance and Baroque guitars. As a musicologist he travelled around Europe and the US researching and transcribing hundreds of early music works. He authored several books on early plucked instruments and their music (see bibliography), and wrote articles for various publications. He retired from teaching in 2006.

== Personal and death ==
In 1975, Tyler married Joyce Geller in London.

Tyler provided "very gentle leadership, always had a jolly smile on his face and was always positive," one of his USC students said in tribute.

James Tyler died at age 70 on November 23, 2010, after a short illness.

== Legacy ==
In addition to many books on early music and recordings, Tyler left a legacy in his students. "He shaped the lives of so many students," said Lucinda Carver, a professor in the early music program at USC. "He was very demanding but extremely kind. He was an impeccable musician who knew what he wanted. He kept very high standards and was an absolutely beloved mentor."

== Works ==
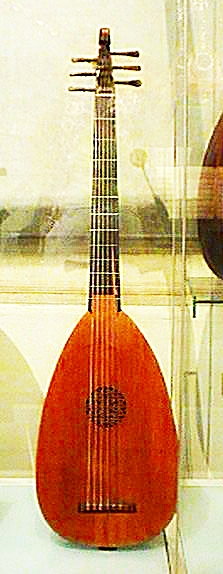
Mandora or Gallichon

=== Books ===
In addition to the following books, Tyler wrote articles for New Grove Dictionaries and Early Music.

- The Early Guitar: A History (Oxford University Press, 1980)
- The Early Mandolin (Oxford University Press, 1992) (with Paul Sparks)
- The Guitar and Its Music: From the Renaissance to the Classical Era (Oxford University Press, 2002/2007) (with Paul Sparks)
- A Guide to Playing the Baroque Guitar (Indiana University Press, 2011)

=== Discography ===
- Max Morath with Jim Tyler: The Entertainer (Arpeggio ARP 1204S, 1968)
- Anthony Rooley - James Tyler: Renaissance Duets (L'Oiseau-Lyre, 1972)
- Anthony Rooley - James Tyler: My Lute Awake! (L'Oiseau-Lyre SOL 336, 1974)
- James Tyler: Music for Merchants and Monarchs (Saga 5420, 1975)
- James Tyler: Music Of The Renaissance Virtuosi (Nonesuch, 1976)
- James Bowman - James Tyler: Songs In Shakespeare's Plays (Archiv Produktion 2533 407, 1978)
- The London Early Music Group - James Tyler: With Pleasure And Delight: Musik Am Hofe Von Heinrich VII. Und Heinrich VIII (RCA Red Seal RL 25223, 1978)
- The London Early Music Group - James Tyler: La Mantovana (Arie E Danze Italiane Del Primo Barocco) (RCA Red Seal, 1978)
- James Tyler: Ragtime (Desto DC 7181, 1979)
- Anthony Rooley, James Tyler: Greensleeves - Lautenmusik der Renaissance (Decca 6.48183 DM, 1981)
- James Tyler and Members Of The London Early Music Group: Elizabethan Social Music (English Consorts, Lute Duets And Solos) (Saga 5479, 1981)
- The London Early Music Group - James Tyler: Italian Airs And Dances (Argo ZRG 923, 1981)
- The London Early Music Group, Francesco Cavalli, Luigi Rossi, Giacomo Carissimi, Claudio Monteverdi, James Tyler: Seventeenth-Century Bel Canto: Arias & Cantatas By Monteverdi, Rossi, Cavalli, Carissimi, Realized & Directed By James Tyler (Nonesuch E1 79109-1, 1985)
- Glenda Simpson, Paul Elliott, Andrew King), London Early Music Group, James Tyler: 17th Century Bel Canto (Arias and Cantatas By Monteverdi, Cavalli, Rossi, Carissimi) (Hyperion A66153, 1985)
- James Tyler and the New Excelsior Talking Machine: Selections by Scott Joplin, Eubie Blake, G.L. Lansing, Johannes Brahms and Others (Decca SKL 5266, 1977)

== See also ==
- Anthony Rooley
- Musica Reservata
- Consort of Musicke
- Julian Bream
- Early Music Consort of London
- lute
- cittern
- mandora
