= Jan Baptist Verrijt =

Dutch composer and organist

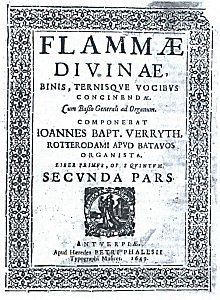
Flammæ divinæ (Antwerp, 1649)

Jan Baptist Verrijt (Rotterdam c.1600-1650) was a Dutch composer and organist of the St. Laurenskerk in Rotterdam.

His works are mainly lost, though his Opus 5 was rediscovered in the 1980s.

== Works, editions and recordings ==
Flammae divinae, Op. 5 Motets - recording by Consort of Musicke dir. Anthony Rooley, NM.
