= Mandola =

Musical instrument

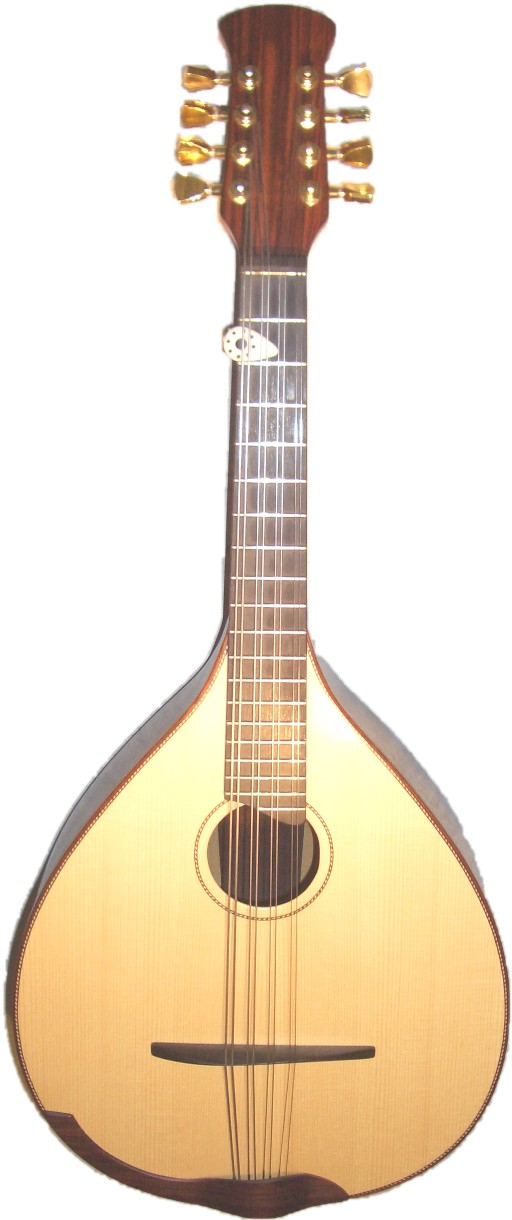
- Other names: Tenor mandolin, Alto mandola, Alto mandolin, Mandoliola, Liola
- Classification: String instrument (plucked)
- Hornbostel–Sachs classification: 321.322 (Composite chordophone)

Playing range
- C3-D6 or E6

Related instruments
- List: Family: Mandolin; Mandola; Octave mandolin; Mandocello; Mandobass Related: Baglamas; Bouzouki; Irish bouzouki

The mandola (US and Canada) or tenor mandola (Ireland and UK) is a fretted, stringed musical instrument. It is to the mandolin what the viola is to the violin: the four double courses of strings tuned in fifths to the same pitches as the viola (C_{3}-G_{3}-D_{4}-A_{4}), a fifth lower than a mandolin. The mandola, though now rarer, is an ancestor of the mandolin. (The word mandolin means little mandola.)

== Overview ==
The name mandola may originate with the ancient pandura, and is also rendered as mandora, the change perhaps having been due to approximation to the Italian word for "almond". The instrument developed from the lute at an early date, being more compact and cheaper to build, but the sequence of development and nomenclature in different regions is now hard to discover. Historically related instruments include the mandore, mandole, vandola (Joan Carles Amat, 1596), bandola, bandora, bandurina, pandurina and – in 16th-century Germany – the quinterne or chiterna.

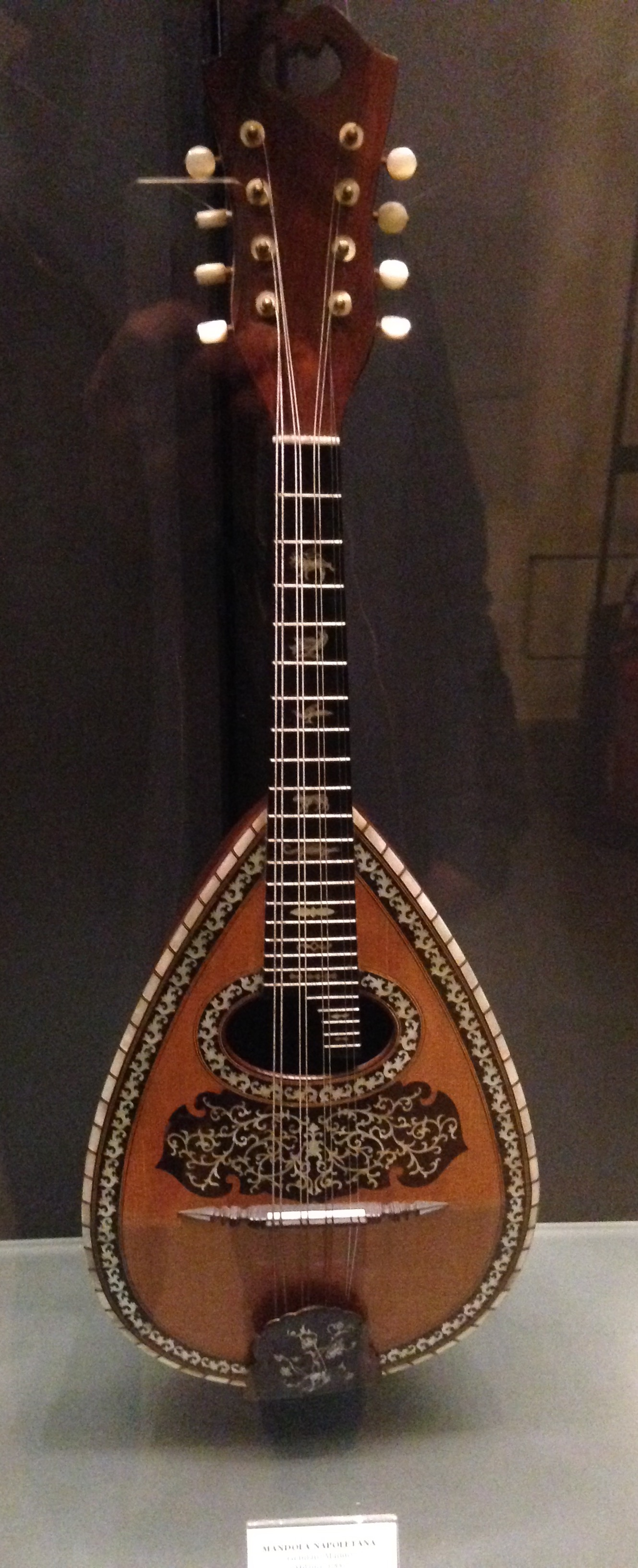
Bowl-backed mandola

However, significantly different instruments have at times and places taken on the same or similar names, and the "true" mandola has been strung in several different ways.

The mandola has four double courses of metal strings, tuned in unison. The scale length is typically around 42 cm (16.5 inches). The mandola is typically played with a plectrum (pick). The double strings accommodate a sustaining technique called tremolando, a rapid alternation of the plectrum on a single course of strings.

The mandola is commonly used in folk music—particularly Italian folk music. It is sometimes played in Irish traditional music, but the instruments octave mandolin, Irish bouzouki and modern cittern are more commonly used. Some Irish traditional musicians, following the example of Andy Irvine, restring the tenor mandola with lighter, mandolin strings and tune it F-C-G-C (two semi-tones lower than G-D-A-D, since the mandola's fretboard is two frets longer than the mandolin's), while others (Brian McDonagh of Dervish being the best known) use alternate tunings such as D-A-E-A. Like the guitar, the mandola can be acoustic or electric. Attila the Stockbroker, punk poet and frontman of Barnstormer, uses an electric mandola as his main instrument, and Lief Sørbye of the band Tempest play an electric, double-neck mandola/mandolin. Alex Lifeson, guitarist of Rush, has also featured the mandola in his work.

Mandolas are sometimes played in mandolin orchestras, along with other members of the mandolin family: mandolin, mandocello and mandobass. Sometimes the octave mandolin (also referred to as an octave mandola) is included as well.

== Bibliography ==
- Troughton, John (2005). Mandolin Manual: The Art, Craft and Science of the Mandolin and Mandola. United States: Crowood Press, Limited, The. ISBN 1-86126-496-8. — A comprehensive chord dictionary.
- Richards, Tobe A. (2005). The Tenor Mandola Chord Bible: CGDA Standard Tuning 1,728 Chords. United Kingdom: Cabot Books. ISBN 0-9553944-2-2. — A comprehensive chord dictionary.
- Loesberg, John (1989). Chords for Mandolin, Irish Bango, Bouzouki, Mandola, Mamdocello. Rep. of Ireland: Random House. ISBN 0-946005-47-8. — A chord book featuring 20 pages of popular chords.
