= Pierre Brunet (musician) =

Sixteenth century french musician

Pierre Brunet was a French musician who lived in Paris during the middle of the sixteenth century, a teacher of the mandola in that city. He is the author of a Tablature de Mandore, which was published by Adrien le Roy, Paris, in 1578. Mandore is the ancient name of an instrument similar to the mandola — the tenor instrument of the mandolin family — the mandore or mandola being of earlier origin than the mandolin. His was the first book published for the mandore, but is now lost.
