= Joseph Iadone =

American musician

Joseph Iadone (September 5, 1914 – March 23, 2004) was an American lutenist who was a member of various bands, including New York Pro Musica, Renaissance Quartet, and Iadone Consort.

== Early life ==
Joseph Iadone attended Yale University, while studying with composer Paul Hindemith, Hindemith suggested that Iadone take the lute.

== Career ==
In the late 1950s, Iadone helped James Tyler study the lute.

== Death ==
On March 23, 2004, Iadone died at a retirement home in New Haven, Connecticut.
