= Mandora =

Type of bass lute from the 1700s

Mandora or Gallichon

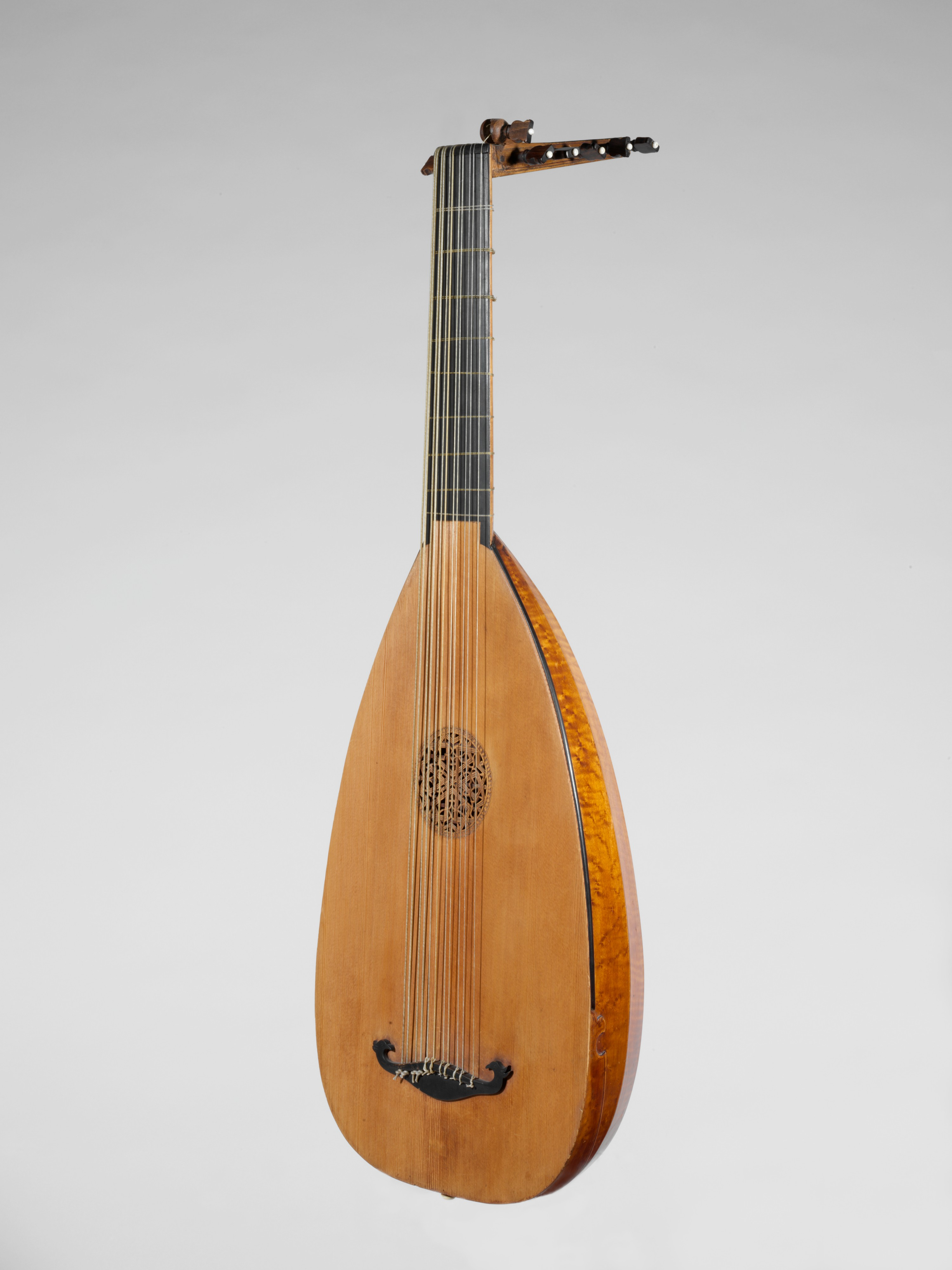
Mandora (1726)

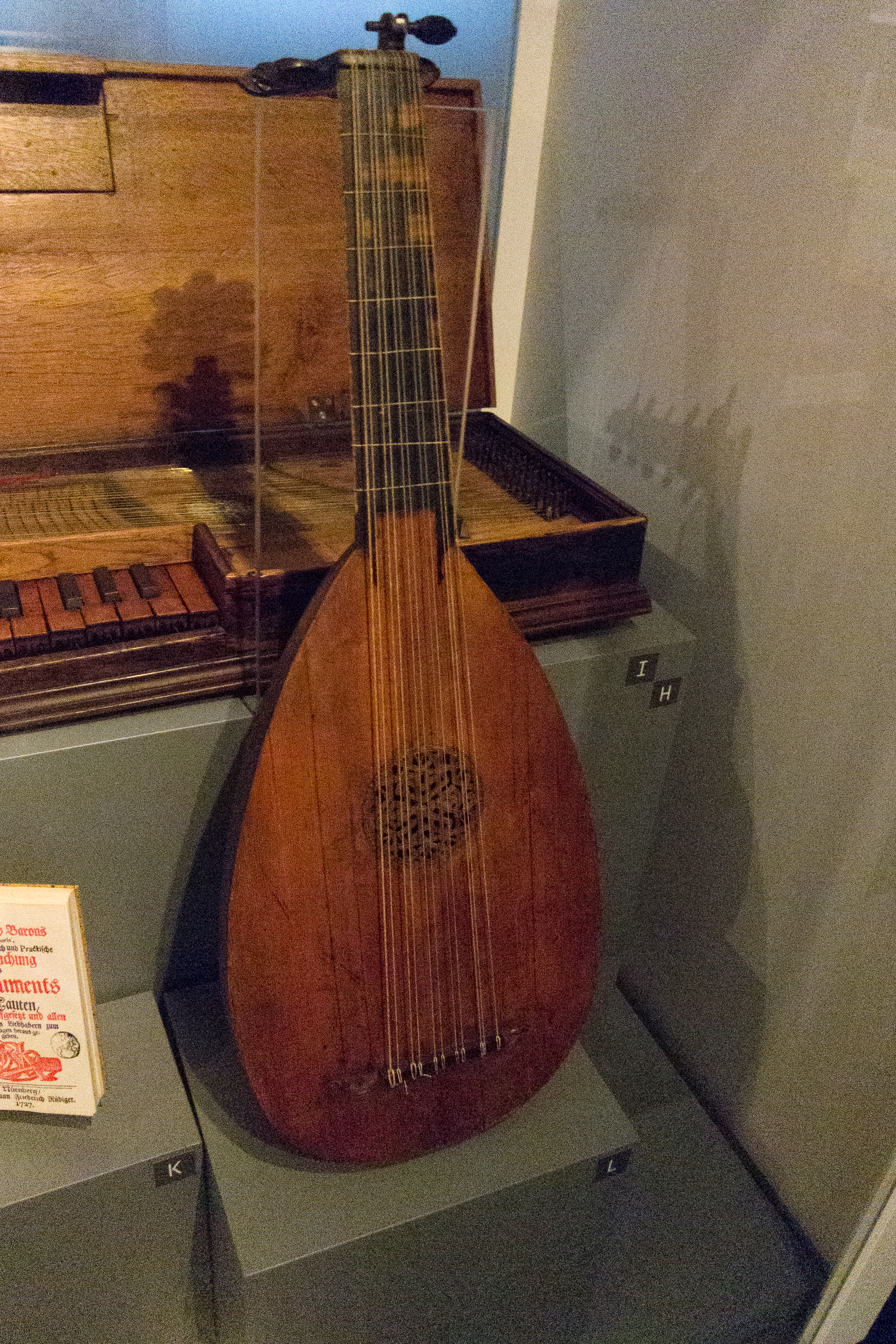
6~9 courses lute (Calchedon, Calichon) (1735)

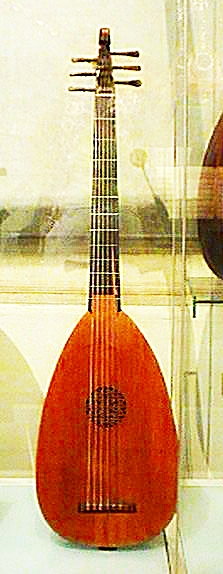
Gallichon

The mandora or gallichon is a type of 18th- and early 19th-century lute, with six to nine courses of strings. The terms were interchangeable, with mandora more commonly used from the mid-18th century onwards.

== History ==
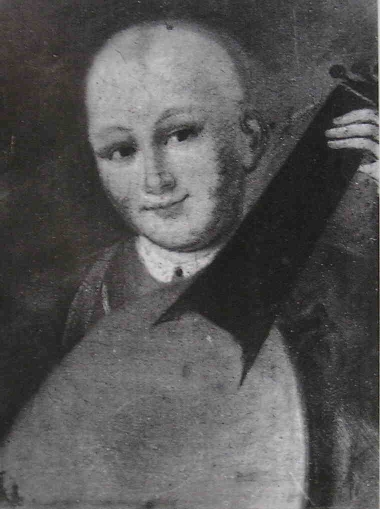
A Ukrainian Cossack with a Mandora, c.1750

Mandora or gallichon generally refers to a bass lute from the 1700s, with a vibrating string length of 72 centimeters or greater, used in Germany and Bohemia. It could be either single- or double-strung.

James Tyler pointed out in his book The Early Mandolin that the word mandora was rarely encountered before the 18th century. Then, it referred to a large bass lute. The gallichone, as it was better known, was a type of 6- or 8-course bass lute (possibly a descendant of the guiterne and/or chitarra italiana) used, mainly for basso continuo, in Germany, Austria and Bohemia particularly during the 18th and early 19th centuries. It was also called the galizona, galichon or caledon. Tyler disputed that it was mainly used for continuo, saying it was used "both as a solo and as a continuo instrument". The instrument was popular in the 18th century and there are various surviving instruments and manuscript sources (see below), mainly from Germany. The mandora often had only 6 courses, resulting in a simpler technique than the complex and difficult 13-course lute, so was more suitable for amateur players. Similar instruments were also in use in northern Italy, although generally referred to as "liuto" (lute) rather than mandora.

Composers for the gallichon/mandora include Johann Paul Schiffelholz and Telemann, as well as Ruggero Chiesa (1933–1993) in the modern era. Chiesa called the instrument the colascione, incorrectly as the colascione is a different instrument. Gottfried Finger suggested that it was used in Boheman musical circles. The mandora was still in use in the early 19th century, particularly in Vienna and the Bavarian town Eichstätt. The Viennese guitarist Simon Molitor mentions the mandora several times in his early 19th century writings and says that by that time mandoras had 8 single strings.

== Construction ==
The bass type, similarly to the theorbo and other baroque lutes, has a vaulted body (shell) constructed of separate ribs, a flat soundboard with either a carved rose or one which is inset into the soundhole, and a bridge (without a saddle) consisting of a wooden bar acting as a string-holder glued to the soundboard. Unique to this instrument is the neck, which is long enough to allow for 10 to 12 tied gut frets. The pegbox is either straight and set at a sharp angle to the neck (much like a lute pegbox), or gently curving and set at a shallow angle, either case being fitted with laterally-inserted tuning pegs (although sometimes a flat pegboard with sagittal pegs is found). The strings were of gut and are strung either singly or, especially on Italian instruments, in double courses. However, on German-made instruments, the first course (highest in pitch) is usually single (a chanterelle) and often has its own separate raised peg rider/holder attached to the pegbox. The number of courses varies from six to eight. Open string lengths tend to be fairly long (62–72 cm) on German instruments, but shorter (55–65 cm) on late Italian ones, probably because they tended to be tuned to a higher pitch.

Luthiers who produced mandoras in the first half of the 18th century were Gregor Ferdinand Wenger in Augsburg, Jacob Goldt of Hamburg, Jacob Weiss of Salzburg, David Buchstetter of Regensburg and Mattias Greisser of Innsbruck. Italian-style instruments are represented by Martino Hell of Genoa, Enrico Ebar of Venice, David Tecchler of Rome, Antonio Scoti of Milan and, toward the end of the century, Antonio Monzino and Giuseppe Presbler of Milan.

At least 50 original instruments survive in collections around the world. Examples are found in museums in Berlin, Claremont (California), Copenhagen, Edinburgh, The Hague, Leipzig, Milan, Munich and Paris, New York and St. Petersburg. Many of these instruments are found in a more or less unaltered state, and therefore are often used as models for modern reconstructions.

== Works ==
There are about 55 sources of mandora music in tablature, all in manuscript (none printed) and nearly all of Germanic origin. These contain solos, duets, song accompaniments, and chamber music. Few studies have appeared, and very little of the music has been transcribed and published: critical editions are especially rare. Many have no composers attributed but in recent years studies of concordances are beginning to uncover music by composers such as Silvius Leopold Weiss and Johann Anton Logy. The sources do mention some composers' names; Duke Clement of Bavaria, Placidus von Camerloher, Johann Paul Schiffelholz, Joseph (Josef) Michael Zink, Andrea Mayr, Giuseppe Antonio Brescianello and others. Other composers include Georg Philipp Telemann who wrote 6 concerti for flute, gallichon and strings, Johann Friedrich Daube and Johann Albrechtsberger, whose three concertinos for ‘mandora’, ‘crembalum’ (jaw harp) and strings have been performed and recorded. Today there are various modern lutenists who play the mandora and some of these historical works have been recorded. The mandora has also been used in contemporary music; the British lutenist and composer Chris Hirst uses the mandora extensively in his works, often in combination with diverse instruments like the cello, cor anglais and melodica.

== See also ==
- Kobza — Ukrainian lute family instrument relating to Mandora.
- Lute guitar — German guitar family instrument setup on a lute bowl, sometimes converted from lute.
