= Anthony Rooley =

British lutenist

Anthony Rooley (born 10 June 1944 in Leeds) is a British lutenist.

== Career ==
In 1969, Rooley founded and directed the early music ensemble The Consort of Musicke, which continues to be one of the chief vehicles for his inspiration, among many other activities and interests. He has recorded extensively and continues to perform solo and duo repertoire with sopranos Evelyn Tubb and former partner Emma Kirkby.

Anthony was appointed York Early Music Festival vice president in 2008. He continues regular work as a visiting professor at the Schola Cantorum Basiliensis, where he is director of AVES - Advanced Vocal Ensemble Studies. Most recently he has been appointed a visiting professor at the Orpheus Institute, Ghent, under the heading "Developing a Practical Philosophy of Performance." In 2003, 2005 and 2007 he undertook four-month residencies at Florida State University, holding graduate seminars and directing productions. In 2003 this included a fully staged version of Semele by John Eccles; in 2005 a ‘first’ Conference on John Eccles; 2007 focused on The Passions of William Hayes.

Writing and research are of great importance, to develop and extend the repertoire; plans for the future include more time for writing. Recently, Anthony has turned to the 18th and 19th centuries, as part of his continuing project to search out the best of forgotten English music. In 2004 he directed performances, live and on CD, of the madrigals and part-songs of Robert Lucas Pearsall, and in 2005 The Passions by Handel’s contemporary and champion, William Hayes, which was revived for the Weimar Festival in 2006.

== Works ==
Discography

- Renaissance Duets (L'Oiseau-Lyre, 1972) with James Tyler
- My Lute Awake! (L'Oiseau-Lyre SOL 336, 1974) with James Tyler
- Greensleeves - Lautenmusik der Renaissance (Decca 6.48183 DM, 1981) with James Tyler

Books written

- Performance: Revealing the Orpheus Within (1990)

Books transcribed and edited

- Renaissance Lute Fantasias (1980)
- XII Wonders of the World: 1611 / John Maynard (1985)
- Ayres, c. 1609 / George Handford with Francis Steele (1988)

== See also ==
- James Tyler (musician)
- Julian Bream
