= George Handford (composer) =

English Baroque composer

George Handford (1582–5 – 1647), was an English Baroque composer.

He spent some time in Cambridge, and may have been a pensioner at Emmanuel College, Cambridge in 1604, or a fellow of Trinity College, Cambridge. He married twice, at St.-Dunstan-in-the-West Church, Cambridge.

In 1609, he published Ayres to be sung to thelute, described as "unique in that is the only collection of lute songs that is a carefully prepeared work by one man... and not simply an anthology of somebody's favourite songs"
