= Johann Friedrich Daube =

Johann Friedrich Daube (1730 – 19 September 1797) was a German musician and music theorist.

Daube was born in Hesse, and his early career was as a chamber musician at Stuttgart in the court orchestra of Württemberg. From about 1760 he was councillor and secretary of the Augsburg Academy of Fine Arts and Science; he later lived in Vienna, where he died in 1797.

== Works ==
Daube published the following:

1. Generalbass in drei Akkorden ("Basso continuo in three chords"; published in Leipzig, 1756). "Founded on the rules of the old and new authors, together with a lesson based on this, to get from each key through two middle chords into one of the other 23 keys."
2. Der musikalische Dilettant (Vienna, 1773). "A treatise and composition on the newer and older kinds of fugal settings."
3. Anleitung zum Selbstunterricht in der musikalischen Composition beide für die Instrumental- als Vokalmusik ("Instructions for teaching oneself musical composition, both for instrumental and vocal music"; Vienna, 1798).

One composition by Daube is known to have been published: Sechs Lautensonaten im modernen Geschmack, Op. 1 ("Six lute sonatas in the modern style"), dating from his time in Stuttgart and published in Nuremberg.
