= Johann Paul Schiffelholz =

Johann Paul Schiffelholz (13 March 1685 – 28 January 1758), was a German Baroque composer and an important composer for the variety of baroque lute called "calichon" or "gallichona" (top string in nominal D) or "mandora" (top string in nominal E) - not to be confused with the Italian "colascione" - as well as writing the usual trio sonatas, etc., for the violin family of instruments. He was born in Heideck.

Guitar versions of the mandora music are published by Suvini Zerboni as well as one of the trio sonatas by Breitkopf & Härtel.
