= Gittern =

Medieval necked bowl lute

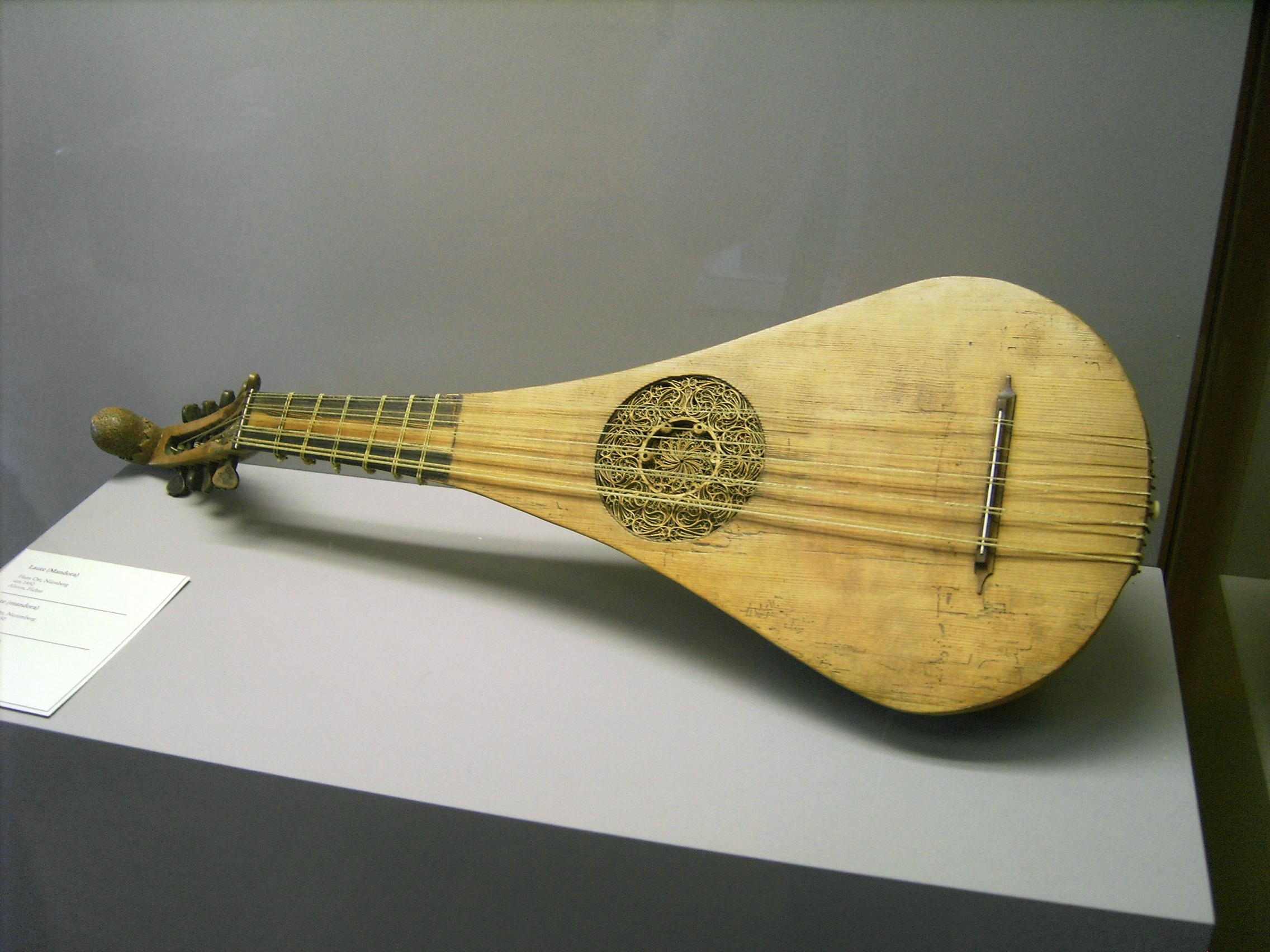
- Five course Gittern or "Quintern" dated 1450, built by luthier Hans Oth
- Classification: String instrument (plucked)
- Hornbostel–Sachs classification: 321.322 (necked box lute) (Chordophone)
- Developed: 13th century

Related instruments
- List: Lute; Mandolin; Mandola; Mandora; Mandore; Oud; Guitar; Setar; Sitar; Theorbo

The gittern was a relatively small gut-strung, round-backed instrument that first appeared in literature and pictorial representation during the 13th century in Western Europe (Iberian Peninsula, Italy, France, England). It is usually depicted played with a quill plectrum, as can be seen clearly beginning in manuscript illuminations from the thirteenth century. It was also called the guiterna in Spain, guiterne or guiterre in France, the chitarra in Italy and Quintern in Germany. A popular instrument with court musicians, minstrels, and amateurs, the gittern is considered an ancestor of the modern guitar and other instruments like the mandore, bandurria and gallichon.

From the early 16th century, a vihuela-shaped (flat-backed) guitarra began to appear in Spain, and later in France, existing alongside the gittern. Although the round-backed instrument appears to have lost ground to the new form which gradually developed into the guitar familiar today, the influence of the earlier style continued. Examples of lutes converted into guitars exist in several museums, while purpose-built instruments like the gallichon utilised the tuning and single string configuration of the modern guitar. A tradition of building round-backed guitars in Germany continued to the 20th century with names like Gittar-Laute and Wandervogellaute.

Up until 2002, there were only two known surviving medieval gitterns, one in the Metropolitan Museum of Art (see external links), the other in the Wartburg Castle Museum. A third was discovered in a medieval outhouse in Elbląg, Poland.

== Structure ==
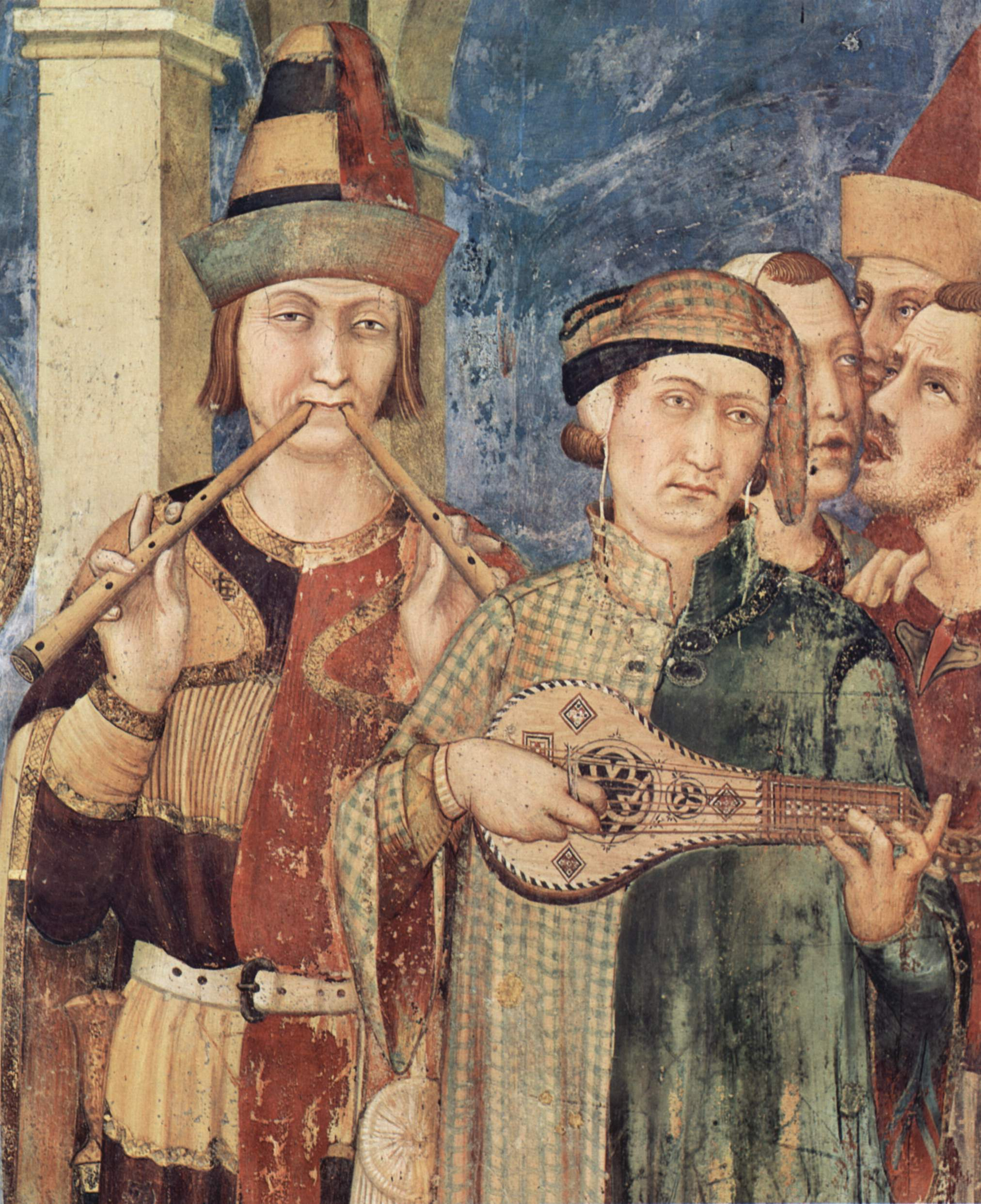
Gittern (right) depicted in a c. 1322 fresco scene from the life of St. Martin of Tours. The instrument on the left is a set of aulos.

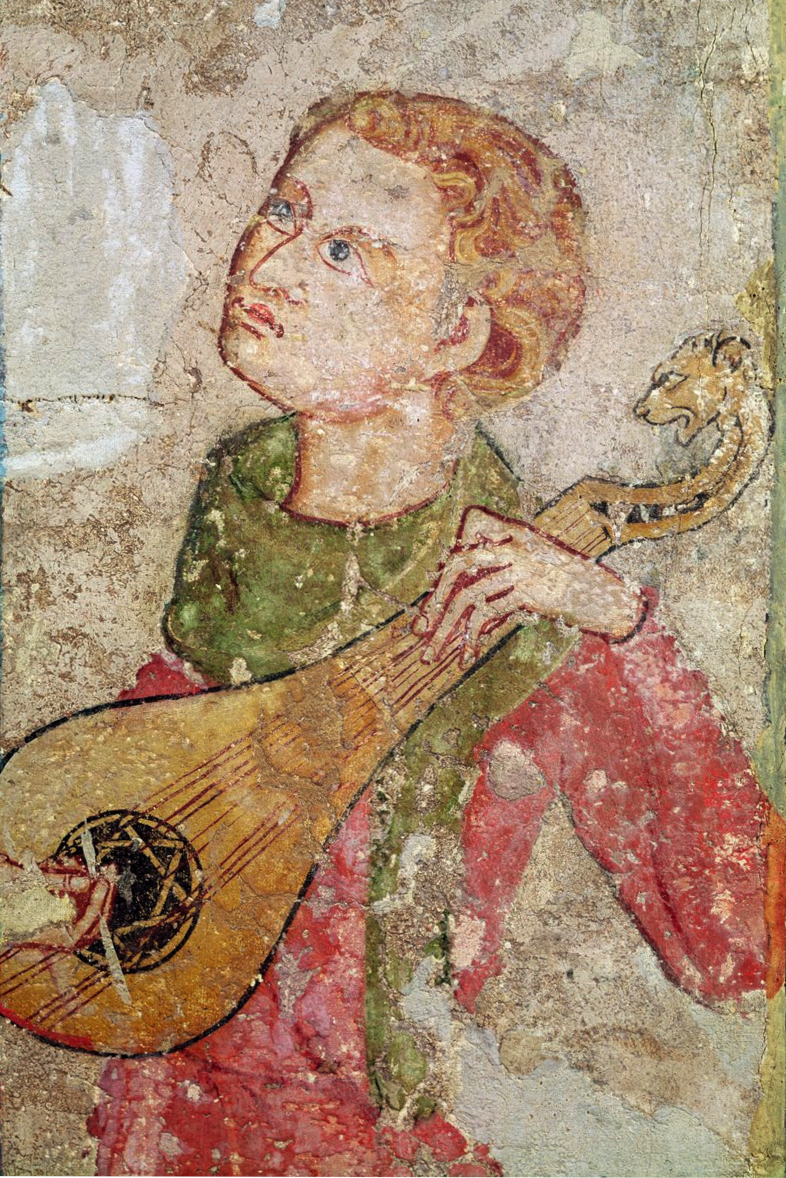
Juan Oliver's c.1330 painting at Pamplona Cathedral, showing a musician playing a gittern.

The back, neck and pegbox were probably usually carved from one piece of timber. Occurring less rarely later in the 15th century, the back was built up from a number of thin tapered ribs joined at the edges, as was characteristic of the lute. Unlike the sharp corner joining the body to the neck seen in the lute, the gittern's body and neck either joined in a smooth curve or straight line. The sickle, or occasional gentle arc pegbox, made an angle with the neck of between 30 and 90 degrees. Unlike the lute, most pegboxes on gitterns ended in a carving of a human or animal head.

Most gitterns were depicted as having three or (more commonly) four courses of double strings. There are also references to some five course gitterns in the 16th century. Although there is not much direct information concerning gittern tuning, the later versions were quite possibly tuned in fourths and fifths like the mandore a few decades later. Frets were represented in a few depictions (mainly Italian and German), although apparently absent in most French, Spanish and English depictions. The gittern's sound hole was covered with a rosette (a delicate wood carving or parchment cutting), similar to the lute.

The construction resembles other bowed and plucked instruments, including the rebec, Calabrian and Byzantine lyra, gǎdulka, lijerica, klasic kemençe, gudok. These have similar shapes, a short neck, and like the gittern are carved out of a single block of wood.

== Relationship between gittern, the citole, lute and guitar family ==
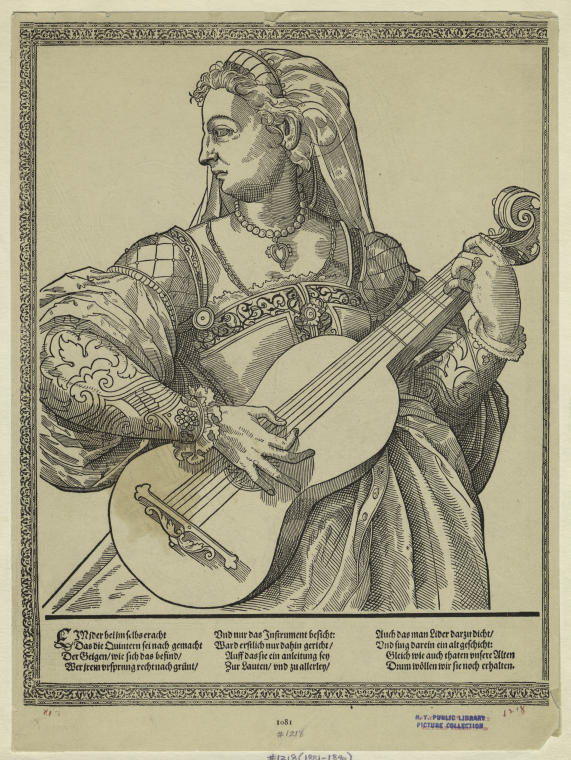
By 1575, the German quintern included guitar-shaped instruments.

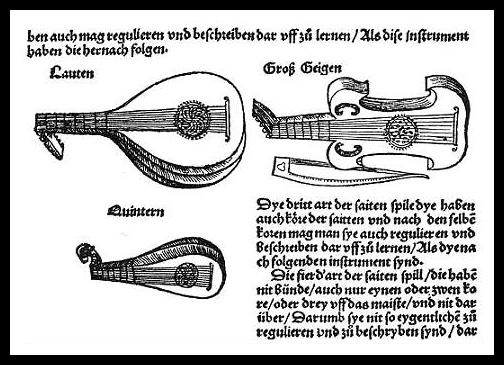
Section from Sebastian Virdung's 1511 book, Musica getuscht und angezogen. (Top left) lute, (right) viol, (bottom) gittern

Some have pointed out that there have been errors in scholarship (starting in the 19th century) which led to the gittern being called mandore and vice versa, and similar confusion with the citole. As a result of this uncertainty, many modern sources refer to gitterns as mandoras, and to citoles as gitterns.

A number of modern sources have also claimed the instrument was introduced to Europe from the Arabic regions in a manner similar to the lute, but actual historical data supporting this theory is rare, ambiguous, and may suggest the opposite. The various regional names used (including the Arabic) appear derived over time from a Greco-Roman (Vulgar Latin) origin, although when and how this occurred is presently unknown. It is possible the instrument existed in Europe during a period earlier than the Arabic conquests in the Iberian peninsula, with the names diverging alongside the regional evolution of European languages from Latin following the collapse of the Roman Empire (compare Romance languages).

While the name of the lute (Portuguese alaúde, Spanish laud, from Arabic al-ʿūd), and the instrument itself has been interpreted as being of Arabic/Persian origin, the gittern does not appear in historical Arabic source material to support what can only be speculation.

== Etymology and identity ==
One of the three "gitterns" may not be
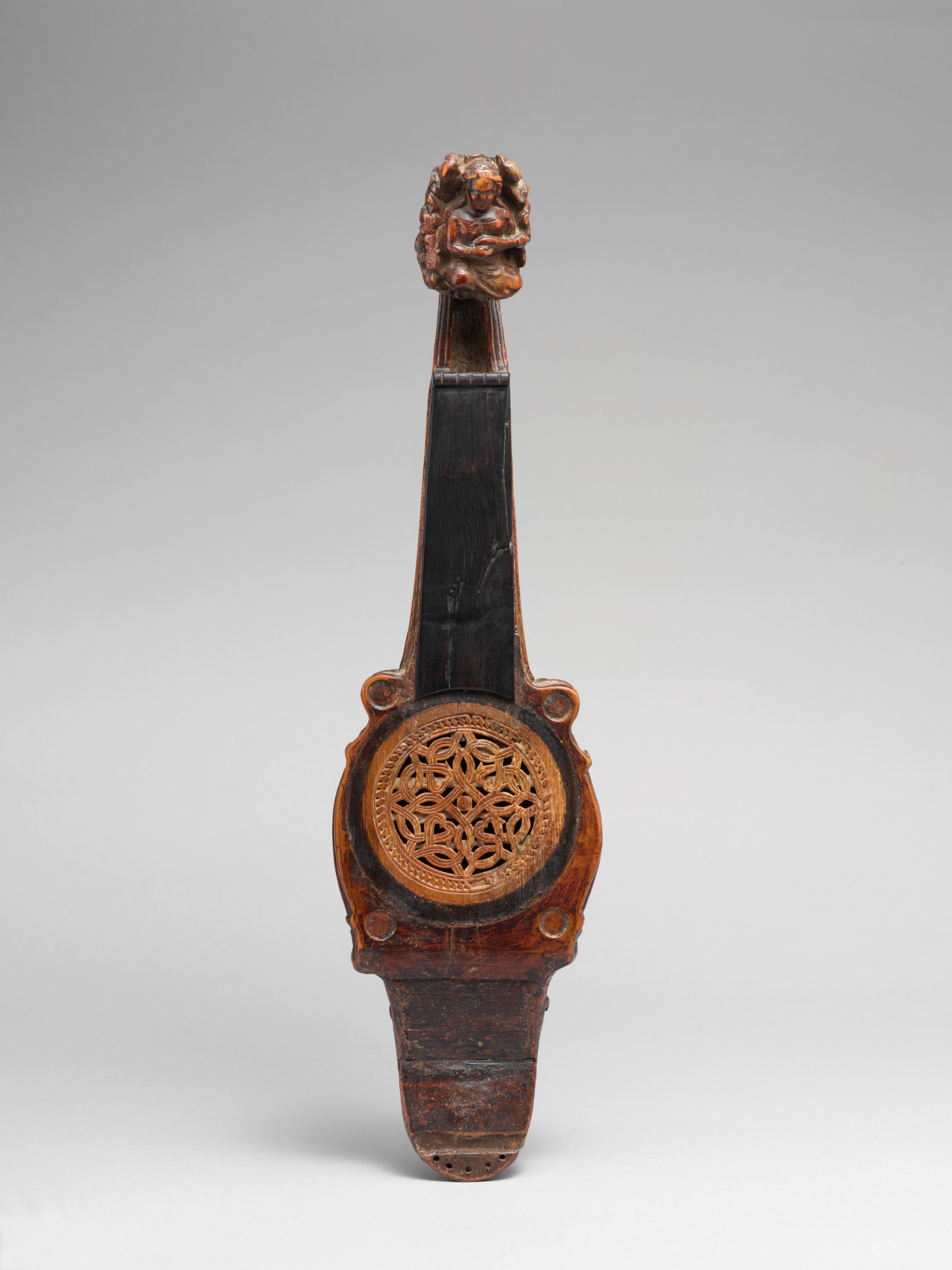
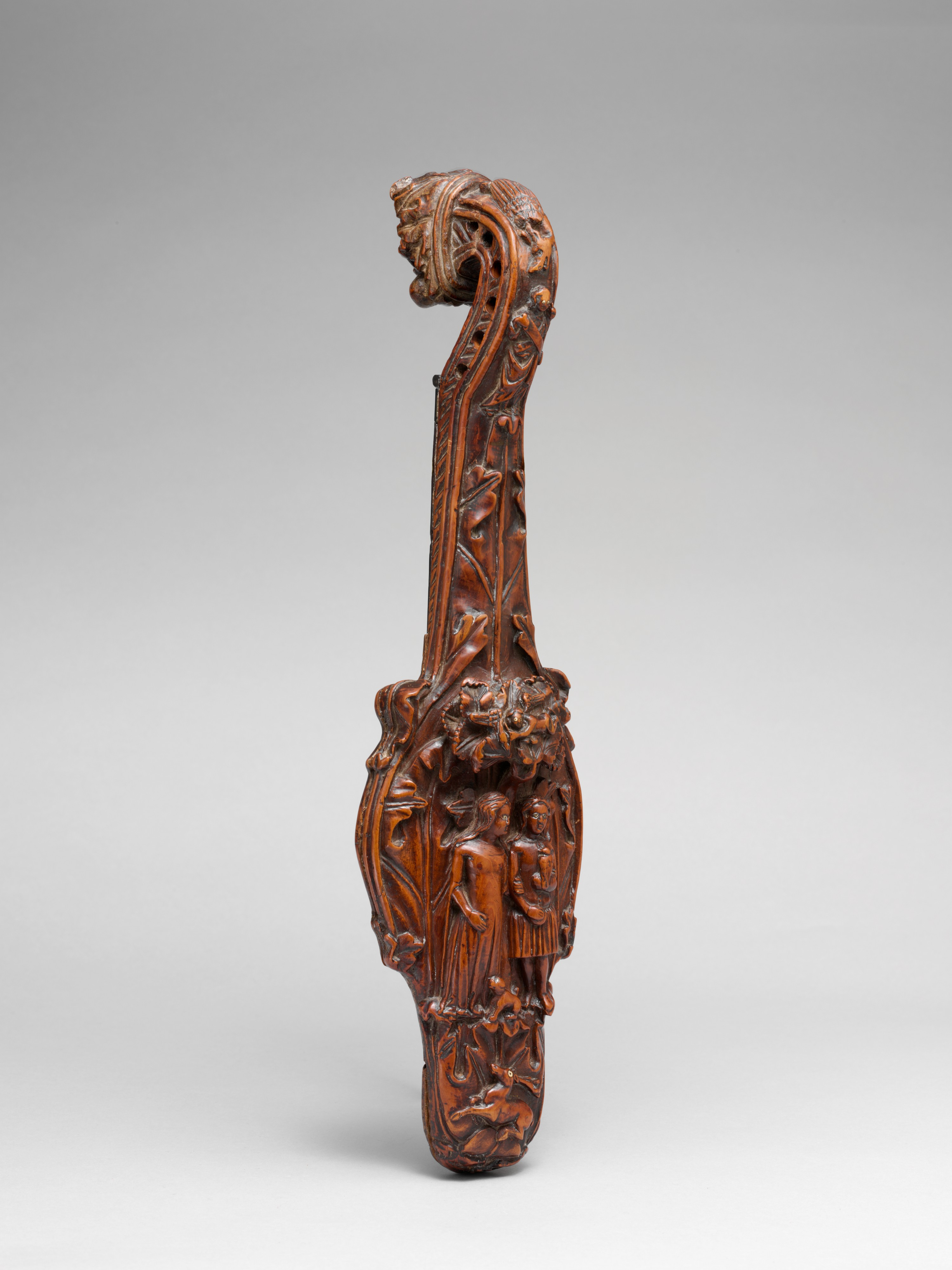
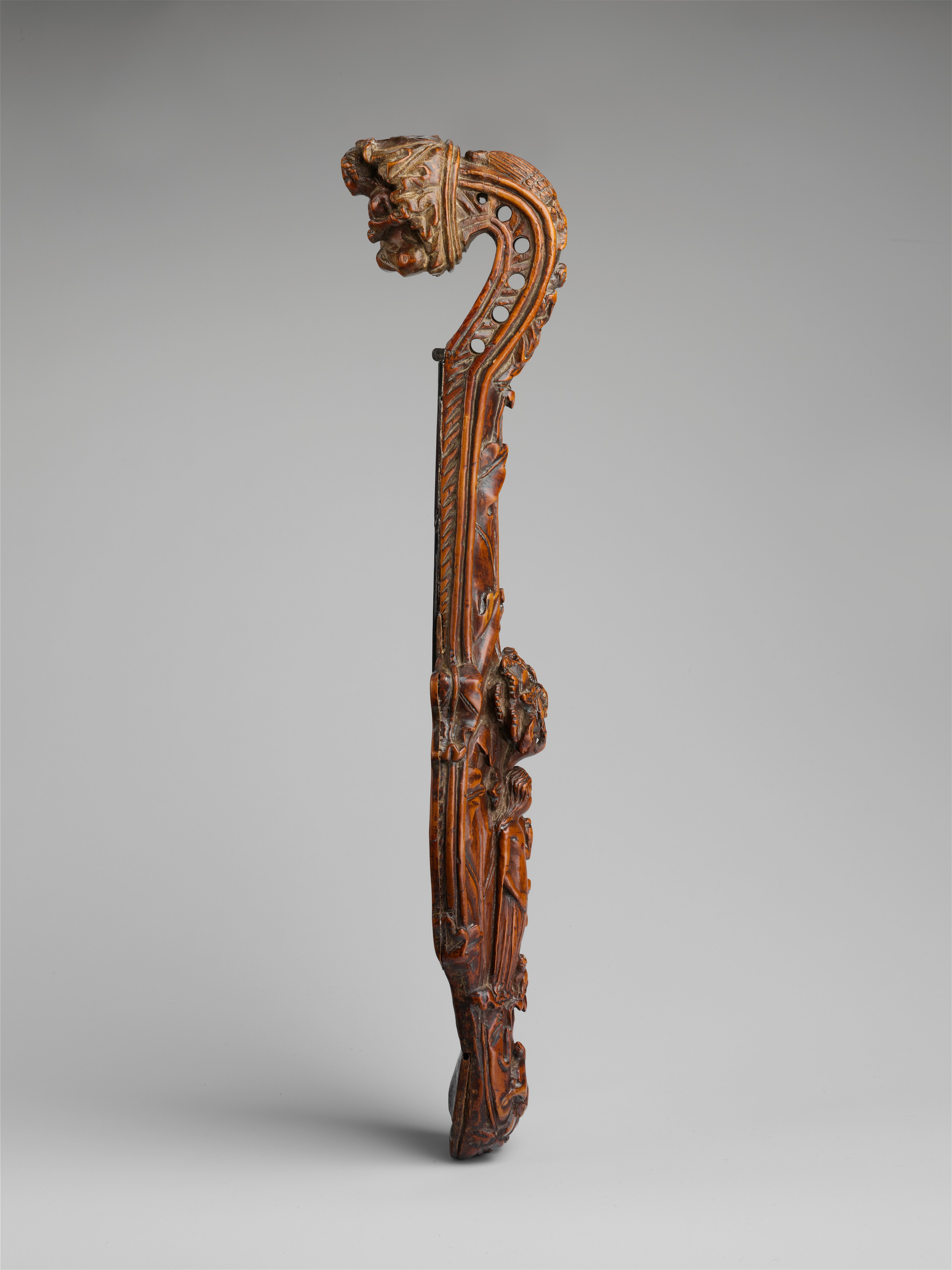
Instrument in the Metropolitan Museum of Arts labeled a gittern in James Tyler's book, The Early Mandolin. The museum catalog, Medieval Art from Private Collections: A Special Exhibition at the Cloisters said that it probably wasn't a gittern but a bowed instrument, possibly a rebec, but one with five strings instead of the rebec's normal three.

The gittern had faded so completely from memory in England that identifying the instrument proved problematic for 20th-century early music scholarship. It was assumed the ancestry of the modern guitar was only to be discovered through the study of flat-backed instruments. As a consequence, what is now believed to be the only known surviving medieval citole was until recently labelled a gittern.

In 1977, Lawrence Wright published his article The Medieval Gittern and Citole: A Case of Mistaken Identity. in issue 30 of the Galpin Society Journal; with detailed references to primary historical source material revealing the gittern as a round-backed instrument - and the so-called 'Warwick Castle gittern' (a flat-backed instrument) as originally a citole.

Wright's research also corresponded with observations about the origins of the flat-backed guitarra made by 16th-century Spanish musicologist Juan Bermudo. With this theoretical approach, it became possible for scholars to untangle previously confusing and contradictory nomenclature. Because of the complex nature of the subject, the list and links below should assist in further reading.

- Names in English: gittern, gittron, giterninge, giterne. John Playford's A Booke of New Lessons for the Cithern & Gittern (published in London in 1652) may represent a response to the continued popularity of both instruments; although references to the gittern virtually disappear in England during the following century. The guitar that re-surfaces during the mid-1750s (referred to as English guitar or 'guittar'), enjoying a wave of popularity that faded away in the 19th century; is an entirely different instrument related to later developments of the cittern. During the 14th century in Geoffrey Chaucer's time, the 'e' that appears at the end of his English spelling 'gyterne' would have been pronounced. But following the great vowel shift - Playford's gittern has lost the 'e' altogether. Although Wright's work enabled identification of the medieval instrument, references to it in 16th century England are more ambivalent regarding structure - leading to the initial confusion identifying the citole. It seems reasonable French and Spanish fashions influenced the gittern during the time of Henry VIII as they did elsewhere.

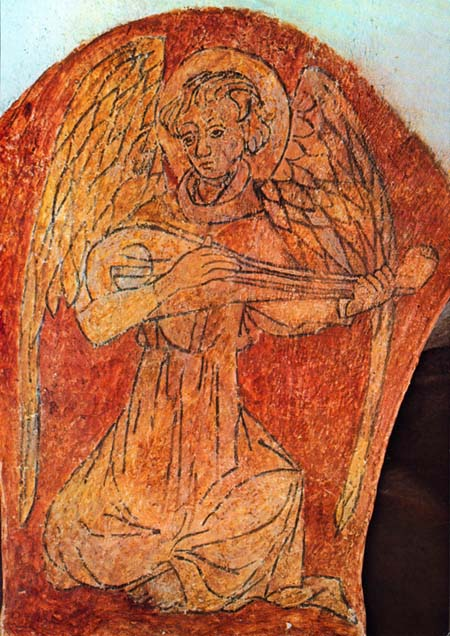
Artwork from the Bayeux Cathedral in France, showing an angel playing a gittern.

- Names in French: gviterre (the 'v' is a Latin substitute for 'u'), guisterne, guitarre, guiterne, guyterne, guiterre, quinterne, quitaire, quitarre (the 'e' at the end of the word may have been stressed in a different and heavier manner to modern pronouncement in a similar manner to the English). In France, the plucked form of the flat-backed 'vielle' (cognate with Spanish 'vihuela'), never assumed the importance it developed in the Iberian and Italian peninsulas. As a consequence the replacement of the round-backed guitarre by the new Spanish style appears disconnected with little to trace in historic sources. The 16th century saw the publications (with illustrations on the front cover depicting the instrument) of works by composers like Guillaume Morlaye and Adrian Le Roy intended for the four course flat-backed guitar, reflecting a new popularity in France possibly more so than Spain.
- Names in Italian: chitarino (It. diminutive, i.e. small chitara), chitarrino, chitarra, cythara. James Tyler has considered the possibility of the chitarino being ancestral to the early mandolin during the 15th century. The chitarrone (literally large 'chitarra'), is an instrument that appeared in the late 1580s and became important for its role in basso continuo supporting various musical ensembles during the 17th century as well as for solo works. The alternative name 'tiorba' (English theorbo) displaced the original word, and is now the preferred term used by modern musicians.
- Names in German: quintern, chiterna, quinterna - possibly derived from the later development of a five course instrument (overlay of Latin quinctus 'five' with chiterna or similar). Juan Bermudo mentioned having seen a 5 course guitarra but that 4 course instruments were normal. The quinterna that appears in the German Michael Praetorius treatise on musical instruments of 1618, Syntagma Musicum (Plate 16) - has pegs inserted sideways in the pegbox but the body is now a flat figure-of-8 shape. Like Bermudo, Praetorius also mentions 5 course instruments but considers 4 courses normal. The surviving instrument by Hans Oth is unusual in comparison to historical depictions, the strings pass over the bridge and are fastened to the lower edge of the body. The strings in historical illustrations are normally shown fastened to the bridge, which may suggest the instrument was converted from four courses at a later date to its construction and the original bridge detached.
- Name in Spanish: guiterna
- Names in Arabic: kouitra, quitra, kaitara. This four course round-backed instrument is usually mentioned in connection with theories supporting an Arabic origin for the gittern. It is constructed in a similar manner to the chitarra Italiana and the oud, although the pegbox has lost all trace of its 'sickle-shaped' predecessor. The modern instrument appears to have survived and developed in Algeria in isolation from surrounding regions, and is traditionally associated with the music of Al-Andalus. This cultural tradition in North Africa is considered closely linked to development in the Iberian peninsula and the later expulsion of the Moriscos between 1609 and 1614.
- Name in Portuguese: The process whereby the round-backed guitarra became a flat-backed instrument in Spain (and the instrument itself) appears to have left little impact on Portuguese history. The usage of 'guitarra' in the 18th century (to present) Portugal refers to a different instrument - the guitarra portuguesa, related to later developments of the cittern.

The modern Portuguese equivalent to the 'Spanish guitar' is still generally known as viola (violão in Brazil - literally large viola), as are some smaller regional related instruments. Portuguese 'viola' (like Italian), is cognate with Spanish 'vihuela'. Unlike in Spain, all these instruments traditionally used metal strings until the advent of modern nylon strings. While the modern violão is now commonly strung with nylon (although steel string variations still exist), in Portugal musicians differentiate between the nylon strung version as guitarra clássica and the traditional instrument as viola de Fado, reflecting the historical relationship with fado music.

While the English and Germans are considered to have borrowed their names from the French, Spanish "guitarra", Italian "chitarra", and the French "guitarre" are believed ultimately to be derived from the Greek "kithara" - although the origins of the historical process which brought this about are not yet understood, with very little actual evidence other than linguistic to explore.

== Role in literature ==
=== Cantigas of Santa Maria ===
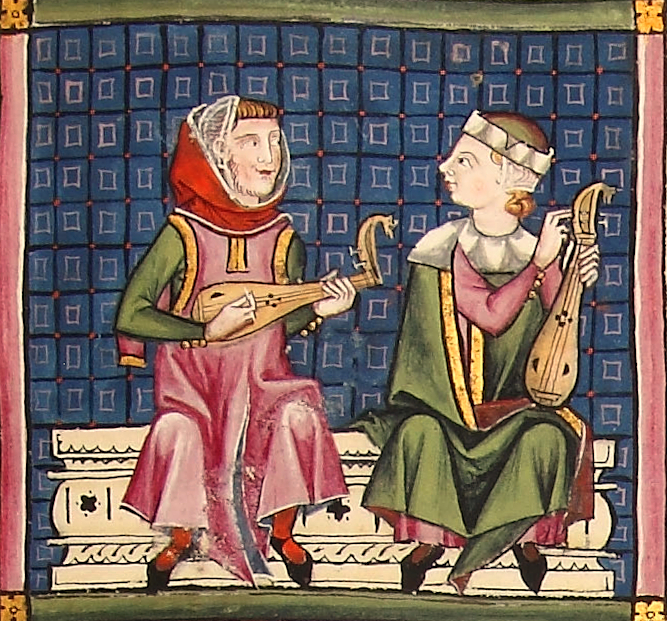
Picture from the Cantigas of Santa Maria showing two musicians with gitterns

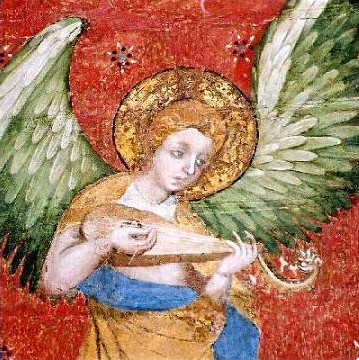
Gittern played by an angel, Cathedral Saint Julien du Mans, France, c. 1325

In Spanish literature, the 13th-century Cantigas de Santa Maria with its detailed colored miniature illustrations depicting musicians playing a wide variety of instruments is often used for modern interpretations - the pictures reproduced and captioned, accompanied by claims supporting various theories and commenting on the instruments.

None of the surviving four manuscripts contain captions (or text in the poems) to support observations other than the gittern appears to have had equal status with other instruments. Although social attitudes towards instruments like the lute, rebec, and gittern may have changed in Spain much later with the cultural impact of the Reconquista - what is recorded in the Cantigas indicates the opposite during this period of history.

Far from being considered an example of Islamic culture, the instrument was used for one occasion to illustrate principles of Christian religious doctrine. French theologian Jean Gerson compared the four cardinal virtues to "la guiterne de quatre cordes" (the gittern of four strings). Italian statesman and poet Dante Alighieri, referring to the qualities (and possibly the structure) of the gittern, said, "...just as it would be a blameworthy operation to make a spade of a fine sword or a goblet of a fine chitarra."

=== Guillaume de Machaut ===
However, 14th-century French composer Guillaume de Machaut in his poem Prise d'Alexandrie: 1150 "Lutes, moraches and guiterne / were played in taverns", notes a secular role away from religious references or royal and ducal courts.

=== Geoffrey Chaucer ===
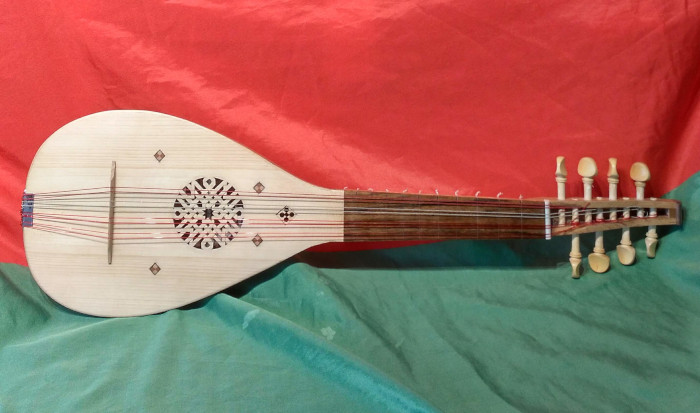
A reconstruction of a medieval gittern

Chaucer also mentions the gittern in the Canterbury Tales (late 14th century) being played by people who frequent taverns. In The Miller's Tale, Absalom serenades a woman outside her window:

Now was ther of that chirche a parish clerk,
the which that was ycleped (called) Absalon...
and as wel coud he play on a giterne.
In all the town n'as (there never was) brewhous ne (nor) taverne,
that he ne visited with his solas [solos].

And his The Cooks Tale., Al konne he pleye on gyterne or ribible (all can he play on gittern or rebab).

=== Other written records ===
Praetorius, commenting on a dual-purpose social role, "..in Italy, the Ziarlatini and Salt' in banco use them for simple strummed accompaniments to their villanelle and other vulgar, clownish songs. (These people are something like our comedians and buffoons.) However, to use the (chiterna) for the beautiful art-song of a good professional singer is a different thing altogether."

The gittern often appeared during the 14th to early 15th century in the inventories of several courts. Charles V of France's court recorded four, including one of ivory, while the Italian courts of Este and Ferrara recorded the hiring of gittern (chitarra) masters.

== Resources ==
Early Music Muse - Gittern

Early Music Instrument Database - Gittern
