= The Consort of Musicke =

The Consort of Musicke is a British early-music group, founded in 1969 by lutenist Anthony Rooley, the ensemble's Artistic Director. The Consort of Musicke is mainly known for vocal music and members of the group have included such well-known singers as sopranos Emma Kirkby and Evelyn Tubb, alto Mary Nichols, tenors Paul Agnew, Andrew King and Joseph Cornwell, and bass Simon Grant. However, it has released albums of purely instrumental music, such as works for viol consort.

The Consort has gone through several major phases in its long life, reflecting the range of passions of Anthony Rooley. The line-up of performers has likewise changed over the years, and expands to encompass particular projects. Core singers since 2004; Evelyn Tubb soprano, Lucy Ballard alto, Andrew King tenor, Simon Grant bass.

The group has made more than 120 recordings that reflect the exploration of music of earlier times, though many of the earlier recordings only exist on vinyl. The Consort’s recent CD recordings include the pre-Raphaelite madrigals of Robert Lucas Pearsall, and the motets of the Dutch composer Verrijt, which received enthusiastic responses from the Dutch critics.

Current repertoire includes a theatrical programme of mad songs; an exploration of English Biblical Narratives of the 17th Century; and a programme which weaves the music of John Dowland with that of his contemporaries, reflecting the close-knit musical community of his day.

== Discography ==
The Consort's earliest recordings on LP for Decca Classics' L'Oiseau Lyre early-music label were for many years unobtainable, although some major recordings, such as the first and only complete recording of Le Chansonnier Cordiforme, were reissued in Japan. Several of these LPs were released by Australian Eloquence on CD for the first time during 2009 and 2010. Other recordings were released in the 12 disc box Dowland - The Collected Works (2007). Consort discs made up 18 of the 50 discs in The Medieval & Renaissance box set released in 2016 by Universal Music's Decca label.

Vocal members included Mary Nichols, whose voice was described as the firmest in the business by Anthony Rooley. At least one of her recordings is in the Library of Congress in Washington.
