= Lute guitar =

Stringed musical instrument

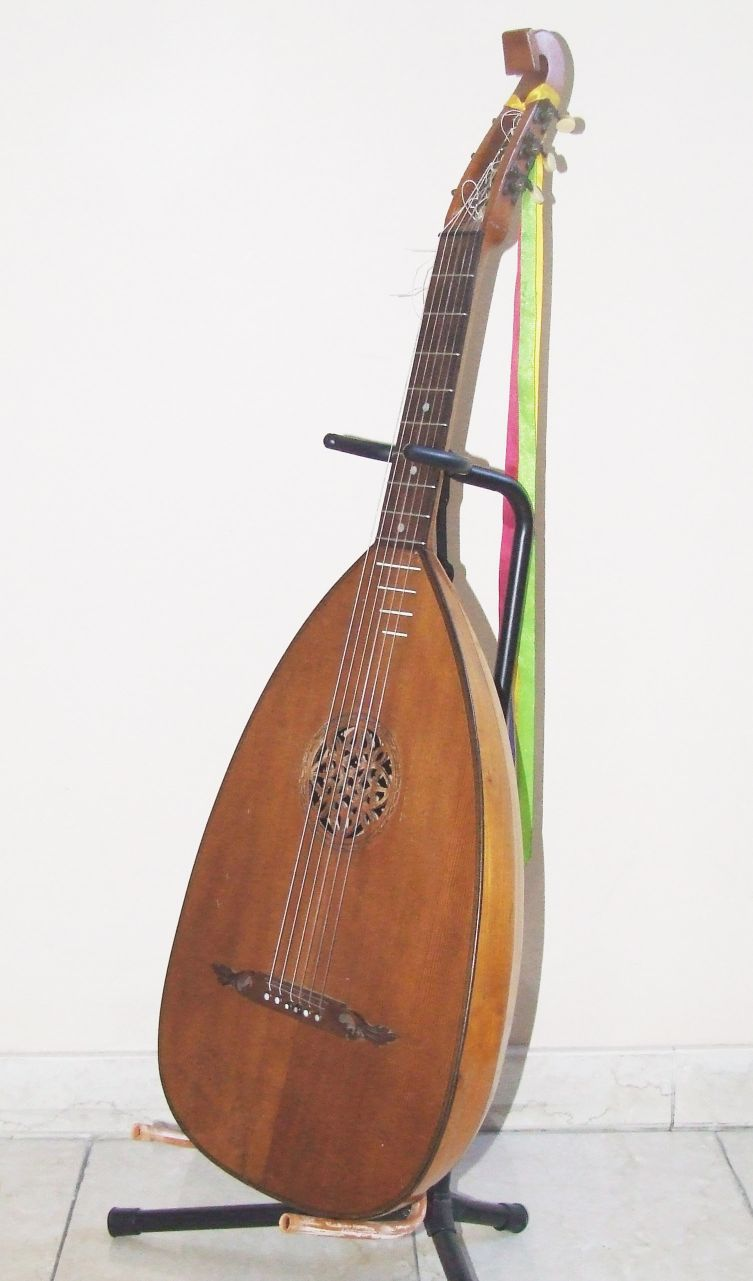
Lute guitar

A lute guitar or German lute (German: Gitarrenlaute, Deutsche Laute or Wandervogellaute, less commonly a lutar (modern Turkish), gui-lute or gittar) is a stringed musical instrument, common in Germany from around 1850. The instrument has a regular six-stringed guitar setup on a lute bowl, however there are many theorboed variants with up to 11 strings. (see de:Deutsche Basslaute)

The instrument is associated with the Wandervogel countercultural movement in Germany in the first half of the 20th century.

The name German lute is sometimes also used for the waldzither, for both gaining the status of a national instrument in the early 20th century.

== Design ==
=== Headstock ===
The headstock commonly ends in two styles, either a head (representing animals or humanoids) or a curve (into a flat finial, carved or undecorated). Less commonly, instead of gears, wooden pegs may be used to tune the strings. Lute guitar headstocks are thinner and more curved than their modern guitar counterparts.

=== Neck and fretboard ===
While the neck of a lute guitar is very similar to that of a modern classical guitar, the fretboard (or fingerboard) design is often different. The fretboard of a modern guitar extends down over the soundboard all the way to the sound hole. However, the lute guitar's fretboard may be on the same level as the soundboard and stop at the bottom of the neck, with the additional frets continuing down the soundboard independently, similar to the lute's. The fretboard is occasionally scalloped.

=== Body ===
The body of the lute guitar is similar to the rounded body of the traditional lute. Several ribs (or panels) of curved wood (usually maple or rosewood) make up the back of body, glued to a wooden frame underneath. These ribs are sometimes painted to resemble the traditional (or stereotypical) perception of a medieval minstrel or jester. For example, ribs may be painted in alternating colors (e.g. white, green, white and so on).

=== Soundboard ===
The lute guitar usually has a bookmatched spruce soundboard with a sound hole, which looks like that of the lute but is much thicker.

=== Sound hole and rosette ===
A modern classical guitar usually has a simply cut sound hole. Lute guitars, however, may have intricate designs carved into the soundboard, such as geometric patterns or representational decorations such as flowers, castles, and scrolls. Alternatively, a simple hole may be cut and a pre-carved disk of wood then glued onto the inside of the soundboard; in some cases, multiple layers of disks are designed in a cascading effect.

=== Bridge ===
The bridge of a lute guitar works in the same manner as a modern guitar bridge, but also serves as a decorative piece made in various shapes, sizes, and styles, often elaborately carved, for example, ending in swirls on each side.
