= List of composers by name =

This is a list of composers by name, alphabetically sorted by surname, then by other names. The list of composers is by no means complete. It is not limited by classifications such as genre or time period; however, it includes only music composers of significant fame, notability or importance who also have current Wikipedia articles. For lists of music composers by other classifications, see lists of composers.

This list is not for arrangers or lyricists (see list of music arrangers and lyricists), unless they are also composers. Likewise, songwriters are listed separately, for example in a list of singer-songwriters and list of Songwriters Hall of Fame inductees.

== A ==
- Michel van der Aa (born 1970)
- Thorvald Aagaard (1877–1937)
- Torstein Aagaard-Nilsen (born 1964)
- Truid Aagesen (fl. 1593–1625)
- Heikki Aaltoila (1905–1992)
- Juhan Aavik (1884–1982)
- Evaristo Felice Dall'Abaco (1675–1742)
- Joseph Abaco (dall'Abaco) (1710–1805)
- Antonio Maria Abbatini (c. 1595 – 1680)
- Gamal Abdel-Rahim (1924–1988)
- Mohamed Abdelwahab Abdelfattah (born 1962)
- Behzad Abdi (born 1973)
- Keiko Abe (born 1937)
- Mary Anne à Beckett (1817–1863)
- Rosalina Abejo (1922–1991)
- Carl Friedrich Abel (1723–1787)
- Clamor Heinrich Abel (1634–1696)
- Ludwig Abel (1835–1895)
- Mark Abel (born 1948)
- Michael Abels (born 1962)
- Peter Abelard (1079–1142)
- Nicanor Abelardo (1893–1934)
- David Abell (died c.1576)
- John Abell (1653 – after 1724)
- Walter Abendroth (1896–1973)
- Jan Håkan Åberg (1916–2012)
- Lasse Åberg (born 1940)
- Johann Joseph Abert (1832–1915)
- 4th Earl of Abingdon (Willoughby Bertie) (1740–1799)
- Peter Ablinger (1959–2025)
- Lora Aborn (1907–2005)
- Girolamo Abos (1715–1760)
- Paul Abraham (1892–1960)
- Maurice Abrahams (1883–1931)
- Mahdyar Aghajani (born 1989)
- Hans Abrahamsen (born 1952)
- Harriett Abrams (1758–1821)
- Alexander Abramsky (1898–1985)
- Kornél Ábrányi (1822–1903)
- Zequinha de Abreu (1880–1935)
- Ayoob Tarish Absi (born 1942)
- Jean Absil (1893–1974)
- Franz Abt (1819–1885)
- Henry Abyngdon (c. 1418 – 1497)
- Filippo Acciaiuoli (1637–1700)
- Jean-Baptiste Accolay (1833–1900)
- Joseph Achron (1886–1943)
- Dieter Acker (1940–2006)
- Marcial del Adalid (1826–1881)
- Adolphe Adam (1803–1856)
- Mark Adamo (born 1962)
- Alton Augustus Adams, Sr. (1889–1987)
- H. Leslie Adams (1932–2024)
- John Adams (born 1947)
- John Luther Adams (born 1953)
- Stephen Adams (Michael Maybrick) (1841–1913)
- Thomas Adams (1785–1858)
- Ella Adayevskaya (Elisabeth Schultz-Adaïewsky) (1846–1926)
- Richard Addinsell (1904–1977)
- John Addison (c. 1765 – 1844)
- John Addison (1920–1998)
- Thomas Adès (born 1971)
- Vasif Adigezalov (1935–2006)
- Hugo Adler (1894–1955)
- Lawrence Cecil Adler (1914–2001)
- Samuel Adler (born 1928)
- Anton Cajetan Adlgasser (1729–1777)
- Bruce Adolphe (born 1955)
- Olle Adolphson (1934–2004)
- Theodor W. Adorno (1903–1969)
- Emmanuel Adriaenssen (c. 1554 – 1604)
- John Adson (c. 1587 – 1640)
- Josina van Aerssen (1733–1797)
- Nikolay Afanas'yev (1820–1898)
- Zeca Afonso (1929–1987)
- Agostino Agazzari (1578–1640)
- Klaus Ager (born 1946)
- Milton Ager (1893–1979)
- François d'Agincourt (1684–1758)
- Maria Teresa Agnesi (1720–1795)
- Lejla Agolli (born 1950)
- Lodovico Agostini (1534–1590)
- Paolo Agostino (c. 1583 – 1629)
- Johan Agrell (1701–1765)
- Alexander Agricola (c. 1446 – 1506)
- Johann Friedrich Agricola (1720–1774)
- Martin Agricola (1486–1556)
- Dionisio Aguado (1784–1849)
- Graciela Agudelo (1945–2018)
- Ernani Aguiar (born 1950)
- Miguel del Águila (born 1957)
- Sebastian Aguilera de Heredia (1561–1627)
- Eden Ahbez (1908–1995)
- Johann Georg Ahle (1651–1706)
- Johann Rudolph Ahle (1625–1673)
- Countess Maria Theresia Ahlefeldt (1755–1810)
- Jacob Niclas Ahlström (1805–1857)
- Ahn Eak-tai (1906–1965)
- Oscar Ahnfelt (1813–1882)
- Kalevi Aho (born 1949)
- Sieglinde Ahrens (born 1936)
- Gregor Aichinger (c. 1565 – 1628)
- Bartholomäus Aich (17th century)
- Karl Stefan Aichelburg (1782–1817)
- John Akar (1927–1975)
- Doris Akers (1923–1995)
- Toshiko Akiyoshi (born 1929)
- Necil Kazım Akses (1908–1999)
- Yasushi Akutagawa (1925–1989)
- Jehan Alain (1911–1940)
- Alamanda de Castelnau (fl. second half of 12th century)
- Pierre Alamire (Peter van den Hove) (c. 1470 – 1536)
- Johannes Alanus (fl. late 14th or early 15th century)
- Jean-Delphin Alard (1815–1888)
- Isaac Albéniz (1860–1909)
- Mateo Pérez de Albéniz (1755–1831)
- Pedro Albéniz y Basanta (1795–1855)
- Pedro Alberch Vila (1517–1582)
- Petur Alberg (1885–1940)
- Eleanor Alberga (born 1949)
- Pirro Albergati (1663–1735)
- Eugen d'Albert (1864–1932)
- Heinrich Albert (1604–1651)
- Stephen Albert (1941–1992)
- Thomas Albert (born 1948)
- Domenico Alberti (c. 1710 – 1740)
- Gasparo Alberti (c. 1489 – c. 1560)
- Giuseppe Matteo Alberti (1685–1751)
- Innocentio Alberti (c. 1535 – 1615)
- Johann Friedrich Alberti (1642–1710)
- Ignazio Albertini (1644–1685)
- Joachim Albertini (1748–1812)
- Henrico Albicastro (von Weissenburg) (c.1660 – after 1730)
- Tomaso Albinoni (1671–1751)
- Charles Albrecht (1817–1895)
- Johann Georg Albrechtsberger (1736–1809)
- William Albright (1944–1998)
- Mark Alburger (1957–2023)
- Nilo Alcala (born 1978)
- Macedonio Alcalá (1831–1869)
- Luna Alcalay (1928–2012)
- José Bernardo Alcedo (1788–1878)
- Michael Alcorn (born 1962)
- Amancio Jacinto Alcorta (1805–1862)
- Casimiro Alcorta (1840–1913)
- Henry Aldrich (1647–1710)
- Amanda Ira Aldridge (1866–1956)
- Robert Aldridge (born 1954)
- Giuseppe Aldrovandini (1671–1707)
- Vittoria Aleotti (c.1575 – after 1620)
- Leni Alexander (1924–2005)
- Liana Alexandra (1947–2011)
- Franco Alfano (1875–1954)
- Alfonso X of Castile (1221–1284)
- Kenneth J. Alford (1881–1945)
- Hugo Alfvén (1872–1960)
- Charlotte Alington Barnard (1830–1869)
- Francesc Alió (1862–1908)
- Franghiz Ali-Zadeh (born 1947)
- Charles-Valentin Alkan (1813–1888)
- Siegfried Alkan (1858–1941)
- Esther Allan (1914–1985)
- Gregorio Allegri (1582–1652)
- Steve Allen (1921–2000)
- Pedro Humberto Allende (1885–1959)
- Juan Allende-Blin (born 1928)
- Kristi Allik (born 1952)
- Richard Allison (1560/1570?–1610?)
- Frances Allitsen (1848–1912)
- Francisco António de Almeida (c. 1702 – 1755)
- João Pedro de Almeida Mota (1744–1817)
- Laurindo Almeida (1917–1995)
- Atso Almila (born 1953)
- Carl Jonas Love Almqvist (1793–1866)
- Eyvind Alnæs (1872–1932)
- Daniel Alomía Robles (1871–1942)
- Francisco Alonso (1887–1948)
- Eduardo Alonso-Crespo (born 1956)
- Yardena Alotin (1930–1994)
- Birgitte Alsted (born 1942)
- Johann Ernst Altenburg (1734–1801)
- Michael Altenburg (1584–1640)
- Martha Alter (1904–1976)
- Johann Christoph Altnickol (1720–1759)
- Fermín María Álvarez (1833–1898)
- Javier Álvarez (1956–2023)
- Antonio Álvarez Alonso (1867–1903)
- Miguel Álvarez-Fernández (born 1979)
- Elias Parish Alvars (1808–1849)
- Maria de Alvear (born 1960)
- Berta Alves de Sousa (1906–1997)
- William Alwyn (1905–1985)
- Alexander Alyabyev (1787–1851)
- Maryanne Amacher (1938–2009)
- Filippo Amadei (c. 1665 – c. 1725)
- Gaetano Amadeo (1824–1893)
- Amalia Catharina, Countess of Erbach (1640–1697)
- Amalie, Princess of Saxony (1794–1870)
- Amaradeva (1927–2016)
- Joan Albert Amargós (born 1950)
- Miguel de Ambiela (1655–1733)
- August Wilhelm Ambros (1816–1876)
- Marco Ambrosini (born 1964)
- Hermann Ambrosius (1897–1983)
- Bjarne Amdahl (1903–1968)
- René Amengual (1911–1954)
- Sahba Aminikia (born 1981)
- Jean-Claude Amiot (born 1939)
- Emanuel Amiran-Pougatchov (1909–1993)
- Charles Amirkhanian (born 1945)
- Elias Nikolaus Ammerbach (c. 1530 – 1597)
- Ammiya (c.1400 BC)
- John Amner (1579–1641)
- Cataldo Amodei (1649–1693)
- David Amram (born 1930)
- Gilbert Amy (born 1936)
- Juan de Anchieta (1462–1523)
- Solange Ancona (1943–2019)
- Jean Ancot (1776–1848)
- Laura Andel (born 1968)
- Gwyneth Van Anden Walker (born 1947)
- Avril Anderson (born 1953)
- Beth Anderson (born 1950)
- Johann Andreas Amon (1763–1825)
- Fritz Andersen (1829–1910)
- Joachim Andersen (1847–1909)
- Julian Anderson (born 1967)
- Laurie Anderson (born 1947)
- Leroy Anderson (1908–1975)
- T. J. Anderson (born 1928)
- Tom Anderson (1910–1991)
- Rafael Andia (born 1942)
- Ruth Anderson (1928–2019)
- Johann André (1741–1799)
- Elfrida Andrée (1841–1929)
- Kerry Andrew (born 1978)
- Annamacharya (1408–1503)
- Johann Anton André (1775–1842)
- Andrea da Firenze (died 1415)
- Saint Andrew of Crete (c. 650–712, 726 or 740)
- Iosif Andriasov (1933–2000)
- Hendrik Andriessen (1892–1981)
- Jurriaan Andriessen (1925–1996)
- Louis Andriessen (1939–2021)
- Willem Andriessen (1887–1964)
- F. Andrieu (fl. late 14th century)
- José Escolástico Andrino (1817–1862)
- Felice Anerio (1560–1614)
- Giovanni Francesco Anerio (c. 1567 – 1630)
- Pasquale Anfossi (1727–1797)
- Gasparo Angiolini (1731–1803)
- Jean-Henri d'Anglebert (1629–1691)
- Giovanni Animuccia (c. 1520 – 1571)
- Anna Amalia (Princess of Prussia) (1723–1787)
- Anna Amalia (Duchess of Saxe-Weimar-Eisenach) (1739–1807)
- Lucia Contini Anselmi (1876 – after 1913)
- Caroline Ansink (born 1959)
- Conrad Ansorge (1862–1930)
- Elizabeth Anspach (1750–1828)
- John Antes (1740–1811)
- George Antheil (1900–1959)
- Andrea Antico (c.1480 – after 1538)
- John Antill (1904–1986)
- Antonello da Caserta (late 14th – early 15th century)
- Antonio da Cividale (fl. 1392–1421)
- Antonio José Martínez Palacios (1902–1936)
- Theodore Antoniou (1935–2018)
- Giovanni D'Anzi (1906–1974)
- Yoshino Aoki (born 1971)
- Georges Aperghis (born 1945)
- Aphex Twin (born 1971)
- Denis ApIvor (1916–2004)
- Giuseppe Apolloni (1822–1889)
- Hans Erich Apostel (1901–1972)
- Dina Appeldoorn (1884–1938)
- Benedictus Appenzeller (1480/1488–after 1558)
- Adelaide Orsola Appignani (1807–1884)
- Louis Applebaum (1918–2000)
- Mark Applebaum (born 1967)
- Thomas Appleby (c.1488?–1563/1564)
- Mary Jeanne van Appledorn (1927–2014)
- Garbis Aprikian (1926–2024)
- Francesco Araja (1709 – after 1762)
- Jesús Arámbarri (1902–1960)
- Pedro Aranaz (1742–1821)
- Juan Arañés (died 1649)
- Juan de Araujo (1646–1712)
- Izabella Arazova (born 1936)
- Jean-Baptiste Arban (1825–1889)
- Chaya Arbel (1921–2007)
- Jacques Arcadelt (1507?–1568)
- Julián Arcas (1832–1882)
- Frederic Archer (1838–1901)
- Malcolm Archer (born 1952)
- Violet Archer (1913–2000)
- José Ardévol (1911–1981)
- Luigi Arditi (1822–1903)
- Sven Arefeldt (1908–1956)
- Bülent Arel (1919–1990)
- Anton Arensky (1861–1906)
- Paolo Aretino (1508–1584)
- Isabel Aretz (1913–2005)
- Dominick Argento (1927–2019)
- Anneli Arho (born 1951)
- Nick Ariondo (born 1949)
- Attilio Ariosti (1666–1729)
- Rodolfo Arizaga (1926–1985)
- Cecilia Arizti (1856–1930)
- Marian Arkwright (1863–1922)
- Albert Arlen (1905–1993)
- Harold Arlen (1905–1986)
- Walter Arlen (1920–2023)
- Jacques Armand (Olof Thiel) (1892–1978)
- Pietro Armanini (1844–1895)
- Elinor Armer (born 1939)
- Andreas Armsdorff (1670–1699)
- Gheorghi Arnaoudov (born 1957)
- Leo Arnaud (1904–1991)
- Desi Arnaz (1917–1986)
- Michael Arne (1740/1741–1786)
- Thomas Arne (1710–1778)
- Richard Arnell (1917–2009)
- Blaž Arnič (1901–1970)
- Carl Arnold (1794–1873)
- Malcolm Arnold (1921–2006)
- Samuel Arnold (1740–1802)
- Yuri Karlovich Arnold (1811–1898)
- Robert Sterling Arnold (1905–2003)
- Juan Crisóstomo Arriaga (1806–1826)
- Emilio Arrieta (1823–1894)
- Claude Arrieu (1903–1990)
- Nikolai Artsybushev (1858–1937)
- Giovanni Artusi (c. 1540 – 1613)
- Vyacheslav Artyomov (born 1940)
- Alexander Arutiunian (1920–2012)
- Elena Asachi (1789–1877)
- Boris Asafyev (1884–1949)
- Christian Heinrich Aschenbrenner (1654–1732)
- Joseph Ascher (1829–1869)
- Leo Ascher (1880–1942)
- Vicente Asencio (1908–1979)
- Thomas Ashwell (c.1478 – after 1513)
- Robert Ashley (1930–2014)
- Nils Henrik Asheim (born 1960)
- Daniel Asia (born 1953)
- Gianmatteo Asola (c. 1532 – 1609)
- Franz Asplmayr (1728–1786)
- Caterina Assandra (c.1590 – after 1618)
- Charles d'Assoucy (1605–1677)
- Ignaz Assmayer (1790–1862)
- Edwin Astley (1922–1998)
- Fèlix Astol i Artés (1813–1901)
- Hugh Aston (Hugh Ashton) (c. 1485 – 1558)
- Peter Aston (1938–2013)
- Emanuele d'Astorga (1680–1757)
- Athenaeus son of Athenaeus (fl. 138 BC–28 BC)
- Esmeralda Athanasiu-Gardeev (1834–1917)
- Chet Atkins (1924–2001)
- Ivor Atkins (1869–1953)
- Pierre Attaingnant (c.1494–late 1551 or 1552)
- Kurt Atterberg (1887–1974)
- Thomas Attwood (1765–1838)
- Daniel Auber (1782–1871)
- Jacques Aubert (1689–1753)
- Louis Aubert (1877–1968)
- Tony Aubin (1907–1981)
- René Aubry (born 1956)
- Edmond Audran (1842–1901)
- Leopold Auer (1845–1930)
- Lera Auerbach (born 1973)
- Marianna Auenbrugger (1759–1782)
- Josepha Barbara Auernhammer (1758–1820)
- May Aufderheide (1888–1972)
- Benedikt Anton Aufschnaiter (1665–1742)
- Rafał Augustyn (born 1951)
- Pietro Auletta (c. 1698 – 1771)
- Tor Aulin (1866–1914)
- Valborg Aulin (1860–1928)
- Georges Auric (1899–1983)
- Dorothea Austin (1921–2011)
- Elizabeth R. Austin (born 1938)
- Ernest Austin (1874–1947)
- Frederic Austin (1872–1952)
- Larry Austin (1930–2018)
- Charles Avison (1709–1770)
- Giuseppe Avitrano (c. 1670 – 1756)
- Pedro António Avondano (1714–1782)
- Ana-Maria Avram (1961–2017)
- Slavko Avsenik (1929–2015)
- Aaron Avshalomov (1894–1965)
- Jacob Avshalomov (1919–2013)
- Daniel Ayala Pérez (1906–1975)
- Héctor Ayala (1914–1990)
- Nat Ayer (1887–1952)
- Richard Ayleward (1626–1669)
- Florence Aylward (1862–1950)
- Frederick Ayres (1876–1926)
- Artemi Ayvazyan (1902–1975)
- Azalais de Porcairagues (fl. mid-12th century)
- Svitlana Azarova (born 1976)
- Filippo Azzaiolo (fl. 1557–1569)

== B ==
- Heidi Baader-Nobs (born 1940)
- Øystein Baadsvik (born 1966)
- Kees van Baaren (1906–1970)
- Arno Babajanian (1921–1983)
- Milton Babbitt (1916–2011)
- William Babell (1689/1690–1723)
- Stanley Babin (1932–2010)
- Luis Enríquez Bacalov (1933–2017)
- Salvador Bacarisse (1898–1963)
- Grażyna Bacewicz (1909–1969)
- Carl Philipp Emanuel Bach (1714–1788)
- Erik Bach (born 1946)
- Georg Christoph Bach (1642–1697)
- Gottfried Heinrich Bach (1724–1763)
- Heinrich Bach (1615–1692)
- Jan Bach (1937–2020)
- Carlos Berlanga (1959–2002)
- Johann Bernhard Bach (1676–1749)
- Johann Bernhard Bach (the younger) (1700–1743)
- Johann Christian Bach (1735–1782)
- Johann Christoph Bach (1642–1703)
- Johann Christoph Friedrich Bach (1732–1795)
- Johann Ernst Bach (1722–1777)
- Johann Lorenz Bach (1695–1773)
- Johann Ludwig Bach (1677–1731)
- Johann Michael Bach (1648–1694)
- Johann Nicolaus Bach (1669–1753)
- Johann Sebastian Bach (1685–1750)
- Maria Bach (1896–1978)
- Wilhelm Friedemann Bach (1710–1784)
- Wilhelm Friedrich Ernst Bach (1759–1845)
- Burt Bacharach (1928–2023)
- Francis Edward Bache (1833–1858)
- Daniel Bacheler (1572–1619)
- Alfred Bachelet (1864–1944)
- Sven-Erik Bäck (1919–1994)
- Agathe Backer-Grøndahl (1847–1907)
- Fridtjof Backer-Grøndahl (1885–1959)
- Johann Georg Heinrich Backofen (1768 – c. 1830)
- Ernst Bacon (1898–1990)
- Nicolas Bacri (born 1961)
- Rosa Giacinta Badalla (c. 1660 – c. 1710)
- Tekla Bądarzewska-Baranowska (1834–1861)
- Klaus Badelt (born 1967)
- Baden Powell (1937–2000)
- Carlo Agostino Badia (1672–1738)
- Maya Badian (born 1945)
- Henk Badings (1907–1987)
- Heinrich Baermann (1784–1847)
- Vera Baeva (1930–2017)
- Carlos Baguer (Carles Baguer) (1768–1808)
- Junsang Bahk (born 1937)
- Judith Margaret Bailey (1941–2025)
- Pierre Baillot (1771–1842)
- Colette Bailly (1928–1976)
- Simon Bainbridge (1952–2021)
- William Baines (1899–1922)
- Giuseppe Baini (1775–1844)
- Edgar Bainton (1880–1956)
- Tadeusz Baird (1928–1981)
- Edward Bairstow (1874–1946)
- Claude Baker (born 1948)
- David Baker (1931–2016)
- George C. Baker (born 1951)
- Bálint Bakfark (Valentin Bakfark) (1526/1530–1576)
- Ruth Bakke (born 1947)
- Leonardo Balada (born 1933)
- Osvaldas Balakauskas (1937–2026)
- Mily Balakirev (1837–1910)
- Andrei Melitonovich Balanchivadze (1906–1992)
- Meliton Balanchivadze (1862–1937)
- Sergey Balasanian (1902–1982)
- Giovanna Bruna Baldacci (1886 – after 1910)
- Claude Balbastre (1724–1799)
- Pietro Baldassare (c. 1683 – after 1768)
- João José Baldi (1770–1816)
- Michael William Balfe (1808–1870)
- Jean Balissat (1936–2007)
- Eric Ball (1903–1989)
- Hank Ballard (1936–2003)
- Robert Ballard (c. 1575 – 1645)
- Carl Christian Nicolaj Balle (1806–1855)
- Esther Ballou (1915–1973)
- Ernő Balogh (1897–1989)
- Puchi Balseiro (1926–2007)
- Thomas Baltzar (c. 1631 – 1663)
- Adriano Banchieri (1568–1634)
- Gilbert Banester (Banaster) (c. 1430 – 1487)
- Raffaello de Banfield (1922–2008)
- John Banister (c. 1625 – 1679)
- Don Banks (1923–1980)
- Tommy Banks (1936–2018)
- Tony Banks (born 1950)
- Granville Bantock (1868–1946)
- Seymour Barab (1921–2014)
- Krešimir Baranović (1894–1975)
- Barbara of Portugal (1711–1758)
- Bartolomeo Barbarino (c. 1568 – 1617 or later)
- Helmut Barbe (1927–2021)
- Emanuele Barbella (1718–1777)
- Samuel Barber (1910–1981)
- Mansi Barberis (1899–1986)
- Francisco Asenjo Barbieri (1823–1894)
- Jacobus Barbireau (1455–1491)
- Cacilda Borges Barbosa (1914–2010)
- Josef Bardanashvili (born 1948)
- Agustín Bardi (1884–1941)
- Jason Bare (born 1975)
- Woldemar Bargiel (1828–1897)
- Zbigniew Bargielski (born 1937)
- Antonino Barges (fl. 1547–1565)
- Sabine Baring-Gould (1834–1924)
- Alexandre Barjansky (1883–1961)
- Vytautas Barkauskas (1931–2020)
- Warren Barker (1923–2006)
- Elaine Barkin (1932–2023)
- Clarence Barlow (1945–2023)
- Wayne Barlow (1912–1996)
- Charlotte Alington Barnard (1830–1869)
- Joseph Barnby (1838–1896)
- Christian Barnekow (1837–1913)
- Milton Barnes (1931–2001)
- Carol Barnett (born 1949)
- Charles Lloyd Barnhouse (1865–1929)
- Ethel Barns (1874–1948)
- Ernst Gottlieb Baron (1696–1760)
- Leonora Baroni (1611–1670)
- Jean Barraqué (1928–1973)
- Carmen Barradas (1888–1963)
- Elsa Barraine (1910–1999)
- Henry Barraud (1900–1997)
- Richard Barrett (born 1959)
- Gisèle Barreau (born 1948)
- Françoise Barrière (1944–2019)
- Jean Barrière (1707–1747)
- Agustín Barrios (1885–1944)
- Ángel Barrios (1882–1964)
- Bebe Barron (1925–2008)
- José Barros (1915–2007)
- Gerald Barry (born 1952)
- John Barry (1933–2011)
- Francesco Barsanti (1690–1772)
- Richard Barth (1850–1908)
- Cecilia Maria Barthélemon (c. 1769 – 1840)
- François-Hippolyte Barthélemon (1741–1808)
- Maria Barthélemon (1749–1799)
- Riccardo Barthelemy (1869–1937)
- Johan Bartholdy (1853–1904)
- Dave Bartholomew (1918–2019)
- Ben Bartlett (1965–2026)
- Béla Bartók (1881–1945)
- Bartolino da Padova (fl. c. 1365–c. 1405)
- Angelo Michele Bartolotti (c. 1615 – 1696)
- Carin Bartosch Edström (born 1965)
- Count Basie (1904–1984)
- Adriana Basile (c. 1580 – c. 1640)
- Adrien Basin (fl. from 1457; died after 1498)
- Philippe Basiron (c. 1449 – 1491)
- Veniamin Basner (1925–1996)
- Francesco Maria Bassani (c. 1650 – c. 1700)
- Giovanni Battista Bassani (c. 1650 – 1716)
- Orazio Bassani (c. 1570 – 1615)
- Giovanni Bassano (c. 1558 – 1617)
- Leslie Bassett (1923–2016)
- Luigi Bassi (1833–1871)
- John Baston (born c. 1683; fl. 1708–1739)
- Josquin Baston (fl. 1542–1563)
- Stanley Bate (1911–1959)
- Thomas Bateson (c. 1570 – 1630)
- Hubert Bath (1883–1945)
- Dennis Báthory-Kitsz (born 1949)
- Rhené-Baton (1879–1940)
- Adrian Batten (c. 1591 – c. 1637)
- Jonathan Battishill (1738–1801)
- Giorgio Battistelli (born 1953)
- Carola Bauckholt (born 1959)
- Marion Bauer (1882–1955)
- Noel Bauldeweyn (c. 1480 – after 1513)
- Kārlis Baumanis (1835–1905)
- Friedrich Baumfelder (1836–1916)
- Jürg Baur (1918–2010)
- Juan Bautista Plaza (1898–1965)
- Sophie Bawr (1773–1860)
- Arnold Bax (1883–1953)
- Christabel Baxendale (1886 – after 1953)
- François Bayle (born 1932)
- Marie Emmanuelle Bayon Louis (1746–1825)
- François Bazin (1816–1878)
- Nisar Bazmi (1925–2007)
- Cyprian Bazylik (c. 1535 – c. 1600)
- Antonio Bazzini (1818–1897)
- Amy Beach (1867–1944)
- Robert Beadell (1925–1994)
- Sally Beamish (born 1956)
- Robert Beaser (born 1954)
- Janet Beat (born 1937)
- Betty Beath (born 1932)
- Beatritz de Dia (fl. late 12th/early 13th centuries)
- Pierre Beauchamp (1631–1705)
- Balthasar de Beaujoyeux (16th century [died 1587])
- Jean-Jacques Beauvarlet-Charpentier (1734–1794)
- Jack Beaver (1900–1963)
- Gilbert Bécaud (1927–2001)
- Marguerite Béclard d'Harcourt (1884–1964)
- Giuseppe Becce (1877–1973)
- Gustavo Becerra-Schmidt (1925–2010)
- Sidney Bechet (1897–1959)
- Conrad Beck (1901–1989)
- Franz Ignaz Beck (1734–1809)
- Jeremy Beck (born 1960)
- Albert Becker (1834–1899)
- Dietrich Becker (c. 1623 – c. 1679)
- Hugo Becker (1863–1941)
- Jean Becker (1833–1884)
- John J. Becker (1886–1961)
- Walter Beckett (1914–1996)
- Max Beckschäfer (born 1952)
- John Beckwith (1927–2022)
- David Bedford (1937–2011)
- Norma Beecroft (1934–2024)
- Joseph Beer (1744–1811)
- Joseph Beer (1908–1987)
- Max Josef Beer (1851–1908)
- Jack Beeson (1921–2010)
- Ludwig van Beethoven (1770–1827)
- Kaspar Anton Karl van Beethoven (1774–1815)
- Sonja Beets (born 1953)
- Eve Beglarian (born 1958)
- Anđelka Bego-Šimunić (1941–2022)
- Franz Behr (1837–1898)
- Jeanne Behrend (1912–1988)
- David Behrman (born 1937)
- Bix Beiderbecke (1903–1931)
- Jeanne Beijerman-Walraven (1878–1969)
- Carl Beines (1869–1950)
- Jean-Pascal Beintus (born 1966)
- Sadao Bekku (1922–2012)
- Luca Belcastro (born 1964)
- Supply Belcher (1751–1836)
- Laurent Belissen (1693–1762)
- William Henry Bell (1873–1946)
- Ján Levoslav Bella (1843–1936)
- Vincenzo Bellavere (c. 1540/1541–1587)
- Giulio Belli (c. 1560 – 1621 or later)
- Paulo Bellinati (born 1950)
- Vincenzo Bellini (1801–1835)
- Paolo Benedetto Bellinzani (1682–1757)
- Carl Michael Bellman (1740–1795)
- Teresa Belloc-Giorgi (1784–1855)
- Herman Bellstedt (1858–1926)
- Herman Bemberg (1859–1931)
- Antonia Bembo (c. 1640 – 1720)
- Ofer Ben-Amots (born 1955)
- Barbara Benary (1946–2019)
- Chiara Benati (born 1956)
- Ralph Benatzky (1884–1957)
- Karl Hermann Heinrich Benda (1748–1836)
- Felix Benda (1708–1768)
- Franz Benda (František) (1709–1786)
- Friedrich Benda (1745–1814)
- Georg Benda (Jiří Antonín) (1722–1795)
- Johann Georg Benda (Jan Jiří) (1713–1752)
- Joseph Benda (Josef) (1724–1804)
- Franz Bendel (1833–1874)
- Victor Bendix (1851–1926)
- Karel Bendl (1838–1897)
- Josefina Benedetti (born 1953)
- Julius Benedict (1814–1856)
- Juraj Beneš (1940–2004)
- Orazio Benevoli (1605–1672)
- Soledad Bengoecha de Cármena (1849–1893)
- Paul Ben-Haim (1897–1984)
- Angelo Maria Benincori (1779–1821)
- Arthur Benjamin (1893–1960)
- George Benjamin (born 1960)
- Thomas Brooke Benjamin (1929–?)
- Tim Benjamin (born 1975)
- John Bennet (c. 1575 – after 1614)
- John Bennett (c. 1735 – 1784)
- Richard Rodney Bennett (1936–2012)
- Robert Russell Bennett (1894–1981)
- William Sterndale Bennett (1816–1875)
- Peter Benoit (1834–1901)
- Jørgen Bentzon (1897–1951)
- Niels Viggo Bentzon (1919–2000)
- Pierre-Jean de Béranger (1780–1857)
- Angelo Berardi (c. 1636 – 1694)
- Frédéric Bérat (1801–1855)
- Cathy Berberian (1925–1983)
- Jacquet de Berchem (c. 1505 – 1567)
- Maxim Berezovsky (c. 1745 – 1777)
- Alban Berg (1885–1935)
- Gunnar Berg (1909–1989)
- Natanael Berg (1879–1957)
- Petar Bergamo (1930–2022)
- Irénée Berge (1867–1926)
- Arthur Berger (1925–2003)
- Jean Berger (1909–2002)
- Jonathan Berger (born 1954)
- Ludwig Berger (1777–1839)
- Theodor Berger (1905–1992)
- Andreas Peter Berggreen (1801–1880)
- Gertrude van den Bergh (1793–1840)
- Anders Berglund (born 1948)
- Erik Bergman (1911–2006)
- William Bergsma (1921–1994)
- Ercole Bernabei (1622–1687)
- Luciano Berio (1925–2003)
- Charles Auguste de Bériot (1802–1870)
- Charles-Wilfrid de Bériot (1833–1914)
- Lennox Berkeley (1903–1989)
- Michael Berkeley (born 1948)
- Christine Berl (born 1943)
- Irving Berlin (1888–1989)
- Johan Daniel Berlin (1714–1787)
- Herman Berlinski (1910–2001)
- Hector Berlioz (1803–1869)
- Bart Berman (born 1938)
- Derek Bermel (born 1967)
- Juan Bermudo (c. 1510 – after 1559)
- Giuseppe Antonio Bernabei (1649–1732)
- Miguel Bernal Jiménez (1910–1956)
- Carmelo Alonso Bernaola (1929–2002)
- Felix Bernard (1897–1944)
- Stefano Bernardi (c. 1577 – 1637)
- Bernart de Ventadorn (born 1130/1140–died 1190/1200)
- Friedrich Wilhelm Berner (1780–1827)
- Lord Berners (Gerald Tyrwhitt) (1883–1950)
- Christoph Bernhard (1628–1692)
- Nicolas Bernier (1664–1734)
- Lauren Bernofsky (born 1967)
- Elmer Bernstein (1922–2004)
- Leonard Bernstein (1918–1990)
- Catalina Berroa (1849–1911)
- Antonio Bertali (1605–1669)
- Heinrich Berté (1858–1924)
- Giovanni Pietro Berti (c. 1590 – 1638)
- Louise Bertin (1805–1877)
- Toussaint Bertin de la Doué (c. 1680 – 1743)
- Henri Bertini (1798–1876)
- Joseph Bertolozzi (born 1959)
- Henri-Montan Berton (1767–1844)
- Pierre Montan Berton (1727–1780)
- Georg von Bertouch (1668–1743)
- Anthoine de Bertrand (c. 1530/40–c. 1581)
- Arturo Berutti (1858–1938)
- Franz Berwald (1796–1868)
- Johan Fredrik Berwald (1787–1861)
- Jean-Baptiste Besard (c. 1567 – c. 1625)
- Alessandro Besozzi (1702–1775)
- Antonio Besozzi (1714–1781)
- Carlo Besozzi (1738–1791)
- Cristoforo Besozzi (1661–1725)
- Francesco Besozzi (1766–1816)
- Gaetano Besozzi (1727–1798)
- Girolamo Besozzi (c. 1745 – 1788)
- Giuseppe Besozzi (1686–1760)
- Henri Besozzi (1775–18??)
- Louis Désiré Besozzi (1814–1879)
- Paolo Girolamo Besozzi (1704–1778)
- William Thomas Best (1826–1897)
- Bruno Bettinelli (1913–2004)
- Oscar Bettison (born 1975)
- William Richard Bexfield (1824–1853)
- Frank Michael Beyer (1928–2008)
- Johanna Beyer (1888–1944)
- William Richard Bexfield (1824–1853)
- Sandeep Bhagwati (born 1963)
- Vishal Bhardwaj (born 1960)
- Oscar Bianchi (born 1975)
- Francesco Bianchi (1752–1810)
- Frederick Bianchi (born 1954)
- Giovanni Bianchi (c. 1660 – after 1720)
- Giovanni Battista Bianchi (flourished 1675)
- Lycia de Biase Bidart (1910–1990)
- Gillian Bibby (1945–2023)
- Carl Heinrich Biber (1681–1749)
- Heinrich Ignaz Franz von Biber (1644–1704)
- Franz Xaver Biebl (1906–2001)
- Michael von Biel (born 1937)
- Auguste van Biene (1849–1913)
- Diogenio Bigaglia (1676–1745)
- Marie Bigot (1786–1820)
- Beatriz Bilbao (born 1951)
- Georg Christoph Biller (1955–2022)
- William Billings (1746–1800)
- Elizabeth Weichsell Billington (c. 1768–1818)
- Alberto Bimboni (1882–1960)
- Gilles Binchois (Gilles de Bins) (c. 1400–1460)
- Abraham Wolfe Binder (1895–1966)
- Ronald Binge (1910–1979)
- Jocelyne Binet (1923–1968)
- Judith Bingham (born 1952)
- Seth Bingham (1882–1972)
- Pasquale Bini (1716–1770)
- Stanislav Binički (1872–1942)
- Antonio Bioni (1698–1739)
- Wenzel Raimund Birck (Pirck) (1718–1763)
- Arthur H. Bird (1856–1923)
- Johann Adam Birkenstock (1687–1733)
- Renate Birnstein (born 1946)
- Harrison Birtwistle (1934–2022)
- Chester Biscardi (born 1948)
- Hermann Bischoff (1868–1936)
- Henry Rowley Bishop (1786–1855)
- Roberta Bitgood (1908–2007)
- Marcel Bitsch (1921–2011)
- Iva Bittová (born 1958)
- Georges Bizet (1838–1875)
- Boris Blacher (1903–1975)
- Stanley Black (1913–2002)
- Richard Blackford (born 1954)
- Easley Blackwood, Jr. (1933–2023)
- Helen Blackwood (1807–1867)
- Leopoldine Blahetka (1809–1885)
- Eubie Blake (1883–1983)
- Adolphe Blanc (1828–1885)
- Blanche of Castile (1188–1252)
- Emile-Robert Blanchet (1877–1943)
- Olga De Blanck Martín (1916–1998)
- Maria Theresa Bland (c. 1769 – 1838)
- Frédéric Blasius (Matthäus Blasius) (1758–1829)
- Michel Blavet (1700–1768)
- Theo Bleckmann (born 1966)
- Herbert Blendinger (1936–2020)
- Carla Bley (1936–2023)
- Arthur Bliss (1891–1975)
- Marc Blitzstein (1905–1964)
- André Bloch (1873–1960)
- Augustyn Bloch (1929–2006)
- Ernest Bloch (1880–1959)
- Vilém Blodek (1834–1874)
- Karl-Birger Blomdahl (1916–1968)
- Patricia Blomfield Holt (1910–2003)
- John Blow (1649–1708)
- Felix Blumenfeld (1863–1931)
- Sonia Bo (born 1960)
- Howard Boatwright (1918–1999)
- Luigi Boccherini (1743–1805)
- Nicolas Bochsa (1789–1856)
- Berta Bock (1857–1945)
- Mlle Bocquet (early 17th century – after 1660)
- Philipp Friedrich Böddecker (1607–1683)
- Erhard Bodenschatz (1576–1636)
- Josina Anna Petronella van Boetzelaer (1733–1787)
- Joseph Bodin de Boismortier (1689–1775)
- Sebastian Bodinus (c. 1700 – 1759)
- Seóirse Bodley (1933–2023)
- Sylvie Bodorová (born 1954)
- Jack Body (1944–2015)
- August de Boeck (1865–1937)
- Konrad Boehmer (1941–2014)
- Jorge Boehringer (born 1975)
- Léon Boëllmann (1862–1897)
- Alexandre Pierre François Boëly (1785–1858)
- Antoine Boësset (1586–1643)
- Jean-Baptiste Boësset (1614–1685)
- Anna Bofill Levi (born 1944)
- Dušan Bogdanović (born 1955)
- Nikita Bogoslovsky (1913–2004)
- Georg Böhm (1661–1733)
- Theobald Böhm (1794–1881)
- Oskar Böhme (1870–1938)
- Emil Bohnke (1888–1928)
- François-Adrien Boieldieu (1775–1834)
- Rob du Bois (1934–2013)
- Arrigo Boito (1842–1918)
- Michèle Bokanowski (born 1943)
- William Bolcom (born 1938)
- Anne Boleyn (1507–1536)
- Claude Bolling (1930–2020)
- Bartolomeo da Bologna (fl. 1405–1427)
- Joseph Bologne, Chevalier de Saint-Georges (1745–1799)
- Andreas Boltz (born 1964)
- Ginés de Boluda (c. 1545 – after 1604)
- João Domingos Bomtempo (1775–1842)
- Anna Bon (di Venezia) (c. 1739 – after 1767)
- Capel Bond (1730–1790)
- Carrie Bond (1862–1946)
- Christopher Bond (born 1992)
- Victoria Bond (born 1945)
- Emmanuel Bondeville (1898–1987)
- Margaret Allison Bonds (1913–1972)
- Luiz Bonfá (1922–2001)
- Andrée Bonhomme (1905–1982)
- Severo Bonini (1582–1663)
- Mélanie Bonis (1858–1937)
- Paul Bonneau (1918–1995)
- Joseph Bonnet (1884–1944)
- Antonio Maria Bononcini (1677–1726)
- Giovanni Bononcini (1670–1747)
- Giovanni Maria Bononcini (1642–1678)
- Francesco Antonio Bonporti (1672–1749)
- Giovanni Andrea Bontempi (c. 1624 – 1705)
- Henriette van den Boorn-Coclet (1866–1945)
- Francis Boott (1813–1904)
- Modesta Bor (1926–1998)
- Melchior Borchgrevinck (c. 1570 – 1632)
- David Borden (born 1938)
- Johanna Bordewijk-Roepman (1892–1971)
- Benjamin Boretz (born 1934)
- Oscar Borg (1851–1930)
- Raúl Borges (1882–1967)
- Borlet (fl. 14th and 15th century)
- François Borne (1840–1920)
- Alexander Borodin (1833–1887)
- Felix Borowski (1872–1956)
- Teresa Borràs i Fornell (1923–2010)
- Hakon Børresen (1876–1954)
- Siegfried Borris (1906–1987)
- Edith Borroff (1925–2019)
- Pietro Paolo Borrono (c. 1490 – after 1563)
- Sergei Bortkiewicz (1877–1952)
- Dmitry Bortniansky (1751–1825)
- Daniel Börtz (born 1943)
- Axel Borup-Jørgensen (1924–2012)
- Maura Bosch (born 1958)
- Cornelis Boscoop (before 1531–1573)
- Henriëtte Bosmans (1895–1952)
- Jean-Yves Bosseur (born 1947)
- Costante Adolfo Bossi (1876–1953)
- Marco Enrico Bossi (1861–1925)
- Franciscus Bossinensis (fl. 1509–1511)
- George Botsford (1874–1949)
- Hans Bottermund (1892–1949)
- Giovanni Bottesini (1821–1889)
- Marianna Bottini (1802–1858)
- Linda Bouchard (born 1957)
- Raimondo Boucheron (1800–1876)
- André Boucourechliev (1925–1997)
- Rutland Boughton (1878–1960)
- Georges Boulanger (1893–1958)
- Lili Boulanger (1883–1918)
- Nadia Boulanger (1887–1979)
- Joséphine Boulay (1869–1925)
- Pierre Boulez (1925–2016)
- Derek Bourgeois (1941–2017)
- Louis Bourgeois (c. 1510/1515 – 1559)
- Roger Bourland (born 1952)
- Jean-Baptiste Drouard de Bousset (1662–1725)
- René Drouard de Bousset (1703–1760)
- Josse Boutmy (1697–1779)
- Roger Boutry (1932–2019)
- François Bouvard (c. 1684 – 1760)
- Guillaume Bouzignac (before 1592 – after 1641)
- Fritz Bovet (fl. 1845–1888)
- Helen Bowater (born 1952)
- York Bowen (1884–1961)
- Michael Bowles (1909–1998)
- Paul Bowles (1910–1999)
- Euday Louis Bowman (1887–1949)
- Christian Ludwig Boxberg (1670–1729)
- William Boyce (1711–1779)
- Anne Boyd (born 1946)
- Brian Boydell (1917–2000)
- Peter Boyer (born 1970)
- Martin Boykan (1931–2021)
- Ina Boyle (1889–1967)
- Simon Boyleau (fl. c. 1544 – after 1586)
- Anne Louise Boyvin d'Hardancourt Brillon de Jouy (1744–1824)
- Jacques Boyvin (1649–1706)
- Eugène Bozza (1905–1991)
- Hans Brachrogge (c. 1590 – c. 1638)
- Jean Braconnier (dit Lourdault) (fl. from 1478; died 1512)
- William Brade (1560–1630)
- Scott Bradley (1891–1977)
- Edvard Fliflet Bræin (1924–1976)
- Antonio Braga (1929–2009)
- Cristina Braga (born 1966)
- Francisco Braga (1868–1945)
- Gaetano Braga (1829–1907)
- Joly Braga Santos (1924–1988)
- José Bragato (1915–2017)
- May Brahe (1884–1956)
- Johannes Brahms (1833–1897)
- Constantin Brăiloiu (1893–1958)
- Thüring Bräm (born 1944)
- Caspar Joseph Brambach (1833–1902)
- Glenn Branca (1948–2018)
- Johann Brandl (1835–1913)
- Johann Evangelist Brandl (1760–1837)
- Eddie Brandt (1920–2011)
- Willy Brandt (1869–1923)
- Jan Brandts Buys (1868–1933)
- Gena Branscombe (1881–1977)
- Henry Brant (1913–2008)
- Johannes Brassart (c. 1400/1405–1455)
- Louis Brassin (1840–1884)
- Yehezkel Braun (1922–2014)
- Walter Braunfels (1882–1954)
- Charlotte Bray (born 1982)
- Johannes Bernardus van Bree (1801–1857)
- Goran Bregović (born 1950)
- Josefina Brdlíková (1843–1910)
- Joseph Carl Breil (1870–1926)
- Peter Breiner (born 1957)
- Jacques Brel (1929–1978)
- Thérèse Brenet (born 1935)
- Bettina Brentano (1785–1859)
- Jan Josef Ignác Brentner (1689–1742)
- Giuseppe Antonio Brescianello (c. 1690 – 1758)
- Cesar Bresgen (1913–1988)
- Martin Bresnick (born 1946)
- Tomás Bretón (1850–1923)
- Jean-Baptiste Bréval (1753–1823)
- Giovanni Battista Brevi (c. 1650 – 1725)
- Pierre de Bréville (1861–1949)
- Thomas Brewer (1611 – c. 1660)
- Havergal Brian (1876–1972)
- Giulio Briccialdi (1818–1881)
- Walter Bricht (1904–1970)
- Frank Bridge (1879–1941)
- Wolfgang Carl Briegel (1626–1712)
- Lou Briel (born 1962)
- David Briggs (1943–2025)
- Roger Briggs (born 1952)
- Dora Bright (1862–1951)
- Anne Louise Brillon de Jouy (1744–1824)
- Antonio Brioschi (fl. c. 1725–1750)
- Michael Brimer (1933–2023)
- George Frederick Bristow (1825–1898)
- Radie Britain (1899–1994)
- Estêvão de Brito (1575–1641)
- Benjamin Britten (1913–1976)
- Frantisek Brixi (1732–1771)
- Šimon Brixi (1693–1735)
- Maria Brizzi Giorgi (1775–1822)
- Brenton Broadstock (born 1952)
- Robert Broberg (1940–2015)
- Howard Brockway (1870–1951)
- Henri Brod (1799–1839)
- Roslyn Brogue (1919–1981)
- Gerhard Bronner (1922–2007)
- Big Bill Broonzy (1903–1958)
- Ingeborg von Bronsart (1840–1913)
- Riccardo Broschi (c. 1698 – 1756)
- Sébastien de Brossard (1655–1730)
- Bruce Broughton (born 1945)
- Leo Brouwer (born 1939)
- Margaret Brouwer (born 1940)
- Earle Brown (1926–2002)
- James Francis Brown (born 1969)
- Nacio Herb Brown (1896–1964)
- Augusta Browne (1820–1882)
- Harriet Browne (1790–1858)
- John Browne (fl. c. 1480–1505)
- Dave Brubeck (1920–2012)
- Rudolf Brucci (1917–2002)
- David Bruce (born 1970)
- Max Bruch (1838–1920)
- Arnold von Bruck (c. 1500 – 1554)
- Gerard von Brucken Fock (1859–1935)
- Anton Bruckner (1824–1896)
- Joan Brudieu (1520–1591)
- Nicolaus Bruhns (1665–1697)
- Theo Bruins (1929–1993)
- Colin Brumby (1933–2018)
- Antoine Brumel (c. 1460 – 1512/1513)
- Albert E. Brumley (1905–1977)
- Fritz Brun (1878–1959)
- Herbert Brün (1918–2000)
- Klaus Bruengel (born 1949)
- Pablo Bruna (1611–1679)
- Arnold Brunckhorst (1670–1725)
- Alfred Bruneau (1857–1934)
- Antonio Brunelli (1577–1630)
- Gaetano Brunetti (1744–1798)
- Karl Gottfried Brunotte (born 1958)
- Victor Bruns (1904–1996)
- Elisabetta Brusa (born 1954)
- Bjarne Brustad (1895–1978)
- Peter Bruun (born 1968)
- Joanna Bruzdowicz (1943–2021)
- Steven Bryant (born 1972)
- Gavin Bryars (born 1943)
- Ernest Bryson (1867–1942)
- Filipina Brzezinska-Szymanowska (1800–1886)
- Mark Bucci (1924–2002)
- Dorothy Quita Buchanan (born 1945)
- Hans Buchner (1483–1538)
- Philipp Friedrich Buchner (1614–1669)
- Dudley Buck (1839–1909)
- Ole Buck (born 1945)
- Boudewijn Buckinx (born 1945)
- John Buckley (born 1951)
- Olivia Buckley (born mid-1790s – after 1845)
- Harold Budd (1936–2020)
- Margaret Buechner (1922–1998)
- Eivind Buene (born 1973)
- Pierre-Gabriel Buffardin (1690–1768)
- John Bull (1562/1563–1628)
- Ole Bull (1810–1880)
- Alan Bullard (born 1947)
- Nini Bulterijs (1929–1989)
- Kenji Bunch (born 1973)
- August Bungert (1845–1915)
- Benedictus Buns (1642–1716)
- Giovanni Battista Buonamente (c. 1595 – 1642)
- Friedrich Burgmüller (1806–1874)
- Norbert Burgmüller (1810–1836)
- Geoffrey Burgon (1941–2010)
- Mutal Burhonov (1916–2002)
- Sonny Burke (1914–1980)
- Paul Burkhard (1911–1977)
- Willy Burkhard (1900–1955)
- Ladislav Burlas (1927–2024)
- Harry Burleigh (1866–1949)
- R D Burman (1939–1994)
- S D Burman (1906–1975)
- Charles Burney (1726–1814)
- Diana Burrell (born 1948)
- Alfred Burt (1920–1954)
- Canary Lee Burton (born 1942)
- Alan Bush (1900–1995)
- Adolf Busch (1891–1952)
- Geoffrey Bush (1920–1998)
- Antoine Busnois (Busnoys) (c. 1430 – 1492)
- Ferruccio Busoni (1866–1924)
- Howard J. Buss (born 1951)
- Henri Büsser (1872–1973)
- Sylvano Bussotti (1931–2021)
- Pieter Bustijn (c. 1649 – 1729)
- Eugene O'Brien (born 1945)
- Thomas O'Brien Butler (1861–1915)
- Nigel Butterley (1935–2022)
- Arthur Butterworth (1923–2014)
- George Butterworth (1885–1916)
- Johann Heinrich Buttstett (1666–1727)
- Jacques Buus (c. 1500 – 1565)
- Dieterich Buxtehude (1637–1707)
- Arturo Buzzi-Peccia (1854?–1943)
- Antonio Buzzolla (1815–1871)
- William Byrd (c. 1540 – 1623)
- Don Byron (born 1958)
- Britta Byström (born 1977)
- Byttering (fl. c. 1410–1420)

== C ==
- Gayane C'ebotaryan (1918–1998)
- Manuel Fernández Caballero (1835–1906)
- Juan Cabanilles (1644–1712)
- Antonio de Cabezón (c. 1510 – 1566)
- Hernando de Cabezón (1541–1602)
- Facundo Cabral (1937–2011)
- Francesca Caccini (1587 – c. 1640)
- Giulio Caccini (1551–1618)
- Settimia Caccini (1591–1638)
- Pierre Cadéac (fl. 1538–1556)
- Charles Wakefield Cadman (1881–1946)
- Pasquale Cafaro (1715/1716–1787)
- John Cage (1912–1992)
- Antonio Cagnoni (1828–1896)
- Gioseppe Caimo (c. 1545 – 1584)
- Louis de Caix d'Hervelois (c. 1670 – c. 1760)
- Raffaele Calace (1863–1934)
- Geneviève Calame (1946–1993)
- Antonio Caldara (1671–1736)
- Antonio Calegari (1757–1828)
- Maria Cattarina Calegari (1644–1675)
- John Baptiste Calkin (1827–1905)
- Joseph Callaerts (1838–1901)
- Rafael Calleja Gómez (1870–1938)
- Sethus Calvisius (1556–1615)
- Robert Cambert (c. 1628 – 1677)
- Giuseppe Cambini (1746 – c. 1825)
- John Cameron (born 1944)
- Charles Camilleri (1931–2009)
- Michel Camilo (born 1954)
- Bartolomeo Campagnoli (1751–1827)
- Fabio Campana (1819–1882)
- Alexander Campbell (1764–1824)
- Louis Campbell-Tipton (1877–1921)
- François van Campenhout (1779–1848)
- Thomas Campion (1567–1620)
- Carlo Antonio Campioni (1720–1788)
- Conrado del Campo (1878–1953)
- André Campra (1660–1744)
- Francisco Canaro (1888–1964)
- Édith Canat de Chizy (born 1950)
- Amélie-Julie Candeille (1767–1834)
- David DeBoor Canfield (born 1950)
- Cornelius Canis (de Hondt) (c. 1500/1510–1561)
- Christian Cannabich (1731–1798)
- Enrico Cannio (1874–1949)
- Joseph Canteloube (1879–1957)
- David Victor Canter (born 1944)
- Philippe Capdenat (1934–2025)
- Pierre Capdevielle (1906–1969)
- Vincenzo Capirola (1474 – after 1548)
- André Caplet (1878–1925)
- Samuel Capricornus (1628–1665)
- Mario Capuana (c. 1600 – 1647)
- Giuseppe Antonio Capuzzi (1755–1818)
- Marchetto Cara (c. 1465 – 1525)
- Michele Carafa (1787–1872)
- Matteo Carcassi (1792–1853)
- Cornelius Cardew (1936–1981)
- Manuel Cardoso (1566–1650)
- Cristoforo Caresana (c. 1640 – 1709)
- Henry Carey (1687–1743)
- Giacomo Carissimi (1605–1674)
- Robert Carl (born 1954)
- Bruce Carlson (born 1944)
- Mark Carlson (born 1952)
- Hoagy Carmichael (1899–1981)
- John Carmichael (born 1930)
- Roberto Carnevale (born 1966)
- Ramon Carnicer i Batlle (1789–1855)
- Julio de Caro (1899–1980)
- Turlough Carolan (1670–1738)
- Firminus Caron (fl. c. 1460–c. 1475)
- Fabritio Caroso (c. 1527/1535–after 1600)
- Gary Carpenter (born 1951)
- John Alden Carpenter (1876–1951)
- Carpentras (Elzéar Genet) (c. 1470 – 1548)
- Benjamin Carr (1768–1831)
- Edwin Carr (1926–2003)
- António Carreira (fl. 1551–1589)
- James P. Carrell (1787–1854)
- Teresa Carreño (1853–1917)
- Julián Carrillo (1875–1965)
- Antonio Casimir Cartellieri (1772–1807)
- Andrew Carter (1939–2026)
- Elliott Carter (1908–2012)
- Ferdinando Carulli (1770–1841)
- João de Sousa Carvalho (1745 – c. 1799)
- Robert Carver (c. 1484/1487–c. 1570)
- Doreen Carwithen (1922–2003)
- Tristram Cary (1925–2008)
- Benet Casablancas (born 1956)
- Henri Casadesus (1879–1947)
- Marius Casadesus (1892–1981)
- Robert Casadesus (1899–1972)
- Robert-Guillaume Casadesus (1878–1940)
- Romeo Cascarino (1922–2002)
- Giovanni da Cascia (14th century)
- Alfredo Casella (1883–1947)
- Philip Cashian (born 1963)
- John Casken (born 1949)
- Gaspar Cassadó (1897–1966)
- Patrick Cassidy (born 1956)
- Álvaro Cassuto (1938–2026)
- Bellerofonte Castaldi (c. 1581 – 1649)
- Luigi Castellacci (1797–1845)
- Rafael Antonio Castellanos (c. 1725 – 1791)
- Dario Castello (c. 1590 – c. 1658)
- Mario Castelnuovo-Tedesco (1895–1968)
- Niccolò Castiglioni (1932–1996)
- Alexis de Castillon (1838–1873)
- Samuel Castriota (1885–1932)
- Juan José Castro (1895–1968)
- Maddalena Casulana (c. 1544 – 1566/1583)
- Alfredo Catalani (1854–1893)
- Daniel Catán (1949–2011)
- Diomedes Cato (c. 1560/1565–1618)
- Georgy Catoire (1861–1926)
- Eduard Caudella (1841–1924)
- Emilio de' Cavalieri (c. 1550 – 1602)
- Francesco Cavalli (1602–1676)
- Girolamo Cavazzoni (c. 1525 – after 1577)
- Maurizio Cazzati (1616–1678)
- Rodrigo de Ceballos (c. 1525/1530–1581)
- Carlo Cecere (1706–1761)
- Levi Celerio (1910–2002)
- Francesco Cellavenia (fl. 1538–1563)
- Joan Cererols (1618–1680)
- Bohuslav Matěj Černohorský (1684–1742)
- Pierre Certon (fl. from 1529; died 1572)
- Ignacio Cervantes (1847–1905
- Sergio Cervetti (born 1940)
- Giacobbe Cervetto (c. 1682 – 1783)
- Giovanni Martino Cesare (c. 1590 – 1667)
- Johannes Cesaris (fl. c. 1406–1417)
- Sulpitia Cesis (born 1577; fl. 1619)
- Antonio Cesti (1623–1669)
- Emmanuel Chabrier (1841–1894)
- George Whitefield Chadwick (1854–1931)
- David Chaillou (born 1971)
- Ippolito Chamaterò (c. 1535/1540–after 1592)
- Cécile Chaminade (1857–1944)
- Claude Champagne (1891–1965)
- Jacques Champion de Chambonnières (1601/1602–1672)
- Nicolas Champion (c. 1475 – 1533)
- Gustave Charpentier (1860–1956)
- Marc-Antoine Charpentier (1643–1704)
- Abram Chasins (1903–1987)
- Stephen Chatman (born 1950)
- Lambert Chaumont (c. 1635 – 1712)
- Ernest Chausson (1855–1899)
- Carlos Chávez (1899–1978)
- Charles Chaynes (1925–2016)
- Nicolas Chédeville (1705–1782)
- Fortunato Chelleri (1690–1757)
- Qigang Chen (born 1951)
- Xiaoyong Chen (born 1955)
- Chen Gang (born 1935)
- Chen Yi (born 1953)
- Ch'eng Mao-yün (1900–1957)
- Yury Chernavsky (1947–2025)
- Luigi Cherubini (1760–1842)
- Pavel Chesnokov (1877–1944)
- Paul Chihara (born 1938)
- Thomas Chilcot (c. 1707 – 1766)
- Bob Chilcott (born 1955)
- William Child (1606–1697)
- Unsuk Chin (born 1961)
- Thomas Paul Chipp (1793–1870)
- Edmund Chipp (1823–1886)
- Erik Chisholm (1904–1965)
- Gian Paolo Chiti (born 1939)
- Frédéric Chopin (1810–1849)
- Jaehyuck Choi (b.1994)
- Hedwige Chrétien (1859–1944)
- Henning Christiansen (1932–2008)
- Jani Christou (1926–1970)
- Salvador Chuliá Hernández (1944–2025)
- Andreas Chyliński (c. 1590 – after 1635)
- Cesare Ciardi (1818–1877)
- Mikalojus Konstantinas Čiurlionis (1875–1911)
- Johannes Ciconia (c. 1370 – 1412)
- Ippolito Ciera (fl. 1546–1561)
- Antonio Cifra (1584–1629)
- Francesco Cilea (1866–1950)
- Giovanni Paolo Cima (c. 1570 – after 1622)
- Domenico Cimarosa (1749–1801)
- Milo Cipra (1906–1985)
- Giovanni Battista Cirri (1724–1808)
- Avery Claflin (1898–1979)
- Philip Greeley Clapp (1888–1954)
- Giovanni Carlo Maria Clari (1677–1754)
- Jeremiah Clarke (c. 1674 – 1707)
- Kenny Clarke (1914–1985)
- Rebecca Clarke (1886–1979)
- Rhona Clarke (born 1958)
- Ann Cleare (born 1983)
- Siobhán Cleary (born 1970)
- Johnny Clegg (1953–2019)
- Jacob Clemens non Papa (c. 1510/1515–c. 1555)
- Aldo Clementi (1925–2011)
- Muzio Clementi (1752–1832)
- Louis-Nicolas Clérambault (1676–1749)
- Pierre Clereau (fl. 1539–1570)
- Nycasius de Clibano (fl. 1457–1497)
- Jheronimus de Clibano (c. 1459 – 1503)
- Frederic Cliffe (1857–1931)
- George S. Clinton (born 1947)
- Anna Clyne (born 1980)
- Albert Coates (1882–1953)
- Eric Coates (1886–1957)
- Gloria Coates (1938–2023)
- Leon Coates (1937–2023)
- Gioacchino Cocchi (1720–1804)
- Carlo Coccia (1782–1873)
- Julian Cochran (born 1974)
- Adrianus Petit Coclico (1499 – after 1562)
- Martín Codax (fl. c. 1240–1270)
- Manuel Rodrigues Coelho (c. 1555 – c. 1635)
- Louis Coerne (1870–1922)
- Philip Cogan (1750–1833)
- Robert Cogan (1930–2021)
- Rhoda Coghill (1903–2000)
- George M. Cohan (1878–1942)
- James Cohn (1928–2021)
- Gautier de Coincy (1177–1236)
- Cy Coleman (1929–2004)
- Valerie Coleman (born 1970)
- Avril Coleridge-Taylor (1903–1998)
- Samuel Coleridge-Taylor (1875–1912)
- Cecil Coles (1888–1918)
- Michael Colgrass (1932–2019)
- François Colin de Blamont (1690–1760)
- Lelio Colista (1629–1680)
- Pascal Collasse (1649–1709)
- Lawrance Collingwood (1887–1982)
- Anthony Collins (1893–1963)
- Edward Joseph Collins (1886–1951)
- Houston Collisson (1865–1920)
- Giovanni Paolo Colonna (1637–1695)
- Russ Columbo (1908–1934)
- Joan Baptista Comes (1568–1643)
- Loyset Compère (c. 1445 – 1518)
- Graziella Concas (born 1970)
- Edward T. Cone (1917–2004)
- Giovanni Battista Conforti (fl. 1550–1570)
- Zez Confrey (1895–1971)
- Justin Connolly (1933–2020)
- August Conradi (1821–1873)
- Marius Constant (1925–2004)
- Paul Constantinescu (1909–1963)
- Sylvia Constantinidis (born 1962)
- David Conte (born 1955)
- Francesco Bartolomeo Conti (1681–1732)
- Salvador Contreras (1910–1982)
- Charles Crozat Converse (1832–1918)
- Frederick Converse (1871–1940)
- Girolamo Conversi (fl. 1572–1575)
- Will Marion Cook (1869–1944)
- Arnold Cooke (1906–2005)
- Benjamin Cooke (1734–1793)
- Thomas Simpson Cooke (1782–1848)
- David Cope (1941–2025)
- Aaron Copland (1900–1990)
- Carmine Coppola (1910–1991)
- John Coprario (John Cooper) (c. 1575 – 1626)
- William Corbett (1680–1748)
- Sidney Corbett (born 1960)
- Francesco Corbetta (c. 1615 – 1681)
- Frank Corcoran (born 1944)
- Frederick Corder (1852–1932)
- Baude Cordier (fl. c. 1400?)
- Arcangelo Corelli (1653–1713)
- Azio Corghi (1937–2022)
- Miguel Ángel Coria (1937–2016)
- John Corigliano (born 1938)
- Johannes Cornago (Juan Cornago) (c. 1400 – after 1475)
- Peter Cornelius (1824–1874)
- Peeter Cornet (c. 1570/1580–1633)
- William Cornysh the younger (1465?–1523)
- Ronald Corp (1951–2025)
- Francisco Correa de Arauxo (1584–1654)
- Manuel Correia (c. 1600 – 1653)
- Gaspard Corrette (c. 1670–before 1733)
- Michel Corrette (1707–1795)
- Francesco Corteccia (1502–1571)
- Ramiro Cortés (1933–1984)
- Napoléon Coste (1805–1883)
- Guillaume Costeley (c. 1530 – 1606)
- Elvis Costello (born 1954)
- Phil Coulter (born 1942)
- Armand-Louis Couperin (1727–1789)
- François Couperin (1668–1733)
- Louis Couperin (c. 1626 – 1661)
- Jean Courtois (fl. 1530–1545)
- Joachim Thibault de Courville (fl. from c. 1567; died 1581)
- Noël Coward (1899–1973)
- Henry Cowell (1897–1965)
- Frederic Cowen (1852–1935)
- Chiara Margarita Cozzolani (1602 – c. 1678)
- Franz Cramer (1772–1848)
- Johann Baptist Cramer (1771–1858)
- Wilhelm Cramer (1746–1799)
- Sibylla Bailey Crane (1851–1902)
- Jean Cras (1879–1932)
- John Craton (born 1953)
- Ruth Crawford Seeger (1901–1953)
- Thomas Crecquillon (c. 1505/1515–1557)
- Noah Creshevsky (1945–2020)
- Lyell Cresswell (1944–2022)
- Paul Creston (1906–1985)
- Henri-Jacques de Croes (1705–1786)
- William Croft (1678–1727)
- William Crotch (1775–1847)
- Johann Crüger (1598–1662)
- David Crumb (born 1962)
- George Crumb (1929–2022)
- Bernhard Crusell (1775–1838)
- César Cui (1835–1918)
- Conrad Cummings (born 1948)
- Alvin Curran (born 1938)
- Sebastian Currier (born 1959)
- Joe Cutler (born 1968)
- Chaya Czernowin (born 1957)
- Carl Czerny (1791–1857)
- Holger Czukay (1938–2017)

== D ==
- Harry Dacre (1860–1922)
- Jerry Amper Dadap (born 1935)
- Jörgen Dafgård (born 1964)
- Ingolf Dahl (1912–1970)
- Nicolas Dalayrac (1753–1809)
- Marc-André Dalbavie (born 1961)
- Nancy Dalberg (1881–1949)
- Martin Dalby (1942–2018)
- Jeremy Dale Roberts (1934–2017)
- Lucio Dalla (1943–2012)
- Evaristo Felice Dall'Abaco (1675–1742)
- Luigi Dallapiccola (1904–1975)
- Burkhard Dallwitz (born 1959)
- Joan Ambrosio Dalza (fl. 1508)
- Alexander Damascene (died 1719)
- Jean-Michel Damase (1928–2013)
- Walter Damrosch (1862–1950)
- Ghiselin Danckerts (c. 1510 – c. 1565)
- Charles Dancla (1817–1907)
- Georges Dandelot (1895–1975)
- Jean-François Dandrieu (c. 1682 – 1738)
- Daniel Danielis (1635–1696)
- Richard Danielpour (born 1956)
- Alexandre Danilevsky (born 1957)
- Hart Pease Danks (1834–1903)
- John Dankworth (1927–2010)
- Mychael Danna (born 1958)
- Jeff Danna (born 1964)
- Franz Danzi (1763–1826)
- Louis-Claude Daquin (1763–1826)
- Alexander Dargomyzhsky (1813–1869)
- Adam Darr (1811–1866)
- Johann Friedrich Daube (1730–1797)
- Michael Daugherty (born 1954)
- Louis François Dauprat (1781–1868)
- Antoine Dauvergne (1713–1797)
- Shaun Davey (born 1948)
- John Davy (1763–1824)
- Félicien-César David (1810–1876)
- Ferdinand David (1810–1873)
- Johann Nepomuk David (1895–1977)
- Padre Davide da Bergamo (Felice Moretti) (1791–1863)
- Neil Davidge (born 1962)
- Mario Davidovsky (1934–2019)
- Hugh Davies (1943–2005)
- Peter Maxwell Davies (1934–2016)
- Walford Davies (1869–1941)
- Carl Davis (1936–2023)
- Don Davis (born 1957)
- Ananias Davisson (1780–1857)
- Richard Davy (c. 1465 – 1538?)
- Karl Davydov (Carl Davidoff) (1838–1889)
- Julian Dawes (born 1942)
- Jerome de Bromhead (born 1945)
- Arthur De Greef (1862–1940)
- Jan de Haan (born 1951)
- Reginald De Koven (1859–1920)
- Johan de Meij (born 1953)
- Jon Deak (born 1943)
- Raymond Deane (born 1953)
- Claude Debussy (1862–1918)
- Michel Decoust (born 1936)
- Edmond Dédé (1827–1903)
- Henning Dedekind (1562–1626)
- Jean-Michel Defaye (1932–2025)
- Elliot Del Borgo (1938–2013)
- David Del Tredici (1937–2023)
- Michel Richard Delalande (de Lalande) (1657–1726)
- Marcel Delannoy (1898–1962)
- Philibert Delavigne (c. 1690/1700–1750)
- Claire Delbos (1906–1959)
- Lex van Delden (1919–1988)
- Delia Derbyshire (1937–2001)
- Thierry Deleruyelle (born 1983)
- Léo Delibes (1836–1891)
- Charles Delioux (1825–1915)
- Frederick Delius (1862–1934)
- Azzolino Della Ciaja (1671–1755)
- Michielina Della Pietà (fl. c. 1701–1744)
- Norman Dello Joio (1913–2008)
- Claude Delvincourt (1888–1954)
- Giuseppe Demachi (1732 – c. 1791)
- Christoph Demantius (1567–1643)
- Jeanne Demessieux (1921–1968)
- Nickitas J. Demos (born 1962)
- Jörg Demus (1928–2019)
- Pietro Denis (1720–1790)
- William Denis Browne (1888–1915)
- Denis Le Grant (died 1352)
- Edison Denisov (1929–1996)
- Donnacha Dennehy (born 1970)
- Fabrizio Dentice (1539?–1581)
- Scipione Dentice (1560–1635)
- Luigi Denza (1846–1922)
- Mary Dering (1629–1704)
- Richard Dering (c. 1580 – 1630)
- Fabrizio De Rossi Re (1960)
- Victor De Sabata (1892–1967)
- Alfred Desenclos (1912–1971)
- Henri Desmarest (1661–1741)
- Paul Desmond (1924–1977)
- Alexandre Desplat (born 1961)
- Paul Dessau (1894–1979)
- Josef Dessauer (1798–1876)
- André Cardinal Destouches (1672–1749)
- Max Deutsch (1892–1982)
- Alma Deutscher (born 2005)
- François Devienne (1759–1803)
- Frédéric Devreese (1929–2020)
- James Di Pasquale (born 1941)
- Salvatore Di Vittorio (born 1967)
- Anton Diabelli (1781–1858)
- David Diamond (1915–2005)
- Alphons Diepenbrock (1862–1921)
- Bernard van Dieren (1887–1936)
- Albert Christoph Dies (1755–1822)
- Albert Dietrich (1829–1908)
- Charles Dieupart (c. 1670 – c. 1740)
- Alfredo Diez Nieto (1919–2021)
- Rudi Martinus van Dijk (1932–2003)
- Muttusvami Dikshitar (1775–1835)
- James Dillon (born 1950)
- Lawrence Dillon (born 1959)
- Violeta Dinescu (born 1953)
- Grigoras Dinicu (1889–1949)
- Paul Dirmeikis (born 1954)
- Girolamo Diruta (c. 1554 – after 1610)
- Hugo Distler (1908–1942)
- Carl Ditters von Dittersdorf (1739–1799)
- Antonius Divitis (Anthonius Rycke) (c. 1470 – c. 1530)
- Steve Dobrogosz (born 1956)
- Ignacy Feliks Dobrzyński (1807–1867)
- Simon Dobson (born 1981)
- Stephen Dodgson (1924–2013)
- Friedhelm Döhl (1936–2018)
- Theodor Döhler (1814–1856)
- Ernő Dohnányi (Ernst von Dohnányi) (1877–1960)
- Joannes Baptista Dolar (Jan Křtitel Tolar) (c. 1620 – 1673)
- Joe Dolce (born 1947)
- Johann Friedrich Doles (1715–1797)
- Charles Dollé (fl. 1735–1755; d. after 1755)
- Petrus de Domarto (fl. 1445–1455)
- František Domažlický (1913–1997)
- Carlo Domeniconi (born 1947)
- Jakob van Domselaer (1890–1960)
- Pino Donaggio (born 1941)
- Ignazio Donati (c. 1575 – 1638)
- Baldassare Donato (1529?–1603)
- Franco Donatoni (1927–2000)
- Stefano Donaudy (1879–1925)
- Gaetano Donizetti (1797–1848)
- Girolamo Donnini (died 1752)
- Jakob Dont (1815–1888)
- Cornelis Dopper (1870–1939)
- Árpád Doppler (1857–1927)
- Franz Doppler (1821–1883)
- Karl Doppler (1825–1900)
- Nicolao Dorati (c. 1513 – 1593)
- Gustave Doret (1866–1943)
- Daniel Dorff (born 1956)
- Avner Dorman (born 1975)
- Louis-Antoine Dornel (c. 1685 – c. 1765)
- Thomas Doss (born 1966)
- Nico Dostal (1895–1981)
- Friedrich Dotzauer (1783–1860)
- Celius Dougherty (1902–1986)
- James Douglas (1932–2022)
- Roy Douglas (1907–2015)
- John Thomas Douglass (1847–1886)
- Victor Dourlen (1780–1864)
- John Dowland (1563–1626)
- Robert Dowland (c. 1591 – 1641)
- John W. Downey (1927–2004)
- Patrick Doyle (born 1953)
- Roger Doyle (born 1949)
- Felix Draeseke (1835–1913)
- Antonio Draghi (c. 1634 – 1700)
- Giovanni Battista Draghi (c. 1640 – 1708)
- Domenico Dragonetti (1763–1846)
- Giovanni Dragoni (c. 1540 – 1598)
- Ervin Drake (1919–2015)
- Deborah Drattell (born 1956)
- Carl Wilhelm Drescher (1850–1925)
- Sem Dresden (1881–1957)
- Adam Drese (c. 1620 – 1701)
- Johann Samuel Drese (c. 1644 – 1716)
- Johann Wilhelm Drese (1677–1745)
- Paul Dresher (born 1951)
- Erwin Dressel (1909–1972)
- Cornelius Heinrich Dretzel (1697–1775)
- George Dreyfus (born 1928)
- Alexander Dreyschock (1818–1869)
- Felix Dreyschock (1860–1906)
- Riccardo Drigo (1846–1930)
- Madeleine Dring (1923–1977)
- Karl Ludwig Drobisch (1803–1854)
- Jacob Druckman (1928–1996)
- Georg Druschetzky (1745–1819)
- Learmont Drysdale (1866–1909)
- Du Mingxin (born 1928)
- Alexandra du Bois (born 1981)
- Eustache Du Caurroy (1549–1609)
- Amaury du Closel (1956–2024)
- Henri Du Mont (1610–1684)
- Édouard Du Puy (1770–1822)
- John W. Duarte (1919–2004)
- Leonora Duarte (1610–1678)
- Andreas Düben (1597–1662)
- Gustav Düben (1628–1690)
- Pierre Max Dubois (1930–1995)
- Théodore Dubois (1837–1924)
- William Duckworth (1943–2012)
- Jörg Duda (born 1968)
- François Dufault (1604–1670)
- Guillaume Dufay (Du Fay) (1397–1474)
- Arthur Duff (1899–1956)
- Paul Dukas (1865–1935)
- John Woods Duke (1899–1984)
- Vernon Duke (Vladimir Dukelsky) (1903–1969)
- Friedrich Dülon (1768–1826)
- Pierre Dumage (c. 1674 – 1751)
- Isaak Dunayevsky (1900–1955)
- Trevor Duncan (1924–2005)
- Thomas Dunhill (1877–1946)
- Egidio Duni (1708–1775)
- John Dunstaple (Dunstable) (c. 1390 – 1453)
- Henri Duparc (1848–1933)
- Jacques Duphly (1715–1789)
- G. Dupoitt (fl. 1420–1430)
- Jean-Louis Duport (1749–1819)
- Marcel Dupré (1886–1971)
- Albert Dupuis (1877–1967)
- Sylvain Dupuis (1856–1931)
- Francesco Durante (1684–1755)
- Louis Durey (1888–1979)
- Sebastián Durón (1660–1716)
- Lucien Durosoir (1878–1955)
- Maurice Duruflé (1902–1986)
- Pascal Dusapin (born 1955)
- František Xaver Dušek (1731–1799)
- Jan Ladislav Dussek (1760–1812)
- Sophia Dussek (1775–1847)
- Henri Dutilleux (1916–2013)
- Balys Dvarionas (1904–1972)
- Antonín Dvořák (1841–1904)
- Benjamin Dwyer (born 1965)
- George Dyson (1883–1964)

== E ==
- Brian Easdale (1909–1995)
- Michael East (1580–1648)
- John Eaton (1935–2015)
- Johann Georg Ebeling (1637–1676)
- Petr Eben (1929–2007)
- Dennis Eberhard (1943–2005)
- Anton Eberl (1765–1807)
- Johann Ernst Eberlin (1702–1762)
- Guglielmo Ebreo da Pesaro (c. 1420 – after 1484)
- Henry Eccles (1670–1742)
- John Eccles (1668–1735)
- Johann Gottfried Eckard (1735–1809)
- Sophie Carmen Eckhardt-Gramatté (1901–1974)
- Jean-Frédéric Edelmann (1749–1794)
- Lotten Edholm (1839–1930)
- Lars Edlund (1922–2013)
- Oscar Edelstein (1953 - )
- Ross Edwards (born 1943)
- Cecil Effinger (1914–1990)
- Klaus Egge (1906–1979)
- Joachim Nicolas Eggert (1779–1813)
- Werner Egk (1901–1983)
- Margriet Ehlen (born 1943)
- Heinrich Ehrlich (1822–1899)
- Henry Eichheim (1870–1942)
- Ernst Eichner (1740–1777)
- Ludovico Einaudi (born 1955)
- Gottfried von Einem (1918–1996)
- Hanns Eisler (1898–1962)
- Danny Elfman (born 1953)
- Edward Elgar (1857–1934)
- Anders Eliasson (1947–2013)
- Dror Elimelech (born 1956)
- Elisabeth Sophie of Mecklenburg (1613–1676)
- Heino Eller (1887–1970)
- Martin Ellerby (born 1957)
- Rosalind Ellicott (1857–1924)
- Duke Ellington (1899–1975)
- David Ellis (born 1933)
- Don Ellis (1934–1978)
- Vivian Ellis (1903–1996)
- Eloy d'Amerval (fl. 1455–1508)
- Jean-Claude Éloy (1938–2025)
- Mohamed El-Qasabgi (1892–1966)
- Luther Orlando Emerson (1820–1915)
- Maurice Emmanuel (1862–1938)
- Simon Emmerson (born 1950)
- Juan del Encina (1468 – c. 1529)
- George Enescu (1881–1955)
- Einar Englund (1916–1999)
- August Enna (1859–1939)
- Péter Eötvös (1944–2024)
- Donald Erb (1927–2008)
- Christian Erbach (1568/1573–1635)
- Heimo Erbse (1924–2005)
- Eduard Erdmann (1896–1958)
- Robert Erickson (1917–1997)
- Carsten Bo Eriksen (born 1973)
- Ferenc Erkel (1810–1893)
- Ulvi Cemal Erkin (1906–1972)
- Frédéric Alfred d'Erlanger (1868–1943)
- Philipp Heinrich Erlebach (1657–1714)
- Gustav Ernesaks (1908–1993)
- Heinrich Wilhelm Ernst (1812?–1865)
- Iván Erőd (1936–2019)
- Pasquale Errichelli (1730–1785)
- Thomas Erskine, 6th Earl of Kellie (1732–1781)
- Thierry Escaich (born 1965)
- Pedro de Escobar (c. 1465 – after 1535)
- Bartolomé de Escobedo (c. 1505 – 1563)
- Pozzi Escot (born 1933)
- Rudolf Escher (1912–1980)
- Andrei Eshpai (1925–2015)
- Michele Esposito (1855–1929)
- Karlheinz Essl (born 1960)
- João Rodrigues Esteves (1700–1751)
- Paschal de l'Estocart (1539?–after 1584)
- Julio Estrada (born 1943)
- Alvin Etler (1913–1973)
- José Evangelista (1943–2023)
- Franco Evangelisti (1926–1980)
- Ralph Evans (born 1953)
- Johan Evenepoel (born 1965)
- Victor Ewald (1860–1935)
- Eric Ewazen (born 1954)
- Joseph Leopold Eybler (1765–1846)
- Jacob van Eyck (c. 1590 – 1657)
- Ernest van der Eyken (1913–2010)

== F ==
- Martinus Fabri (fl. 1395–1400)
- Giacomo Facco (1676–1753)
- Michelangelo Faggioli (1666–1733)
- Francesco Nicola Fago (1677–1745)
- Philipp Fahrbach Jr. (1843–1894)
- Philipp Fahrbach Sr. (1815–1885)
- Blair Fairchild (1877–1933)
- Mohammed Fairouz (born 1985)
- Richard Faith (1926–2021)
- Rolande Falcinelli (1920–1996)
- Adam Falckenhagen (1697–1754)
- Michele Falco (c. 1688 – after 1732)
- Andrea Falconieri (1585/1586–1656)
- Leo Fall (1873–1925)
- Manuel de Falla (1876–1946)
- Michelangelo Falvetti (1642–1692)
- Guido Alberto Fano (1875–1961)
- Philip Michael Faraday (1875–1944)
- Hormoz Farhat (1928–2021)
- Giuseppe Farinelli (1769–1836)
- Iain Farrington (born 1977)
- Ferenc Farkas (1905–2000)
- John Farmer (c. 1570 – c. 1601)
- Giles Farnaby (c. 1565 – 1640)
- Gareth Farr (born 1968)
- Ernest Farrar (1885–1918)
- Ciarán Farrell (born 1969)
- Eibhlís Farrell (born 1953)
- Louise Farrenc (1804–1875)
- Arthur Farwell (1872–1952)
- Giovanni Battista Fasolo (c. 1598 – c. 1664/1665)
- Carl Friedrich Christian Fasch (1736–1800)
- Johann Friedrich Fasch (1688–1758)
- Guillaume Faugues (Fagus) (fl. c. 1460–1475)
- Sandford C. Faulkner (1803–1874)
- Gabriel Fauré (1845–1924)
- Robert Fayrfax (1464–1521)
- Reinhard Febel (born 1952)
- Johannes Fedé (Jean Sohier) (c. 1415 – c. 1477)
- Samuil Feinberg (1890–1962)
- Jindřich Feld (1925–2007)
- Morton Feldman (1926–1987)
- Eric Fenby (1906–1997)
- Philippe Fénelon (born 1952)
- George Fenton (born 1950)
- Francesco Feo (1691–1761)
- Louis Ferdinand (1772–1806)
- Ferdinand III, Holy Roman Emperor (1608–1657)
- Howard Ferguson (1908–1999)
- Stephen Ferguson
- Frank Ferko (born 1950)
- Giuseppe Ferlendis (1755–1802)
- Gaspar Fernandes (1566–1629)
- Agustín Fernández (born 1958)
- Oscar Lorenzo Fernández (1897–1948)
- Brian Ferneyhough (born 1943)
- John Fernström (1897–1961)
- Alfonso Ferrabosco the elder (Il Padre) (1543–1588)
- Alfonso Ferrabosco the younger (c. 1570 – 1628)
- Domenico Ferrabosco (1513–1574)
- Benedetto Ferrari (c. 1603 – 1681)
- Gabrielle Ferrari (1851–1921)
- Giacomo Gotifredo Ferrari (1763–1842)
- Luc Ferrari (1929–2005)
- Lorenzo Ferrero (born 1951)
- Giovanni Ferretti (c. 1540 – after 1609)
- Pierre-Octave Ferroud (1900–1936)
- Frederic Ernest Fesca (1789–1826)
- Willem de Fesch (1687–1761)
- Costanzo Festa (c. 1485/1490–1545)
- Sebastiano Festa (c. 1490/1495–1524)
- Michael Christian Festing (1705–1752)
- Richard Festinger (born 1948)
- François-Joseph Fétis (1784–1871)
- Antoine de Févin (c. 1470 – 1511/1512)
- Robert de Févin (fl. before 1500–c. 1515)
- Pierre Février (1696–1760)
- Josef Fiala (1748–1816)
- Zdeněk Fibich (1850–1900)
- Jacobo Ficher (1896–1978)
- John Field (1782–1837)
- Alexander von Fielitz (1860–1930)
- Giulio Fiesco (fl. 1550–1570)
- Siegfried Fietz (born 1946)
- Juan de Dios Filiberto (1885–1964)
- Arkady Filippenko (1912–1983)
- Henry Fillmore (1881–1956)
- Anton Fils (1733–1760)
- Heinrich Finck (1444/1445–1527)
- Hermann Finck (1527–1558)
- Irving Fine (1914–1963)
- Vivian Fine (1913–2000)
- Gottfried Finger (1660–1730)
- Ross Lee Finney (1906–1997)
- Michael Finnissy (born 1946)
- Aldo Finzi (1897–1945)
- Gerald Finzi (1901–1956)
- Jean-Joseph Fiocco (1686–1746)
- Joseph-Hector Fiocco (1703–1741)
- Pietro Antonio Fiocco (1654–1714)
- Valentino Fioravanti (1764–1837)
- Nicola Fiorenza (after 1700–1764)
- Federigo Fiorillo (1755 – c. 1823)
- Paolo da Firenze (Paolo Tenorista) (c. 1355 – c. 1436)
- Elena Firsova (born 1950)
- C. P. First (born 1960)
- Johann Fischer (1646–1716)
- Johann Caspar Ferdinand Fischer (1656–1746)
- Alexis Ffrench (born 1970)
- Domenico Fischietti (c. 1725 – c. 1810)
- Emmanuel Fisher (1921–2001)
- William Arms Fisher (1861–1948)
- Graham Fitkin (born 1963)
- Nicolas Flagello (1928–1994)
- Mateo Flecha the elder (1481–1553)
- Aloys Fleischmann (1910–1992)
- Aloys Fleischmann (Senior) (1880–1964)
- Étienne-Joseph Floquet (1748–1785)
- Pietro Floridia (1860–1932)
- Friedrich von Flotow (1812–1883)
- Carlisle Floyd (1926–2021)
- Dave Flynn (born 1977)
- William Foden (1860–1947)
- Carel Anton Fodor (1768–1846)
- Josef Bohuslav Foerster (1859–1951)
- Francesco Foggia (1603–1688)
- Giacomo Fogliano (da Moderna) (1468–1548)
- Yevstigney Fomin (1761–1800)
- Pierre Fontaine (c. 1380 – c. 1450)
- Giovanni Battista Fontana (c. 1571 – c. 1630)
- Alfonso Fontanelli (1557–1622)
- Jacqueline Fontyn (born 1930)
- Martin Fondse (born 1967)
- Arthur Foote (1853–1937)
- Joanna Forbes L'Estrange (born 1971)
- Jean Kurt Forest (1909–1975)
- Johann Nikolaus Forkel (1749–1818)
- Thomas Ford (1580–1648)
- Carlo Forlivesi (born 1971)
- Antoine Forqueray (1671–1745)
- Jean-Baptiste Forqueray (1699–1782)
- Nicolas Formé (1567–1638)
- Emanuel Aloys Förster (1748–1823)
- Georg Forster (c. 1510 – 1568)
- Kaspar Förster (the younger) (1616–1673)
- Cecil Forsyth (1870–1941)
- Malcolm Forsyth (1936–2011)
- Wesley Octavius Forsyth (1859–1937)
- Wolfgang Fortner (1907–1987)
- Johann Philipp Förtsch (1652–1732)
- Lukas Foss (1922–2009)
- François de Fossa (1775–1849)
- David Foster (born 1949)
- Stephen Foster (1826–1864)
- Pierre-Claude Foucquet (1694–1772)
- John Foulds (1880–1939)
- Frederick A. Fox (1931–2011)
- Toby Fox (Born 1991)
- Jean Françaix (1912–1997)
- Petronio Franceschini (1651–1680)
- Alberto Franchetti (1860–1942)
- Carlo Franchi (c. 1743 – after 1779)
- Auguste Franchomme (1808–1884)
- Jan Francisci (1691–1758)
- Magister Franciscus (fl. 1370–80)
- César Franck (1822–1890)
- Eduard Franck (1817–1893)
- Johann Wolfgang Franck (1644–1710)
- Melchior Franck (c. 1579 – 1639)
- Richard Franck (1858–1938)
- Hernando Franco (1532–1585)
- François Francoeur (1698–1787)
- Massimiliano Frani (born 1967)
- Gabriela Lena Frank (born 1972)
- Benjamin Frankel (1906–1973)
- Gisela Frankl (1860–1935)
- Ferdinand Fränzl (1767–1833)
- Ignaz Fränzl (1736–1811)
- Harry Lawrence Freeman (1869–1954)
- Luís de Freitas Branco (1890–1955)
- Johan Henrik Freithoff (1713–1767)
- Girolamo Frescobaldi (1583–1643)
- Jehan Fresneau (fl. 1468–1505)
- Franz Jakob Freystädtler (1761–1841)
- Peter Racine Fricker (1920–1990)
- Géza Frid (1904–1989)
- Rudolf Friml (1879–1972)
- Johannes Fritsch (1941–2010)
- Johann Jakob Froberger (1616–1667)
- Johannes Frederik Fröhlich (1806–1860)
- David Froom (1951–2022)
- William Henry Fry (1813–1864)
- Walter Frye (fl. c. 1443?–c. 1474?)
- Johann Nepomuk Fuchs (1842–1899)
- Kenneth Fuchs (born 1956)
- Robert Fuchs (1847–1927)
- Julius Fučík (1872–1916)
- Miguel de Fuenllana (fl. 1553–1578)
- Adam von Fulda (Adam of Fulda) (c. 1445 – 1505)
- Friedrich Funcke (1642–1699)
- Joseph Funk (1778–1862)
- Beat Furrer (born 1954)
- Wilhelm Furtwängler (1886–1954)
- Anton Bernhard Fürstenau (1792–1852)
- Johann Joseph Fux (1660–1741)
- Fuzzy (Jens Vilhelm Pedersen) (1939–2022)

== G ==
- Pierre Gabaye (1930–2000)
- Charles H. Gabriel (1856–1932)
- Thomas Gabriel (born 1957)
- Andrea Gabrieli (1532/1533?–1585)
- Giovanni Gabrieli (c. 1557 – 1612)
- Domenico Gabrielli (1651/1659–1690)
- Ossip Gabrilowitsch (1878–1936)
- Axel Gade (1860–1921)
- Jacob Gade (1879–1963)
- Niels Gade (1817–1890)
- Franchinus Gaffurius (1451–1522)
- Marco da Gagliano (1582–1643)
- Wenzel Gährich (1794–1864)
- Bernhard Gál (born 1971)
- Hans Gál (1890–1987)
- Cristóbal Galán (c. 1630 – 1684)
- Nancy Galbraith (born 1951)
- Michelagnolo Galilei (1575–1631)
- Vincenzo Galilei (c. 1520?–1591)
- Blas Galindo (1910–1993)
- Jack Gallagher (born 1947)
- Wenzel Robert von Gallenberg (1783–1839)
- Johann Ernst Galliard (1687–1749)
- Jacques Gallot (c. 1625 – 1696)
- Jacobus Gallus (Jacob Handl) (1550–1591)
- Baldassare Galuppi (1706–1785)
- German Galynin (1922–1966)
- Elisabetta de Gambarini (1731–1765)
- John Gamble (fl. from 1641, died 1687)
- Michael Gandolfi (born 1956)
- Kyle Gann (born 1955)
- Louis Ganne (1862–1923)
- Gara Garayev (1918–1982)
- J. Ryan Garber (born 1973)
- José Maurício Nunes Garcia (1767–1830)
- Antón García Abril (1933–2021)
- Carlos Gardel (1890–1935)
- Henry Balfour Gardiner (1877–1950)
- John Gardner (1917–2011)
- Zoltán Gárdonyi (1906–1986)
- Zsolt Gárdonyi (born 1946)
- Roopam Garg (born 1995)
- Giuseppe Gariboldi (1833–1905)
- Carlo Giorgio Garofalo (1886–1962)
- John Garth (1721–1810)
- Mathieu Gascongne (fl. 1517–1518)
- Francesco Gasparini (1661–1727)
- Quirino Gasparini (1721–1778)
- Florian Leopold Gassmann (1729–1774)
- Stanislao Gastaldon (1861–1939)
- Giovanni Giacomo Gastoldi (c. 1554 – 1609)
- Crawford Gates (1921–2018)
- Luigi Gatti (1740–1817)
- Philippe Gaubert (1879–1941)
- Denis Gaultier (1603–1672)
- Ennemond Gaultier (1575–1651)
- Jacques Gaultier (c. 1592 – after 1652)
- Pierre Gaultier (1599–1681)
- Pierre Gaveaux (1761–1825)
- Daniel E. Gawthrop (born 1949)
- Noel Gay (1898–1954)
- Giuseppe Gazzaniga (1743–1818)
- Thomas Augustine Geary (1775–1801)
- Georg Gebel (1709–1753)
- John Maxwell Geddes (1941–2017)
- Siegfried Geißler (1929–2014)
- Christian Geist (c. 1650 – 1711)
- Joseph Gelinek (1758–1825)
- Michael L. Geller (1937–2007)
- Francesco Geminiani (1687–1762)
- Pietro Generali (1773–1832)
- Augusto Gentile (1891–1932)
- Harald Genzmer (1909–2007)
- Jean-Nicolas Geoffroy (1633–1694)
- Steven Gerber (1948–2015)
- Roberto Gerhard (1896–1970)
- Hans Gerle (c. 1500 – 1570)
- Edward German (1862–1936)
- Friedrich Gernsheim (1839–1916)
- Jhan Gero (fl. 1540–1555)
- Karl Ludwig Gerok (1906–1975)
- George Gershwin (1898–1937)
- Georg Gerson (1790–1825)
- Charles-Hubert Gervais (1671–1744)
- Claude Gervaise (fl. 1540–1560)
- Bartholomäus Gesius (1562–1613)
- Carlo Gesualdo (1566–1613)
- Gordon Getty (born 1933)
- Frans Geysen (born 1936)
- Giorgio Federico Ghedini (1892–1965)
- Géry de Ghersem (1573/1575–1630)
- Johannes Ghiselin (Verbonnet) (fl. 1491–1507)
- Michael Giacchino (born 1967)
- Geminiano Giacomelli (Jacomelli) (1692–1740)
- Vittorio Giannini (1903–1966)
- Remo Giazotto (1910–1998)
- Christopher Gibbons (1615–1676)
- Ellis Gibbons (1573–1603)
- Orlando Gibbons (1583–1625)
- Armstrong Gibbs (1889–1960)
- Joseph Gibbs (1699–1788)
- Sarah Gibson (1988–2024)
- Miriam Gideon (1906–1996)
- Michael Gielen (1927–2019)
- Nicolas Gigault (c. 1627 – 1707)
- Eugène Gigout (1844–1925)
- Angelo Gilardino (1941–2022)
- Anthony Gilbert (1934–2023)
- Jean Gilbert (1879–1942)
- William W. Gilchrist (1846–1916)
- Jean Gilles (1668–1705)
- Don Gillis (1912–1978)
- Patrick Gilmore (1829–1892)
- Jan van Gilse (1881–1944)
- Paul Gilson (1865–1942)
- Alberto Ginastera (1916–1983)
- Giuseppe Giordani (Giordanello) (1751–1798)
- Tommaso Giordani (c. 1738 – 1806)
- Umberto Giordano (1867–1948)
- Giovanni Giorgi (fl. from 1719; d. 1762)
- Ruth Gipps (1921–1999)
- Janice Giteck (born 1946)
- Mauro Giuliani (1781–1828)
- Lodovico Giustini (1685–1743)
- Simon Gjoni (1926–1991)
- Detlev Glanert (born 1960)
- Peggy Glanville-Hicks (1912–1990)
- Louis Glass (1864–1936)
- Philip Glass (born 1937)
- Alexander Glazunov (1865–1936)
- Frederick Grant Gleason (1848–1903)
- Jackie Gleason (1916–1987)
- Reinhold Glière (1874–1956)
- Mikhail Glinka (1804–1857)
- Vinko Globokar (born 1934)
- John William Glover (1815–1899)
- Christoph Willibald Gluck (1714–1787)
- Mikhail Gnessin (1883–1957)
- Pietro Gnocchi (1689–1775)
- Henri Gobbi (1842–1920)
- Godard (fl. 1536 – c. 1560)
- Benjamin Godard (1849–1895)
- Félix Godefroid (1818–1897)
- Leopold Godowsky (1870–1938)
- Alexander Godunov (1949–1995)
- Roger Goeb (1914–1997)
- Alexander Goedicke (1877–1957)
- Alexander Goehr (1932–2024)
- Lucien Goethals (1931–2006)
- Hermann Goetz (1840–1876)
- Walter Goetze (1883–1961)
- Karel Goeyvaerts (1923–1993)
- Dean Goffin (1916–1984)
- Ernest Gold (1921–1999)
- Murray Gold (born 1969)
- Johann Gottlieb Goldberg (1727–1756)
- Aleksandr Goldenweiser (1875–1961)
- Edwin Franko Goldman (1878–1956)
- Károly Goldmark (1830–1915)
- Rubin Goldmark (1872–1936)
- Berthold Goldschmidt (1903–1996)
- Otto Goldschmidt (1829–1907)
- Jerry Goldsmith (1929–2004)
- Osvaldo Golijov (born 1960)
- John Golland (1942–1993)
- Jani Golob (born 1948)
- Evgeny Golubev (1910–1988)
- Nicolas Gombert (c. 1495 – c. 1560)
- Julia Gomelskaya (1964–2016)
- Antônio Carlos Gomes (1836–1896)
- Mikołaj Gomółka (c. 1535 – 1609?)
- Fernando González Casellas (1925–1998)
- Howard Goodall (born 1958)
- Isador Goodman (1909–1982)
- Ron Goodwin (1925–2003)
- Eugene Goossens (1893–1962)
- Grzegorz Gerwazy Gorczycki (c. 1665/1667–1734)
- Ludwig Göransson (born 1984)
- Michael Gordon (born 1956)
- Peter Gordon (born 1951)
- Henryk Górecki (1933–2010)
- John Goss (1800–1880)
- François-Joseph Gossec (1734–1829)
- Ralf Gothóni (born 1946)
- Jakov Gotovac (1895–1982)
- Louis Moreau Gottschalk (1829–1869)
- Clytus Gottwald (1925–2023)
- Claude Goudimel (1514/1520–1572)
- Glenn Gould (1932–1982)
- Morton Gould (1913–1996)
- Charles Gounod (1818–1893)
- Théodore Gouvy (1819–1898)
- Jacques de Gouy (c. 1610 – after 1650)
- Johann Grabbe (1585–1655)
- Louis Grabu (fl. 1665–1693)
- Kraig Grady (born 1952)
- Paul Graener (1872–1944)
- Christian Ernst Graf (1723–1804)
- Friedrich Hartmann Graf (1727–1795)
- Filippo Gragnani (1768–1820)
- Kenny Graham (1924–1997)
- Peter Graham (composer) (born 1958)
- Percy Grainger (1882–1961)
- Ron Grainer (1922–1981)
- Enrique Granados (1867–1916)
- Giovanni Battista Granata (1620/1621–1687)
- Alessandro Grandi (1586–1630)
- Philip Grange (born 1956)
- Bruno Granichstaedten (1879–1944)
- Donald Grantham (born 1947)
- Stéphane Grappelli (1908–1997)
- Carl Heinrich Graun (1704–1759)
- Johann Gottlieb Graun (c. 1702 – 1771)
- Christoph Graupner (1683–1760)
- Steve Gray (1944–2008)
- Caterina Benedicta Grazianini (fl. from 1705)
- Gaetano Greco (c. 1657 – c. 1728)
- Vicente Greco (1888–1924)
- Adolph Green (1914–2002)
- Jay Greenberg (born 1991)
- Maurice Greene (1696–1755)
- Edward Gregson (born 1945)
- Harry Gregson-Williams (born 1961)
- Rupert Gregson-Williams (born 1966)
- Eduard Grell (1800–1886)
- Nicolas Grenon (c. 1375 – 1456)
- Mark Gresham (born 1956)
- Antoine-Frédéric Gresnick (1755–1799)
- Alexander Gretchaninov (1864–1956)
- André Ernest Modeste Grétry (1741–1813)
- Lucile Grétry (1772–1790)
- Geoffrey Grey (1934–2023)
- Deirdre Gribbin (born 1967)
- Edvard Grieg (1843–1907)
- John Griesbach (1798–1875)
- Peter Griesbacher (1864–1933)
- Charles Griffes (1884–1920)
- Nicolas de Grigny (1672–1703)
- Franz Grill (c. 1756 – 1793)
- Giovanni Battista Grillo (died 1622)
- Grimace (fl. mid-to-late 14th century)
- Maria Margherita Grimani (born before 1700; fl. 1713–1718)
- Albert Grisar (1808–1869)
- Gérard Grisey (1946–1998)
- Ferde Grofé (1892–1972)
- Olaus Andreas Grøndahl (1847–1923)
- Cor de Groot (1914–1993)
- Carlo Grossi (c. 1634 – 1688)
- Estienne Grossin (fl. 1418–1421)
- Dietrich Ewald von Grotthuß (1751–1786)
- Eivind Groven (1901–1977)
- Franz Xaver Gruber (1787–1863)
- Heinz Karl Gruber (born 1943)
- Louis Gruenberg (1884–1964)
- Gioseffo Guami (Gioseffo da Lucca) (1542–1611)
- Camargo Guarnieri (1907–1993)
- Carlos Guastavino (1912–2000)
- Sofia Gubaidulina (1931–2025)
- Hildur Guðnadóttir (born 1982)
- Pierre Guédron (c. 1570 – c. 1620)
- Francisco Guerau (1649–1717/1722)
- Wellington Guernsey (1817–1885)
- Francisco Guerrero (1528–1599)
- Francisco Guerrero Marín (1951–1997)
- Christopher Guest (born 1948)
- Pietro Alessandro Guglielmi (1728–1804)
- Edward Guglielmino (born 1983)
- Jean-Adam Guilain (c. 1680 – after 1739)
- Louis-Gabriel Guillemain (1705–1770)
- Jean Guillou (1930–2019)
- Alexandre Guilmant (1837–1911)
- Ernest Guiraud (1837–1892)
- Friedrich Gulda (1930–2000)
- Adam Gumpelzhaimer (1559–1625)
- Gustav Gunsenheimer (1934–2026)
- Jesús Guridi (1886–1961)
- Cornelius Gurlitt (1820–1901)
- Manfred Gurlitt (1890–1973)
- Ivor Gurney (1890–1937)
- Mark Gustavson (born 1959)
- Juan Gutiérrez de Padilla (c. 1590 – 1664)
- Adolphe Gutmann (1819–1882)
- Adalbert Gyrowetz (1763–1850)

== H ==
- Johannes Haarklou (1847–1925)
- Georg Friedrich Haas (born 1953)
- Joseph Haas (1879–1960)
- Pavel Haas (1899–1944)
- Alois Hába (1893–1973)
- Carolus Hacquart (c. 1640 – 1701?)
- Henry Kimball Hadley (1871–1937)
- Johann Christian Friedrich Haeffner (1759–1833)
- Richard Hageman (1881–1966)
- Bernhard Joachim Hagen (1720–1787)
- Daron Hagen (born 1961)
- Konrad Hagius (c. 1550 – 1616)
- Reynaldo Hahn (1874–1947)
- Jakob Haibel (1762–1826)
- Alexei Haieff (1914–1994)
- Adolphus Hailstork (born 1941)
- Uzeyir Hajibeyov (1885–1948)
- Darko Hajsek (born 1959)
- Kimmo Hakola (born 1958)
- Fromental Halévy (1799–1862)
- Cristóbal Halffter (1930–2021)
- Ernesto Halffter (1905–1989)
- Roger Lee Hall (born 1942)
- Adam de la Halle (c. 1237?–1288)
- Sylvia Hallett (born 1953)
- Johan Halvorsen (1864–1935)
- Henri-Guillaume Hamal (1685–1752)
- Bengt Hambraeus (1928–2000)
- Marc-André Hamelin (born 1961)
- Gordon Hamilton (born 1982)
- Iain Hamilton (1922–2000)
- Marvin Hamlisch (1944–2012)
- Emilie Hammarskjöld (1821–1854)
- Franz Xaver Hammer (1741–1817)
- Jan Hammer (born 1948)
- Andreas Hammerschmidt (1611/1612–1675)
- Albert Hammond (born 1942)
- George Frideric Handel (1685–1759)
- W. C. Handy (1873–1958)
- Johann Nicolaus Hanff (1663–1711)
- Ronald Hanmer (1917–1994)
- James Hannigan (born 1971)
- Charles-Louis Hanon (1819–1900)
- Peter Hänsel (1770–1831)
- Howard Hanson (1896–1981)
- Kazuko Hara (1935–2014)
- John Harbison (born 1938)
- Carl Hardebeck (1869–1945)
- Mike Harding (born 1944)
- Edward W. Hardy (born 1992)
- Miina Härma (1864–1941)
- Don Harper (1921–1999)
- Richard Harris (born 1968)
- Roy Harris (1898–1979)
- Victor Harris (1869–1943)
- William Henry Harris (1883–1973)
- Julius Harrison (1885–1963)
- Lou Harrison (1917–2003)
- John Hartford (1937–2001)
- Stephen Hartke (born 1952)
- Walter Hartley (1927–2016)
- Hamilton Harty (1879–1941)
- Johan Peter Emilius Hartmann (1805–1900)
- Karl Amadeus Hartmann (1905–1963)
- Jonathan Harvey (1939–2012)
- Richard Harvey (born 1953)
- Basil Harwood (1859–1949)
- Johann Adolph Hasse (1699–1783)
- Peter Hasse (c. 1585 – 1640)
- Alphonse Hasselmans (1845–1912)
- Hans Leo Hassler (1564–1612)
- Dismas Hataš (1724–1777)
- Lucien Haudebert (1877–1963)
- Josef Matthias Hauer (1883–1959)
- Moritz Hauptmann (1792–1868)
- Siegmund von Hausegger (1872–1948)
- Miska Hauser (1822–1878)
- Valentin Haussmann (died c. 1611)
- William Haute (Hawte) (c. 1430 – 1497)
- Patrick Hawes (born 1958)
- Joseph Haydn (1732–1809)
- Michael Haydn (1737–1806)
- Philip Hayes (1738–1797)
- William Hayes (1708–1777)
- Hayne van Ghizeghem (c. 1445 – after 1476)
- Ronnie Hazlehurst (1928–2007)
- Hubert Klyne Headley (1906–1996)
- Wilfred Heaton (1918–2000)
- John Hebden (1712–1765)
- Jake Heggie (born 1961)
- Johann David Heinichen (1683–1729)
- Paavo Heininen (1938–2022)
- Anthony Philip Heinrich (1781–1861)
- Peter Arnold Heise (1830–1879)
- Steve Heitzeg (born 1959)
- Walter Hekster (1937–2012)
- Pieter Hellendaal (1721–1799)
- Barbara Heller (born 1936)
- Stephen Heller (1813–1888)
- Lupus Hellinck (c. 1494 – 1541)
- Robert Helps (1928–2001)
- Victor Hely-Hutchinson (1901–1947)
- Fletcher Henderson (1897–1952)
- Moya Henderson (born 1941)
- Hans Henkemans (1913–1995)
- Swan Hennessy (1866–1929)
- Fini Henriques (1867–1940)
- Henry VIII, King of England (1491–1547)
- Pierre Henry (1927–2017)
- Fanny Hensel (1805–1847)
- Adolf von Henselt (1814–1889)
- Hans Werner Henze (1926–2012)
- Victor Herbert (1859–1924)
- Johann Andreas Herbst (1588–1666)
- Ferdinand Hérold (1791–1833)
- Bernard Herrmann (1911–1975)
- Philippe Hersant (born 1948)
- Michael Hersch (born 1971)
- William Herschel (1738–1822)
- Johann Wilhelm Hertel (1727–1789)
- Hervé (Florimond Ronger) (1825–1892)
- Arthur Hervey (1855–1922)
- Heinrich von Herzogenberg (1843–1900)
- Kenneth Hesketh (born 1968)
- Hans-Joachim Hespos (1938–2022)
- Ernst Hess (1912–1968)
- Jean-Chrisostome Hess (1816–1900)
- Nigel Hess (born 1953)
- Kurt Hessenberg (1908–1994)
- Jacques Hétu (1938–2010)
- Richard Heuberger (1850–1914)
- James Hewitt (1770–1827)
- Juan Hidalgo (1614–1685)
- Frigyes Hidas (1928–2007)
- Hans Uwe Hielscher (born 1945)
- Jennifer Higdon (born 1962)
- Gavin Higgins (born 1983)
- Hildegard of Bingen (1098–1179)
- Henry Hiles (1826–1904)
- Alfred Hill (1870–1960)
- Edward Burlingame Hill (1872–1960)
- Ferdinand Hiller (1811–1885)
- Johann Adam Hiller (1728–1804)
- Lejaren Hiller (1924–1994)
- Friedrich Heinrich Himmel (1765–1814)
- Paul Hindemith (1895–1963)
- Matthew Hindson (born 1968)
- Alistair Hinton (born 1950)
- Yoshihisa Hirano (born 1971)
- Rozalie Hirs (born 1965)
- Joe Hisaishi (born 1950)
- Franz Hitz (1828–1891)
- Marija Hladnik Berden (1892–1924)
- Emil Hlobil (1901–1987)
- Christopher Hobbs (born 1950)
- Gilad Hochman (born 1982)
- Alun Hoddinott (1929–2008)
- Léonard de Hodémont (c. 1575 – 1639)
- Andreas Hofer (1629–1684)
- Paul Hofhaimer (1459–1537)
- Ernst Theodor Amadeus Hoffmann (1776–1822)
- Franz Anton Hoffmeister (1754–1812)
- Romanus Hoffstetter (1742–1815)
- Leopold Hofmann (1738–1793)
- Lee Hoiby (1926–2011)
- Anthony Holborne (c. 1545 – 1602)
- Joseph Holbrooke (1878–1958)
- Trevor Hold (1939–2004)
- Theodore Holland (1878–1947)
- Karl Höller (1907–1987)
- York Höller (born 1944)
- Alan Holley (1954–current)
- Heinz Holliger (born 1939)
- Robin Holloway (born 1943)
- Vagn Holmboe (1909–1996)
- Alfred Holmes (1837–1876)
- Augusta Holmès (1847–1903)
- Henry Holmes (1839–1905)
- John Holmes (fl. from 1599; died 1629)
- William Henry Holmes (1812–1885)
- Michael Holohan (born 1956)
- Gustav Holst (1874–1934)
- Simeon ten Holt (1923–2012)
- Simon Holt (born 1958)
- Bo Holten (born 1948)
- Ignaz Holzbauer (1711–1783)
- Adriana Hölszky (born 1953)
- Gottfried August Homilius (1714–1785)
- Sidney Homer (c. 1864 – 1953)
- Arthur Honegger (1892–1955)
- James Hook (1746–1827)
- Bill Hopkins (1943–1981)
- Hal Hopson (born 1933)
- Felix Horetzky (1796–1870)
- Joseph Horovitz (1926–2022)
- David Horne (born 1970)
- James Horner (1953–2015)
- William Horwood (fl. 1459–1484; died 1484)
- Toshio Hosokawa (born 1955)
- Mansoor Hosseini (born 1967)
- Hoste da Reggio (Bartolomeo Torresano) (c. 1520–1569)
- John Hothby (Johannes Ottobi) (c. 1430 – 1487)
- Nicolas Hotman (c. 1610 – 1663)
- Jacques-Martin Hotteterre (1674–1763)
- Stephen Hough (born 1961)
- Joachim van den Hove (c. 1567 – 1620)
- Alan Hovhaness (1911–2000)
- Emily Howard (born 1979)
- Joseph E. Howard (1867–1961)
- Elgar Howarth (1935–2025)
- Julia Ward Howe (1819–1910)
- Herbert Howells (1892–1983)
- Leonid Hrabovsky (born 1935)
- Tyzen Hsiao (1938–2015)
- Huang Ruo (born 1976)
- Jenő Hubay (1858–1937)
- Jean Hubeau (1917–1992)
- Hans Huber (1852–1921)
- Thaddäus Huber (1742–1798)
- Hucbald (c. 850–930)
- Jiří Hudec (1923–1996)
- Herbert Hughes (1882–1937)
- Robert Hughes (1912–2007)
- Johannes Alfred Hultman (1861–1942)
- Tobias Hume (c. 1569 – 1645)
- Pelham Humfrey (1647–1674)
- Bertold Hummel (1925–2002)
- Ferdinand Hummel (1855–1928)
- Franz Hummel (1939–2022)
- Johann Nepomuk Hummel (1778–1837)
- Joseph Friedrich Hummel (1841–1919)
- Engelbert Humperdinck (1854–1921)
- Richard Hundley (1931–2018)
- Jean Huré (1877–1930)
- Conrad Friedrich Hurlebusch (1691–1765)
- William Hurlstone (1876–1906)
- Lukas Hurník (born 1967)
- Karel Husa (1921–2016)
- Henry Holden Huss (1862–1953)
- Jenő Huszka (1875–1960)
- Anselm Hüttenbrenner (1794–1868)
- Albert Huybrechts (1899–1938)
- Constantijn Huygens (1596–1687)
- Jason Kao Hwang (born 1957)
- Richard Hygons (c. 1435 – c. 1509)
- Søren Hyldgaard (1962–2018)

== I ==
- Jacques Ibert (1890–1962)
- Alois Ickstadt (born 1930)
- Airat Ichmouratov (born 1973)
- Akira Ifukube (1916–2006)
- Ilayaraaja (born 1943)
- Márton Illés (born 1975)
- Andrew Imbrie (1921–2007)
- Sigismondo d'India (c. 1582 – 1629)
- Vincent d'Indy (1851–1931)
- Marc'Antonio Ingegneri (1535/1536–1592)
- Mikhail Ippolitov-Ivanov (1859–1935)
- Francis Ireland (1721–1784)
- John Ireland (1879–1962)
- Juan Francés de Iribarren (1699–1767)
- Miguel de Irízar (1635–1684)
- Heinrich Isaac (c. 1450/1455–1517)
- Sigurd Islandsmoen (1881–1964)
- Nicolas Isouard (1775–1818)
- Jānis Ivanovs (1906–1983)
- Volodymyr Ivasiuk (1949–1979)
- Charles Ives (1874–1954)
- Simon Ives (1600–1662)
- Jean Eichelberger Ivey (1923–2010)

== J ==
- Steve Jablonsky (born 1970)
- Francis Jackson (1917–2022)
- Michael Jackson (1958–2009)
- Robin Jackson (born 1979)
- Tony Jackson (1876–1921)
- William Jackson (1730–1803)
- Gordon Jacob (1895–1984)
- Frederick Jacobi (1891–1952)
- Victor Jacobi (Jakabfi Viktor) (1883–1921)
- Jens Bjerre Jacobsen (1903–1986)
- Jacquet de Mantua (Jachet de Mantoue) (1483–1559)
- Salomon Jadassohn (1831–1902)
- Hyacinthe Jadin (1776–1800)
- Louis-Emmanuel Jadin (1768–1853)
- Alfred Jaëll (1832–1882)
- Stephen Jaffe (born 1954)
- Edward Jakobowski (1858–1927)
- Prenkë Jakova (1917–1969)
- Philip James (1890–1975)
- Jan z Lublina (fl. 1537–1548)
- Leoš Janáček (1852–1928)
- Clément Janequin (c. 1485 – 1558)
- Johann Gottlieb Janitsch (1708–1763)
- Leopold Jansa (1795–1875)
- Guus Janssen (born 1951)
- Peter Janssens (1934–1998)
- Antonius Janue (fl. c. 1460)
- Jean Japart (fl. c. 1474–1481)
- Armas Järnefelt (1869–1958)
- Georg Jarno (1868–1920)
- Ivan Mane Jarnović (Giornovichi) (1747–1804)
- Jean Michel Jarre (born 1948)
- Maurice Jarre (1924–2009)
- Michael Jarrell (born 1958)
- Adam Jarzębski (c. 1590 – c. 1648)
- Maurice Jaubert (1900–1940)
- Harris Jayaraj (born 1975)
- Johannes Jeep (1581/1582–1644)
- George Jeffreys (c. 1610 – 1685)
- Jehan de Lescurel(fl. early 14th century)
- Sándor Jemnitz (1890–1963)
- John Jenkins (1592–1678)
- Karl Jenkins (born 1944)
- Davorin Jenko (1835–1914)
- Thomas Jennefelt (born 1954)
- Gustav Jenner (1865–1920)
- David Jennings (born 1972)
- Leon Jessel (1871–1942)
- Willem Jeths (born 1959)
- Maistre Jhan (c. 1485 – 1538)
- František Jiránek (1698–1778)
- Joseph Joachim (1831–1907)
- João IV (John IV of Portugal) (1603–1656)
- Antônio Carlos Jobim (1927–1994)
- Gunnar Johansen (1906–1991)
- Alan John (born 1958)
- David C. Johnson (1940–2021)
- David Earle Johnson (died 1998)
- David N. Johnson (1922–1987)
- John Johnson (fl. 1579–1594)
- Laurie Johnson (1927–2024)
- Robert Johnson (c. 1583 – c. 1633)
- Tom Johnson (1939–2024)
- Ben Johnston (1926–2019)
- Fergus Johnston (born 1959)
- Jim Johnston (born 1959)
- Betsy Jolas (born 1926)
- André Jolivet (1905–1974)
- Niccolò Jommelli (1714–1774)
- Jens Joneleit (born 1968)
- Daniel Jones (1912–1993)
- Edwin Arthur Jones (1853–1911)
- Quincy Jones (1933–2024)
- Richard Jones (late 17th century – 1744)
- Robert Jones (c. 1577 – 1617)
- Ron Jones (born 1954)
- Samuel Jones (born 1935)
- Joseph Jongen (1873–1953)
- Scott Joplin (c. 1868 – 1917)
- Mihail Jora (1891–1971)
- Jens Josef (born 1967)
- Bradley Joseph (born 1965)
- Tyler Joseph (born 1988)
- Wilfred Josephs (1927–1997)
- Josquin des Prez (c. 1450/1455–1521)
- John Joubert (1927–2019)
- Gilles Joye (c. 1424/1425–1483)
- T. R. G. Jozé (1853–1924)
- Hans Judenkünig (Judenkönig) (c. 1445/1450–1526)
- Gilles Jullien (c. 1651/1653–1703)
- Louis Antoine Jullien (1812–1860)
- Junkie XL (born 1967)
- Paul Juon (1872–1940)

== K ==
- Dmitri Kabalevsky (1904–1987)
- Miloslav Kabeláč (1908–1979)
- Jeronimas Kačinskas (1907–2005)
- Camara Kambon (born 1973)
- Bert Kaempfert (1924–1980)
- Mauricio Kagel (1931–2008)
- Yuki Kajiura (born 1965)
- Vasily Kalinnikov (1866–1901)
- Johannes Kalitzke (born 1959)
- Jan Kalivoda (Kalliwoda) (1801–1866)
- Friedrich Kalkbrenner (1785–1849)
- Emmerich Kálmán (1882–1953)
- Manolis Kalomiris (1883–1962)
- Antonín Kammel (1730–1788)
- Shigeru Kan-no (born 1959)
- Giya Kancheli (1935–2019)
- John Kander (born 1927)
- Yoko Kanno (born 1964)
- Yugo Kanno (born 1977)
- Božidar Kantušer (1921–1999)
- Artur Kapp (1878–1952)
- Eugen Kapp (1908–1996)
- Vítězslava Kaprálová (1915–1940)
- Johannes Hieronymus Kapsberger (c. 1580 – 1651)
- Nikolai Kapustin (1937–2020)
- Sigfrid Karg-Elert (1877–1933)
- Mieczysław Karłowicz (1876–1909)
- Kjell Karlsen (1931–2020)
- Kjell Mørk Karlsen (Born 1947)
- Jurgis Karnavičius (1884–1941)
- Laura Karpman (born 1959)
- Leonard Kastle (1929–2011)
- Jean-Georges Kastner (1810–1867)
- Elena Kats-Chernin (born 1957)
- Rudolf Kattnigg (1895–1955)
- Georgy L'vovich Katuar (1861–1926)
- Georg Katzer (1935–2019)
- Hugo Kauder (1888–1972)
- Georg Friedrich Kauffmann (1679–1735)
- Hiba Kawas (born 1972)
- Motoharu Kawashima (born 1972)
- Yakov Kazyansky (born 1948)
- William Henry Kearns (1794–1846)
- John Keeble (1711–1786)
- Reinhard Keiser (1674–1739)
- David Kellner (1670–1748)
- Ernest Augustus Kellner (1792–1839)
- Johann Christoph Kellner (1736–1803)
- Johann Peter Kellner (1705–1772)
- Bryan Kelly (1934–2026)
- Michael Kelly (1762–1826)
- T. C. Kelly (1917–1985)
- Hugh Kellyk (fl. c. 1480)
- Joannes Florentius a Kempis (1635 – after 1711)
- Nicolaus à Kempis (c. 1600 – 1676)
- Martin Kennedy (born 1978)
- Vincent Kennedy (born 1962)
- Abraham van den Kerckhoven (c. 1618 – c. 1701)
- Mihkel Kerem (born 1981)
- Jacobus de Kerle (1531/1532–1591)
- Johann Caspar Kerll (1627–1693)
- Jerome Kern (1885–1945)
- Aaron Jay Kernis (born 1960)
- Albert Ketèlbey (1875–1959)
- Tristan Keuris (1946–1996)
- Aram Khachaturian (1903–1978)
- Rami Khalife (born 1981)
- Zulfiqar Jabbar Khan (born 1994)
- Ivan Khandoshkin (1747–1804)
- Yuri Khanon (born 1965)
- Tikhon Khrennikov (1913–2007)
- Aldine Silliman Kieffer (1840–1904)
- Friedrich Kiel (1821–1885)
- Wilhelm Kienzl (1857–1941)
- Wojciech Kilar (1932–2013)
- Wilhelm Killmayer (1927–2017)
- Earl Kim (1920–1998)
- Johann Erasmus Kindermann (1616–1655)
- Carole King (born 1942)
- Karl King (1891–1971)
- Matthew Peter King (c. 1773 – 1823)
- Gershon Kingsley (1922–2019)
- John Kinsella (1932–2021)
- George Kirbye (c. 1565 – 1634)
- Leon Kirchner (1919–2009)
- Theodor Kirchner (1823–1903)
- Volker David Kirchner (1942–2020)
- Johann Philipp Kirnberger (1721–1783)
- Don Kirshner (1934–2011)
- Simon Kiselicki (born 1974)
- Caspar Kittel (1603–1639)
- Johann Christian Kittel (1732–1809)
- Uuno Klami (1900–1961)
- Giselher Klebe (1925–2009)
- Leonhard Kleber (c. 1495 – 1556)
- Bernhard Klein (1793–1832)
- Gideon Klein (1919–1945)
- Richard Rudolf Klein (1921–2011)
- Julian Klemczyński (1807/1810–1851)
- Julius Klengel (1859–1933)
- Paul Klengel (1854–1935)
- Josef Klička (1855–1937)
- Karl Emanuel Klitzsch (1812–1889)
- Friedrich Klose (1862–1942)
- August Klughardt (1847–1902)
- Alexander Knaifel (1943–2024)
- Justin Heinrich Knecht (1752–1817)
- Andreas Kneller (1649–1724)
- Edward Knight (born 1961)
- Lev Knipper (1898–1974)
- Charles Knox (1929–2019)
- Sebastian Knüpfer (1633–1676)
- Oliver Knussen (1952–2018)
- Marcelo Koc (1918–2006)
- Miklós Kocsár (1933–2019)
- Zoltán Kodály (1882–1967)
- Charles Koechlin (1867–1950)
- Graeme Koehne (born 1956)
- Alfred Koerppen (1926–2022)
- Hans von Koessler (János Koessler) (1853–1926)
- Jan Koetsier (1911–2006)
- Karl Kohaut (1726–1784)
- Erland von Koch (1910–2009)
- Günter Kochan (1930–2009)
- Ludwig von Köchel (1800–1877)
- Ernesto Köhler (1849–1907)
- Siegfried Köhler (1923–2017)
- Ellis B. Kohs (1916–2000)
- Joonas Kokkonen (1921–1996)
- Walter Kollo (1878–1940)
- Lev Kolodub (1930–2019)
- Zhanna Kolodub (1930–2025)
- Pierre Kolp (born 1969)
- Karel Komzák I (1823–1893)
- Karel Komzák II (1850–1905)
- Koji Kondo (born 1961)
- Johann Balthasar König (1691–1758)
- Servaes de Koninck (c. 1654 – c. 1701)
- Marek Kopelent (1932–2023)
- Anders Koppel (born 1947)
- Herman David Koppel (1908–1998)
- Karel Blažej Kopřiva (1756–1785)
- Václav Jan Kopřiva (Urtica) (1708–1789)
- Nikolai Korndorf (1947–2001)
- Erich Wolfgang Korngold (1897–1957)
- Viktor Kosenko (1896–1938)
- Hans Kotter (c. 1485 – 1541)
- Jason Kouchak (born 1967)
- Serge Koussevitzky (1874–1951)
- Leopold Kozeluch (1747–1818)
- Marjan Kozina (1907–1965)
- Pylyp Kozytskiy (1893–1960)
- Antonín Kraft (c. 1749 – 1820)
- William Kraft (1923–2022)
- Mathilde Kralik (1857–1944)
- Hans Krása (1899–1944)
- Joseph Martin Kraus (1756–1792)
- Veronika Krausas (born 1962)
- Jaroslav Krček (born 1939)
- Johann Ludwig Krebs (1713–1780)
- Johann Tobias Krebs (1690–1762)
- Fritz Kreisler (1875–1962)
- Ernst Krenek (1900–1991)
- Franz Krenn (1818–1897)
- Conradin Kreutzer (1780–1849)
- Rodolphe Kreutzer (1766–1831)
- Adam Krieger (1634–1666)
- Johann Philipp Krieger (1649–1725)
- Johann Krieger (1651–1735)
- Rohan Kriwaczek (born 1968)
- Franz Krommer (1759–1831)
- Jean-Baptiste Krumpholz (1742–1790)
- Gail Kubik (1914–1984)
- Jan Křtitel Kuchař (1751–1829)
- Friedrich Wilhelm Kücken (1810–1882)
- Joseph Küffner (1776–1856)
- Hans Kugelmann (died 1542)
- Friedrich Kuhlau (1786–1832)
- Johann Kuhnau (1660–1722)
- Gerd Kühr (born 1952)
- August Kühnel (1645 – c. 1700)
- Jarosław Kukulski (1944–2010)
- Theodor Kullak (1818–1882)
- Eduard Künneke (1885–1953)
- Andreas Kunstein (born 1967)
- Friedrich Ludwig Aemilius Kunzen (1761–1817)
- Robert Kurka (1921–1957)
- Karol Kurpiński (1785–1857)
- György Kurtág (born 1926)
- Siegfried Kurz (1930–2023)
- Johann Sigismund Kusser (1660–1727)
- Toivo Kuula (1883–1918)
- Ilkka Kuusisto (1933–2025)
- Elisabeth Kuyper (1877–1953)
- Larysa Kuzmenko (born 1956)
- Otomar Kvěch (1950–2018)
- Kashan Admani (born 1979)

== L ==
- Michel de La Barre (c. 1675 – 1745)
- Louis de La Coste (c. 1675 – c. 1750)
- Adrien de La Fage (1801–1862)
- Nicolas de La Grotte (1530 – c. 1600)
- Élisabeth Jacquet de La Guerre (1659–1729)
- George de La Hèle (1547–1586)
- Alfred La Liberté (1882–1952)
- John La Montaine (1920–2013)
- Frank La Rocca (born 1951)
- Pierre de La Rue (c. 1452 – 1518)
- Théodore Labarre (1805–1870)
- Marcel Labey (1875–1968)
- Helmut Lachenmann (born 1935)
- Carl Lachmund (1853–1928)
- Franz Paul Lachner (1803–1890)
- Ignaz Lachner (1807–1895)
- Ludwig Wenzel Lachnith (1746–1820)
- Louis Lacombe (1818–1884)
- Paul Lacome (1838–1920)
- Bernard Germain Étienne de la Ville, Comte de Lacépède (1756–1825)
- Ezra Laderman (1924–2015)
- Paul Ladmirault (1877–1944)
- Lori Laitman (born 1955)
- László Lajtha (1892–1963)
- Édouard Lalo (1823–1892)
- José Ángel Lamas (1775–1814)
- Joseph Lamb (1887–1960)
- Walter Lambe (c. 1450 – after 1504)
- Charles Lucien Lambert (1828–1896)
- Constant Lambert (1905–1951)
- Michel Lambert (1610–1696)
- Joan Lamote de Grignon (1872–1949)
- Ricard Lamote de Grignon (1899–1962)
- Georges Lamothe (1842–1894)
- John Frederick Lampe (1703–1751)
- John Lanchbery (1923–2003)
- Siegfried Landau (1921–2007)
- Stefano Landi (1586/1587–1639)
- Francesco Landini (c. 1325/1335–1397)
- Marcel Landowski (1915–1999)
- Guillaume Landré (1905–1968)
- Lutz Landwehr von Pragenau (born 1963)
- Benjamin Johnson Lang (1837–1909)
- Bernhard Lang (born 1957)
- David Lang (born 1957)
- Hans Lang (1897–1968)
- Hans Lang (1908–1992)
- István Láng (1933–2023)
- Klaus Lang (born 1971)
- Margaret Ruthven Lang (1867–1972)
- Peter Erasmus Lange-Müller (1850–1926)
- Rued Langgaard (1893–1952)
- Jean Langlais (1907–1991)
- Honoré Langlé (1741–1807)
- Nicholas Lanier (1588–1666)
- Joseph Lanner (1801–1843)
- Colinet de Lannoy (fl. from 1476; died c. 1497)
- Daniel Lanois (born 1951)
- Paul Lansky (born 1944)
- Arnold de Lantins (fl. 1423–1432)
- Hugo de Lantins (fl. c. 1420–1430)
- André Laporte (born 1931)
- Isidore de Lara (1858–1935)
- Thomas Larcher (born 1963)
- John F. Larchet (1884–1967)
- Patrick Larley (born 1951)
- Libby Larsen (born 1950)
- Lars-Erik Larsson (1908–1986)
- Eduard Lassen (1830–1904)
- Orlande de Lassus (c. 1532 – 1594)
- Faustas Latėnas (1956–2020)
- William P. Latham (1917–2004)
- Gaetano Latilla (1711–1788)
- Jean de Latre (Delattre) (c. 1505/1510–1569)
- Felice Lattuada (1882–1962)
- Ken Lauber (born 1941)
- Wolff Jakob Lauffensteiner (1676–1754)
- Armas Launis (1884–1959)
- Morten Lauridsen (born 1943)
- Franz Lauska (1764–1825)
- Elodie Lauten (1950–2014)
- Angelo Francesco Lavagnino (1909–1987)
- Calixa Lavallée (1842–1891)
- Nikolaos Lavdas (1879–1940)
- Lewis Henry Lavenu (1818–1859)
- Célestin Lavigueur (1831–1885)
- Mario Lavista (1943–2021)
- Marc Lavry (1903–1967)
- Henry Lawes (1595–1662)
- William Lawes (1602–1645)
- Donald Lawrence (born 1961)
- Francesco de Layolle (1492 – c. 1540)
- Filip Lazăr (1894–1936)
- Henri Lazarof (1932–2013)
- Sylvio Lazzari (1857–1944)
- Simon Le Duc (Leduc) (1742–1777)
- Paul Le Flem (1881–1984)
- Dorian Le Gallienne (1915–1963)
- Claude Le Jeune (1528/1530–1600)
- Gaspard Le Roux (c. 1660 – 1707)
- Adrian Le Roy (c. 1520 – 1598)
- Jean-François Le Sueur (Lesueur) (1760–1837)
- Nicolas Lebègue (1631–1702)
- Firmin Lebel (fl. from c. 1540; died 1573)
- Francesca Lebrun (Franziska Danzi) (1756–1791)
- Ludwig August Lebrun (1752–1790)
- Paul-Henri-Joseph Lebrun (1863–1920)
- Jean-Marie Leclair (l'aîné) (1697–1764)
- Jean-Marie Leclair the younger (1703–1777)
- Alexandre Charles Lecocq (1832–1918)
- Ernesto Lecuona (1895–1963)
- Philip Ledger (1937–2012)
- George Alexander Lee (1802–1851)
- Noël Lee (1924–2013)
- Thomas Oboe Lee (born 1945)
- Benjamin Lees (1924–2010)
- Reinbert de Leeuw (1938–2020)
- Ton de Leeuw (1926–1996)
- Nicola Frances LeFanu (born 1947)
- Charles Édouard Lefebvre (1843–1917)
- Louis James Alfred Lefébure-Wély (1817–1869)
- Jean-Xavier Lefèvre (1763–1829)
- Dragica Legat Košmerl (1883–1956)
- Victor Legley (1915–1994)
- Luigi Legnani (1790–1877)
- Michel Legrand (1932–2019)
- Guillaume Legrant (Lemarcherier) (fl. 1405–1449)
- Johannes Legrant (fl. c. 1420–1440)
- Giovanni Legrenzi (1626–1690)
- Joseph Legros (1739–1793)
- Franz Lehár (1870–1948)
- Liza Lehmann (1862–1918)
- Leonard J. Lehrman (born 1949)
- Franz Lehrndorfer (1928–2013)
- Jerry Leiber (1933–2011)
- René Leibowitz (1913–1972)
- Jón Leifs (1899–1968)
- Walter Leigh (1905–1942)
- Kenneth Leighton (1929–1988)
- William Leighton (c. 1565 – 1622)
- Guillaume Lekeu (1870–1894)
- Edwin Lemare (1866–1934)
- Lorenz Lemlin (c. 1495 – after 1549)
- Jacques-Nicolas Lemmens (1823–1881)
- Jean-Baptiste Lemoyne (1751–1796)
- Erwin Lendvai (1882–1949)
- Kamilló Lendvay (1928–2016)
- Alfonso Leng (1894–1974)
- John Lennon (1940–1980)
- Nicholas Lens (born 1957)
- James Lentini (born 1958)
- Stefano Lentini (born 1974)
- Daniel Lentz (1942–2025)
- Georges Lentz (born 1965)
- Julius Lenzberg (1878–1956)
- Leonardo Leo (1694–1744)
- Isabella Leonarda (1620–1704)
- Ruggiero Leoncavallo (1857–1919)
- Gabriele Leone (c. 1735 – 1790)
- Franco Leoni (1864–1949)
- Léonin (fl. 1150s–1201)
- Mykola Leontovych (1877–1921)
- Leopold I, Holy Roman Emperor (1640–1705)
- Wassili Leps (1870–1942)
- Fred Lerdahl (born 1943)
- Xavier Leroux (1863–1919)
- Theodor Leschetizky (1830–1915)
- Henry Leslie (1822–1896)
- Franciszek Lessel (1780–1838)
- Oscar Levant (1906–1972)
- Richard Leveridge (1670–1758)
- Richard Michael Levey (1811–1899)
- Michaël Lévinas (born 1949)
- Marvin David Levy (1932–2015)
- David Lewin (1933–2003)
- Frank Lewin (1925–2008)
- Andrew Lewis (born 1963)
- Jeffrey Lewis (born 1942)
- Ignace Leybach (1817–1891)
- Georg Dietrich Leyding (1664–1710)
- Ulrich Leyendecker (1946–2018)
- Jean Lhéritier (L'Heritier; Lirithier) (c. 1480–after 1551)
- Fran Lhotka (1883–1962)
- Reginaldus Libert (fl. c. 1425–1435)
- Heinrich Lichner (1829–1898)
- Johann Georg Lickl (1769–1843)
- Cristiano Giuseppe Lidarti (1730–1795)
- Jorge Liderman (1957–2008)
- Ingvar Lidholm (1921–2017)
- Lowell Liebermann (born 1961)
- Peter Lieberson (1946–2011)
- Rolf Liebermann (1910–1999)
- Clement Liebert (fl. 1433–1454)
- Thurlow Lieurance (1878–1963)
- György Ligeti (1923–2006)
- Douglas Lilburn (1915–2001)
- Ingemar Liljefors (1906–1981)
- Ruben Liljefors (1871–1936)
- Giuseppe Lillo (1814–1863)
- Liza Lim (born 1966)
- Johannes de Limburgia (Johannes Vinandi) (fl. 1408?–1431)
- Limenius (fl. 128 BC)
- Armand Limnander (1814–1892)
- Paul Lincke (1866–1946)
- Magnus Lindberg (born 1958)
- Nils Lindberg (1933–2022)
- Oskar Lindberg (1887–1955)
- Adolf Fredrik Lindblad (1801–1878)
- Otto Lindblad (1809–1864)
- Bo Linde (1933–1970)
- Hans-Martin Linde (born 1930)
- Pär Lindgren (born 1952)
- Eugen Lindner (1858–1915)
- Peter Joseph von Lindpaintner (1791–1856)
- Jukka Linkola (born 1955)
- Thomas Linley the elder (1733–1795)
- Thomas Linley the younger (1756–1778)
- George Linley (1798–1865)
- George Linstead (1908–1974)
- Guy de Lioncourt (1885–1961)
- Karol Lipiński (1790–1861)
- Malcolm Lipkin (born 1932)
- Marijan Lipovšek (1910–1995)
- Vatroslav Lisinski (1819–1854)
- Claude Joseph Rouget de Lisle (1760–1836)
- Franz Liszt (1811–1886)
- Gaston Litaize (1909–1991)
- Antonio de Literes (1673–1747)
- Henry Charles Litolff (1818–1891)
- Giulio Litta (1822–1891)
- Ricardo Llorca (born 1962)
- George Lloyd (1913–1998)
- Andrew Lloyd Webber (born 1948)
- William Lloyd Webber (1914–1982)
- Johann Christian Lobe (1797–1881)
- Alonso Lobo (1555–1617)
- Duarte Lobo (c. 1565 – 1646)
- Elias Álvares Lôbo (1834–1901)
- Pietro Locatelli (1695–1764)
- Matthew Locke (c. 1621 – 1677)
- Dan Locklair (born 1949)
- Normand Lockwood (1906–2002)
- Edward Loder (1813–1865)
- George Loder (1816–1868)
- Charles Martin Loeffler (1861–1935)
- Jacques Loeillet (1685–1748)
- Jean-Baptiste Loeillet de Ghent (1688 – c. 1720)
- Jean-Baptiste Loeillet of London (1680–1730)
- Frank Loesser (1910–1969)
- Theo Loevendie (born 1930)
- Carl Loewe (1796–1869)
- Nicola Bonifacio Logroscino (1698 – c. 1764)
- Martin Lohse (born 1971)
- Otto Lohse (1858–1925)
- Hannibal Lokumbe (Marvin Peterson) (born 1948)
- Antonio Lolli (1725–1802)
- Ruth Lomon (1930–2017)
- Alessandro Longo (1864–1945)
- Paolo Longo (born 1967)
- Antoine de Longueval (fl. 1498–1525)
- Harvey Worthington Loomis (1865–1930)
- Fernando Lopes-Graça (1906–1994)
- Francisco Lopez Capillas (c. 1615 – 1673)
- Esteban López Morago (c. 1575 – after 1630)
- Jimmy Lopez (born 1978)
- Richard Loqueville (fl. from 1410; died 1418)
- Bent Lorentzen (1935–2018)
- Paolo Lorenzani (1640–1713)
- Oscar Lorenzo Fernândez (1897–1948)
- Albert Lortzing (1801–1851)
- Francisco Losada (1612–1667)
- Johann Anton Losy (Logy) (c. 1650 – 1721)
- Mark Lothar (1902–1985)
- Antonio Lotti (c. 1667 – 1740)
- Ivana Loudová (1941–2017)
- Alexina Louie (born 1949)
- Arthur Lourié (1892–1966)
- Samuel Lover (1797–1868)
- Paul Lovatt-Cooper (born 1976)
- Adriano Lualdi (1885–1971)
- Bertram Luard-Selby (1853–1918)
- Vincent Lübeck (1654–1740)
- Charles Lucas (1808–1869)
- Clarence Lucas (1866–1947)
- Leighton Lucas (1903–1982)
- Arjen Anthony Lucassen (born 1960)
- Andrea Luchesi (1741–1801)
- Alvin Lucier (1931–2021)
- Arno Lücker (born 1979)
- Nicholas Ludford (c. 1490 – 1557)
- Otto Luening (1900–1996)
- Alexandre Luigini (1850–1906)
- Ivan Lukačić (c. 1587 – 1648)
- Zdeněk Lukáš (1928–2007)
- Giovanni Lorenzo Lulier (1662–1700)
- Jean-Baptiste Lully (1632–1687)
- Jean-Louis Lully (1667–1688)
- Louis Lully (1664–1734)
- Hans Christian Lumbye (1810–1874)
- Johannes Lupi (c. 1506 – 1539)
- Ambrose Lupo (fl. from 1539; died 1591)
- Thomas Lupo (1571–1627)
- Filippo de Lurano (c. 1470 – after 1520)
- Vicente Lusitano (fl. c. 1551–1561)
- Witold Lutosławski (1913–1994)
- Elisabeth Lutyens (1906–1983)
- Wilhelm Meyer Lutz (1829–1903)
- Arkady Luxemburg (born 1939)
- Carolus Luython (1557–1620)
- Luzzasco Luzzaschi (1545?–1607)
- Alexei Fyodorovich Lvov (1798–1870)
- Anatoly Lyadov (1855–1914)
- Sergei Lyapunov (1859–1924)
- Boris Lyatoshinsky (1895–1968)
- Ralph Lyford (1882–1927)
- James Lyon (composer) (1735–1794)
- James Lyon (British composer) (1872–1942)
- Mykola Vitaliiovych Lysenko (1842–1912)
- Stanyslav Lyudkevych (1879–1979)

== M ==
- Ma Sicong (1912–1987)
- Lorin Maazel (1930–2014)
- Teodulo Mabellini (1817–1897)
- Hamish MacCunn (1868–1916)
- Edward MacDowell (1860–1908)
- José Maceda (1917–2004)
- Teo Macero (1925–2008)
- George Alexander Macfarren (1813–1887)
- Walter Cecil Macfarren (1826–1905)
- Manuel Machado (c. 1590 – 1646)
- Sergio Machado (born 1963)
- Peter Machajdik (born 1961)
- Guillaume de Machaut (c. 1300–1377)
- François-Bernard Mâche (born 1935)
- Le Sieur de Machy (died after 1692)
- Alexander Mackenzie (1847–1935)
- John Mackey (born 1973)
- Steven Mackey (born 1956)
- Kevin MacLeod (born 1972)
- James MacMillan (born 1959)
- Elizabeth Maconchy (1907–1994)
- Robin Maconie (born 1942)
- Giovanni de Macque (c. 1549 – 1614)
- Bruno Maderna (1920–1973)
- Leevi Madetoja (1887–1947)
- Filipe da Madre de Deus (c. 1630 – c. 1688 or later)
- Jef Maes (1905–1996)
- Filipe de Magalhães (c. 1571 – 1652)
- Frederik Magle (born 1977)
- Albéric Magnard (1865–1914)
- Victor Magnien (1802–1885)
- Désiré Magnus (1828–1884)
- Janet Maguire (1927–2019)
- Ernst Mahle (1929–2025)
- Gustav Mahler (1860–1911)
- Mesías Maiguashca (born 1938)
- Jean Maillard (c. 1515?–c. 1570)
- Aimé Maillart (1817–1871)
- Martin Mailman (1932–2000)
- Giorgio Mainerio (c. 1535 – 1582)
- Philipp Maintz (born 1977)
- Gian Francesco de Majo (1732–1770)
- Giuseppe de Majo (1697–1771)
- Kiril Makedonski (1925–1984)
- Andreas Makris (1930–2005)
- Malcourt (fl. c. 1470–1480)
- Pierre van Maldere (1729–1768)
- Paul de Maleingreau (1887–1956)
- Dmitry Malikov (born 1970)
- Gian Francesco Malipiero (1882–1973)
- Riccardo Malipiero (1914–2003)
- Otto Malling (1848–1915)
- Gui Mallon (born 1953)
- Pierre de Manchicourt (c. 1510 – 1564)
- Francesco Mancini (1672–1737)
- Henry Mancini (1924–1994)
- Josip Mandić (1883–1959)
- Francesco Manelli (1594–1667)
- Francesco Manfredini (1684–1762)
- Franco Mannino (1924–2005)
- Philippe Manoury (born 1952)
- Keith Mansfield (born 1941)
- Tigran Mansurian (born 1939)
- Jaakko Mäntyjärvi (born 1963)
- Paul Manz (1919–2009)
- Marco Marazzoli (c. 1602 – 1662)
- Marin Marais (1656–1728)
- Roland Marais (c. 1685 – c. 1750)
- Alessandro Marcello (1669–1747)
- Benedetto Marcello (1686–1739)
- Andrew March (born 1973)
- Louis Marchand (1669–1732)
- Filippo Marchetti (1831–1902)
- Anthony Marinelli (born 1959)
- Christian Marclay (born 1955)
- Czesław Marek (1891–1985)
- Luca Marenzio (c. 1553 – 1599)
- Franco Margola (1908–1992)
- Maria Antonia Walpurgis of Bavaria (Electress of Saxony) (1724–1780)
- Dario Marianelli (born 1963)
- José Marín (1618–1699)
- Biagio Marini (1594–1663)
- Igor Markevitch (1912–1983)
- Miklós Maros (born 1943)
- Arturo Márquez (born 1950)
- Heinrich Marschner (1795–1861)
- John Marsh (1752–1828)
- Henri Marteau (1874–1934)
- François Martin (1727–1757)
- Frank Martin (1890–1974)
- Philip Martin (born 1947)
- Vicente Martin y Soler (1754–1806)
- Marianna von Martines (1744–1812)
- Giovanni Battista Martini (Padre Martini) (1706–1784)
- Jean Paul Egide Martini (1741–1816)
- Johannes Martini (c. 1430/1440–1497)
- Donald Martino (1931–2005)
- Bohuslav Martinů (1890–1959)
- Steve Martland (1959–2013)
- Giuseppe Martucci (1856–1909)
- Vladimir Martynov (born 1946)
- Joseph Marx (1882–1964)
- Karl Marx (1897–1985)
- Eduard Marxsen (1806–1887)
- Pietro Mascagni (1863–1945)
- David Maslanka (1943–2017)
- Daniel Gregory Mason (1873–1953)
- William Mason (1829–1908)
- Paola Massarenghi (born 1565; fl. 1585)
- Jean-Baptiste Masse (c. 1700 – c. 1757)
- Victor Massé (1822–1884)
- Jules Massenet (1842–1912)
- Gérard Masson (born 1936)
- Lovro von Matačić (1899–1985)
- Johannes Matelart (Ioanne Matelart) (before 1538–1607)
- William Mathias (1934–1992)
- André Mathieu (1929–1968)
- Yoritsune Matsudaira (1907–2001)
- Teizo Matsumura (1929–2007)
- Nicola Matteis (fl. c. 1670–1698; d. after 1713)
- Matteo da Perugia (fl. 1400–1416)
- Tobias Matthay (1858–1945)
- Johann Mattheson (1681–1764)
- Colin Matthews (born 1946)
- Siegfried Matthus (1934–2021)
- Peter Matz (1928–2002)
- Rudolf Mauersberger (1889–1971)
- John Henry Maunder (1858–1920)
- Nicholas Maw (1935–2009)
- Colin Mawby (1936–2019)
- Frederick May (1911–1985)
- Charles Mayer (1799–1862)
- Emilie Mayer (1812–1883)
- John Maynard (c. 1577 – c. 1633)
- Ascanio Mayone (1565–1627)
- Rupert Ignaz Mayr (1646–1712)
- Johann Simon Mayr (1763–1845)
- Toshiro Mayuzumi (1929–1997)
- Jacques Féréol Mazas (1782–1849)
- Domenico Mazzocchi (1592–1665)
- Virgilio Mazzocchi (1597–1646)
- Giovanni Mazzuoli (Giovanni degli Organi) (c. 1360 – 1426)
- John McCabe (1939–2015)
- Paul McCartney (born 1942)
- Cecilia McDowall (born 1951)
- John Blackwood McEwen (1868–1948)
- Peter McGarr (born 1953)
- Michael McGlynn (born 1964)
- John McGuire (born 1942)
- Rod McKuen (1933–2015)
- John McLachlan (born 1964)
- Paul McSwiney (1856–1890)
- Richard Meale (1932–2009)
- Kirke Mechem (born 1925)
- Tilo Medek (1940–2006)
- Johann Valentin Meder (1649–1719)
- Nikolai Medtner (1880–1951)
- Peter Meechan (composer) (born 1980)
- Étienne Méhul (1763–1817)
- Johan de Meij (born 1953)
- Alessandro Melani (1639–1703)
- Jacopo Melani (1623–1676)
- Erkki Melartin (1875–1937)
- Diogo Dias Melgás (1638–1700)
- Felix Mendelssohn (1809–1847)
- Manuel Mendes (c. 1547 – 1605)
- Rosendo Mendizábal (1868–1913)
- Martin-Joseph Mengal (1784–1851)
- Alan Menken (born 1949)
- Peter Mennin (1923–1983)
- Gian Carlo Menotti (1911–2007)
- Wolfram Menschick (1937–2010)
- Sophie Menter (1846–1918)
- John Merbecke (c. 1505 – c. 1585)
- Saverio Mercadante (1795–1870)
- Amédée Méreaux (1802–1874)
- Nicolas-Jean Lefroid de Méreaux (1745–1797)
- Aarre Merikanto (1893–1958)
- Oskar Merikanto (1868–1924)
- Gustav Merkel (1827–1885)
- Maceo Merriweather (1905–1953)
- Wim Mertens (born 1953)
- Johann Kaspar Mertz (1806–1856)
- Tarquinio Merula (1594/1595–1665)
- Claudio Merulo (1533–1604)
- René Mesangeau (fl. 1567–1638)
- Vyacheslav Mescherin (1923–1995)
- André Messager (1853–1929)
- Guilielmus Messaus (1589–1640)
- Olivier Messiaen (1908–1992)
- Ludwig Mestler (1891–1959)
- Josep Mestres Quadreny (1929–2021)
- Edgar Meyer (born 1960)
- Ernst Hermann Meyer (1905–1988)
- Giacomo Meyerbeer (1791–1864)
- Adam Václav Michna z Otradovic (c. 1600 – 1676)
- Richard Mico (1590–1661)
- Wilhelm Middelschulte (1863–1943)
- Marcin Mielczewski (c. 1600 – 1651)
- Oreste Migliaccio (1882–1973)
- Francisco Mignone (1897–1986)
- Marcel Mihalovici (1898–1985)
- Minoru Miki (1930–2011)
- Mikołaj z Krakowa (Nicolaus Cracoviensis) (first half of 16th century)
- Luis de Milán (c. 1500 – after 1560)
- Francesco da Milano (1497–1543)
- Carlo Milanuzzi (c. 1590 – c. 1647)
- Robin Milford (1903–1959)
- Darius Milhaud (1892–1974)
- Glenn Miller (1904–1944)
- Carl Millöcker (1842–1899)
- Nicolas Millot (fl. 1559–1589)
- Richard Mills (born 1949)
- Leon Milo (1956–2014)
- Georgi Minchev (born 1939)
- Charles Mingus (1922–1979)
- Ludwig Minkus (1826–1917)
- Ambrogio Minoja (1752–1825)
- Guillaume Minoret (c. 1650 – 1717/1720)
- Lin-Manuel Miranda (born 1980)
- Franciszek Mirecki (1791–1862)
- Arif Mirzayev (1944–2026)
- Dimitri Mitropoulos (1896–1960)
- Dary John Mizelle (born 1940)
- Hajime Mizoguchi (born 1960)
- Eric Moe (born 1954)
- Ernest John Moeran (1894–1950)
- Stevan Stojanović Mokranjac (1856–1914)
- Bernhard Molique (1802–1869)
- Simone Molinaro (c. 1570 – after 1633)
- P. des Molins (fl. mid 14th century)
- Simon Molitor (1766–1848)
- John Christopher Moller (1755–1803)
- James Lynam Molloy (1837–1909)
- Johann Melchior Molter (1696–1765)
- Jérôme-Joseph de Momigny (1762–1842)
- Fred Momotenko (born 1970)
- Federico Mompou (1893–1987)
- David Monacchi (born 1970)
- José Pablo Moncayo (1912–1958)
- Jean-Joseph Cassanéa de Mondonville (1711–1772)
- Stanisław Moniuszko (1819–1872)
- Meredith Monk (born 1942)
- Thelonious Monk (1917–1982)
- Georg Matthias Monn (1717–1750)
- Hippolyte Monpou (1804–1841)
- Pierre-Alexandre Monsigny (1729–1817)
- Ricardo Montaner (born 1957)
- Philippe de Monte (1521–1603)
- Michel Pignolet de Montéclair (1667–1737)
- Italo Montemezzi (1875–1952)
- José Ángel Montero (1832–1881)
- Claudio Monteverdi (1567–1643)
- Giulio Cesare Monteverdi (1573–1630/31)
- Vittorio Monti (1868–1922)
- Xavier Montsalvatge (1912–2002)
- Douglas Moore (1893–1969)
- Dudley Moore (1935–2002)
- Philip Moore (born 1943)
- Cristóbal de Morales (c. 1500 – 1553)
- Peter K. Moran (1767–1831)
- Robert Moran (born 1937)
- Paul Moravec (born 1957)
- Jean-Baptiste Moreau (1656–1733)
- Henri Moreau (1728–1803)
- Justin Morgan (1747–1798)
- Franz Anton Morgenroth (1780–1847)
- Jean-Baptiste Morin (1677–1745)
- Francesco Morlacchi (1784–1841)
- Thomas Morley (1557/1558–1602)
- Giorgio Moroder (born 1940)
- Jerome Moross (1913–1983)
- Steve Morse (born 1954)
- Ennio Morricone (1928–2020)
- Harry Mortimer (1902–1992)
- Jelly Roll Morton (1890–1941)
- Robert Morton (c. 1430 – 1479)
- Ignaz Moscheles (1794–1870)
- Alexander Mosolov (1900–1973)
- Mihály Mosonyi (1815–1870)
- Moritz Moszkowski (1854–1925)
- Diether de la Motte (1928–2010)
- Felix Mottl (1856–1911)
- Pierre Moulu (c. 1484 – c. 1550)
- Jean-Joseph Mouret (1682–1738)
- Georges Moustaki (1934–2013)
- Charles Mouton (1626–1710)
- Jean Mouton (Jehan de Hollingue) (c. 1459 – 1522)
- Jean-Baptiste Moyne (1751–1796)
- Alexander Moyzes (1906–1984)
- Franz Xaver Mozart (1791–1844)
- Leopold Mozart (1719–1787)
- Wolfgang Amadeus Mozart (1756–1791)
- Marjan Mozetich (Born 1948)
- Robert Muczynski (1929–2010)
- Alonso Mudarra (c. 1510 – 1580)
- Thomas Molleson Mudie (1809–1876)
- Georg Muffat (1653–1704)
- Gottlieb Muffat (1690–1770)
- Nico Muhly (born 1981)
- Dominic Muldowney (born 1952)
- Adolf Müller Sr. (1801–1886)
- August Eberhard Müller (1767–1817)
- Wenzel Müller (1767–1835)
- Jan Müller-Wieland (born 1966)
- Rexho Mulliqi (1923–1982)
- Gráinne Mulvey (born 1966)
- John Mundy (c. 1555 – 1630)
- William Mundy (c. 1528 – c. 1591)
- Tristan Murail (born 1947)
- Santiago de Murcia (1673–1739)
- Gilles Mureau (Mureue) (c. 1450 – 1512)
- Franz Xaver Murschhauser (1663–1738)
- Thea Musgrave (born 1928)
- Modest Mussorgsky (1839–1881)
- Johann Gottfried Müthel (1728–1788)
- Gordon Mumma (born 1935)
- Ian Munro (born 1963)
- Nikolai Myaskovsky (1881–1950)
- Stanley Myers (1930–1993)
- Josef Mysliveček (1737–1781)

== N ==
- François Joseph Naderman (1781–1835)
- Conlon Nancarrow (1912–1997)
- Giovanni Bernardino Nanino (c. 1560 – 1623)
- Eduard Nápravník (1839–1916)
- Pietro Nardini (1722–1793)
- Peter Nardone (born 1965)
- James Nares (1715–1783)
- Pascual Marquina Narro (1873–1948)
- Luis de Narváez (fl. 1526–1549)
- Ugo Nastrucci (born 1953)
- Isaac Nathan (c. 1792 – 1864)
- Jacques-Christophe Naudot (c. 1690 – 1762)
- Jérôme Naulais (born 1951)
- Johann Gottlieb Naumann (1741–1801)
- Juan Francisco de Navas (c. 1650 – 1719)
- Lior Navok (born 1971)
- Ernesto Nazareth (1863–1934)
- Charles Neate (1784–1877)
- Ivan Nebesnyy (born 1971)
- José de Nebra (1702–1768)
- Oskar Nedbal (1874–1930)
- Alicia Adelaide Needham (1863–1945)
- Christian Gottlob Neefe (1748–1798)
- Cesare Negri (c. 1535 – c. 1605)
- Marcantonio Negri (died 1624)
- Havelock Nelson (1917–1996)
- Sidney Nelson (1800–1862)
- Andreas Nemetz (1799–1846)
- Sarah Nemtsov (born 1980)
- Alberto Nepomuceno (1864–1920)
- Franz Xaver Neruda (1843–1915)
- Johann Baptist Georg Neruda (c. 1707 – c. 1780)
- Viktor Nessler (1841–1890)
- Sigismund Neukomm (1778–1858)
- Wilhelm Neuland (1806–1889)
- Georg Neumark (1621–1681)
- Gösta Neuwirth (born 1937)
- Olga Neuwirth (born 1968)
- William Newark (c. 1450 – 1509)
- Alfred Newman (1900–1970)
- Chris Newman (born 1958)
- David Newman (born 1954)
- Randy Newman (born 1943)
- Thomas Newman (born 1955)
- Phill Niblock (1933–2024)
- Ailís Ní Ríain (born 1974)
- Christoph Nichelmann (1717–1762)
- Sydney Nicholson (1875–1947)
- Edmund Nick (1891–1973)
- Otto Nicolai (1810–1849)
- Louis Niedermeyer (1802–1861)
- Carl Nielsen (1865–1931)
- Ludolf Nielsen (1876–1939)
- Tage Nielsen (1929–2003)
- Joy Nilo (born 1970)
- Anders Nilsson (born 1954)
- Alessandro Nini (1805–1880)
- Ninot le Petit (fl. c. 1500–1520)
- Tomohito Nishiura (born 1973)
- Guillaume-Gabriel Nivers (1632–1714)
- Thomas Tertius Noble (1867–1953)
- Yuji Nomi (born 1958)
- Luigi Nono (1924–1990)
- Anthoni van Noordt (c. 1619 – 1675)
- Erik Norby (1936–2007)
- Arne Nordheim (1931–2010)
- Rikard Nordraak (1842–1866)
- Per Nørgård (1932–2025)
- Ib Nørholm (1931–2019)
- Andrew Norman (born 1979)
- Ludvig Norman (1831–1885)
- Thomas Norris (1741–1790)
- Serge Noskov (born 1956)
- Notker the Stammerer(c. 840–912)
- Vítězslav Novák (1870–1949)
- Ivor Novello (1893–1951)
- Vincent Novello (1781–1861)
- Franz Nikolaus Novotny (1743–1773)
- Johannes Nucius (c. 1556 – 1620)
- Francisco Núñez (born 1965)
- Patrick Nunn (born 1969)
- Johann Abraham Nüske (1796–1865)
- Ervin Nyiregyházi (1903–1987)
- Michael Nyman (born 1944)
- Knut Nystedt (1915–2014)
- Gösta Nystroem (1890–1966)

== O ==
- Charles Oberthür (1819–1895)
- Jacob Obrecht (c. 1457/1458–1505)
- Vincent O'Brien (1878–1948)
- Johannes Ockeghem (c. 1410/1425–1497)
- Martin O'Donnell (born 1955)
- Robert O'Dwyer (1862–1949)
- Jacques Offenbach (1819–1880)
- Will Ogdon (1921–2013)
- Tale Ognenovski (1922–2012)
- Maurice Ohana (1913–1992)
- Kane O'Hara (c. 1711 – 1782)
- Hisato Ohzawa (1907–1953)
- George O'Kelly (1831–1914)
- Joseph O'Kelly (1828–1885)
- Mike Oldfield (born 1953)
- Arthur Oldham (1926–2003)
- Arthur O'Leary (1834–1919)
- Jane O'Leary (born 1946)
- Carolina Oliphant (1766–1845)
- Stephen Oliver (1950–1992)
- Pauline Oliveros (1932–2016)
- María Teresa Oller (1920–2018)
- Max d'Ollone (1875–1959)
- Otto Olsson (1879–1964)
- George Onslow (1784–1853)
- Cornélie van Oosterzee (1863–1943)
- Chris Opperman (born 1978)
- Mathilda d'Orozco (1796–1863)
- Julián Orbón (1925–1991)
- Karl von Ordoñez (1734–1786)
- Cecilie Ore (born 1954)
- Tarik O'Regan (born 1978)
- Ignatius de Orellana (1860–1931)
- Carl Orff (1895–1982)
- Seán Ó Riada (1931–1971)
- Giuseppe Maria Orlandini (1676–1760)
- Leo Ornstein (1893–2002)
- Aniceto Ortega (1825–1875)
- Léon Orthel (1905–1985)
- Gabriela Ortiz Torres (born 1964)
- Marbrianus de Orto (c. 1460 – 1529)
- Riz Ortolani (1931–2014)
- George Alexander Osborne (1806–1893)
- Alex Otterlei (born 1968)
- Georg Österreich (1664–1735)
- Willy Ostijn (1913–1993)
- Henrique Oswald (1852–1931)
- James Oswald (1711–1769)
- Hans Otte (1926–2007)
- Willem van Otterloo (1907–1978)
- Otto (fl. 18th century)
- Cristóbal Oudrid (1825–1877)
- Frederick Ouseley (1825–1889)
- Morfydd Owen (1891–1918)
- Frank Owens (1933–2023)
- Etienne Ozi (1754–1813)

== P ==
- Luis de Pablo (1930–2021)
- Charles Theodore Pachelbel (1690–1750)
- Johann Pachelbel (1653–1706)
- Wilhelm Hieronymus Pachelbel (c. 1685 – 1764)
- Giovanni Pacini (1796–1867)
- Fredrik Pacius (1809–1891)
- Cornelis Thymenszoon Padbrué (c. 1592 – 1670)
- Martijn Padding (born 1956)
- Else Marie Pade (1924–2016)
- Steen Pade (born 1956)
- Ignacy Jan Paderewski (1860–1941)
- Juan Gutiérrez de Padilla (c. 1590 – 1664)
- Ferdinando Paer (1771–1839)
- Niccolò Paganini (1782–1840)
- John Knowles Paine (1839–1906)
- James Paisible (Jacques Paisible) (c. 1656 – 1721)
- Giovanni Paisiello (1740–1816)
- Eudenice V. Palaruan (born 1968)
- Antonio Palella (1692–1761)
- Charlemagne Palestine (born c. 1947)
- Giovanni Pierluigi da Palestrina (c. 1525 – 1594)
- Zakaria Paliashvili (1871–1933)
- Benedetto Pallavicino (c. 1551 – 1601)
- Carlo Pallavicino (c. 1630 – 1688)
- Jan Gerard Palm (1831–1906)
- Rudolph Palm (1880–1950)
- John Palm (1885–1925)
- Jacobo Palm (1887–1982)
- Geoffrey Molyneux Palmer (1882–1957)
- Selim Palmgren (1878–1951)
- Matteo Palotta (c. 1688 – 1758)
- Leonhard Päminger (1495–1567)
- Giovanni Antonio Pandolfi Mealli (1624–1687)
- Roxanna Panufnik (born 1968)
- Jorma Panula (born 1930)
- Evangelos Odysseas Papathanassiou (Vangelis) (1943–2022)
- Gérard Pape (born 1955)
- Salvatore Pappalardo (1817–1884)
- Désiré Pâque (1867–1939)
- Domenico Paradies (Paradisi) (1707–1791)
- Maria Theresa von Paradis (1759–1824)
- Paul Paray (1886–1979)
- Claudio Pari (1574 – after 1619)
- Maria Hester Park (1775–1822)
- Horatio William Parker (1863–1919)
- Charles Hubert Hastings Parry (1848–1918)
- Michael Parsons (born 1938)
- Robert Parsons (c. 1535 – 1572)
- Arvo Pärt (born 1935)
- Harry Partch (1901–1974)
- Thomas Pasatieri (born 1945)
- Vasily Pashkevich (1742–1797)
- Marc'Antonio Pasqualini (1614–1691)
- Bernardo Pasquini (1637–1710)
- Pierre Passereau (fl. 1509–1547)
- Georg Pasterwitz (1730–1803)
- Robert Paterson (born 1970)
- Carlos Patiño (1600–1675)
- Annie Patterson (1868–1934)
- Paul Patterson (born 1947)
- Paul I Esterházy of Galántha (1635–1713)
- Jiří Pauer (1919–2007)
- Stephen Paulus (1949–2014)
- Conrad Paumann (c. 1410 – 1473)
- Alla Pavlova (born 1952)
- Anthony Payne (1936–2021)
- Juan Carlos Paz (1901–1972)
- Robert Lucas de Pearsall (1795–1856)
- Johnny Pearson (1925–2011)
- Mogens Pedersøn (c. 1583 – 1623)
- Carlo Pedini (born 1956)
- Carlos Pedrell (1878–1941)
- Felip Pedrell (1841–1922)
- Teodorico Pedrini (1671–1746)
- Carlo Pedrotti (1817–1893)
- Martin Peerson (1571/1573–1651)
- Flor Peeters (1903–1986)
- Dora Pejačević (1885–1923)
- Bartłomiej Pękiel (died c. 1670)
- Georgs Pelēcis (born 1947)
- Josef Pembaur (1848–1923)
- Jorge Peña Hen (1928–1973)
- Francisco de Peñalosa (c. 1470 – 1528)
- James Penberthy (1917–1999)
- Krzysztof Penderecki (1933–2020)
- Tomaž Pengov (1949–2014)
- Kevin Penkin (born 1992)
- David Pentecost (born 1940)
- Ernst Pepping (1901–1981)
- Johann Christoph Pepusch (1667–1752)
- Davide Perez (1711–1778)
- Juan Pérez de Gijón (fl. c. 1460–1500)
- Giovanni Battista Pergolesi (1710–1736)
- Jacopo Peri (1561–1633)
- Carlo Perinello (1877–1942)
- Scott Perkins (born 1980)
- George Perle (1915–2009)
- François-Louis Perne (1772–1832)
- Lorenzo Perosi (1872–1956)
- Pérotin (fl. 1190–1220)
- George Perry (1793–1862)
- William P. Perry (born 1930)
- Giuseppe Persiani (1799–1869)
- Vincent Persichetti (1915–1987)
- Giacomo Antonio Perti (1661–1756)
- Giovanni Battista Pescetti (c. 1704 – c. 1766)
- Michele Pesenti (c. 1470 – after 1524)
- Oto Pestner (born 1956)
- Emile Pessard (1843–1917)
- Johann Friedrich Peter (1746–1813)
- Norbert Walter Peters (born 1954)
- David Petersen (c. 1651 – 1737)
- Wilhelm Petersen (1890–1957)
- Wilhelm Peterson-Berger (1867–1942)
- Goffredo Petrassi (1904–2003)
- Errico Petrella (1813–1877)
- Albena Petrovic-Vratchanska (born 1965)
- Allan Pettersson (1911–1980)
- Christian Petzold (1677–1733)
- Paul Peuerl (1570–1625)
- Andreas Pevernage (1542/1543–1591)
- Johann Christoph Pez (1664–1716)
- Johann Christoph Pezel (1639–1694)
- Georges Pfeiffer (1835–1908)
- Augustin Pfleger (1635–1686)
- Hans Pfitzner (1869–1949)
- Ferdinand Pfohl (1862–1949)
- P. Q. Phan (born 1962)
- Barrington Pheloung (1954–2019)
- Anne Danican Philidor (1681–1728)
- François-André Danican Philidor (1726–1795)
- Philippe le Chancelier (c. 1160/1170–1236)
- Michel Philippot (1925–1996)
- Art Phillips (born 1955)
- Peter Philips (c. 1560 – 1628)
- Dominique Phinot (c. 1510 – c. 1556)
- Carlo Alfredo Piatti (1822–1901)
- Ástor Piazzolla (1921–1992)
- Giovanni Picchi (1571/1572–1643)
- Alessandro Piccinini (1566–1638)
- Niccolò Piccinni (1728–1800)
- Václav Pichl (1741–1804)
- John Pickard (born 1963)
- Tobias Picker (born 1954)
- Johann Gottfried Piefke (1815–1884)
- Gabriel Pierné (1863–1937)
- Maestro Piero (before 1300–c. 1350)
- Willem Pijper (1894–1947)
- Auguste Pilati (1810–1877)
- Mario Pilati (1903–1938)
- Francis Pilkington (c. 1565 – 1638)
- Daniel Pinkham (1923–2006)
- Maria Teresa Agnesi Pinottini (1720–1795)
- George Pinto (1785–1806)
- Matthias Pintscher (born 1971)
- Nicola Piovani (born 1946)
- Matthaeus Pipelare (c. 1450 – c. 1515)
- Bernardo Pisano (1490–1548)
- Johann Georg Pisendel (1687–1755)
- Francesco Antonio Pistocchi (1659–1726)
- Walter Piston (1894–1976)
- Thomas Pitfield (1903–1999)
- Giuseppe Ottavio Pitoni (1657–1743)
- Johann Peter Pixis (1788–1874)
- Ildebrando Pizzetti (1880–1968)
- Joan Baptista Pla (c. 1720 – 1773)
- Robert Planquette (1848–1903)
- Peter Planyavsky (born 1947)
- Pietro Platania (1828–1907)
- Giovanni Benedetto Platti (1697–1763)
- Ignaz Pleyel (1757–1831)
- John Plummer (c. 1410 – c. 1484)
- Ludvík Podéšť (Binovský) (1921–1968)
- Alessandro Poglietti (early 17th century–1683)
- David Pohle (1624–1695)
- František Xaver Pokorný (1729–1794)
- Madame Poldowski (Régine Wieniawski, Irène Wieniawska) (1879–1932)
- Carlo Francesco Pollarolo (c. 1653 – 1723)
- Giovanni Battista Polledro (1781–1853)
- Ignazio Pollice (fl. 1684–1705)
- Francesco Pollini (1762–1846)
- Doc Pomus (1925–1991)
- Manuel Ponce (1882–1948)
- Amilcare Ponchielli (1834–1886)
- Marcel Poot (1901–1988)
- Enno Poppe (born 1969)
- David Popper (1843–1913)
- Nicola Porpora (1686–1768)
- Costanzo Porta (c. 1529 – 1601)
- Giovanni Porta (c. 1675 – 1755)
- Cole Porter (1891–1964)
- Quincy Porter (1897–1966)
- Rachel Portman (born 1960)
- Marcos Portugal (1762–1830)
- Isaac Posch (1591?–c. 1623)
- Edouard Potjes (1860–1931)
- A. J. Potter (1918–1980)
- Cipriani Potter (1792–1871)
- Francis Poulenc (1899–1963)
- Henri Pousseur (1929–2009)
- Jonathan Powell (1969–2025)
- Mel Powell (1923–1998)
- Leonel Power (c. 1370/1385?–1445)
- Gerhard Präsent (born 1957)
- Ferdinand Praeger (1815–1891)
- Hieronymus Praetorius (1560–1629)
- Jacob Praetorius (1586–1651)
- Michael Praetorius (1571–1621)
- Stephen Pratt (born 1947)
- Luca Antonio Predieri (1688–1767)
- Zbigniew Preisner (born 1955)
- Thomas Preston (died after 1559)
- André Previn (1929–2019)
- Florence Beatrice Price (1887–1953)
- Maui Dalvanius Prime (1948–2002)
- Alfred Prinz (1930–2014)
- Johannes Prioris (c. 1460?–c. 1514)
- Deborah Pritchard (born 1977)
- Gene Pritsker (born 1971)
- Giovanni Priuli (c. 1575 – 1626)
- Friederike Proch Benesch (1805–1872)
- Simon Proctor (born 1959)
- Sergei Prokofiev (1891–1953)
- Frank Proto (born 1941)
- Francesco Provenzale (1624–1704)
- John Psathas (born 1966)
- Giacomo Puccini (1858–1924)
- Gaetano Pugnani (1731–1798)
- Cesare Pugni (1802–1870)
- Raoul Pugno (1852–1914)
- Puẖiya (Puẖiyana) (c. 1400 BC)
- Joan Pau Pujol (1570–1626)
- Johannes Pullois (fl. from 1443; died 1478)
- Giovanni Punto (Jan Václav Stich) (1746–1803)
- Daniel Purcell (1664–1717)
- Henry Purcell (1659–1695)
- Kevin Puts (born 1972)
- Veli-Matti Puumala (born 1965)
- Pycard (Picart) (fl. c. 1410)

== Q ==
- Qu Xiaosong (born 1952)
- Qu Xixian (1919–2008)
- Johannes de Quadris (c. 1410 – after 1456)
- Paolo Quagliati (c. 1555 – 1628)
- Johann Joachim Quantz (1697–1773)
- Joseph Quesnel (1746–1809)
- Alfred Quidant (1815–1893)
- Roger Quilter (1877–1953)
- Marie-Anne-Catherine Quinault (1695–1791)
- Lucia Quinciani (born c. 1566; fl. 1611)
- Marcel Quinet (1915–1986)
- Daniel Patrick Quinn (born 1981)
- Manuel Quiroga (1892–1961)
- Manuel José de Quirós (c. 1690?–1765)

== R ==
- Dick Raaijmakers (1930–2013)
- Damodar Raao (born 1977)
- François Rabbath (born 1931)
- Henri Rabaud (1873–1949)
- Alexandre Rabinovitch-Barakovsky (born 1945)
- Folke Rabe (1935–2017)
- Peer Raben (1940–2007)
- Sergei Rachmaninoff (1873–1943)
- Charles Racquet (1597–1664)
- Mikołaj Radomski (Nicolaus de Radom) (fl. c. 1400)
- Jean-Théodore Radoux (1835–1911)
- Horațiu Rădulescu (1942–2008)
- Joachim Raff (1822–1882)
- Assi Rahbani (1923–1986)
- Mansour Rahbani (1925–2009)
- Alexander Rahbari (born 1948)
- A. R. Rahman (born 1966)
- Pietro Raimondi (1786–1853)
- Ralph Rainger (1901–1942)
- Tomi Räisänen (born 1976)
- André Raison (1640s–1719)
- Yuvan Shankar Raja (born 1979)
- Thomas Rajna (1928–2021)
- Ľudovít Rajter (Rayter) (1906–2000)
- Jean-Philippe Rameau (1683–1764)
- Ariel Ramírez (1921–2010)
- Mattio Rampollini (1497 – c. 1553)
- Robert Ramsey (1590s–1644)
- Shulamit Ran (born 1949)
- Bernard Rands (born 1934)
- Ture Rangström (1884–1947)
- György Ránki (1907–1992)
- Günter Raphael (1903–1960)
- Andreas Raselius (c. 1563 – 1602)
- Francesco Rasi (1574–1621)
- Karl Aage Rasmussen (born 1947)
- Valentin Rathgeber (1682–1750)
- Hermann Raupach (1728–1778)
- Einojuhani Rautavaara (1928–2016)
- Maurice Ravel (1875–1937)
- Thomas Ravenscroft (c. 1582 – c. 1635)
- Alan Rawsthorne (1905–1971)
- Emma Marcy Raymond (1856–1913)
- Fred Raymond (1900–1954)
- Ray Reach (born 1948)
- François Rebel (1701–1775)
- Jean-Féry Rebel (1666–1747)
- João Lourenço Rebelo (1610–1661)
- John Redford (fl. from 1534; died 1547)
- Hans Redlich (1903–1968)
- Reginald Redman (1892–1972)
- Bernd Redmann (born 1965)
- Thomas German Reed (1817–1888)
- William Reed (1859–1945)
- Emil Reesen (1887–1964)
- Max Reger (1873–1916)
- Johannes Regis (Jehan Leroy) (c. 1425 – c. 1496)
- Jacob Regnart (c. 1540 – 1599)
- Giulio Regondi (1822–1872)
- Karin Rehnqvist (born 1957)
- Steve Reich (born 1936)
- Anton Reicha (1770–1836)
- Josef Reicha (1752–1795)
- Johann Friedrich Reichardt (1752–1814)
- Antonín Reichenauer (c. 1694 – 1730)
- Aribert Reimann (1936–2024)
- Jan Adam Reincken (1643?–1722)
- Alexander Reinagle (1756–1809)
- Carl Reinecke (1824–1910)
- Heinrich Reinhardt (1865–1922)
- Carl Martin Reinthaler (1822–1896)
- Niki Reiser (born 1958)
- Carl Gottlieb Reissiger (1798–1859)
- Sergio Rendine (1954–2023)
- Leon René (1902–1982)
- Dino Residbegovic (born 1975)
- Ottorino Respighi (1879–1936)
- Julius Reubke (1834–1858)
- Peter Reulein (born 1966)
- Ludwig Wilhelm Reuling (1802–1877)
- Esaias Reusner (1636–1679)
- Georg Reutter (1656–1738)
- Georg Reutter (the younger) (1708–1772)
- Hermann Reutter (1900–1985)
- Silvestre Revueltas (1899–1940)
- Cemal Reşit Rey (1904–1985)
- Jean-Baptiste Rey (1734–1810)
- Ernest Reyer (1823–1909)
- Alfred Reynolds (1884–1969)
- Roger Reynolds (born 1934)
- Emil von Reznicek (1860–1945)
- Georg Rhau (Rhaw) (1488–1548)
- Josef Rheinberger (1839–1901)
- Emilios Riadis (1885–1935)
- José María del Carmen Ribas (1796–1861)
- Federico Ricci (1809–1877)
- Luigi Ricci (1805–1859)
- Cesarina Ricci de Tingoli (born c. 1573, fl. 1597)
- Giovanni Battista Riccio (fl. 1609–1621)
- Jean Richafort (c. 1480 – after 1547)
- Ferdinand Tobias Richter (1651–1711)
- Franz Xaver Richter (1709–1789)
- Max Richter (born 1966)
- Frank Ricotti (born 1949)
- Alan Ridout (1934–1996)
- Gottfried Rieger (1764–1855)
- Wallingford Riegger (1885–1961)
- Rolf Riehm (1937–2026)
- Ferdinand Ries (1784–1838)
- Vittorio Rieti (1898–1994)
- Julius Rietz (1812–1877)
- Giovanni Antonio Rigatti (c. 1613 – 1648)
- Henri-Joseph Rigel (1741–1799)
- Vincenzo Righini (1756–1812)
- Wolfgang Rihm (1952–2024)
- Knudåge Riisager (1897–1974)
- Richard Rijnvos (born 1964)
- Terry Riley (born 1935)
- Vincenzo da Rimini (14th century)
- William Rimmer (music) (1862–1936)
- Nikolai Rimsky-Korsakov (1844–1908)
- Christian Heinrich Rinck (1770–1846)
- Diana Ringo (born 1992)
- Philipp Jakob Riotte (1776–1856)
- Alberto da Ripa (Albert de Rippe) (c. 1500 – 1551)
- André Ristic (born 1972)
- Giovanni Alberto Ristori (1692–1753)
- August Gottfried Ritter (1811–1885)
- Johnny Rivers (born 1942)
- Jean Rivier (1896–1987)
- Angela Ro Ro (born 1949)
- Curtis Roads (born 1951)
- François Roberday (1624–1680)
- Pierre Robert (c. 1618 – 1699)
- Harry Robertson (1932–1996)
- Leroy Robertson (1896–1971)
- Joseph Robinson (1815–1898)
- Thomas Robinson (c. 1560 – after 1609)
- George Rochberg (1918–2005)
- August Röckel (1814–1876)
- Arturo Rodas (born 1954)
- Pierre Rode (1774–1830)
- Nile Rodgers (born 1952)
- Richard Rodgers (1902–1979)
- Oleksandr Rodin (born 1975)
- Rocco Rodio (c. 1535 – after 1615)
- Joaquín Rodrigo (1901–1999)
- Robert Xavier Rodriguez (born 1946)
- José Rogel (1829–1901)
- Jean Roger-Ducasse (1873–1954)
- Francesco Rognoni Taeggio (second half of the 16th century – after 1626)
- Riccardo Rognoni (Richardo Rogniono) (c. 1550 – before 20 April 1620)
- Philippe Rogier (c. 1561 – 1596)
- Jean Rogister (1879–1964)
- Eduard Rohde (1828–1883)
- Alexis Roland-Manuel (1891–1966)
- Amadeo Roldán (1900–1939)
- James Rolfe (born 1961)
- Alessandro Rolla (1757–1841)
- Antonio Rolla (1798–1837)
- Johan Helmich Roman (1694–1758)
- Antonius Romanus (fl. c. 1414–1432)
- Andreas Romberg (1767–1821)
- Bernhard Romberg (1767–1841)
- Sigmund Romberg (1887–1951)
- Matheo Romero (c. 1575 – 1647)
- Johann Theodor Römhild (Roemhildt) (1684–1756)
- Julius Röntgen (1855–1932)
- William Michael Rooke (1794–1847)
- Joseph Willard Roosevelt (1918–2008)
- Guy Ropartz (1864–1955)
- Cipriano de Rore (c. 1516 – 1565)
- Ned Rorem (1923–2022)
- Juventino Rosas (1868–1894)
- Ney Rosauro (born 1952)
- David Rose (1910–1990)
- Thomas Roseingrave (1688–1766)
- Hilding Rosenberg (1892–1985)
- Jakob Rosenhain (1813–1894)
- Johann Rosenmüller (1619–1684)
- Manuel Rosenthal (1904–2003)
- Antonio Rosetti (Anton Rösler) (c. 1750 – 1792)
- Nikolai Roslavets (1881–1944)
- Arnold Rosner (1945–2013)
- Jerry Ross (1926–1955)
- Philip Rosseter (1567/1568–1623)
- Camilla de Rossi (fl. 1707–1710)
- Giuseppe de Rossi (born mid 17th-century – died c. 1719–1720)
- Giovanni Battista Rossi (fl. 1585 – c. 1628)
- Lauro Rossi (1810–1885)
- Luigi Rossi (c. 1597 – 1653)
- Michelangelo Rossi (c. 1601 – 1656)
- Roger Rossi (born 1940)
- Salamone Rossi (c. 1570 – 1630)
- Gioachino Rossini (1792–1868)
- Nino Rota (1911–1979)
- Johann Christoph Rothe (1653–1700)
- Hans Rott (1858–1884)
- Christopher Rouse (1949–2019)
- Jean-Jacques Rousseau (1712–1778)
- Albert Roussel (1869–1937)
- Giovanni Rovetta (c. 1596 – 1668)
- Francesco Rovigo (1540/1541–1597)
- Edwin Roxburgh (born 1937)
- Pancrace Royer (1705–1755)
- Miklós Rózsa (1907–1995)
- Jacek Różycki (c. 1635 – 1704)
- Edmund Rubbra (1901–1986)
- Anton Rubinstein (1829–1894)
- Nikolai Rubinstein (1835–1881)
- Sharon Ruchman (born 1949)
- Poul Ruders (born 1949)
- Dane Rudhyar (1895–1985)
- Ernst Rudorff (1840–1916)
- Vincenzo Ruffo (c. 1508 – 1587)
- Giovanni Maria Ruggieri (c. 1665 – c. 1725)
- Carl Ruggles (1876–1971)
- Jake Runestad (born 1986)
- Carl Friedrich Rungenhagen (1778–1851)
- Conrad Rupsch (fl. 1520s)
- Claudia Rusca (1593–1676)
- Craig Russell (born 1951)
- Luigi Russolo (1883–1947)
- Friedrich Wilhelm Rust (1739–1796)
- Giacomo Rust (1741–1786)
- Giovanni Marco Rutini (1723–1797)
- John Rutter (born 1945)
- Jakub Jan Ryba (1765–1815)
- Joseph Ryelandt (1870–1965)
- Frederic Rzewski (1938–2021)

== S ==
- Mart Saar (1882–1963)
- Kaija Saariaho (1952–2023)
- Bernardo Sabadini (fl. from 1662; d. 1718)
- Nicola Sabini (c. 1675 – 1705)
- Antonio Sacchini (1730–1786)
- Nicholas Sackman (born 1950)
- Francesco Sacrati (1605–1650)
- Shigeaki Saegusa (born 1942)
- Harald Sigurd Johan Sæverud (1897–1992)
- Jacques de Saint-Luc (1616 – c. 1710)
- Camille Saint-Saëns (1835–1921)
- Monsieur de Sainte-Colombe (c. 1640 – c. 1700)
- Ryuichi Sakamoto (1952–2023)
- Nicola Sala (1713–1801)
- Antonio de Salazar (c. 1650 – 1715)
- Luis H. Salgado (1903–1977)
- Antonio Salieri (1750–1825)
- Aulis Sallinen (born 1935)
- Erkki Salmenhaara (1941–2002)
- Johann Peter Salomon (1745–1815)
- Esa-Pekka Salonen (born 1958)
- Timothy Salter (born 1942)
- Michael Salvatori (born 1954)
- Spyridon Samaras (1861–1917)
- Giovanni Battista Sammartini (c. 1701 – 1775)
- Giuseppe Sammartini (1695–1750)
- Giovanni Felice Sances (c. 1600 – 1679)
- Carlos Sandoval (born 1956)
- Greg Sandow (born 1943)
- Jan Sandström (born 1954)
- Sven-David Sandström (1942–2019)
- Sandrin (Pierre Regnault) (c. 1490 – after 1560)
- Ramon Santos (born 1941)
- Gaspar Sanz (1640–1710)
- Lucio D. San Pedro (1913–2002)
- Claudio Saracini (1586–1630)
- Pablo de Sarasate (1844–1908)
- Malcolm Sargent (1895–1967)
- Vahram Sargsyan (born 1981)
- Domenico Sarro (1679–1744)
- Giuseppe Sarti (1729–1802)
- Antonio Sartorio (1630–1680)
- Erik Satie (1866–1925)
- Somei Satoh (born 1947)
- Emil von Sauer (1862–1942)
- Henri Sauguet (1901–1989)
- Alice Sauvrezis (1866–1946)
- Eugène Sauzay (1809–1901)
- Matthew Savage (born 1992)
- Hiroyuki Sawano (born 1980)
- David Sawer (born 1961)
- Robert Saxton (born 1953)
- Fazıl Say (born 1970)
- Ahmed Adnan Saygun (1907–1991)
- Marco Scacchi (c. 1600 – 1681/1687)
- Alessandro Scarlatti (1660–1725)
- Domenico Scarlatti (1685–1757)
- Francesco Scarlatti (1666 – c. 1741)
- Giuseppe Scarlatti (1718/1723–1777)
- Pietro Filippo Scarlatti (1679–1750)
- Andrea Lorenzo Scartazzini (born 1971)
- Giacinto Scelsi (1905–1988)
- Theodor von Schacht (1748–1823)
- Benedikt Schack (Žák) (1758–1826)
- Pierre Schaeffer (1910–1995)
- R. Murray Schafer (1933–2021)
- Christoph Schaffrath (1709–1763)
- Walter Scharf (1910–2003)
- Philipp Scharwenka (1847–1917)
- Xaver Scharwenka (1850–1924)
- Peter Schat (1935–2003)
- Klaus Schedl (born 1966)
- Johann Adolph Scheibe (1708–1776)
- Heinrich Scheidemann (c. 1595 – 1663)
- Gottfried Scheidt (1593–1661)
- Samuel Scheidt (1587–1654)
- Johann Hermann Schein (1586–1630)
- Johann Schelle (1648–1701)
- Johannes Schenck (1660 – c. 1712)
- Johann Baptist Schenk (1753–1836)
- Heinrich Schenker (1868–1935)
- Martin Scherber (1907–1974)
- Tona Scherchen (born 1938)
- Sebastian Anton Scherer (1631–1712)
- Peter Schickele (1935–2024)
- Lalo Schifrin (1932–2025)
- Melchior Schildt (1592/1593–1667)
- Max von Schillings (1868–1933)
- Poul Christian Schindler (1648–1740)
- Iris ter Schiphorst (born 1956)
- Hans Schläger (1820–1885)
- Arnolt Schlick (c. 1460 – after 1521)
- Louis Schlösser (1800–1886)
- Paul de Schlözer (1841/1842–1898)
- Martin Schlumpf (born 1947)
- Wolfgang Schmeltzl (c. 1505 – 1564)
- Johann Heinrich Schmelzer (c. 1620 – 1680)
- Ludwig Schmidseder (1904–1971)
- Christfried Schmidt (1932–2025)
- Franz Schmidt (1874–1939)
- Irmin Schmidt (born 1937)
- Aloys Schmitt (1788–1866)
- Florent Schmitt (1870–1958)
- Joseph Schmitt (1734–1791)
- Artur Schnabel (1882–1951)
- Dieter Schnebel (1930–2018)
- Alfred Schnittke (1934–1998)
- Franz Xaver Schnyder von Wartensee (1786–1868)
- Johann Schobert (c. 1735?–1767)
- Othmar Schoeck (1886–1957)
- Arnold Schoenberg (1874–1951)
- Bernhard Scholz (1835–1916)
- Philippus Schoendorff (1558–1617)
- Paul Schoenfield (1947–2024)
- Johann Schop (c. 1590 – 1667)
- Claude-Michel Schönberg (born 1944)
- Carl Siegemund Schönebeck (1758–1806 or after)
- Anne van Schothorst (born 1974)
- Franz Schreker (1878–1934)
- Friedrich Schröder (1910–1972)
- Corona Schröter (1751–1802)
- Franz Schubert (1797–1828)
- Erwin Schulhoff (1894–1942)
- Julius Schulhoff (Šulhov) (1825–1898)
- Gunther Schuller (1925–2015)
- Andrew Schultz (born 1969)
- Johannes Schultz (1582–1653)
- Mark Schultz (born 1970)
- Svend Simon Schultz (1913–1998)
- Johann Abraham Peter Schulz (1747–1800)
- Klaus Schulze (1947–2022)
- William Schuman (1910–1992)
- Clara Schumann (1819–1896)
- Robert Schumann (1810–1856)
- Ludwig Schuncke (1810–1834)
- Georg Caspar Schürmann (1672/1673–1751)
- Joseph Schuster (1748–1812)
- Eduard Schütt (1856–1933)
- Heinrich Schütz (1585–1672)
- Joseph Schwantner (born 1943)
- Wolfgang von Schweinitz (born 1953)
- Anton Schweitzer (1735–1787)
- Heinrich Schwemmer (1621–1696)
- Laura Schwendinger (born 1962)
- Kurt Schwertsik (born 1935)
- Salvatore Sciarrino (born 1947)
- Antonio Scontrino (1850–1922)
- Cyril Scott (1879–1970)
- K. Lee Scott (born 1950)
- Raymond Scott (1908–1994)
- Gil Scott-Heron (1949–2011)
- Alexander Scriabin (1872–1915)
- Peter Sculthorpe (1929–2014)
- Amy Scurria (born 1973)
- Humphrey Searle (1915–1982)
- Simon Sechter (1788–1867)
- Sholom Secunda (1894–1974)
- Seedo (Sidow) (c. 1700 – c. 1754)
- Josef Seger (1716–1782)
- Leif Segerstam (1944–2024)
- Fritz Seitz (1848–1918)
- Carlos Seixas (1704–1742)
- Bernhard Sekles (1872–1934)
- Thomas Selle (1599–1663)
- Bartolomé de Selma y Salaverde (c. 1595 – after 1638)
- Sohail Sen (born 1984)
- Jean Baptiste Senaillé (1687–1730)
- Ramon Sender (born 1934)
- Ludwig Senfl (c. 1486 – 1543)
- Jacob Senleches (fl. 1382/1383–1395)
- José Serebrier (born 1938)
- Claudin de Sermisy (c. 1490 – 1562)
- Kazimierz Serocki (1922–1981)
- Alexander Serov (1820–1871)
- José Serrano (1873–1941)
- Paolo Serrao (1830–1907)
- John Serry, Sr. (1915–2003)
- Adrien-François Servais (1807–1866)
- Esteban Servellón (1921–2003)
- Claudia Sessa (c. 1570 – c. 1617/1619)
- Roger Sessions (1896–1985)
- Doc Severinsen (born 1927)
- Ignaz von Seyfried (1776–1841)
- John Laurence Seymour (1893–1986)
- Giovanni Sgambati (1841–1914)
- Vladimir Shainsky (1925–2017)
- Tolib Shakhidi (born 1946)
- Ernest Shand (1868–1924)
- Ravi Shankar (1920–2012)
- Ralph Shapey (1921–2002)
- Alex Shapiro (born 1962)
- Michael Jeffrey Shapiro (born 1951)
- Christopher Shaw (1925–1995)
- Rodion Shchedrin (1932–2025)
- Alexander Shchetynsky (born 1960)
- Allen Shearer (born 1943)
- Vissarion Shebalin (1902–1963)
- Sinyan Shen (1949–2016)
- Richard Shephard (1949–2021)
- Arthur Shepherd (1880–1958)
- John Sheppard (c. 1515 – 1558)
- Charles Shere (1935–2020)
- Bright Sheng (born 1955)
- Gordon Sherwood (1929–2013)
- William Shield (1748–1829)
- Alice Shields (born 1943)
- Seymour Shifrin (1926–1979)
- Clare Shore (born 1954)
- Howard Shore (born 1946)
- Gregory Short (1938–1999)
- Dmitri Shostakovich (1906–1975)
- Hugh Shrapnel (born 1947)
- Alan Shulman (1915–2002)
- Obadiah Shuttleworth (c. 1675?–1734)
- Jean Sibelius (1865–1957)
- Paul Siefert (1586–1666)
- Elie Siegmeister (1909–1991)
- Arlene Sierra (born 1970)
- Roberto Sierra (born 1953)
- Albert Siklós (Schönwald) (1878–1942)
- Sheila Silver (born 1946)
- Faye-Ellen Silverman (born 1947)
- Valentin Silvestrov (born 1937)
- William Simmes (c. 1575 – c. 1625)
- Achille Simonetti (1857–1928)
- Rudolph Simonsen (1889–1947)
- Christopher Simpson (c. 1602/1606–1669)
- Dudley Simpson (1922–2017)
- Robert Simpson (1921–1997)
- Thomas Simpson (1582–1628)
- Ezra Sims (1928–2015)
- Christian Sinding (1856–1941)
- Jean-Baptiste Singelée (1812–1875)
- Alvin Singleton (born 1940)
- Leone Sinigaglia (1868–1944)
- Rakhi Singh (living)
- Giuseppe Sinopoli (1946–2001)
- Nicolas Siret (1663–1754)
- Maddalena Laura Sirmen (1745–1818)
- Larry Sitsky (born 1934)
- Fredrik Sixten (born 1962)
- Todor Skalovski (1909–2004)
- Peter Skellern (1947–2017)
- Howard Skempton (born 1947)
- Matthew Sklar (born 1973)
- František Škroup (1801–1862)
- Jan Nepomuk Škroup (1811–1892)
- Thomas Sleeper (1956–2022)
- Nicolas Slonimsky (1894–1995)
- Haskell Small (born 1948)
- Basil Smallman (1921–2001)
- Antonio Smareglia (1854–1929)
- Bedřich Smetana (1824–1884)
- Dmitri Smirnov (1948–2020)
- Leo Smit (1900–1943)
- Leo Smit (1921–1999)
- Alice Mary Smith (1839–1884)
- Dave Smith (born 1949)
- John Christopher Smith (1712–1795)
- John Stafford Smith (1750–1836)
- Julia Smith (1911–1989)
- Robert W. Smith (1958–2023)
- Sydney Smith (1839–1889)
- William Smith (1603–1645)
- William O. Smith (1926–2020)
- Adi Smolar (born 1959)
- Martin Smolka (born 1959)
- Ethel Smyth (1858–1944)
- Ragnar Søderlind (born 1945)
- August Söderman (1832–1876)
- Charlotte Sohy (1887–1955)
- Nikolay Sokolov (1859–1922)
- Mikhail Sokolovsky (1756 – after 1795)
- Nahre Sol (born 1991)
- Charles Michael Alexis Sola (1786–1857)
- Solage (fl. late 14th century)
- Juan María Solare (born 1966)
- Alessandro Solbiati (born 1956)
- Antonio Soler (1729–1783)
- Temistocle Solera (1815–1878)
- Jean-Pierre Solié (1755–1812)
- Carlo Soliva (1791–1853)
- Giovanni Sollima (born 1962)
- Edward Solomon (1855–1895)
- Harry Somers (1925–1999)
- Arthur Somervell (1863–1937)
- Giovanni Battista Somis (1686–1763)
- S. P. Somtow (Somtow Sucharitkul) (born 1952)
- Stephen Sondheim (1930–2021)
- Fernando Sor (1778–1839)
- Kaikhosru Shapurji Sorabji (1892–1988)
- Francesco Soriano (c. 1548 – 1621)
- Luka Sorkočević (1734–1789)
- Pablo Sorozábal (1897–1988)
- Mauricio Sotelo (born 1961)
- Jeremy Soule (born 1975)
- André Souris (1899–1970)
- John Philip Sousa (1854–1932)
- Leo Sowerby (1895–1968)
- Philip Sparke (born 1951)
- Johannes Spech (c. 1767 – 1836)
- Benjamin Speed (born 1979)
- Alexander Spendiaryan (1871–1928)
- Johannes Matthias Sperger (1750–1812)
- Johann Speth (1664 – after 1719)
- Leo Spies (1899–1965)
- Francesco Spinacino (fl. 1507)
- Georgia Spiropoulos (born 1965)
- Louis Spohr (1784–1859)
- Gaspare Spontini (1774–1851)
- Peter Sprague (born 1955)
- Lewis Spratlan (1940–2023)
- Rudi Spring (1962–2025)
- Richard St. Clair (born 1946)
- Pieter van der Staak (1930–2007)
- Annibale Stabile (c. 1535 – 1595)
- Johann Staden (1581–1634)
- Sigmund Theophil Staden (1607–1655)
- Hans Stadlmair (1929–2019)
- John Stainer (1840–1901)
- Camille-Marie Stamaty (1811–1870)
- Anton Stamitz (1754 – c. 1798/1809)
- Carl Stamitz (1745–1801)
- Johann Stamitz (1717–1757)
- Jack Stamp (born 1954)
- Alexei Stanchinsky (1888–1914)
- Hatto Ständer (1926–2000)
- Patric Standford (1939–2014)
- Charles Villiers Stanford (1852–1924)
- John Stanley (1712–1786)
- George Stansbury (1800–1845)
- Robert Starer (1924–2001)
- Joseph Starzer (c. 1726 – 1787)
- Roman Statkowski (1859–1925)
- Maria Fredrica von Stedingk (1799–1868)
- Christopher Steel (1938–1991)
- Agostino Steffani (1653–1728)
- Walter Steffens (born 1934)
- Daniel Steibelt (1765–1823)
- Johann Ulrich Steigleder (1593–1635)
- Max Steiner (1888–1971)
- Jim Steinman (1947–2021)
- Wilhelm Stenhammar (1871–1927)
- Stephen of Liège (c. 850–920)
- Rudi Stephan (1887–1915)
- George Stephănescu (1843–1925)
- Johann Franz Xaver Sterkel (1750–1817)
- Max Stern (born 1947)
- Daniel Sternefeld (1905–1986)
- Bernard Stevens (1916–1983)
- John Andrew Stevenson (1761–1833)
- Robert Prescott Stewart (1825–1894)
- Ernstalbrecht Stiebler (1934–2024)
- William Grant Still (1895–1978)
- Karlheinz Stockhausen (1928–2007)
- Robert Stoepel (1821–1887)
- Petar Stojanović (1877–1957)
- Zygmunt Stojowski (1870–1946)
- Johannes de Stokem (c. 1445 – 1487)
- Robert Stolz (1880–1975)
- Thomas Stoltzer (c. 1480 – 1526)
- Kurt-Heinz Stolze (1926–1970)
- Gottfried Heinrich Stölzel (1690–1749)
- Ingrid Stölzel (born 1971)
- Nathaniel Stookey (born 1970)
- Bernardo Storace (fl. 1664)
- Stephen Storace (1762–1796)
- Herbert Stothart (1885–1949)
- Alessandro Stradella (1639–1682)
- Robert Strassburg (1915–2003)
- Georg Christoph Strattner (c. 1644 – 1704)
- Christoph Straus (1575–1631)
- Eduard Strauss (1835–1916)
- Oscar Straus (1870–1954)
- Johann Strauss I (1804–1849)
- Johann Strauss II (1825–1899)
- Josef Strauss (1827–1870)
- Richard Strauss (1864–1949)
- Igor Stravinsky (1882–1971)
- Soulima Stravinsky (1910–1994)
- Heinrich Strecker (1893–1981)
- Alessandro Striggio (c. 1536/1537–1592)
- Siegfried Strohbach (1929–2019)
- George Strong (1856–1948)
- Barbara Strozzi (1619–1677)
- Delphin Strungk (1600/1601–1694)
- Nicolaus Adam Strungk (1640–1700)
- Jean-Baptiste Stuck (1680–1755)
- Steven Stucky (1949–2016)
- Morton Subotnick (born 1933)
- Eugen Suchoň (1908–1993)
- Peeter Süda (1883–1920)
- Dana Suesse (1909–1987)
- Rezső Sugár (1919–1988)
- Josef Suk (1874–1935)
- Stjepan Šulek (1914–1986)
- Arthur Sullivan (1842–1900)
- Julius Sulzer (1830–1891)
- Herbert Sumsion (1899–1995)
- Franz von Suppé (1819–1895)
- Carlos Surinach (1915–1997)
- Conrad Susa (1935–2013)
- Tielman Susato (c. 1510/1515–after 1570)
- Franz Xaver Süssmayr (1766–1803)
- Heinrich Sutermeister (1910–1995)
- Margaret Sutherland (1897–1984)
- Johan Svendsen (1840–1911)
- Georgy Sviridov (1915–1998)
- Tomas Svoboda (1939–2022)
- Jan Swafford (born 1946)
- Donald Swann (1923–1994)
- Giles Swayne (born 1946)
- Jan Pieterszoon Sweelinck (1562–1621)
- William Sweeney (born 1950)
- Ferenc Szabó (1902–1969)
- Stanisław Sylwester Szarzyński (c. 1650 – c. 1720)
- Tomasz Szadek (1550–1612)
- Zsigmond Szathmáry (born 1939)
- Tadeusz Szeligowski (1896–1963)
- Albert Szirmai (Sirmay) (1880–1967)
- Władysław Szpilman (1911–2000)
- Maria Agata Szymanowska (1789–1831)
- Karol Szymanowski (1882–1937)

== T ==
- Emil Tabakov (born 1947)
- Paul Taffanel (1844–1908)
- Walter Taieb (born 1973)
- Germaine Tailleferre (1892–1983)
- Ayuo Takahashi (born 1960)
- Yuji Takahashi (born 1938)
- Tōru Takemitsu (1930–1996)
- Otar Taktakishvili (1924–1989)
- Josef Tal (1910–2008)
- Joby Talbot (born 1971)
- Thomas Tallis (c. 1505 – 1585)
- Louise Talma (1906–1996)
- Yankel Talmud (1885–1965)
- Eino Tamberg (1930–2010)
- David Tamkin (1906–1975)
- Bertha Tammelin (1836–1915)
- Tan Dun (born 1957)
- Kohei Tanaka (born 1954)
- Alexander Taneyev (1850–1918)
- Sergei Taneyev (1856–1915)
- Alexandre Tansman (1897–1986)
- Johannes Tapissier (c. 1370–before 1410)
- Tapšiẖuni (c. 1400 BC)
- Angelo Tarchi (1760–1814)
- Mikael Tariverdiev (1931–1996)
- Vladimir Tarnopolsky (born 1955)
- Francisco Tárrega (1852–1909)
- Giuseppe Tartini (1692–1770)
- Phyllis Tate (1911–1987)
- Emil Taubert (1844–1895)
- Wilhelm Taubert (1811–1891)
- Franz Tausch (1762–1817)
- Karl Tausig (1841–1871)
- John Tavener (1944–2013)
- John Taverner (c. 1490 – 1545)
- Deems Taylor (1885–1966)
- Matthew Taylor (born 1964)
- Raynor Taylor (1747–1825)
- Boris Tchaikovsky (Chaikovsky) (1925–1996)
- Pyotr Ilyich Tchaikovsky (1840–1893)
- Alexander Tcherepnin (1899–1977)
- Ivan Tcherepnin (1943–1998)
- Nikolai Tcherepnin (1873–1946)
- Serge Tcherepnin (born 1941)
- António Teixeira (1707–1769)
- Jeroen Tel (born 1972)
- Georg Philipp Telemann (1681–1767)
- Thomas Tellefsen (1823–1874)
- Hope Temple (1859–1938)
- Alec Templeton (1909–1963)
- James Tenney (1934–2006)
- Octave Octavian Teodorescu (born 1963)
- Domènech Terradellas (1713–1751)
- Claude Terrasse (1867–1923)
- Adolf Terschak (1832–1901)
- Melchior Teschner (1584–1635)
- John Tesh (born 1952)
- Flavio Testi (1923–2014)
- George Thalben-Ball (1896–1987)
- Sigismond Thalberg (1812–1871)
- Johann Theile (1646–1724)
- Mikis Theodorakis (1925–2021)
- Károly Thern (1817–1886)
- István Thomán (1862–1940)
- Ambroise Thomas (1811–1896)
- Jennifer Thomas (pianist) (born 1977)
- Randall Thompson (1899–1984)
- Robert Scott Thompson (born 1959)
- César Thomson (1857–1931)
- Virgil Thomson (1896–1989)
- Francis Thorne (1922–2017)
- John Thow (1949–2007)
- Ludwig Thuille (1861–1907)
- Frank Ticheli (born 1958)
- Otto Albert Tichý (1890–1973)
- Jukka Tiensuu (born 1948)
- Anton Ferdinand Tietz (1742–1811)
- Ivo Tijardović (1895–1976)
- Frederick C. Tillis (1930–2020)
- Michael Tilson Thomas (born 1944)
- Christopher Tin (born 1976)
- Johannes Tinctoris (c. 1435 – 1511)
- Edgar Tinel (1854–1912)
- Luís Tinoco (born 1969)
- Dimitri Tiomkin (1894–1979)
- Michael Tippett (1905–1998)
- Boris Tishchenko (1939–2010)
- Jean Titelouze (1562/1563–1633)
- Anton Emil Titl (1809–1882)
- Alexey Nikolayevich Titov (1769–1827)
- Katia Tiutiunnik (born 1967)
- Rudolf Tobias (1873–1918)
- Helen Tobias-Duesberg (1919–2010)
- Ernst Toch (1887–1964)
- Camillo Togni (1922–1993)
- George Tolhurst (1827–1877)
- Václav Tomášek (1774–1850)
- Henri Tomasi (1901–1971)
- Marko Tomasović (born 1976)
- Thomas Tomkins (1572–1656)
- Giuseppe Torelli (1658–1709)
- Michael Torke (born 1961)
- Mel Tormé (1925–1999)
- George William Torrance (1835–1907)
- Francisco de la Torre (fl. 1483–1504)
- Tomás de Torrejón y Velasco (1644–1728)
- José de Torres (1665–1738)
- Raymond Torres-Santos (born 1958)
- Federico Moreno Torroba (1891–1982)
- Paul Tortelier (1914–1990)
- Paolo Tosti (1846–1916)
- Charles Tournemire (1870–1939)
- Allen Toussaint (1938–2015)
- Donald Francis Tovey (1875–1940)
- Joan Tower (born 1938)
- Geoffrey Toye (1889–1942)
- Antonio Tozzi (1736–1812)
- Giovanni Maria Trabaci (1575–1647)
- Tommaso Traetta (1727–1779)
- Cornel Trăilescu (1926–2019)
- Giovanni Battista Treviso (fl. 1650s)
- Jean Balthasar Tricklir (1750–1813)
- Joan Trimble (1915–2000)
- Giacomo Tritto (1733–1824)
- Bartolomeo Tromboncino (c. 1470 – after 1534)
- Friedrich Hieronymus Truhn (1811–1886)
- Frankie Trumbauer (1901–1956)
- Harold Truscott (1914–1992)
- Emahoy Tsegué-Maryam Guèbrou (1923–2023)
- Julia Tsenova (1948–2010)
- Eduard Tubin (1905–1982)
- Tui St. George Tucker (1924–2004)
- David Tudor (1926–1996)
- Henry VIII (1491–1547)
- Erik Tulindberg (1761–1814)
- František Tůma (1704–1774)
- Franz Tunder (1614–1667)
- Joaquín Turina (1882–1949)
- Francesco Turini (1589–1656)
- Daniel Gottlob Türk (1756–1813)
- Mark-Anthony Turnage (born 1960)
- William Turner (1651–1740)
- Roman Turovsky-Savchuk (born 1961)
- Tuotilo (c. 850–915)
- Marco Tutino (born 1954)
- Kalervo Tuukkanen (1909–1979)
- Erkki-Sven Tüür (born 1959)
- Geirr Tveitt (1908–1981)
- Merlijn Twaalfhoven (born 1976)
- Tyagaraja (1767–1847)
- Christopher Tye (c. 1505 – c. 1572)
- Georges Tzipine (1907–1987)

== U ==
- Friedrich Christian Hermann Uber (1781–1822)
- Marco Uccellini (1603/1610–1680)
- Martin Andreas Udbye (1820–1889)
- Nobuo Uematsu (born 1959)
- Vincenzo Ugolini (c. 1580 – 1638)
- Alfred Uhl (1909–1992)
- Viktor Ullmann (1898–1944)
- Chinary Ung (born 1942)
- Benjamin Carl Unseld (1843–1923)
- Erich Urbanner (born 1936)
- Urẖiya (c. 1400 BC)
- Guillermo Uribe Holguín (1880–1971)
- Juan de Urrede (c. 1430 – after 1482)
- Anton Urspruch (1850–1907)
- İlhan Usmanbaş (1921–2025)
- Francesco Usper (Spongia, Sponga) (1561–1641)
- Vladimir Ussachevsky (1911–1990)
- Galina Ustvolskaya (1919–2006)
- Alexander Utendal (1543/1545–1581)
- Francesco Uttini (1723–1795)
- Yolande Uyttenhove (1925–2000)

== V ==
- Nicola Vaccai (1790–1848)
- Pierre Vachon (1731–1803)
- Jacobus Vaet (c. 1529 – 1567)
- Fartein Valen (1887–1952)
- Antonio Valente (fl. 1565–1580)
- Vincenzo Valente (1855–1921)
- Giovanni Valentini (c. 1582 – 1649)
- Giuseppe Valentini (1681–1753)
- Jehan Vaillant (fl. 1360–1390)
- Jean Vallerand (1915–1944)
- Nicolas Vallet (c. 1583 – c. 1642)
- Francesco Antonio Vallotti (1697–1780)
- Francisco Valls (1665–1747)
- David Van Tieghem (born 1955)
- David Van Vactor (1906–1994)
- Jules Van Nuffel (1883–1953)
- Komitas Vardapet (1869–1935)
- Víctor Varela (born 1955)
- Edgard Varèse (1883–1965)
- Urbán de Vargas (1606–1656)
- Alexander Egorovich Varlamov (1801–1848)
- Alexander Vladimirovich Varlamov (1904–1990)
- Louis Varney (1844–1908)
- Pēteris Vasks (born 1946)
- David Vaughan Thomas (1873–1934)
- Ralph Vaughan Williams (1872–1958)
- Orazio Vecchi (1550–1605)
- Artemy Vedel (c. 1767 – 1808)
- Aurelio de la Vega (1925–2022)
- Claudio Veggio (born c. 1510)
- Václav Jindřich Veit (1806–1864)
- Pavel Josef Vejvanovský (c. 1633/1639–1693)
- Jacob ter Veldhuis (born 1951)
- Caetano Veloso (born 1942)
- Ian Venables (born 1955)
- Gaetano Veneziano (1665–1716)
- Alexander Veprik (1899–1958)
- Antonio Veracini (1659–1745)
- Carl Verbraeken (born 1950)
- Francesco Maria Veracini (1690–1768)
- Theo Verbey (1959–2019)
- Philippe Verdelot (c. 1480/1485–c. 1530)
- Giuseppe Verdi (1813–1901)
- Cornelis Verdonck (1563–1625)
- Sándor Veress (1907–1992)
- Johannes Verhulst (1816–1891)
- Gaspar de Verlit (1622–1682)
- Pierre Vermont (c. 1495 – c. 1533)
- Matthijs Vermeulen (1888–1967)
- Alexey Verstovsky (1799–1862)
- Michael Vetter (1943–2013)
- Nicolaus Vetter (1666–1734)
- Lodovico Grossi da Viadana (c. 1560 – 1627)
- Pauline Viardot (1821–1910)
- Tomás Luis de Victoria (c. 1548 – 1611)
- Gerard Victory (1921–1995)
- Jacobus Vide (fl. 1405?–1433)
- Johann Vierdanck (c. 1605 – 1646)
- Louis Vierne (1870–1937)
- Henri François Joseph Vieuxtemps (1820–1881)
- Heitor Villa-Lobos (1887–1959)
- Ángel Villoldo (1861–1919)
- Giovanni Battista Viotti (1755–1824)
- Giulio Viozzi (1912–1984)
- Ezequiel Viñao (born 1960)
- Leonardo Vinci (c. 1690 – 1730)
- Carl Vine (born 1954)
- Sophie Viney (born 1974)
- Param Vir (born 1952)
- Frédéric Viret (undated)
- Robert de Visée (c. 1650 – 1732/1733)
- Ivan Vïshnegradsky (1893–1979)
- Giovanni Battista Vitali (1632–1692)
- Tomaso Antonio Vitali (1663–1745)
- Jan August Vitásek (1770–1839)
- Philippe de Vitry (1291–1361)
- Franco Vittadini (1884–1948)
- Jāzeps Vītols (1863–1948)
- Antonio Vivaldi (1678–1741)
- Amadeo Vives (1871–1932)
- Giovanni Buonaventura Viviani (1638 – c. 1693)
- Claude Vivier (1948–1983)
- Lucrezia Orsina Vizzana (1590–1662)
- Roman Vlad (1919–2013)
- Pancho Vladigerov (1899–1978)
- Wladimir Vogel (1896–1984)
- Georg Joseph Vogler (1749–1814)
- Johann Caspar Vogler (1696–1763)
- Max Vogrich (1852–1916)
- Hans Vogt (1911–1992)
- Robert Voisey (born 1969)
- Kevin Volans (born 1949)
- Franz Volkert (1767–1845)
- Robert Volkmann (1815–1883)
- Andrei Volkonsky (1933–2008)
- Alexander Voormolen (1895–1980)
- Andy Vores (born 1956)
- Jan Václav Voříšek (1791–1825)
- Antonín Vranický (Anton Wranitzky) (1761–1820)
- Jan Vriend (born 1938)
- Klaas de Vries (born 1944)
- Louis Vuillemin (1879–1929)
- Alexander Vustin (1943–2020)

== W ==
- Hubert Waelrant (c. 1517 – 1595)
- Johan Wagenaar (1862–1941)
- Max Wagenknecht (1857–1922)
- Georg Christoph Wagenseil (1715–1777)
- Ignatz Waghalter (1881–1949)
- Josef Franz Wagner (1856–1908)
- Melinda Wagner (born 1957)
- Richard Wagner (1813–1883)
- Wolfram Wagner (born 1962)
- Siegfried Wagner (1869–1930)
- Rudolf Wagner-Régeny (1903–1969)
- Adam z Wągrowca (Adam of Wągrowiec) (died 1629)
- Julian Wagstaff (born 1970)
- Émile Waldteufel (1837–1915)
- Ernest Walker (1870–1949)
- George Walker (1922–2018)
- Lucy Walker (born 1998)
- William Walker (1808–1875)
- Michael Waller (born 1985)
- Anton Wallerstein (1813–1892)
- Stewart Wallace (born 1960)
- William Vincent Wallace (1812–1865)
- Joelle Wallach (born 1946)
- Thomas Attwood Walmisley (1814–1856)
- Craig Walsh (born 1971)
- Jennifer Walshe (born 1974)
- Bruno Walter (1876–1962)
- Ignaz Walter (1755–1822)
- Johann Walter (Blanckenmüller) (1496–1570)
- Walther von der Vogelweide (c. 1170 – c. 1230)
- Johann Gottfried Walther (1684–1748)
- Johann Jakob Walther (1650–1717)
- William Walton (1902–1983)
- Johann Baptist Wanhal (Vaňhal) (1739–1813)
- Johann Wanning (1537–1603)
- John Ward (1571–1638)
- Robert Ward (1917–2013)
- Peter Warlock (1894–1930)
- Henri Warnots (1832–1893)
- Harry Warren (1893–1981)
- Rodney Waschka II (born 1958?)
- Unico Wilhelm van Wassenaer (1692–1766)
- Graham Waterhouse (born 1962)
- Niel van der Watt (born 1962)
- Franz Waxman (1906–1967)
- George James Webb (1803–1887)
- Jimmy Webb (born 1946)
- Samuel Webbe (the elder) (1740–1816)
- Andrew Lloyd Webber (born 1948)
- William Lloyd Webber (1914–1982)
- Julie von Webenau (1813–1887)
- Vilma von Webenau (1875–1953)
- Ben Weber (1916–1979)
- Carl Maria von Weber (1786–1826)
- Anton Webern (1883–1945)
- Matthias Weckmann (c. 1616 – 1674)
- Gaspar van Weerbeke (c. 1445 – after 1516)
- Thomas Weelkes (1576–1623)
- Joseph Weigl (1766–1846)
- Thaddäus Weigl (1776–1844)
- Kurt Weill (1900–1950)
- Jacob Weinberg (1879–1956)
- Mieczysław Weinberg (Moishe Vainberg) (1919–1996)
- Jaromír Weinberger (1896–1967)
- Leó Weiner (1885–1960)
- Felix Weingartner (1863–1942)
- Judith Weir (born 1954)
- Hugo Weisgall (1912–1997)
- Manfred Weiss (1935–2023)
- Sylvius Leopold Weiss (1687–1750)
- Michael Weiße (c. 1488 – 1534)
- Julius Weissenborn (1837–1888)
- Dan Welcher (born 1948)
- John Weldon (1676–1736)
- Egon Wellesz (1885–1974)
- Johann Baptist Wendling (1723–1797)
- Andreas Werckmeister (1645–1706)
- André Werner (born 1960)
- Gregor Joseph Werner (1693–1766)
- Richard Wernick (1934–2025)
- Giaches de Wert (1535–1596)
- Charles Wesley (1707–1788)
- Charles Wesley junior (1757–1834)
- Samuel Wesley (1766–1837)
- Samuel Sebastian Wesley (1810–1876)
- Martin Wesley-Smith (1945–2019)
- Mark Wessel (1894–1973)
- Peter Westergaard (1931–2019)
- Johann Paul von Westhoff (1656–1705)
- Henry Westrop (1812–1879)
- Richard Wetz (1875–1935)
- Christoph Ernst Friedrich Weyse (1774–1842)
- Paul W. Whear (1925–2021)
- Bill Whelan (born 1950)
- Scott Wheeler (born 1952)
- Eric Whitacre (born 1970)
- James Whitbourn (born 1963)
- Benjamin Franklin White (1800–1879)
- John White (1936–2024)
- José Silvestre White Lafitte (1836–1918)
- Gillian Whitehead (born 1941)
- Percy Whitlock (1903–1946)
- Thomas Whythorne (1528–1595)
- Erasmus Widmann (1572–1634)
- Jörg Widmann (born 1973)
- Charles-Marie Widor (1844–1937)
- Henryk Wieniawski (1835–1880)
- Johan Wikmanson (1753–1800)
- Mack Wilberg (born 1955)
- Philip Wilby (born 1949)
- John Wilbye (1574–1638)
- Alec Wilder (1907–1980)
- Philip van Wilder (c. 1500 – 1554)
- Johann Hugo von Wilderer (1670–1724)
- Wilhelmine of Prussia (1709–1758)
- Adrian Willaert (c. 1490 – 1562)
- Healey Willan (1880–1968)
- David Willcocks (1919–2015)
- Grace Williams (1906–1977)
- John Williams (born 1932)
- Spencer Williams (1889–1965)
- Malcolm Williamson (1931–2003)
- Richard Storrs Willis (1819–1900)
- Arthur Wills (1926–2020)
- Meredith Willson (1902–1984)
- Johann Wilhelm Wilms (1772–1847)
- Charles Wilson (1931–2019)
- Ian Wilson (born 1964)
- James Wilson (1922–2005)
- John Wilson (1595–1674)
- Richard Wilson (born 1941)
- Sandy Wilson (1924–2014)
- Thomas Wilson (1927–2001)
- August Wiltberger (1850–1928)
- Heinz Winbeck (1946–2019)
- Herbert Windt (1894–1965)
- Peter Winter (1754–1825)
- Austin Wintory (born 1984)
- Dag Ivar Wirén (1905–1986)
- Michael Wise (c. 1647 – 1687)
- James Wishart (composer) (1956–2018)
- Peter Wishart (1921–1984)
- Christian Friedrich Witt (c. 1660 – 1717)
- Franz Xaver Witt (1834–1888)
- Friedrich Witt (1770–1836)
- Robert William Witt (1930–1967)
- Diane Wittry (born 1964)
- René Wohlhauser (born 1954)
- Erling Wold (born 1958)
- Ernst Wilhelm Wolf (1735–1792)
- Hugo Wolf (1860–1903)
- Ermanno Wolf-Ferrari (1876–1948)
- Christian Wolff (born 1934)
- Joseph Wölfl (1773–1812)
- Joseph Maria Wolfram (1789–1839)
- Oswald von Wolkenstein (c. 1376 – 1445)
- Stefan Wolpe (1902–1972)
- Hyo-Won Woo (born 1974)
- Charles Wood (1866–1926)
- Hugh Wood (born 1932)
- Victoria Wood (1953–2016)
- Robert Woodcock (c. 1690 – 1728)
- Richard Woodward (c. 1743 – 1777)
- Guy Woolfenden (1937–2016)
- John Woolrich (born 1954)
- Felix Woyrsch (1860–1944)
- Pavel Wranitzky (1756–1808)
- Heinz Wunderlich (1919–2012)
- Charles Wuorinen (1938–2020)
- Alex Wurman (born 1966)
- Arnold van Wyk (1916–1983)
- Ruth Shaw Wylie (1916–1989)
- Yehudi Wyner (born 1929)
- Ivan Wyschnegradsky (1893–1979)

== X ==
- Haris Xanthoudakis (1950–2023)
- Iannis Xenakis (1922–2001)
- Xian Xinghai (1905–1945)
- Xiao Shuxian (1905–1991)
- Spyridon Xyndas (1812–1896)

== Y ==
- Kosaku Yamada (1886–1965)
- Yehuda Yannay (1937–2023)
- Yanni (born 1954)
- Christopher Yavelow (born 1950)
- Yitzhak Yedid (born 1971)
- Dwight Yoakam (born 1956)
- Takashi Yoshimatsu (born 1953)
- Makoto Yoshimori (born 1969)
- Michèl Yost (1754–1786)
- Christopher Young (born 1957)
- James Young (born 1949)
- John Young (born 1962)
- La Monte Young (born 1935)
- Polly Young (Maria Barthélemon) (1749–1799)
- Eugène Ysaÿe (1858–1931)
- Théophile Ysaÿe (1865–1918)
- Sergei Yuferov (1865 – after 1906)
- Du Yun (born 1977)
- Isang Yun (1917–1995)
- Yoichiro Yoshikawa (born 1957)

== Z ==
- Zacara da Teramo (c. 1350/1360–c. 1413/1416)
- Jan Zach (1699–1773)
- Nicolaus Zacharie (fl. from 1420; died 1466)
- Friedrich Wilhelm Zachow (1663–1712)
- Judith Lang Zaimont (born 1945)
- Ivan Zajc (1832–1914)
- Giovanni Zamboni (fl. early 18th century)
- Riccardo Zandonai (1883–1944)
- Andrea Zani (1696–1757)
- Frank Zappa (1940–1993)
- Nikolai Zaremba (1821–1879)
- Gioseffo Zarlino (1517–1590)
- Aleksander Zarzycki (1834–1895)
- Záviš of Zápy (c. 1350 – c. 1411)
- Isidora Žebeljan (born 1967)
- Kristoffer Zegers (born 1973)
- Friedrich Zehm (1923–2007)
- Jan Dismas Zelenka (1679–1745)
- Władysław Żeleński (1837–1921)
- Carl Zeller (1842–1898)
- Carl Friedrich Zelter (1758–1832)
- Alexander von Zemlinsky (1871–1942)
- Hans Zender (1936–2019)
- Juan García de Zéspedes (c. 1619 – 1678)
- Zhu Jian'er (1922–2017)
- Marc'Antonio Ziani (c. 1653 – 1715)
- Otakar Zich (1879–1934)
- Adrian von Ziegler (born 1989)
- Karl Michael Ziehrer (1843–1922)
- Mikołaj Zieleński (c. 1560 – c. 1620)
- Hermann Zilcher (1881–1948)
- Winfried Zillig (1905–1963)
- Hans Zimmer (born 1957)
- Agnes Zimmermann (1845–1925)
- Anton Zimmermann (1741–1781)
- Bernd Alois Zimmermann (1918–1970)
- Heinz Werner Zimmermann (1930–2022)
- Margrit Zimmermann (1927–2020)
- Pierre-Joseph-Guillaume Zimmermann (1785–1853)
- Udo Zimmermann (1943–2021)
- Walter Zimmermann (born 1949)
- Niccolò Antonio Zingarelli (1752–1837)
- Domenico Zipoli (1688–1726)
- Tomislav Zografski (1934–2000)
- Farid Zoland (born 1955)
- Alfred Hans Zoller (1928–2006)
- Carl Friedrich Zöllner (1800–1860)
- Heinrich Zöllner (1854–1941)
- John Zorn (born 1953)
- Valentin Zubiaurre (1837–1914)
- Marija Zubova (1749–1799)
- Carlo Zuccari (1703–1782)
- Jeremy Zuckerman (born 1975)
- Manuel de Zumaya (c. 1678 – 1755)
- Emilie Zumsteeg (1796–1857)
- Johann Rudolf Zumsteeg (1760–1802)
- Ralph Zurmühle (born 1959)
- Bernard Zweers (1854–1924)
- Ellen Taaffe Zwilich (born 1939)
- Guglielmo Zuelli (1859–1941)

== See also ==
- Lists of composers
- List of operas by composer which lists more than 700 opera composers, their dates and works.
