= Andrea Ferrante =

Italian composer

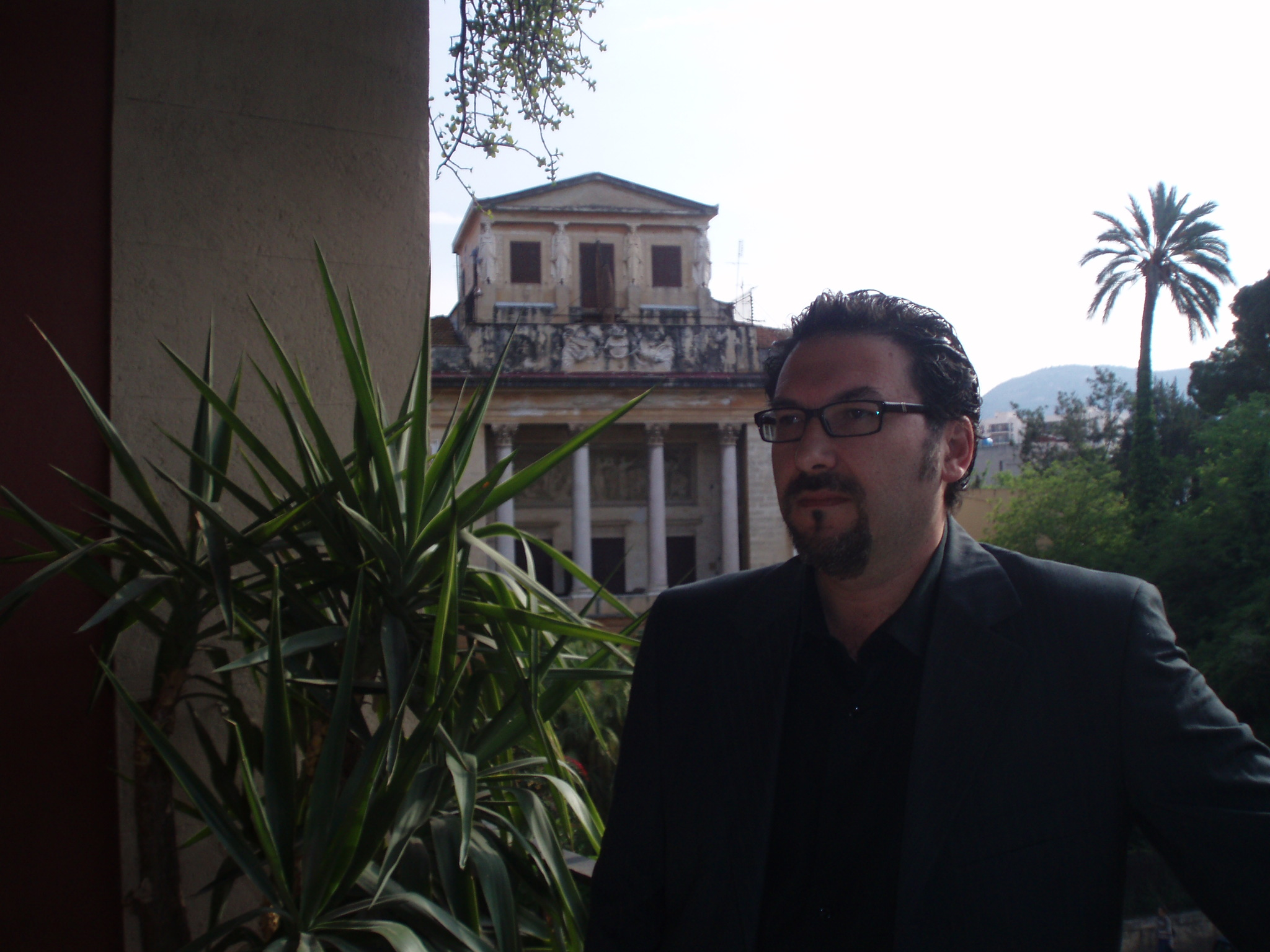
- Born: August 16, 1968 (age 57); Palermo, Italy
- Occupations: Composer, professor
- Style: Contemporary, film music

Andrea Ferrante (born 16 August 1968, Palermo, Italy) is an Italian composer whose music is performed throughout Europe, Asia and the Americas and published by Videoradio and Rai Trade Labels, Edizioni Carrara and Edizioni Simeoli. He teaches at the Conservatorio di Musica di Stato "Arcangelo Corelli" in Messina.

== Composing ==
His compositional activity, as shown in the essay Backstage of the creative act, the music psychologist Rosa Alba Gambino, can be divided into two phases: the first (which ends with the composition of the holy La sposa del vento for soloists, chorus and orchestra staged in Palermo in 2000 by Operalaboratorio) in which Andrea Ferrante investigates the Mediterranean sounds of his land through the filter of the contemporary, and the second (after ten years of silence, and in collaboration with his favourite pianist Domenico Piccichè) in which the mature composer's own language is inspired by multiculturalism and the concept of emotion / enjoyment of music that cast its production outside Europe.

His compositional activity ranges from classical music to that for the image, even through recent collaborations in pop music with Giovanna Nocetti and Paolo Limiti (poet and TV presenter) which, exclusively for his music, wrote the lyrics to "The Man of no".

== Works ==
Instrument solo

- Arrow (for piano)
- Déjà vu (for cello)
- Dimenticata (for harp)
- Ikebana (for cello)
- Improvvisamente (for piano)
- La luna riflessa (for piano)
- Narrow sequence (for cello solo or cello and piano)
- Postludio a un sogno (for piano)
- Prezioso (for piano)
- Shuluq (for clarinet solo or clarinet and digital sounds)
- Solo One (for doublebass)

Voice and piano (or other instruments)

- A mezzodì (for tenore and piano)
- Angels from Heaven (for soprano and piano)
- Ave Maria (for soprano and piano)
- Brindisi (for mezzo-soprano and string quartet)
- Christ the King (for mezzo-soprano and piano)
- Come un fiore (for soprano and piano)
- Compiuta donzella (for mezzo-soprano and piano)
- Con il fior della bocca umida (for basso and piano)
- Deux Chants (for soprano and piano)
- Di miele e di cetra (for soprano and piano)
- Due arie marine (for soprano and piano)
- Due arie napoletane (for basso and piano)
- Due canti frizzanti (for mezzo-soprano and piano)
- E lunghe cantilene (for soprano and piano)
- Il vento scrive (for soprano and piano)
- In cerca del tuo viso (for tenore or soprano and orchestra)
- In cerca del tuo viso (for voice and piano)
- L'incanto Circeo (for soprano and piano)
- L'intensa voglia (for soprano and piano)
- L'istinto del mare (for soprano and piano)
- L'orma (for soprano and piano)
- La sabbia del tempo (for tenore and piano)
- Le lampade marine (for soprano and piano)
- Le lune di Saffo (for soprano and piano)
- Non declinare (for soprano and piano)
- Ricorda il tuo calore (for mezzo-soprano and piano)
- Tienimi (for basso and piano)

Duos

- A bassa voce (for violin and piano)
- Accesi bagliori (for sax soprano and piano)
- Ascendente (for trumpet and piano)
- Aspettami (for trumpet and organ)
- Ci penso ancora (for flute and guitar)
- Como la tarde (for violin and piano)
- Così ti penso (for sax baritone and piano)
- Dimenticata luna (for guitar and harp)
- Dolcemente (for horn and harp)
- Elegia d'autunno (for flute and organ)
- Excentrique (for piano four hands)
- Filtrò poi una luce (for viola and piano)
- Il canto e la brezza (for cello and harp)
- Il fiore d'inverno (for viola and harp)
- Impulsive Mush for piano four hands
- In riva (for cello and piano)
- In lontananza (for horn and piano)
- Incandescente (for trumpet and piano)
- La danza sconnessa (for flute and piano)
- La musa smarrita (for bassoon and piano)
- Le jeu oublié (for euphonium and piano)
- Minuetto Primo (for 2 cellos)
- Minuetto Secondo (for 2 cellos)
- Minuetto Terzo (for 2 cellos)
- Misurati palpiti (for 2 cellos)
- Moving (for euphonium and piano)
- Nuance (for flute and harp)
- Siciliana (for guitars duo)
- Slow Tango (for trumpet and accordion)
- Sly (for clarinet and piano)
- Tenue (for euphonium and tuba)
- Ti cerco ancora (for violin and piano)
- Trame (for sax and accordion)
- Un tramonto (for violin and cello)
- Un'alba ancora (for trombone and piano)

Trios

- D'un tratto (for flute, violin and piano)
- Free Emotion (for sax soprano, cello and piano)
- Il petalo blu (for flute, viola and harp)
- Il sentiero del vento (for violin, doublebass and accordion or Piano)
- Mare – Le lampade marine (for soprano, cello and piano)
- Notte velata (for harps)
- Trine (for violin, cello and piano)

Quartets

- Chiaroscuro (for trumpet quartet)
- D'improvviso (for string quartet)
- D'incanto (for string quartet)
- D'intensa intesa (for sax quartet)
- Eclectic turn (for sax quartet)
- Il cuore stregato (for string quartet)
- In appearance (for trombone quartet)
- Infinity land (for string quartet)
- Itinere (for clarinet quartet)
- Kirkos (for sax quartet)
- La danza delle fate belle (for flute quartet)
- L'enigma svelato (for brass quartet)
- Poetica (for string quartet)
- Le stelle di Lyra (for brass quartet)
- Un gesto appena (for flute, violin, cello and piano)
- Vespro (for string quartet)

Quintets

- Di bianco velato (for english horn, 3 clarinets and bass clarinet)
- Di te che avvolgi (for clarinet, sax, violin, cello and piano)
- Innovative quintet (for wind quintet)
- Narrami, o Musa... (for brass quintet)

Ensembles

- Come allora (for trombones ensemble)
- In the frame (for trombones ensemble)
- Insolito stupore (for ensemble)
- Intens brass (for brass ensemble)
- Ottoni d Irlanda (for brass ensemble)
- Parodia di un burattino (for wind quintet and piano four hands

Choir

- Deck the halls (simple Christmas song for choir)
- Jesus, Jesus rest your head (simple Christmas song for choir)
- Laudate Dominum (for professional children s choir and piano)
- Yo no tengo otra voz (for soprano, choir and piano)

String orchestra

- Cinque Miniature (for string orchestra)
- Elegante (for accordion and string orchestra)
- Il bacio mancato (for flute and string orchestra)
- L'orizzonte e oltre (for viola and string orchestra)

Orchestra

- Di impeto lucente (for brass orchestra)
- Nel passo del sole (for synphonic band)
- Rapsodia in verde (for junior orchestra)

Concerts

- Concerto Primo (for flute and orchestra)
- Concerto Secondo (for horn and orchestra)
- Morricone's Concert (for two pianos and orchestra)

== Recordings ==
- The Sensual Style, Francesco Bruno (fl), Maurizio Rocca (vn), Adriano Fazio (vc), Domenico Piccichè (piano), introduction by Giovanni Sollima, Videoradio Labels, 2011.
- Free Emotion, Domenico Piccichè (piano) et al., Introduction by Ennio Morricone, Videoradio-RAI Trade, 2011.
- Axios-Ferrante. Axios String Quartet, Videoradio-RAI Trade, Milano 2011, VRCD000784. Introduction by Lalo Schifrin
- Over the Horizon, Videoradio-RAI Trade, Milano 2011, VRCD000784. Introduction by Michael Giacchino
- Mare. Arpinè Rahdjian (soprano), Domenico Piccichè (piano), Giorgio Gasbarro (cello), Undici07 Records, Palermo 2012.
