= Domenico Picciché =

Italian pianist and composer

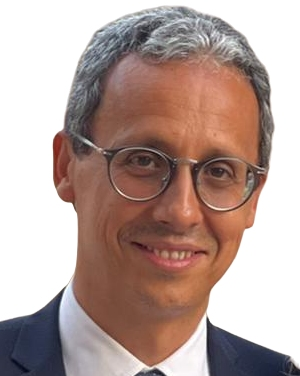
- Piccichè in 2024
- Born: 18 July 1970 (age 56)
- Occupation: Pianist
- Website: www.domenicopicciche.com

Domenico Picciché (Italian pronunciation: [doˈmeːniko pittʃiˈke]; born 18 July 1970), is an Italian pianist, composer and jurist.

== Biography ==
Originary from Alcamo, in the Province of Trapani, he started the study of piano when aged only six and got his secondary school diploma, with honours, at the Liceo Scientifico Giuseppe Ferro in Alcamo.

In 1988, when aged only eighteen, he earned his Academic Diploma in Piano from the Conservatory of Music Alessandro Scarlatti in Palermo, magna cum laude.

He studied pianoforte with giants of world pianism, such as Jörg Demus, Maria Tipo, Franco Scala, Boris Petrushansky, Aldo Ciccolini; composition with Eliodoro Sollima; analysis with Piero Rattalino.

He was awarded in "Ibla Grand Prize International Piano Competition", 1st prize at "Città di Roma" Competition. 2nd prize (1st not assigned) at Enna "F. P. Neglia" International Competition.

Specialized in piano transcription repertoire, he discovered and interpreted piano transcriptions by famous and unknown musicians (from Jan Sibelius to Antonio Scontrino). He also composed piano transcriptions, like La Valse by Maurice Ravel and Scaramouche by Darius Milhaud.

His concert career took him throughout the world: Alice Tully Hall (Lincoln Center), New York City; New York University; Tokyo Opera City Concert Hall; Französischer Dom, Berlin; Auditorium S. Cecilia, Rome; Eglise Saint-Merri and Centre Européen des Activités Artistiques, Paris; Tübingen University; Keizersgrachtkerk, Amsterdam; Sofia National Theatre; Zernezer Musikwochen Festival (Switzerland); Internationales KammerMusikFestival am Gendarmenmarkt (Germany).

His musical partners have included tenor Pietro Ballo, soprano Arpiné Rahdjian, violist Demetrio Comuzzi, cellists Luca Pincini and Giorgio Gasbarro (first cellist at Palermo Teatro Massimo), dancer Oriella Dorella (étoile at Teatro alla Scala, Milan). With the Italian pianist Nina Gallo he has formed the Duo Excentrique.

He is the favourite interpreter of the Italian contemporary composer Andrea Ferrante to whom he dedicated a trilogy of CDs.

He graduated in law, cum laude, at Palermo University, with the thesis on Artistic Creation and Interpretation in Law. He is a pioneer of the studies of Entertainment Law in Italy.

He writes for Arnoldo Mondadori Editore and Rugginenti, Milan, Italy.

He is professor of Pianoforte and Law at the Palermo National Conservatory of Music (Italy), and former Vice Director and Coordinator of the legislative Bureau at the Trapani National Conservatory of Music.

He has been Expert for Italian National Agency for the Evaluation of the University System (ANVUR)

The Italian television series "Tutta la musica del cuore" was inspired by the battles for legality he conducted at the Conservatory of Music in Trapani, Sicily.

== Recordings ==
- Eros e Thanatos. Love and Death. Domenico Picciché (pianoforte), Phoenix classics, Montebelluna, Italy, 1999, PH99501
- Andrea Ferrante. The Sensual Style. Domenico Picciché (pianoforte) et al., Videoradio, Milan, Italy, 2011, VRCD000786. Introduction by Giovanni Sollima.
- Andrea Ferrante. Free Emotion. Domenico Picciché (pianoforte) et al., Videoradio-RAI Trade, Milan, Italy, 2011, VRCD000795. Introduction by Ennio Morricone.
- Andrea Ferrante. Mare. Arpinè Rahdjian (soprano), Domenico Picciché (pianoforte), Giorgio Gasbarro (cello), Undici07 Records, Palermo, Italy, 2012. Introduction by Marco Betta.

== Piano transcriptions ==
- La Valse. Concert Transcription for Piano Solo from the original orchestral score by Maurice Ravel, ASAP, Italy, 2nd ed. 2026.
- Scaramouche. Concert transcription for one piano, four hands, from the original two pianos score by Darius Milhaud, ASAP, Italy, 2011.

== Editions and revisions ==
- Ludwig van Beethoven. Original Full Cadenzas for the Piano Concertos nos. 1-4. Including the first unfinished Cadenza for the Piano Concerto no. 1, revised and completed by Domenico Piccichè, ASAP, Italy, 2026.

== Literary works and essays ==
- Domenico Picciché et al., Le novelle del Modello Pirandello (The Novels of "Pirandello" Literary Prize), Arnoldo Mondadori Editore, Milan, Italy, 1991.
- Domenico Picciché, Il classicismo e Mozart (Classicism and Mozart), Collana di analisi musicale (Musical Analysis Series), Siliqua editore, Italy, 1992.
- Domenico Picciché, Gli addii di Beethoven (Beethoven's Farewell), Collana di analisi musicale (Musical Analysis Series), Siliqua editore, Italy, 1992.
- Domenico Picciché, Creazione e Interpretazione artistica nel Diritto. Teoria Generale (Artistic Creation and Interpretation in Law. General Theory), ASAP, Italy, 2000.
- Domenico Picciché, Elementi di Diritto dello spettacolo. Guida per l'artista (Elements of Entertainment Law. An Artist's Guide), Rugginenti, Milan, Italy, 2005.
- Domenico Picciché et al., Progetto CORO.lla. Monitoraggio delle attività musicali nelle scuole della Sicilia (CORO.lla Project. A Monitoring of Musical Activities in Sicilian Schools), MIUR (Italian Ministry of Education, university and Research) USR Sicilia, Italy, 2007.
- Domenico Picciché, Elementi di Diritto d'autore e dello Spettacolo. Guida per l'artista (Elements of Copyright and Entertainment Law. An Artist's Guide), New revised Edition, Rugginenti, Milan, Italy, 2018.
- Domenico Picciché, Compendio di Diritto d'Autore e dello Spettacolo. Guida per l'artista (Compendium of Copyright and Entertainment Law. An Artist's Guide), ed. 2026, ASAP, Italy, 2026.
- Domenico Picciché, Il Gioco Interiore del Musicista. Manuale di Psicologia della performance (The Inner Game of the Musician. A Manual of Performance Psychology), ASAP, Italy, 2026.
- Domenico Picciché, RESET, ASAP, Italy, 2026.

== Translations ==
- Nina Gallo, Piano Transcription: History and Reception , English Translation by Domenico Piccichè, ASAP, Italy, 2026.

== Bibliography ==
- S. Mugno (1996). Novecento letterario trapanese (in Italian). Regione Siciliana, Assessorato dei beni culturali e ambientali e della pubblica istruzione. p. 197.
- Musical America. Primedia Information. 1999. pp. 245–330.
- Rassegna storica del Risorgimento: organo della Società nazionale per la storia del Risorgimento italiano (in Italian). Vol. 89. Società nazionale per la storia del risorgimento italiano. 2002. pp. 28–29.
- A. Checco (2005). Giuseppe La Farina. La vita, le idee, le opere (in Italian). A. Sfameni. p. 50.
- L.S. Olschki (2006). Il Saggiatore musicale (in Italian). Vol. 13. p. 202.
- R.A. Gambino (2011). il Palindromo (PDF) (in Italian). p. 78.
