= Guglielmo Zuelli =

Italian composer and conductor (1859–1941)

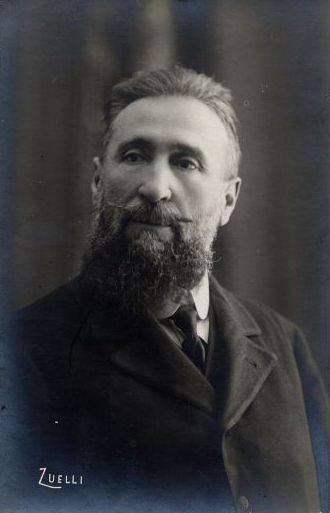
- Zuelli c. 1910
- Born: 20 October 1859; Reggio Emilia, Duchy of Modena and Reggio
- Died: 17 October 1941 (aged 81); Milan, Italy
- Occupations: Composer; conductor; conservatory director
- Organizations: Palermo Conservatory; Parma Conservatory; Alessandria Conservatory

Guglielmo Zuelli (20 October 1859 – 17 October 1941) was an Italian composer, conductor, and music educator. As a composer he achieved fame for his first opera Fata del Nord which premiered in Milan in 1884. Both his first and second opera, Mokanna o Il profeta del Korasan, were published by Casa Ricordi. However, his second opera has never been performed. His other compositions consist of several sacred choral works and a number of symphonic pieces written in a style similar to his contemporaries Giacomo Puccini, Alberto Franchetti, and Pietro Mascagni.

Born into poverty, Zuelli's early childhood was marred by the death of his parents at the age of three. He spent the next five years living with his maternal grandmother, surviving by working as a street performer, beggar, and thief. He spent some time in prison before the age of eight when he was ultimately placed in an orphanage in his native city of Reggio Emilia. There he received his initial musical training, and ultimately was able to train as a professional musician at the Liceo Musicale in Bologna with the aid of a wealthy benefactor.

Upon completing his studies, he embarked on a career as a music teacher; working first at the newly established Institute of the Blind in Bologna from 1882 to 1886. He simultaneously had a busy career as an opera conductor from 1884 through 1889. In 1889 he was appointed director of the Civica Scuola Musicale in Forli and in 1894 he joined the faculty of the Palermo Conservatory. He served as director of the Palermo Conservatory from 1895 until January 1912 when he became director of the Parma Conservatory. He remained in that post until his announced retirement in 1929. However, later that year he accepted an appointment as director of the Alessandria Conservatory and continued in that role until his final retirement in 1933.

== Early life and education ==
Born in Reggio Emilia, Guglielmo Zuelli was the son of Giuseppe Zuelli and his wife, Giuseppa Caprari. His father worked as a saddler. Many of his relatives were involved in petty theft; and several women in his family made their living as pickpockets. Both of his parents died suddenly on 24 October 1862 when Guglielmo was three years old. He was cared for by his maternal grandmother with whom he lived in poverty. The pair survived over the next five years through busking on the streets; singing duets together, and occasionally resorting to petty theft. Guglielmo spent part of this time in his early childhood in prison.

At the age of eight, Guglielmo's uncle placed him in an orphanage in Reggio Emilia. It was at this institution that he received his first music education; learning the rudiments of music from the organist and conductor Giuseppe Grisanti who was a part time music educator at the orphanage. After completing his elementary education at the orphanage, he was apprenticed to a maker of coaches at the age of 14. After some time there, he apprenticed with a furniture maker before ultimately becoming an apprentice to the theatrical designer Prospero Cattellani.

Zuelli's experiences working in the theatre with Cattellani increased his interests in music, and he was ultimately able to pursue training as a musician at the Liceo Musicale in Bologna through the financial support of a wealthy benefactor. There he studied music composition for the first four years under Alessandro Busi, and then with Luigi Mancinelli in 1881–1882. He graduated from the Liceo Musicale in July 1882 with a teaching degree in music composition.

== Career ==
While still in school, Zuelli made his professional debut as a conductor during Carnival of 1882 leading a performance of Achille Lucidi's opera Ivan that was mounted by the Società felsinea di Bologna. His first composition of note, the symphonic poem for choir and orchestra Un saluto al mare, suddiviso in quattro parti premiered at his graduation ceremony in July 1882 by the student orchestra and chorus of the Liceo Musicale; and not long after the third movement of that work was accepted for publication by Casa Ricordi. Following his graduation, he obtained employment as a music teacher at the newly founded Institute for the Blind in Bologna where he taught from 1882 through 1886.

Zuelli drew critical acclaim for his one act opera Fata del Nord which premiered at the Teatro Manzoni in Milan on 4 May 1884. The writer Naborre Campanini wrote the libretto for the opera, and the work won first prize in an opera composition competition sponsored by the publisher Edoardo Sonzogno. Giacomo Puccini was another composer who competed in this competition; submitting his opera Le Villi. The prelude of the opera was conducted by Franco Faccio at the 1884 world's fair in Turin, and in 1885 Zuelli conducted nine performances of the opera at the Teatro Municipale in Reggio Emilia where it was enthusiastically received.

The publisher Casa Ricordi obtained the publishing rights to Fata del Nord and simultaneously commissioned Zuelli's second and final opera, Mokanna o Il profeta del Korasan; a work whose libretto by Alberto Ghislanzoni was based on Shakespeare's The Tempest. Zuelli completed this opera in 1886 and while Ricordi did publish the score, the work was never performed.

From 1884 to 1889, Zuelli maintained a busy schedule as an opera conductor. He worked in that capacity at the Teatro Brunetti in Bologna, the Teatro Goldoni in Venice, the Teatro Comunale Modena, and at opera houses in Montagnana, Novellara, Este, Crevalcore, Russi, Forlì, and Rimini. His conducting schedule slowed after he was unanimously appointed director of the Civica Scuola Musicale in Forli in 1889 by a committee made up of professors from the Naples Conservatory. In Forlì he met Virginia Manuzzi who was from a wealthy family in that city. They married on 7 December 1892.

In 1894 Zuelli left his position in Forli to join the faculty of the Palermo Conservatory. In 1895 he was appointed director of that institution. His notable pupils at the conservatory included Alfredo Cuscinà, Edoardo Dagnino, Stefano Donaudy, Gino Marinuzzi, Giuseppe Mulè, Giovanni Mulè, and Francesco Paolo Neglia. He left his position in Palermo in January 1912 when he was appointed director of the Parma Conservatory. While still in that position, he concurrently served as the president of the Accademia Filarmonica di Bologna from 1920 through 1924. He retired from the director of the conservatory in 1929; at which point Luigi Ferrari Trecate succeeded him as director of the Parma Conservatory.

Zuelli came out of his retirement shortly after it began, when he was asked to be the director of the Civico Liceo Musicale di Alessandria (now the Conservatorio Antonio Vivaldi in Alessandria); a position he held from 1929 through 1933. With his wife having died in 1910, Zuelli spent the final years of his life in Milan in the home of one of his pupils from Alessandria, the soprano Magda Piccarolo, whom he helped get established on the opera stage. He died in Piccarolo's home on 17 October 1941 at the age of 81.
