= Don Carlos (play) =

Historical tragedy by Friedrich Schiller

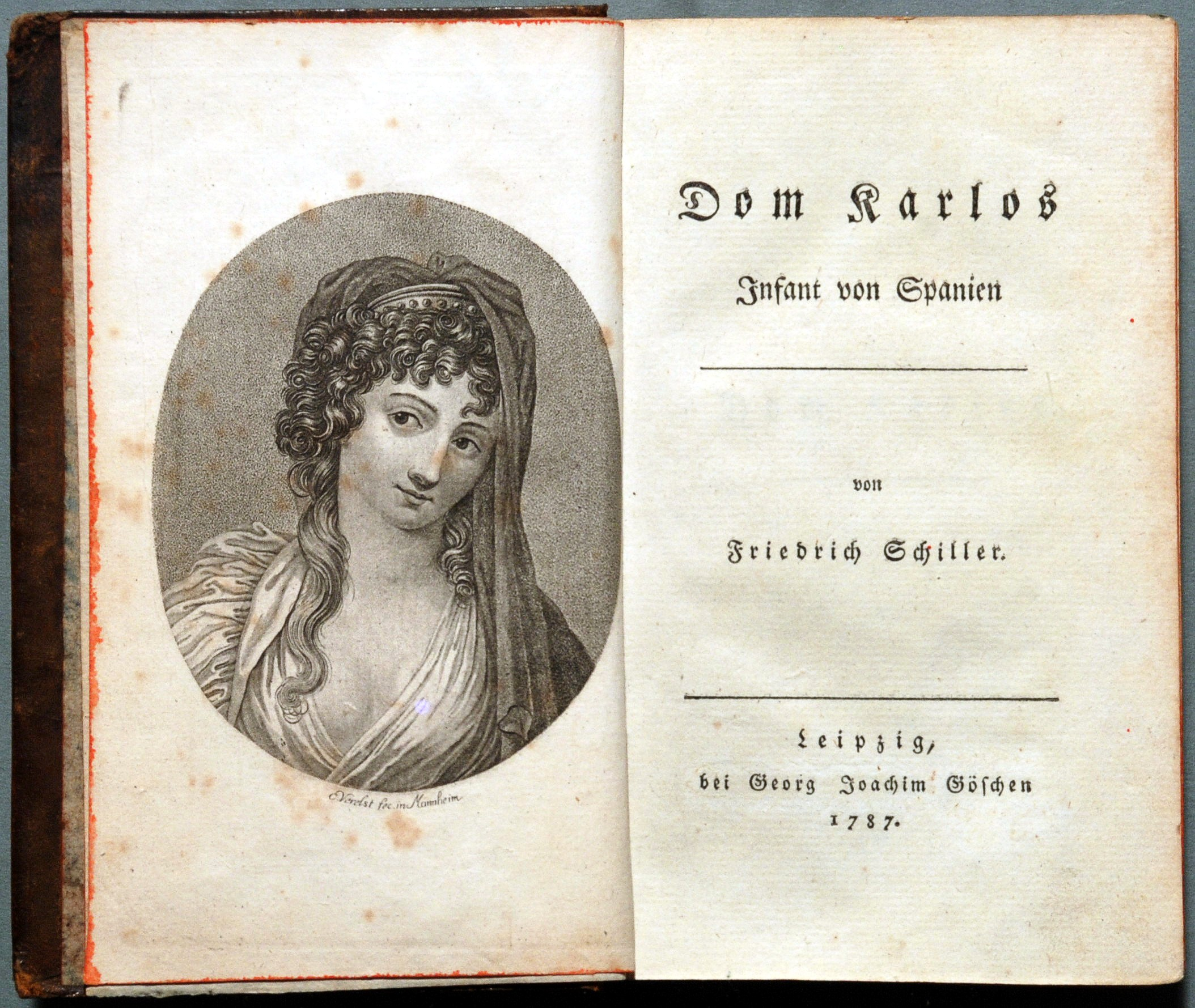
- Don Karlos, Leipzig, 1787
- Original language: German
- Written by: Friedrich von Schiller
- Characters: Carlos, Prince of Asturias; Philip II of Spain; Duke of Alba; Elisabeth of Valois; Princess of Eboli; Marquis of Posa
- Genre: Drama
- Setting: Spanish Court at Aranjuez

Don Carlos (German: Don Karlos, Infant von Spanien, (Note: Schiller replaced the Portuguese spelling "Dom" with the Spanish "Don" in 1801, after Christoph Martin Wieland had made him aware of the difference.) German pronunciation: [dɔn ˈkaʁlɔs ɪnˈfant fɔn ˈʃpaːni̯ən]) is a historical tragedy in five acts by Friedrich Schiller, loosely based on historical events during the reign of King Philip II of Spain. It was written between 1783 and 1787 and first produced in Hamburg in 1787.

== Background ==
The play is loosely based on historical events in the 16th century under the reign of King Philip II of Spain, following the title character of Don Carlos.

It deals with Prince Carlos' personal emotional and political struggles, the latter of which are made clear through the figure of the Marquis of Posa, who fights for liberty during the rule of Catholic Spain during the Reformation.

== Plot ==
It opens as Don Carlos, Philip's son and Prince of Spain, is reunited with his childhood friend, the Marquis of Posa. The Marquis has returned from long travels as a spokesperson for the Netherlands, which is largely Protestant and struggling against Spain's Catholic occupation, and hopes to gain Carlos' support. Meanwhile, Carlos is preoccupied by his love for Elisabeth of Valois, his prior fiancée and current wife of King Philip—therefore his step-mother and out of reach. The marquis, who personally knows the queen, arranges a private meeting between her and Carlos. However, when Carlos confesses his love, she rejects him and reminds him of his duties towards the Spanish people.

Carlos talks to King Philip and asks for reconciliation and to be sent to Flanders to deal with the insurrection, like Posa urged him to, despite his lingering resentment against his father. The king refuses both pleas and instead plans to send the Duke of Alba, who is known for his cruelty.

Carlos receives a love letter, which he wrongly believes to be from the queen. He is overjoyed until he finds out that the letter was from the Princess of Eboli, who confesses her love to him and shows him a letter from the king asking to make her the king's mistress. Moved, Carlos assures her his friendship and admits that he himself is in love, but with a different woman, and keeps the king's letter to bring the queen. Eboli, unrequited in her love, figures out Carlos' true love and swears revenge.

Soon, she is approached by the Duke of Alba and Pater Domingo, who are similarly plotting against Carlos. They want her to tell the king about Carlos' and Elisabeth's love and encourage her to steal revealing letters from Elisabeth. Meanwhile, Carlos tells the marquis about recent events. Posa takes the king's letter to Eboli from him and tries to remind Carlos of his previous ideals.

As King Philip hears about the meeting between Carlos and the queen as well as several rumours, mostly from Alba and Domingo, he grows increasingly paranoid and distrustful of his wife and son, ready to kill them. He longs for someone who is willing to tell him the truth and finally decides to talk to the Marquis of Posa, who has an honourable reputation.

Posa initially refuses to serve the king and makes a speech for humanity, pleading to free people's minds rather than continuing an oppressive rule. Philip, impressed by his courage and outspokenness, makes him a minister and personal advisor; he now sees him as a friend who can uncover the true relationship of Carlos and the queen.

Posa seemingly agrees, but wants the queen to convince Carlos to secretly flee to Brussels and rebel against the king to free the Netherlands. He brings Carlos the queen's letter about this plan and asks for Carlos' wallet.

Meanwhile, Elisabeth has discovered Eboli's theft of her letters between her and Carlos and blames the king, which results in a fight. Marquis Posa hands Carlos' wallet over to Philip, who then finds Eboli's letter to Carlos and seeks to arrest his son. Count Lerma warns Carlos of Posa's apparent betrayal; Carlos tries to ask Eboli for help, whom he wrongly sees as his only remaining friend; Posa arrests Carlos.

Princess Eboli finally admits to the queen that she stole the letters and let herself become the king's mistress. The marquis realises that his original plan failed and asks the queen to remind Carlos of his vow to create freedom.

Posa visits Carlos in his cell and tells him about a new, fake letter for the king to find, that paints Posa himself as a traitor and rids Carlos of any allegations. Alba comes to free the apparently wrongly imprisoned Carlos, but the prince sends him away to be freed by the king himself. Posa explains Eboli's betrayal and his own plan to sacrifice himself for his friend; he is shot within the cell while talking to Carlos.

The king, bitterly disappointed by Posa's treason, wants to release his son. However, Carlos calls him a murderer and tells him of his and Posa's friendship. An officer warns that citizens are threatening to revolt due to Carlos' imprisonment. Lerma convinces the grieving prince to flee to Brussels, like Posa intended. The grand inquisitor, meanwhile, blames King Philip for the murder of Posa and human weakness and demands the prince as a sacrifice in return. Carlos is caught before he can flee and the king gives him to the Inquisition.

== Ambiguity in depiction ==
In 1982, Lesley Sharpe argued that with Don Carlos, Schiller moved away from character-based drama, and that the play's universe "casts a shadow of ambiguity" on its characters because of the complexity of the situation.

== Reception ==
According to Schiller himself, the two main criticisms of Don Carlos were that it lacked unity and that the actions of the Marquis Posa were implausible. In Briefe über Don Carlos (1788), he claimed that two acts is too little time for a gradual development of Philip's trust in Posa. Schiller defended Posa's actions with arguments from character.

Rudiger Gorner claimed in Standpoint that Kenneth Tynan once criticized Don Carlos as "a Spanish tragedy composed of themes borrowed from Hamlet and Phèdre", though according to The Guardian's Michael Billington, Tynan was actually writing about Schiller's play Mary Stuart (1800) after seeing a 1958 performance of that work at The Old Vic. Sharpe claimed that Schiller's defenses of Posa are unsuccessful because the play is not character-based in the first place, though she also said that Schiller's overall discussion of the play ultimately does "less than justice [...] to the play as a work of art". Gorner argued that the "sheer musicality of Schiller's verse" is shown by such works as Don Carlos, as well as The Robbers (1781) and Intrigue and Love (1784).

=== Performance in Nazi-era Berlin ===
Joseph Goebbels attended a performance of Don Carlos during World War II, at the Deutsches Theater in Berlin. Following Posa's speech about the horrors of Flanders and Brabant to King Philip, concluding with, “Sire, allow freedom of thought!” the audience engaged in "applause, stamping, shouting, and chanting" throughout the theater. After fifteen minutes, the lights were suddenly turned on the audience turned quiet. As the play continued with Philip's answer, "Strange fanatic," Goebbels rose and applauded alone.

== Influence ==
Jeffrey L. High (CSULB) has found influences of Schiller's plays on the screenplays for several Hollywood films, and in particular suggests a close correspondence between Don Carlos and the screenplay for Star Wars (1977).

Additionally, the play is regarded as an influence on "The Grand Inquisitor" passage from The Brothers Karamazov.

== Opera adaptations ==
Several operas have been composed on the basis of the play:

- 1844 opera by Michael Costa (libretto Leopold Tarentini, London)
- 1847 opera by Pasquale Bona (libretto Giorgio Giacchetti, Milan)
- 1850 opera by Antonio Buzzolla (libretto Francesco Maria Piave, Venice) (this version was entitled "Elisabetta di Valois")
- 1862 opera by Vincenzo Moscuzza (libretto Leopold Tarentini, Naples)
- 1867 & 1884 Don Carlos and Don Carlo by Giuseppe Verdi (libretto Joseph Méry & Camille du Locle, Paris, Italian translation by Achille de Lauzières and Angelo Zanardini, Milan; German translation by Julius Kapp and Kurt Soldan)

== English translations and stage adaptations ==
- Don Carlos, Prince Royal of Spain: An Historical Drama from the German of Frederick Schiller (PDF). London: W. Miller. 1798.
- Boylan, R. D. (2007). Don Carlos. DoDo Press. ISBN 978-1-4065-3895-3. Reprint of an 1872 translation.
- Sy-Quia, Hilary Collier; Oswald, Peter (2008). Don Carlos and Mary Stuart. Oxford University Press. ISBN 978-0-19-954074-7. Reprint of a 1996 translation (out-of-print).
- Poulton, Mike (2005). Don Carlos. Nick Hern Books. ISBN 978-1-85459-857-8. Poulton's adaptation was directed by Michael Grandage in a well-reviewed staging.
- MacDonald, Robert David (2006). Schiller: Volume Two: Don Carlos, Mary Stuart. Oberon Books. ISBN 978-1-84002-619-1. MacDonald's adaptation was first staged in Edinburgh in 1995. It is a verse translation in iambic pentameter; Mary Carole McCauley wrote, "MacDonald creates a sense of ease within his 10-syllable metric lines by using modern idioms, and what the translation lacks in a certain lush richness, it may make up for in accessibility."

== See also ==
- Cultural depictions of Philip II of Spain
