= Barbara Giuranna =

Italian pianist and composer

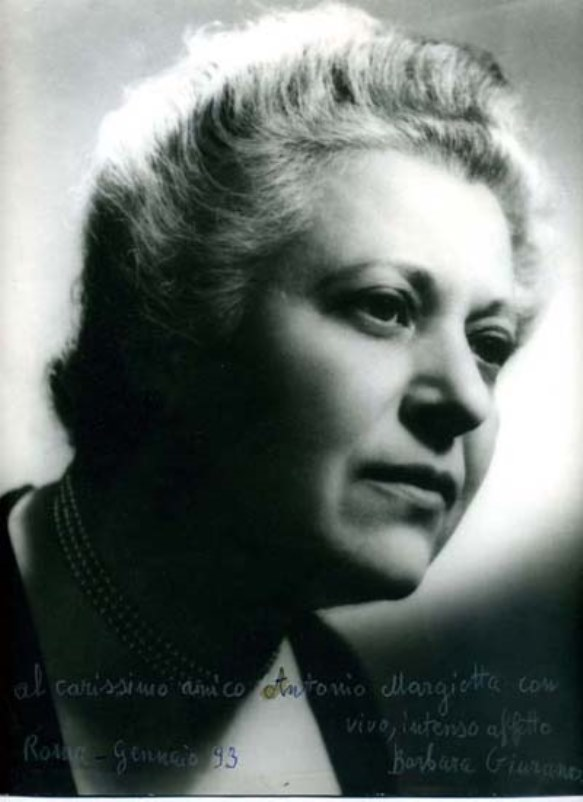
- Born: Elena Barbara; 18 November 1899; Palermo, Italy
- Died: 30 July 1998 (aged 98); Rome, Lazio, Italy
- Occupations: Composer; pianist

Elena Barbara Giuranna (18 November 1899 – 30 July 1998) was an Italian pianist and composer. She taught at the Rome Conservatory from 1937 until 1970, and also edited 18th-century music. She composed works for stage, orchestra, chamber ensemble and piano, and arranged the works of Paisiello, Vivaldi, and Cimarosa. She was an elected member of the Accademia Nazionale di Santa Cecilia.

== Life ==
Elena Francesca Paola Maria Giuseppa Barbera was born in Palermo, Italy and studied piano at the Palermo Conservatory with Guido Alberto Fano. She also studied composition at the Naples Conservatory with Camillo De Nardis and Antonio Savasta. She continued her education in composition at the Milan Conservatory with Giorgio Federico Ghedini. She made her piano debut in 1923, playing with the Naples Symphony Orchestra. In 1924 she married conductor Mario Giuranna.

After completing her studies, Giuranna taught at the Rome Conservatory from 1937 to 1970 and worked as an editor of 18th-century music. She was a music consultant to RAI in Rome from 1948 to 1956, and she was elected a member of the Accademia Nazionale di Santa Cecilia in 1982. She won the international prize of the City of Trieste for a concerto in 1967, and in 1990 a concert was given in her honour by the International Leonard Bernstein Academy.

She died in Rome.

== Works ==
Giuranna composed works for stage, orchestra, chamber ensemble, chorus, violin, and piano. Giuranna also published arrangements of 18th-century music including Paisiello, Vivaldi, and Cimarosa. Selected works include:

=== Theatrical works ===
- La trappola d’oro (ballet), 1929
- Jamanto (op, 3, Giuranna), opera 1941
- Mayerling (op, 3, V. Viviani), Naples, S Carlo, 1960
- Hosanna (op, 1, C. Pinelli), Palermo, Massimo, 1978 Choral: 3 cori, male chorus, 1940

=== Other works ===
- 3 canti alla Vergine, Soprano voice, female chorus, small orchestra, 1949
- Missa sinite parvulos, children's chorus, harp, organ, 1992
- Notturno, 1923
- Apina rapita dai nani della montagna, (tr. "Apina kidnapped by the mountain dwarves") suite after A. France, small orchestra, 1924
- Marionette, 1927
- X legio (Tenth Legion), Poema eroico per grande orchestra/Heroic Poem for Large orchestra, 1936
- Toccata for orchestra, 1937
- Patria 1938
- Concerto for orchestra no.1, 1942
- Episodi, wind, brass, timpani, piano, 1942
- Concerto for orchestra no.2, 1965
- Musica per Olivia, for small orchestra, 1970
- Adagio e Allegro da concerto, 9 instruments, 1935
- Sonatina, piano, 1935
- Toccata, piano, 1937
- Sonatina, harp, 1941
- Solo per viola, 1982
