= Sollima =

Sollima (pronounced [ˈsɔllima]) is an Italian surname from Sicily. Notable people with the surname include:

- Eliodoro Sollima (1926–2000), Italian composer and pianist
- Giovanni Sollima (born 1962), Italian composer and cellist, son of Eliodoro
- Sergio Sollima (1921–2015), Italian film director and playwright
- Stefano Sollima (born 1966), Italian film director and screenwriter, son of Sergio
