= Fiumara (surname) =

Fiumara is an Italian surname. Notable people with the surname include:

- Gianfranco Pappalardo Fiumara (born 1978), Italian pianist
- Tino Fiumara (1941–2010), American mobster
