= Pietro Platania =

Italian composer and music educator

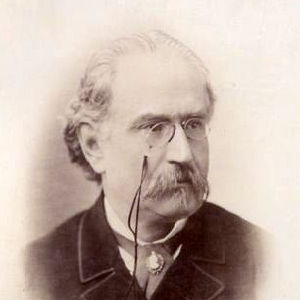
Pietro Platania

Pietro Platania (5 April 1828 – 26 April 1907) was an Italian composer and music educator.

Platania was born at Catania and was a student of Pietro Raimondi at the Palermo Conservatory. Beginning in 1882, he was the maestro di cappella of Milan Cathedral, and from 1885 to 1902, he served as the director of the Naples Conservatory. As a composer, he was known for his orchestral and church music. He was considered by Gioacchino Rossini and Giuseppe Verdi, among others, to be the greatest master of counterpoint of his day; the latter invited him to contribute to the Messa per Rossini, for which he wrote the Sanctus. He died in Naples.
