= Ginger Costa-Jackson =

American opera singer

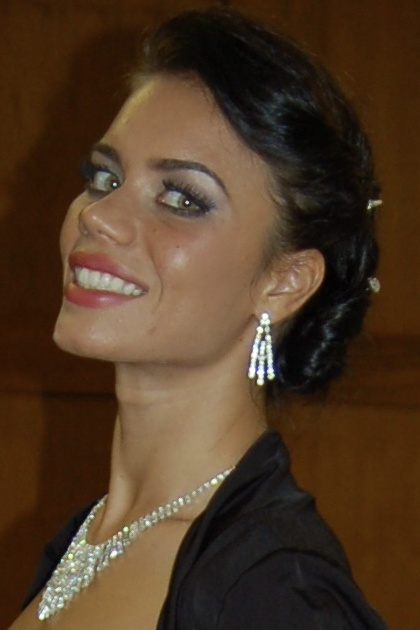
- Costa-Jackson in 2012

Background information
- Born: Ginger Emilia Jackson; September 10, 1986 (age 40); Palermo, Sicily, Italy
- Genre: Opera
- Occupations: musician, operatic mezzo-soprano
- Instrument: Vocals
- Years active: 2007–present
- Website: www.gingercostajackson.com

Ginger Costa-Jackson (born 10 September 1986, and named Ginger Emilia Jackson) is an Italian-American operatic mezzo-soprano who performs often with the Metropolitan Opera since entering its Lindemann Young Artist Development Program in 2007. The Met: Live in HD global broadcasts feature her frequently, as do other major theaters and concert venues worldwide. Costa-Jackson has performed in her native Italian as well as English, French, and Spanish; she speaks these languages fluently, along with limited German. While her signature role is Carmen, Costa-Jackson also performs comic roles, as in her Marchesa di Poggio (Glimmerglass Festival's 2013 adaptation of Verdi's King for a Day /Un giorno di regno), and also her 2009 Celia in Gilbert and Sullivan's Iolanthe with the San Francisco Symphony.

== Early life and education ==
Ginger Costa-Jackson was born in Palermo, Italy, to an American father, Walt Jackson, and an Italian mother, Emilia Costa. Relocated to Las Vegas, Nevada, the couple had two more daughters (also opera singers): Marina and Miriam. Italian was the children's mother tongue. The family then moved to Salt Lake City, Utah.

Music was a consistent part of Costa-Jackson's early family life. Her maternal grandmother, Lucia Frontini Costa, taught the children Italian lullabies and folk tunes. Emilia, like her mother before her, had a strong singing voice, although neither sang professionally. As a youth, Emilia had piano training at the Palermo Conservatory, and some private voice lessons. Walt sang in high school and college groups, including Brigham Young University's barbershop quartet. Each of the children took up orchestral instruments as part of their public school education. Costa-Jackson chose the violin, and eventually became first violinist in her school orchestra.

Miriam was the first of the Jackson children to study voice. Her interest sprang from listening to the family's opera CDs, especially The Three Tenors. Costa-Jackson's interests were more academic. She had a perfect record of top grades in school, and thought of becoming a professor of English Literature. When Costa-Jackson heard her sister was singing after beginning lessons, Costa-Jackson determined to study voice as well. However, Costa-Jackson found her voice cracked during lessons. This did not deter her from the decision to study voice.

In 2003, the family took all three daughters to Palermo, where Costa-Jackson and her youngest sister studied privately with Maria Argento Rancatore. The teacher insisted Costa-Jackson see a doctor to ensure her vocal problem was not a medical condition. She received a clear bill of health, and lessons began in earnest. Costa-Jackson then auditioned for a place with the Conservatorio Vincenzo Bellini, and gained entrance there. When the family returned to Utah after five months, Costa-Jackson and Miriam were invited to audition for the Utah Festival Opera. General Director Michael Ballam contracted them to sing for the 2004 season, and they became the youngest opera singers to be hired by the company (ages 17 and 15 respectively).

At 17, Costa-Jackson left public school and went to Italy to live with her aunt and continue private vocal studies. Costa-Jackson completed her high school education via correspondence courses. At 18 she attended one semester at Brigham Young University, but found it suited her better to focus on music, rather than pursue a liberal arts education. Therefore, she returned to Italy. At 19 she began a tour of Italian singing competitions. She won first place in her first competition—the 2006 Leoncavallo Festival International Competition in Montalto Uffugo. Later, as a finalist in the Ottavio Ziino International Lyric Competition (Concorso Lirico Internazionale "Ottavio Ziino"), Costa-Jackson met Lenore Rosenberg, who was a judge on that occasion, and the Director of the Lindemann Young Artist Development Program at the Metropolitan Opera. Rosenberg invited Costa-Jackson to audition for James Levine, which resulted in Costa-Jackson's becoming a Met Young Artist in 2007.

== Career ==
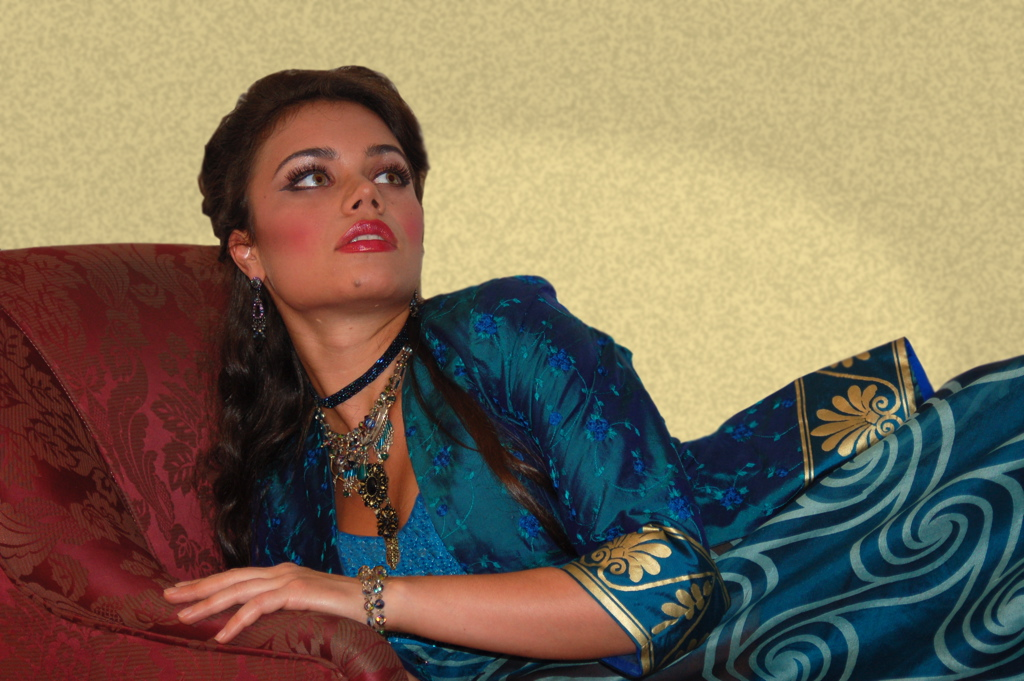
Ginger Costa-Jackson in her 2008 Metropolitan Opera debut as Myrtale in Thaïs

The 2007 jump from private student to the Lindemann Young Artist Development Program was the pivotal point in Costa-Jackson's career. The young singer had no degree, nor had she participated in the Metropolitan Opera National Council Auditions. Being a young artist gave her access to the Met's considerable resources, world-class teachers and coaches, and on-stage experiences.

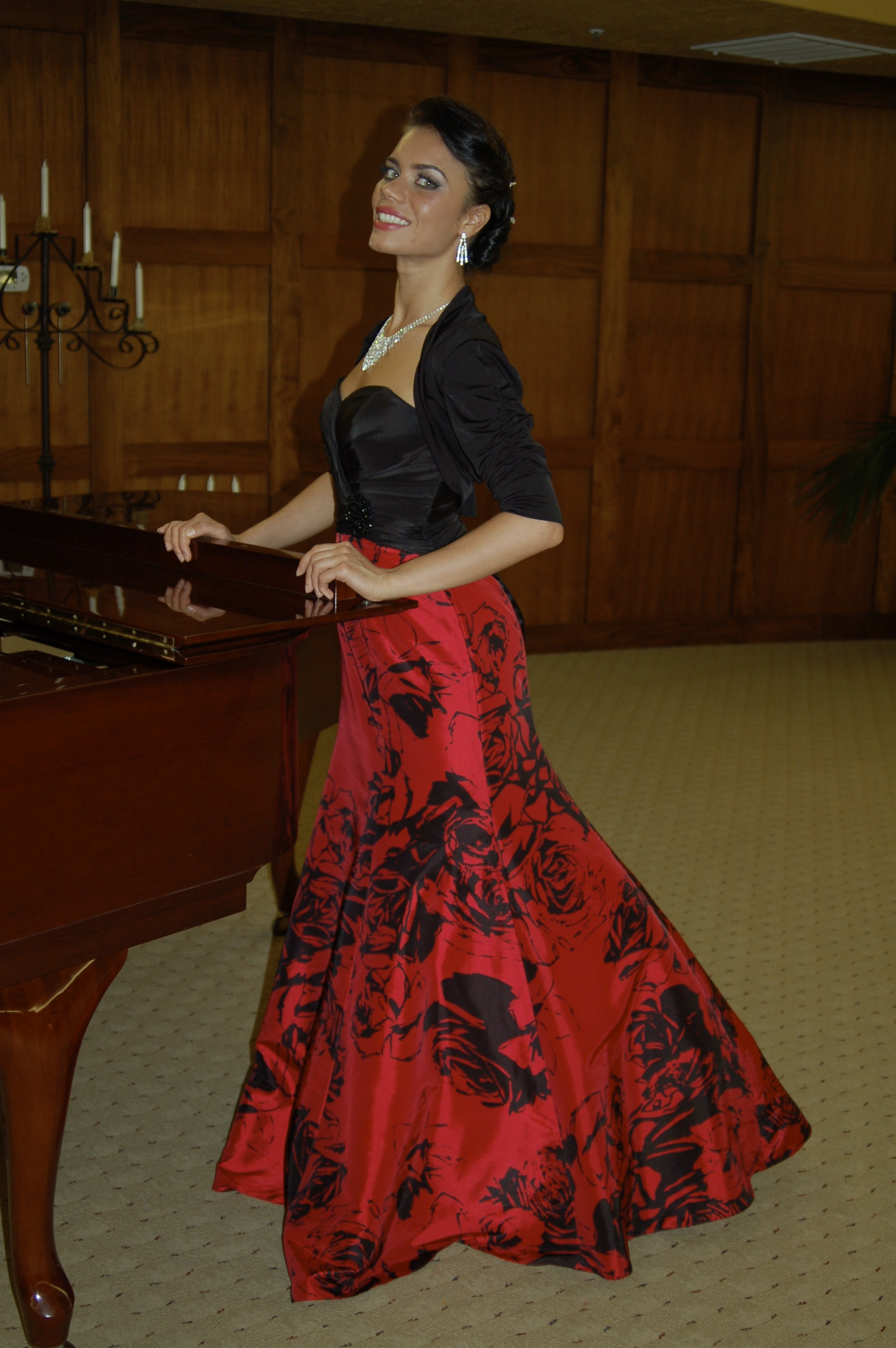
Costa-Jackson at a benefit concert appearance in St. George, Utah in 2012

Costa-Jackson made her first appearance with the Metropolitan Opera in its 2008 Opening Night Gala as Rosette in Massenet's Manon. Her singing debut came that same year in a new production of Massenet's Thaïs, which starred Renée Fleming and Thomas Hampson. Costa-Jackson was Myrtale. From 2008 to 2013, Costa-Jackson had 15 contracts with the Metropolitan Opera (see Repertory below). General Manager Peter Gelb explained how the Met's young artists are typically assigned small roles with the company. The company develops young artists, often giving them cover assignments before launching them into main roles. This pattern is evident in Costa-Jackson's placement in increasingly demanding cover roles since she graduated from the Lindemann Young Artist Development Program in 2010. Her 2012 and 2013 cover roles included Cherubino (Le nozze di Figaro), Meg Page (Falstaff), and Dorabella (Così fan tutte). Her debut in the title role of Carmen came in 2011 with Glimmerglass Opera, when Francesca Zambello cast Costa-Jackson as the gypsy temptress. Scheduling conflicts required Costa-Jackson to turn down offers to sing Carmen with Opera Hong Kong and Opera Hamilton in Canada. The Met released her from a contract to sing Bersi in Andrea Chénier, so that Costa-Jackson could sing Carmen with Virginia Opera in 2014. Carmen became her signature role and she has performed it all over the world. By March 2019 she had performed it thirteen times, in venues ranging from Seattle and San Diego to Mexico City and Tokyo.

2012 saw Costa-Jackson's debut with San Francisco Opera in the role of Nancy T'ang (Nixon in China), a role she had previously sung under the baton of the composer, John Adams, at the Met. Costa-Jackson's first professional role in Europe was Lola (Mascagni's Cavalleria rusticana) with the Gran Teatre del Liceu in 2011. She was "Puss" in the 2010 U.S. premiere of Montsalvage's El gato con botas produced by the Gotham Chamber Opera. Costa-Jackson sang Wowkle in the 2010 Metropolitan Opera centennial production of Puccini's La fanciulla del West.

== Personal life ==
Costa-Jackson married Spencer Burk M.D. on August 31, 2013. The couple live in Sarasota, Florida.

== Repertory ==
Year	Role	Composer	Opera	Location
2005	Idamante	Wolfgang Amadeus Mozart	Idomeneo	Brigham Young University
2006	Dame Quickly	Giuseppe Verdi	Falstaff	International Institute of Vocal Arts
2006	Sesto	Wolfgang Amadeus Mozart	La clemenza di Tito	International Institute of Vocal Arts
2006	Nerone	Claudio Monteverdi	L'incoronazione di Poppea	International Institute of Vocal Arts
2007	The Secretary	Gian Carlo Menotti	The Consul	Metropolitan Opera: LYADP
2007	La Voix	Jacques Offenbach	Les contes d'Hoffmann	Metropolitan Opera: LYADP
2008	Dorabella	Wolfgang Amadeus Mozart	Così fan tutte	Verbier Festival Academy
2008	Rosette	Jules Massenet	Manon Opening Night Gala, HD	Metropolitan Opera
2008	Annio	Wolfgang Amadeus Mozart	La clemenza di Tito	Metropolitan Opera
2008	Cherubino	Wolfgang Amadeus Mozart	Le nozze di Figaro	Metropolitan Opera: LYADP
2008	Myrtale	Jules Massenet	Thaïs HD	Metropolitan Opera
2009	Lola	Pietro Mascagni	Cavalleria rusticana	Metropolitan Opera
2009	Celia & Iolanthe (cover)	Gilbert and Sullivan	Iolanthe	San Francisco Symphony
2009	Cherubino (cover)	Wolfgang Amadeus Mozart	Le nozze di Figaro	Metropolitan Opera
2010	Maddalena	Giuseppe Verdi	Rigoletto	Metropolitan Opera: LYADP
2010	Eine Theatergarderobiere / Der Gymnasiast / Ein Groom	Alban Berg	Lulu	Metropolitan Opera
2010	El Gato ("Puss")	Xavier Montsalvatge	El gato con botas U.S. Premiere	Gotham Chamber Opera
2010	Wowkle	Giacomo Puccini	La fanciulla del West Centennial, HD	Metropolitan Opera
2011	Nancy T'ang, First Secretary	John Adams	Nixon in China Met debut, HD	Metropolitan Opera
2011	Lola	Pietro Mascagni	Cavalleria rusticana	Gran Teatre del Liceu (European debut)
2011	Marie	Gioachino Rossini	Moïse et Pharaon	Collegiate Chorale at Carnegie Hall
2011	Carmen	Georges Bizet	Carmen	Glimmerglass Festival
2012	Smeton (cover)	Gaetano Donizetti	Anna Bolena	Metropolitan Opera
2012	Rosette	Jules Massenet	Manon HD	Metropolitan Opera
2012	Nancy T'ang, First Secretary	John Adams	Nixon in China	San Francisco Opera
2012	Cherubino (cover)	Wolfgang Amadeus Mozart	Le nozze di Figaro	Metropolitan Opera
2012	Ascagne (cover)	Hector Berlioz	Les Troyens	Metropolitan Opera
2012	Mercédès	Georges Bizet	Carmen	Metropolitan Opera
2013	Smaragdi	Riccardo Zandonai	Francesca da Rimini HD	Metropolitan Opera
2013	La Marchesa di Poggio	Giuseppe Verdi	King for a Day / Un giorno di regno	Glimmerglass Festival
2013	Dorabella (cover)	Wolfgang Amadeus Mozart	Così fan tutte	Metropolitan Opera
2013	Carmen	Georges Bizet	Carmen	Tri-Cities Opera Company
2013	Meg Page (cover)	Giuseppe Verdi	Falstaff	Metropolitan Opera
2014	Carmen	Georges Bizet	Carmen	Virginia Opera
2016	Carmen	Georges Bizet	Carmen	Opera del Palacio de Bellas Artes, Mexico City
2016	Carmen	Georges Bizet	Carmen	San Francisco Opera
2017	Despina	Wolfgang Amadeus Mozart	Così fan tutte	Opéra Garnier, Paris
2018	Dorabella	Wolfgang Amadeus Mozart	Così fan tutte	Seattle Opera
2019	Carmen	Georges Bizet	Carmen	San Diego Opera
2019	Carmen	Georges Bizet	Carmen	Seattle Opera
2019	Cinderella	Gioachino Rossini	Cinderella	Seattle Opera
2023	Carmen	Georges Bizet	Carmen	English National Opera
2024	Carmen	Georges Bizet	Carmen	Opéra Royal de Wallonie

LYADP – Lindeman Young Artist Development Program; HD – The Met: Live in HD series

== Filmography ==
- Massenet: Manon in The Metropolitan Opera's 2008 Opening Night Gala, Decca ... Rosette
- Massenet: Thaïs Decca ... Myrtale
- Puccini: La fanciulla del West Decca ... Wowkle
- Adams: Nixon in China Nonesuch ... Nancy T'sang

== Recognition ==
- Lotte Lenya Competition, Kurt Weill Foundation, New York, 2009, 2013
- Loren L. Zachary Society National Vocal Competition for Young Opera Singers, Los Angeles, 2009
- Gerda Lissner International Vocal Competition, New York, 2009
- Opera Index Vocal Competition, New York, 2008
- Licia Albanese-Puccini Foundation International Vocal Competition, New York, 2008
- Verbier Festival Academy Scholarship, Switzerland, 2008
- Italian Cultural Society of Washington, D.C., Ruggiero Morigi Artist Award, 2004, 2005, 2008
- Festival d'Aix-en-Provence Scholarship, France, 2007
- International Competition Voci Nuove della Lirica G. B. Velluti, Mira-Venice, Italy, 2006
- Leoncavallo Festival, Montalto Uffugo, Italy, 2006

== Sources ==
- Nelson, Glen; illustrations by Annie Poon. Mormons at the Met. Paperback ed. Mormon Artists Group, 2012. ISBN 978-0615719429
- "Her rise in opera world started with lackluster music lesson" article by Doug Robinson, Deseret News
- "The Exclusive Opera Lively Interview with Ginger Costa-Jackson" article by Luiz Gazzola, Opera Lively
