= Palermo Conservatory =

Italian music school

Coordinates: 38°07′17″N 13°21′51″E

The Conservatorio di Musica Alessandro Scarlatti (English: Conservatory of Music Alessandro Scarlatti), better known in English as the Palermo Conservatory, is a music conservatory in Palermo, Italy. One of the oldest music schools in Italy, the organization was originally established as an orphanage for boys known as the Orfanotrofio del Buon Pastore in 1618. Music instruction began at the school in the late 17th century, and for a limited period music was the primary emphasis of the school when it was known as the Conservatorio dei giovanetti dispersi (English: Conservatory of missing youths). It evolved into a liberal arts college, known as the Collegio dei giovanetti dispersi, with an emphasis on literature and writing during the first half of the 18th century. In 1747 an emphasis on music resumed, and not long after the school was renamed the Collegio musicale del Buon Pastore. It operated under that name until 1915 when the school's name was changed to the Conservatorio di Musica Vincenzo Bellini. In 2018, the school's name was changed once again in honor of the composer Alessandro Scarlatti.

== History ==
The Palermo Conservatory was originally founded in 1618 as the Orfanotrofio del Buon Pastore; an orphanage for boys located within the Chiesa di Maria Santissima Annunziata. The idea and the funds for the school were provided by Francisco Ruiz de Castro, the Viceroy of Sicily. At the end of the seventeenth century, musical instruction was introduced at the orphanage that was modeled after the Naples Conservatory, and not long after the school was renamed the Conservatorio dei giovanetti dispersi (English: Conservatory of missing youths) when administration of the school was given over to the Government of Palermo.

In the first half of the 18th century (1721) the school's focus shifted away from music to a broader liberal arts education with studies in literature and writing being emphasized over that of music; with the school being renamed the Collegio dei giovanetti dispersi. However, in 1747 a gradual shift back towards a music emphasis began, and not long after the school became completely devoted to music instruction and was renamed the Collegio musicale del Buon Pastore. Composer Nicola Logroscino was maestro di cappella at the conservatory from 1758 to 1764. Composer Gaetano Donizetti taught on the faculty during his time in Palermo in the mid-1820s.

In 1833, Baron Pietro Pisani raised a large sum of money for the school which significantly improved the school's resources and quality of its instruction; including the building of a theatre on the conservatory's property and the purchasing of new music and instruments. At this time the composer Pietro Raimondi became director of the institution, and the conservatory underwent a period of significant growth under his leadership which lasted until 1852. The school struggled following Raimondi's departure, and by 1863 the conservatory had been taken over by the administration of the Government of Italy in order to prevent the school from closing. The school thrived once again after Pietro Platania was appointed director of the conservatory by a committee led by Giovanni Pacini in 1863. He was succeeded by Gaetano Vanneschi.

Composer and conductor Guglielmo Zuelli served as director of the Palermo Conservatory from 1895 through 1912. In 1915, the conservatory was renamed from Collegio musicale del Buon Pastore to the Conservatorio di Musica Vincenzo Bellini after the opera composer of that name. Composer, pianist and conductor Rito Selvaggi was director of the conservatory from 1938 through 1943. The conservatory's library was destroyed by bombing during World War II, and the school's music librarian and professor of music history Nino Pirrotta achieved acclaim for his work restoring the library after this incident. In 2018, the school was renamed after the composer Allesandro Scarlatti.

== Notable alumni ==
- Aura Eternal, drag queen
- Simone Alaimo, bass-baritone
- Nazario Carlo Bellandi, composer, pianist, organist, and harpsichordist
- Pasquale Bona, composer
- Salvatore Bonafede, composer and pianist
- Francesco Buzzurro, guitarist
- Fausto Cannone, singer-songwriter
- Ginger Costa-Jackson, mezzo-soprano
- Francesco Paolo Frontini, composer and musicologist
- Alfonso Gibilaro, pianist, vocal coach, and composer
- Barbara Giuranna, pianist and composer
- Anton Guadagno, conductor
- Matteo Mancuso, guitarist
- Gino Marinuzzi, conductor and composer
- Giuseppe Monterosso, flautist, composer, and conductor
- Giuseppe Mulè, composer and conductor
- Salvatore Pappalardo, composer
- Domenico Picciché, pianist, composer, and jurist
- Giovanni Sollima, composer and cellist
- Ottavio Ziino, composer and conductor

== Notable faculty ==
- Marco Betta (also alumnus), composer
- Beniamino Cesi, pianist
- Francesco Cilea, composer
- Gaetano Donizetti, composer
- Guido Alberto Fano, pianist and composer
- Alberto Favara (also alumnus), musicologist
- Pietro Floridia, composer
- Riccardo Minasi, violinist and conductor
- Federico Mompellio, musicologist, music editor, music librarian, and music critic
- Enrico Onofri, violinist and conductor
- Gianfranco Pappalardo Fiumara, pianist
- Mario Pilati, composer
- Nino Pirrotta (also alumnus), musicologist, pianist, and music critic
- Pietro Raimondi, composer
- Antonio Scontrino (also alumnus), composer
- Rito Selvaggi, composer, pianist, conductor, and poet
- Guglielmo Zuelli, composer and conductor
