= Carrettieri =

1949 melody by Alfonso Gibilaro

Carrettieri is a melody in the Sicilian language composed by Alfonso Gibilaro and included in No. 3 of the compendium entitled Quatro miniature Siciliane. It was published in London in April 1949 by Francis, Day & Hunter Ltd. then recorded the following month for His Master's Voice by tenor Beniamino Gigli.

Carrettieri
Calatu è già lu suli intra lu mari
Si stancu bestia mia, e iu ti cantu
Li roti chianu chianu fa girari
A casa tu mi porti ed iu ti cantu
Lu suli è na bruciatu tuttu u giornu
Lu pruvulu na suffucatu ma 'ntornu
Scattare là paglia fa lu me pani
E lavemu accuminciari arré dumani
lavemu accumenciare are dumani
amuninni. amuninni..

The cart driver
The sun has already set on the sea
You're tired, my beast, and so am I
The wheels you turn slowly, slowly
You take me home so to you I sing
The sun scorched us all day long
The dust suffocated us but I don't turn around
Hauling stuff I earn my bread
We start all over again tomorrow
start again tomorrow
let's go let's go home
