= Giuseppe Monterosso =

Italian flautist, composer, conductor and music teacher

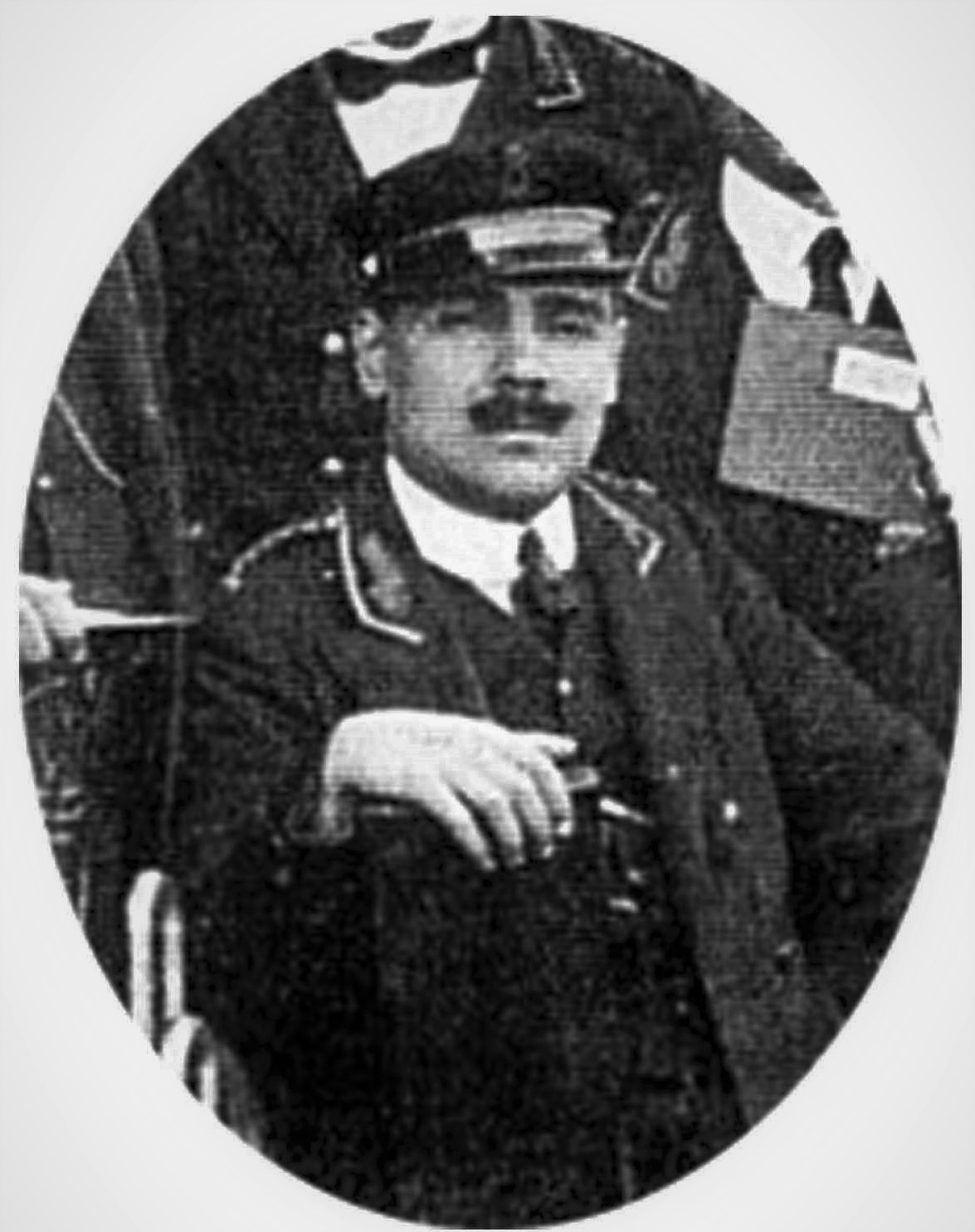
Giuseppe Monterosso in Acireale, 1903

Giuseppe Monterosso (15 October 1866 – 21 December 1947) was an Italian flautist, composer, conductor and music teacher.

Amateur recording of "Le Premier Amour" (1889), grand waltz by Giuseppe Monterosso (1866–1947). Philharmonic concert "Gaetano Miraglia", directed by Maestro Salvo Miraglia – Acireale, 19 August 2020

An author of music for wind orchestra, Monterosso dedicated himself to evolving the taste and style of the Cantata da Chiesa (or sacred). Between the nineteenth and twentieth centuries in central-southern Italy, he brought compositional solutions decidedly closer to the genre of opera into the Cantata as did the Italian-Slovene musician, Aurelio Dončič (1867–1944), his contemporary and friend. Together with Dončič in Malta, Monterosso also promoted the reform of the instrumental staff of musical bands.

== Biography ==
=== Adolescence ===
Giuseppe Monterosso was born to Domenico, a shoemaker, and Maria Lo Dico, a housewife. Monterosso had five other brothers, Luigi, Alfonso, Salvatore, Antonio and Eduardo. He hardly ever attended them due to his profession. In fact, he was always very far from home. He only worked as a musician: in the "Levy Lists" of the "Mandamento" (military district) of Girgenti. Initially, he was a "musician", while, after enlisting, he was a "corporal-musician". Other conscripts, listed together with him, are listed with additional professions, such as "bricklayer-musician", or "tailor-musician". The fact that "Giuseppe, as a child and adolescent, did not touch a piece of leather, did not hammer a nail, did not resole a shoe" caused a crack in relations with his father, Domenico. Therefore, in 1872, Giuseppe secretly frequented the premises of the Banda di Canicattì, located in a house on the ground floor, owned by the sac. Giacinto Gangitano di Vincenzo, at the Piano degli Agonizzanti, not far from where he lived. He was assigned the piccolo that was lent to him by the Band Commission and began to study music and participate in the concertation of the pieces.

=== Music study and diploma ===
Approaching music at an early age, he studied and played in the Banda di Canicattì between 1872 and 1886 with masters Giuseppe Montelepre, Eugenio Pellegrini and Edoardo Piacentini, who taught him to play the piccolo flute, the transverse flute and initiated him into the study of harmony. He was fully trained in composition and band instrumentation with the conductor Giovanni Tarditi (1857–1935), and head of music in the Italian Army headquarters.

Between 1892 and 1893 he graduated from the Palermo Conservatory in flute, composition, band instrumentation and orchestra conducting.

=== Travels around Italy ===
Monterosso worked as a musician in Pisa (1886–1888), Livorno (1888–1892), Palermo (1892–1895), Livorno (March 1895 – February 1899), Acireale (1899–1908), Aci Catena (1908–1912), and then after moving to Malta in Floriana (1912–1914), Valletta (occasionally between 1911 and 1912 and permanently between 1914 and 1919), Birgu (1914–1922), and then back to Sicily again in Aci Catena (1922–1945). Between 1886 and 1899 he played the flute in the Presidiary Band of the 37th Infantry Regiment Livorno Brigade, as a soloist and musical arranger.

When Monterosso arrived in Livorno in 1889, he had become a private teacher of Gemma Renucci (1870–1923), who had long since begun to study the flute. Gemma's father, Alceste and his brothers were entrepreneurs of shipyards, trade and import. They married in 1895. From the marriage four children were born, three in Italy between 1897 and 1905 and one in Malta.

In Acireale, Monterosso played the flute in the Bellini Theater Orchestra and in the historic Cappella Reale di Santa Venera, from 1899 to 1908 he was vice maestro (substitute conductor) of the Municipal Band, directed by maestro Aurelio Dončič, his sincere friend. Until 1902, Dončič had him called to perform also in the orchestras of other theaters in Catania, when he conducted at the National, at the Politeama Arena Pacini, at the Bellini (in Catania) at the Sangiorgi. In 1907 he founded the Banda di Aci Catena.

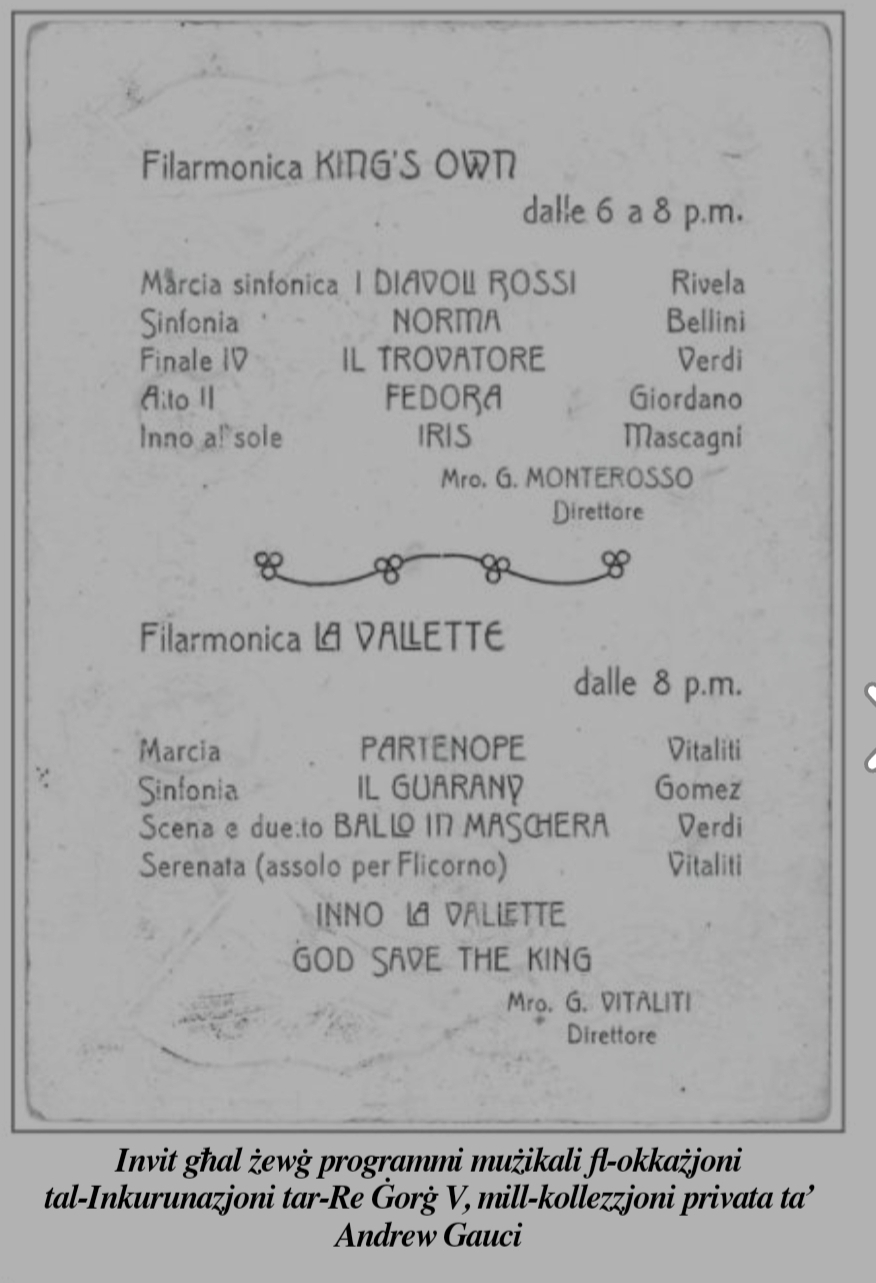
Concert program for the coronation of King George V, Giuseppe Monterosso conducts the King's Own Band – Valletta (Malta, 22.06.1911)

== Time in Malta (1911–1922) ==
=== King's Own Band (1911–1912) ===
In 1912, Monterosso was offered the chance to be vice-master and substitute conductor of the Society of the King's Own Band of Valletta. During this period he directed the program of the Musical Concert in honor of the coronation of King George V of the United Kingdom held on 22 June 1911 in St George's Square in Valletta.

=== Vilhena Band (1912–1914) ===
In 1912 Monterosso was invited to direct the Soċjetà Filarmonika Vilhena of Floriana. He arrived in Malta in the first half of March to take up his duties, succeeding Alfred P. Hare. With the Vilhena, Monterosso normally took part in the patronal feasts of Floriana but also of the cities, towns and hamlets of the island. He performed a double musical concert in Sliema, one in the Church and one outdoors, in Via Santa Maria, on 22 and 23 June 1912, for the Feast of the Sacred Heart. Again with the Soċjetà Filarmonika Vilhena he held a concert on the occasion of the closing of the XXIV International Eucharistic Congress in the presence of cardinal Domenico Ferrata, papal legate, held in Malta from 23 to 27 April 1913, at the Piazza di San Publiu in Floriana, interpreting a repertoire composed of works by Xuereb, Bugeja, Verdi, Stradella and Donizetti.

On 18 May 1913, the Vilhena Band of Monterosso took turns on the stage with the King's Own Band ("Banda Ufficiale del Re") directed by maestro Aurelio Dončič, in the Argotti Garden in Floriana, for a fundraiser to be donated to the assisted by the Vilhena Society charity. On that occasion, the inhabitants of Floriana competed with the Vessillo Patrio march by Nerik Xuereb and the Omaggio ai Florianesi, that Monterosso had written in a few months, immediately after his arrival in the suburb of Floriana. At the end of the evening, the two musical ensembles gave voice to the English anthem God Save the King. During the celebrations desired by Pius X for the "XVI Centenary of the peace and freedom of the Church", Giuseppe Monterosso conducted the Vilhena Band twice, on 13 and 14 September 1913. The Vilhena performed on 17 February 1914 in the Giardino Argotti during the celebrations for the 25th anniversary of the appointment of Pietro Pace as bishop of Malta.

=== Direction of the Prince Of Wales Band (1914–1922) and King's Own Band (1914–1919) ===
Monterosso was appointed in December 1913 to head the Prince Of Wales band of Birgu. Subsequently in March 1914, Monterosso definitively closed the contract with the Vilhena Society, completing all commitments with this band, then officially debuted with the Prince on 19 April 1914.

Between 1914 and 1919 Monterosso was hired to conduct also the King's Own Band due to the internment of Aurelio Dončič in the Maltese prisoner-of-war camp of Cottonera. During the war, Monterosso therefore simultaneously assumed the direction of the Prince of Wales and King's Own bands.

On 1 November 1921, Monterosso conducted a concert to celebrate the arrival of Edward, Prince of Wales in Malta, accompanied by Prince George, Duke of York. The next day Edward awarded the band with his order.

== Return to Italy and death ==
=== In Aci Catena (1922) ===
After returning to Aci Catena in July 1922, Monterosso took charge of the direction of the Citizen Philharmonic Concert until 1945. He died on 21 December 1947, after conducting his Cantata per Santa Lucia for the last time, on 13 December.

=== Legacy ===
On 5 July 2021, a plaque commemorating Giuseppe Monterosso and his wife Gemma Renucci was placed in the burial chapel under the patronage of the Archconfraternity of the Blessed Sacrament "al Turno".

On 6 January 2023, in the presence of the Mayors of Aci Catena, and Canicattì, an imposing commemorative inscription of Monterosso was inaugurated and unveiled in the façade of the house where he had lived in via Palestra 9, Aci Catena.

== Musical works ==
=== Compositions ===
- Le premier amour. Waltz, for Great Band, Livorno, 1889.
- Ricordi Militari (Military Memories). March with Fanfare. Acireale, 1900. (commissioned and directed by Aurelio Doncich on 1-4-1900 in Piazza Duomo)
- Gemma ("Gem"). Mazurka for Medium Band. Acireale, around 1902.
- "Ci Salvò" ("He Saved Us"). Aci Catena, 1909. (Hymn in the form of a Cantata)
- Fior Tricolore (Tricolor Flower). Serenade for Great Band. Valletta, 1911.
- Omaggio ai Florianesi (Tribute to the Florianesi). Floriana (Malta), 1912.
- To the glorious V. and Martyr Saint Lucia. Cantata for Mixed Voice Choir and Media Band. Aci Catena, 1922.

– Contains: "Dai Fulgidi Vanni Risorge l'aurora" (hymn).

- "Hymn to V. and M. Saint Lucia. Cantata-Hymn for unison choir and media band. Aci Catena, 1934.

– Contains: "The soft dawn appears on the bright horizon" (hymn).

=== Musical transcription and instrumentation for wind orchestra ===
There are numerous transcriptions (instruments, arrangements, reductions/adaptations for wind orchestra ensembles) of the great classics of operatic music between the 19th and 20th centuries elaborated by Monterosso. Among these are:

- "Pluie de diamants" ("diamond rain"). Waltz Op. 160 by Charles Émile Lévy Waldteufel
- "La Berceuse" (waltz lullaby, Op. 161 by Charles Émile Lévy Waldteufel
- Sulle rive del Ionio ("On the shores of the Ionian"). Waltz for large band by Venerando Scandurra
- Confidenze ("Confidences"). Mazurka, originally for piano, then for accordion (1887), by Giuseppe Capitani
- Naomi. Serenade by Mario Russo (entirely instrumented for band by Monterosso).

== Sources ==
Archives for consulting unpublished documents:

- Historical Archive of the Municipality of Canicattì (AG), at "Palazzo Stella" (Italy) and Archive of the Demographic Office of the Municipality of Canicattì (AG) in the ex Monastery "Badia" – Borgalino.
- Historical Archive of the Mother Church, San Pancrazio – Canicattì (AG) (Italy).
- State Archive of Agrigento (Italy)
- Municipal Historical Archive of Acireale (CT). Website.
- Civic Archive-Library of the "Carlo Schmidl" Theater Museum – Trieste (Italy)
- Archive of the "Vilhena Philharmonic Society" (Floriana, Malta).
- Archive oh the "Prince of Wales Own Philharmonic Society" (Birgu, Malta).
- Archive of the King's Own Band Philharmonic Society (Valletta, Malta).
- Archive of the "Philharmonic Society Saint Mary, King’s George V Band" (Mqabba, Malta).

== Bibliography ==
- Il Concerto King’s Own in Piazza, at "Il Malta" (31-7-1916), at the "Archivio King's Own Band"- La vallette (MT).
- Nigel Holland, L-istorja tas-Socjeta' Filarmonika Vilhena, Floriana, edited by Vilhena Band, 15 July 2006, at the Archive of the "Vilhena Philharmonic Society" Floriana (MT), pp. 35 e p. 71 and passim.
- Emanuel Busuttil-Dougal, "L-Ghaqda Filarmonika Prince of Wales Own A.D. 1891 – Il-Birgu". Festi solenni San Duminku ta' Guzman, il-Birgu, at the Archive of the Prince of Wales Own Philharmonic Society, Birgu (MT), Kommunita Dumnikana tal-Knisja tal-Lunzjata, 2016, p. 33, and passim.
- Borg Grech, Ir-Re George V – 105 snin mill-Inkurunazzjoni, at "Festa titulari ta' Santa Maria L–Imqabba", Mqabba, Soċjetà Santa Marija Banda Re Ġorġ V, 2016, at the Archive of the "Philharmonic Society Saint Mary, King’s George V Band – Mqabba (MT)", pp. 184–185 and passim.
- Luca Bianchini e Anna Trombetta, Mozart. La caduta degli Dei. Musica, Persone, 2 Voll., Tricase. Youcanprint self-publishing, 2016/2017.
- Dante Cerilli, Sinopie Consonanze. Giuseppe Monterosso e il Filarmonico Concerto Municipale di Aci Catena.1908–1912 ¤ 1922–1945. Dal Meriggio al Tramonto (1948–1978). I maestri Fontana, Minissale e Ausino (Supino, Pagine lepine, 2022, pp. 25–30 and passim).
- *Lapis ipse loquax. Giuseppe Monterosso e Aci Catena protesi nella Musica. Atti del Convegno tenutosi allo Svelamento della Targa Marmorea del 6.1.2023, edited by Fabrizio Càssaro, Supino (FR), Pagine lepine, 2023, p. 4, 31 and passim.
