= Pasquale Bona =

Italian composer (1808–1878)

Pasquale Bona (3 November 1808, Cerignola – 2 December 1878, Milan) was an Italian composer. He studied music at the Palermo Conservatory. He composed a number of operas, including one based on the Schiller play that would later inspire Giuseppe Verdi's Don Carlos. Bona later taught at the Conservatory in Milan, where he counted among his pupils Amilcare Ponchielli, Arrigo Boito, Franco Faccio and Alfredo Catalani; he was also friends with Alessandro Manzoni.

== Operas ==
- Il Tutore e il Diavolo, libretto by Giovanni Schmidt (1832)
- I Luna e i Perollo, libretto by Giacomo Sacchero (1844)
- Don Carlo, libretto by Giorgio Giachetti (1847)
- Il Gladiatore, libretto by Francesco Guidi (1849)
- Vittoria, madre degli eserciti, libretto by Marco Marcelliano Marcello (1863)
