= Mario Pilati =

Italian composer

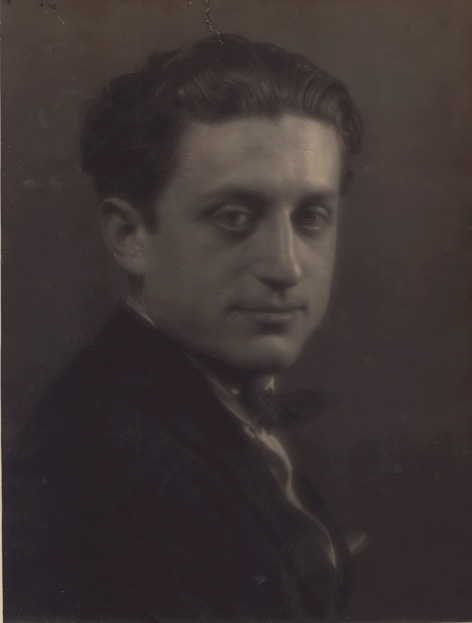
Mario Pilati

Mario Pilati (2 June 1903 – 10 December 1938) was an Italian composer.

Pilati was born in Naples, and his natural musical talent showed itself when he was very young. He entered the Conservatorio di Musica San Pietro a Majella at the age of fifteen, studying under Antonio Savasta. In 1925, on the advice of Ildebrando Pizzetti, he went to Milan, where he worked as a teacher, music critic and an arranger of vocal scores for Casa Ricordi until 1930, when he moved back to Naples to take up a professorship at the conservatory where he had been a student. In 1933 he accepted a post at the Palermo Conservatory, returning to Naples in 1938, where he became ill and died just before the outbreak of World War II.

== Works ==
Pilati's output is considerable given his few years of compositional maturity, and includes a Concerto for Orchestra (1932), premiered by Dimitri Mitropoulos at the Venice Biennale in 1938, which shows modal influences of Respighi as well as a Mahlerian ländler in the finale. Other compositions include a Suite for Strings and Piano of 1925 and several chamber works. At his death he was working on an opera, Piedigrotta, to a libretto in Neapolitan dialect. Only the first act was completed.

His work continued to be popular for some time after his death, but gradually waned until its rediscovery in the 1950s, when his long-lost Sonata per flauto e pianoforte was published for the first time. In 2001 the Swiss conductor Adriano released a series of Pilati's orchestral works, including the Concerto for Orchestra, with the Slovak Radio Symphony Orchestra and pianist Tomáš Nemec. on Marco Polo Records.

== Sources ==
- Adriano (2001). Liner notes to Naxos 8.570873.
