= Marina Costa-Jackson =

American opera singer

Marina Costa-Jackson (born August 24, 1987) is an American soprano. One of three daughters to Walt Jackson and Emilia Costa, her sisters, Miriam and Ginger Costa-Jackson, are also singers.

Born in Las Vegas, Nevada, Costa-Jackson was raised in Palermo, Italy. She studied voice privately with Ariel Bybee and briefly at Utah State University before entering the Academy of Vocal Arts (AVA) in Philadelphia. At the AVA she was a pupil of William Schuman and appeared in several of the school's opera productions; including appearances as Amelia in Verdi's Un Ballo in Maschera, Mimì in Puccini's La Bohème, Marguerite in Gounod's Faust, Fiora in L'amore dei tre re, and the title role in Iolanta.

Costa-Jackson has won several international singing competitions. In 2014 she won first prize at the Giulio Gari Foundation International Competition, received second place in the Marcello Giordani Foundation Vocal Competition, and was a finalist in the International Hans Gabor Belvedere Singing Competition. In 2015, she won both the Metropolitan Opera National Council Auditions and the Licia Albanese-Puccini Foundation International Vocal Competition. Also in 2015, she made her professional opera debut in 2015 as Musetta in La Bohème with the Michigan Opera Theatre. Later that year she performed the role of Leonora in Verdi's Il trovatore with Musica Viva in Hong Kong, and appeared in concert with Andrea Bocelli. In February 2016 she sang in a concert of Puccini's music with the Allentown Symphony Orchestra. In March 2016 she was the soprano soloist in Verdi's Requiem at the Municipal Theatre of Santiago. In 2017, she is scheduled to make her debut at the Welsh National Opera as Mimì.
