= King's Own Band =

Maltese musical band

The King's Own Band, founded in 1874 as La Stella, was a Maltese philharmonic band based in the country's capital, Valletta. The Band was renamed to La Nazionale, La Nazionale Vincitrice and later to The Prince of Wales Band in 1885.

The King's Own Band is the current name of the Band given its name by King Edward VII in 1901 upon advancing to the throne of the United Kingdom.

== Early history ==
The first Band Club, or philharmonic society as they were known, to be set up in Valletta, was known as La Nazionale due to their location in the capital city of Malta. Colloquially this band was and still is referred to as Ta' l-Istilla. The reason is that the promoters of this society had in mind their participation during the feast day of Saint Dominic in 1874, one of the patron saints who has his feast celebrated in Valletta, and the symbol of the saint is a star, Stilla in Maltese.

The band's name has changed multiple times due to the historical circumstances. The first name that was given to the band club was that of La Nazionale. This name immediately reflects the aim of the founders, that it would not only be the band club for the feast of St. Dominic, but also a national one as it was born in the capital city of Malta, Valletta to foster more appreciation for this type of music around the island. Its participation in the various localities of Malta was to confirm this commitment. The second name was that of La Nazionale Vincitrice, adding the appellation that it was victorious. This was given to the band club by its own admirers in order to recognise the achievements and successes that had been registered.

Another change in name occurred in 1885. The Prince of Wales, who had visited Malta three times during the 1860s, was asked to grant a new name to the band club, namely The Prince of Wales Band. This was to be retained till 1901 when the Prince was crowned the King of the British Empire. The committee made a formal request to have their name changed once more. From a letter dated 4 March 1901 the British Prime Minister communicated the decision to the Governor of Malta, Sir F. Grenfell. The band was to be officially known as King's Own Band.

This Royal connection of the band with the British monarchy was continued throughout the years. In 1903 the king paid an official visit to the islands, arriving in Malta on 16 April. The King's Own Band was invited to play in the Palace Square during that evening when a dinner was held in the Palace on the occasion of the Royal visitor. Later during the same visit, the King presented a banner to the Band Club inside the Palace. Unfortunately that same banner was destroyed during the Second World War when the club premises were hit during one of the aerial attacks. In 1954 the Governor of Malta presented another Royal standard in lieu of the lost one. While in 1967, during her visit to Malta, Her Majesty, Queen Elizabeth II presented another Royal Banner to the King's Own Band.

In 1936, The King's Own Band was the first local band club to play the National Anthem of Malta in public to commemorate the National Day, 8 September.

The King's Own Band Club served as an important social, political and musical club for many people. Being also situated in Valletta, it has always attracted particular attention from foreign visitors to the islands. Thus, when His Royal Highness Prince Philip, the Duke of Edinburgh, visited the club's premises on 28 November 1952, he stated :"I hope that this my visit to the King’s Own Band Club will be interpreted as if I had been to all the band clubs of Malta."

The King's Own Band still bears the title of Eccellenza (Excellence), a tribute to the high level that the band had achieved in Algiers (1912) while participating in the Grand Concours International de Musique.

== Later history ==
The band is composed of about 95 musicians. The band performs throughout the year, starting in March in preparation for the feast of St. Joseph in Rabat – Malta, through October/November in a grand finale in the form of the Annual Concert.

== The master directors ==
1. Giuseppi Borg 1874–1880
2. Filippo Galea 1880–1886
3. Ġiovanni Malfiggiani 1886–1888
4. Corrado Ronzani 1888–1890
5. Gaetano Grech 1890–1892
6. Alfred Porkiman Hare 1892–1908
7. Aurelio Doncich 1908–1914
8. Giuseppe Monterosso 1914–1919
9. Aurelio Doncich 1920–1930
10. Francesco Gobet 1932–1937
11. Giuseppe Casapinta 1938–1956
12. Anthony Aquilina 1956–1973
13. Carmelo Caruana 1973–2002
14. John Galea 2003 -
