= Stefano Donaudy =

Italian composer (1879–1925)

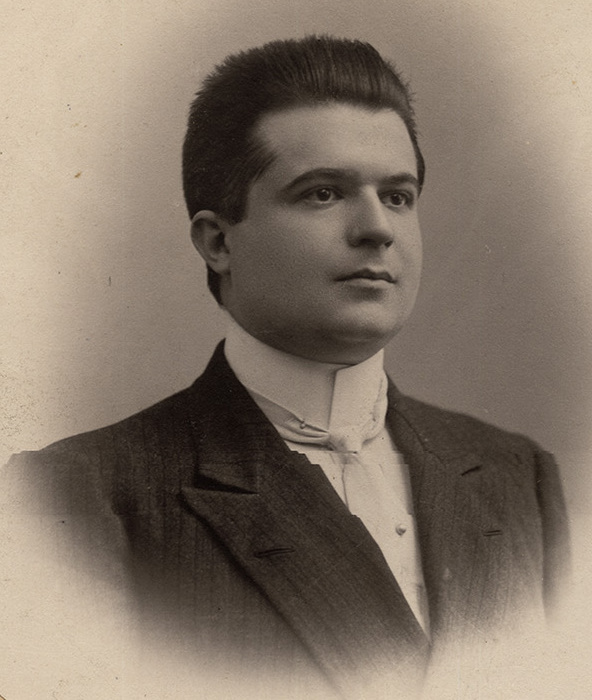
Stefano Donaudy, 1906

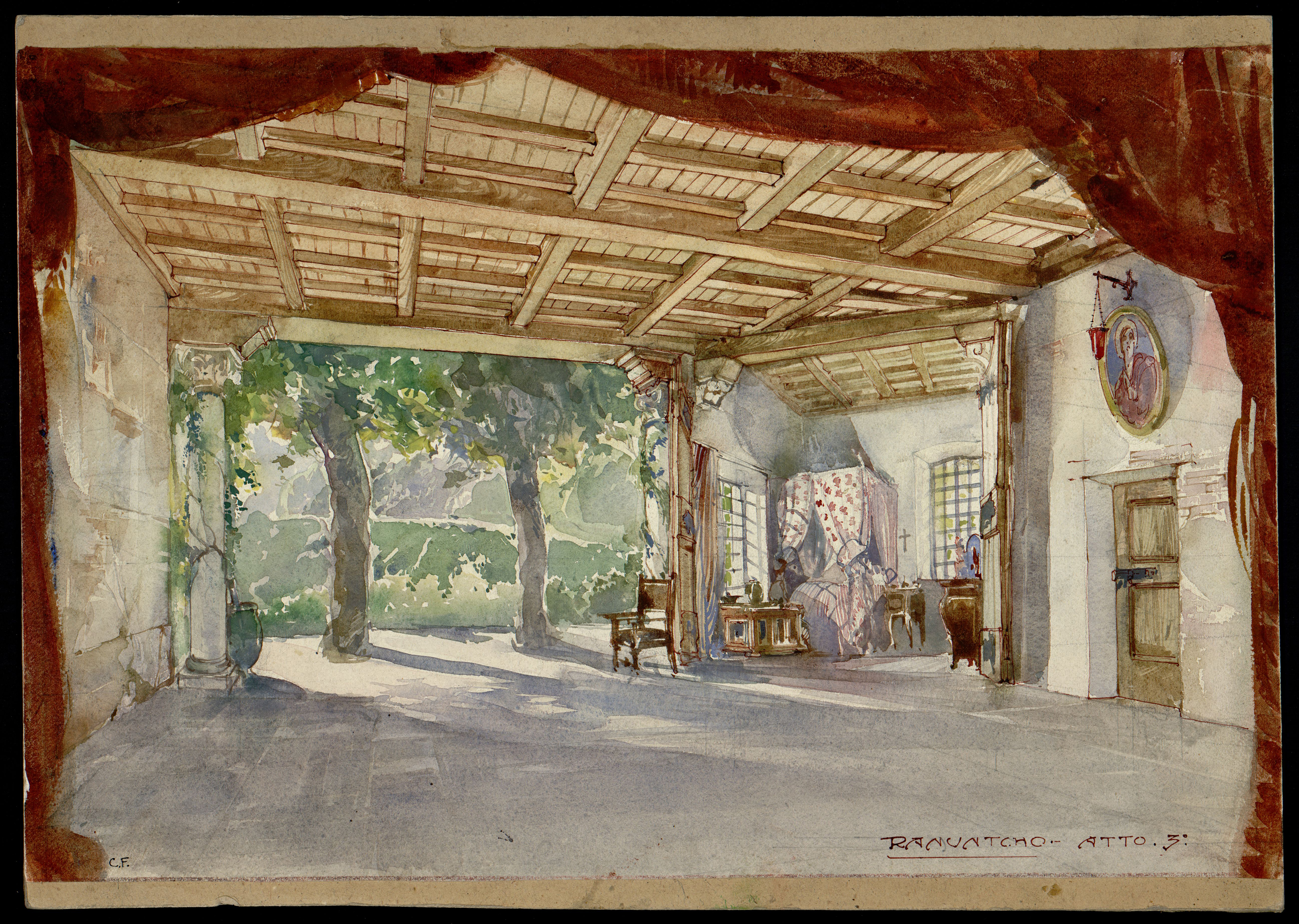
Franchita's room, set design for Ramuntcho act 3 (1921).

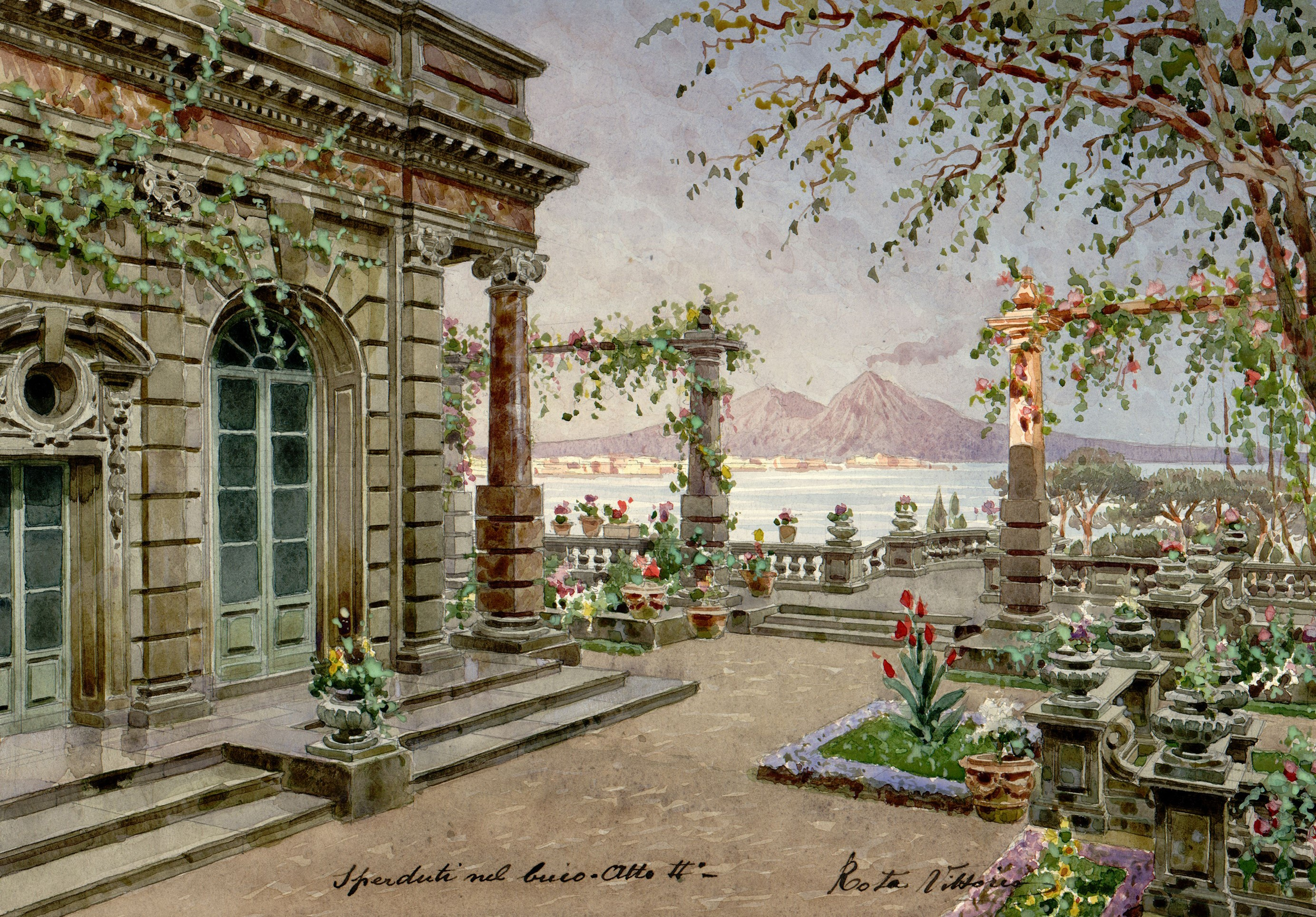
Una spianata nella villa del Duca di Vallenza, sul mar di Posillipo, set design for Speduti nel buio act 2 (1907).

Stefano Donaudy (February 21, 1879 – May 30, 1925) was an Italian composer. Born in Palermo to a French father and an Italian mother, he was active in the 1890s and early 20th century, at a time when Palermo enjoyed a period of relative splendour under the influx of rich Anglo-Sicilian families such as the Florios and Whitakers. A variety of sources date both his first opera Folchetto and one of his most popular songs, Vaghissima sembianza, to 1892, when he was only 13.

After studies with the director of Palermo's Conservatoire, Guglielmo Zuelli, Donaudy made a living as singing teacher, coach and accompanist for some of Sicily's wealthiest families, while actively pursuing a career as a composer. He wrote mostly vocal music, dividing his efforts between opera and song, though he also wrote chamber and orchestral music. Practically all his song texts and libretti were supplied by or written at four-hands with his brother, Alberto Donaudy.

Donaudy's most famous collection is 36 Arie di Stile Antico, first published by Casa Ricordi in 1918 with revisions in 1922, but using material composed from 1892 onward.

Donaudy's final opera was premiered at the Teatro di San Carlo in Naples on April 25, 1922: La Fiamminga was an unmitigated fiasco, and Donaudy was so hurt that he abandoned composition for the rest of his life. He died three years later, forty-six years old.

Even less information is available on the rest of his output, which seems to include a cantata Il sogno di Palisenda, written before 1902, one symphonic poem, several smaller works for orchestra and «a quartet of compositions» for violin and piano.
