= Antonio Scontrino =

Italian composer (1850–1922)

Antonio Scontrino (17 May 1850, Trapani – 7 January 1922, Florence) was an Italian composer.

Scontrino studied at the Palermo Conservatory from 1861 and 1870 and later in Munich. He began performing as a double bassist in 1891. In 1898, he became a professor of composition at the Palermo Conservatory and also taught in Florence afterwards. (Indeed, there are references to him as a teacher of counterpoint at the Florence Conservatory somewhat earlier, in 1897.)

He composed five operas (from 1879 to 1896), several large orchestral works (including symphonies), one concerto each for double bass, bassoon, and piano, four string quartets and a prelude and fugue for quartet, incidental music, pieces for piano, choral music, and lieder.

Scontrino's String Quartets are: E minor (Prelude and Fugue) 1895?; G minor in 4 movements, 1900; C major 4 movements, 1903; A minor 4 movements, 1905?; F major 4 movements, 1918?

The Conservatorio di Musica "Antonio Scontrino" in Trapani is named in his memory.

== Selected works ==
- Grande polonese
- Marcia trionfale
- Sinfonia marinesca
- Sinfonia romantica
- Preludio religioso
- Marion De Lorme
- Idillio di Sigfrido
- Pierre Gringoire
- La cortigiana
