= Giovanna (singer) =

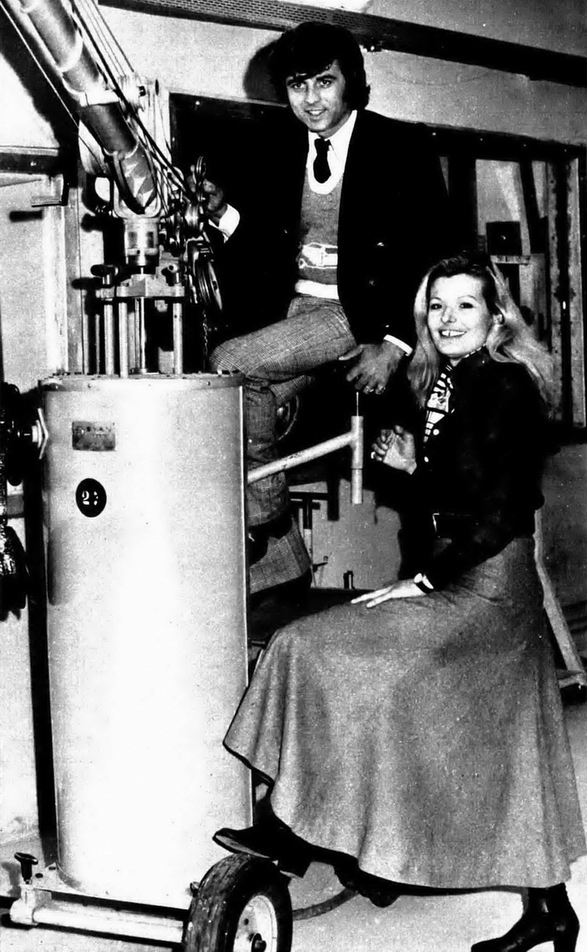
- Little Tony and Giovanna in Radiocorriere magazine, 1973.

Background information
- Born: Giovanna Nocetti; 10 March 1945 (age 81); Viareggio, Italy
- Occupation: Singer
- Years active: 1970–present

Giovanna Nocetti (born 10 March 1945), known mononymously as Giovanna, is an Italian singer, record producer and songwriter, mainly successful in the 1970s.

== Life and career ==
Born in Viareggio, Giovanna started playing the guitar during her high school years, and after a year at the university she eventually decided to abandon her studies and to move to Milan to pursue a music career. In 1967, she signed a contract with the label Meazzi, and the same year she recorded her first single, "Ricordi notturni", composed by her own.

Giovanna became first known in 1970, thanks to her participation to the RAI musical show Settevoci, and the same year she got her first hit, "Io non volevo dimenticare". In 1971 she released her first album, Una corsa pazza. In the late 1970s she passed to the label Ri-Fi, getting her major hit with the song "Il mio ex", written by Paolo Limiti and Roberto Carlos.

In 1982 Giovanna founded her own label, Kicco Records. In 1985 she composed a musical version of Ave Maria, which she also performed at the Sala Nervi in Vatican City in the presence of Pope John Paul II.

From the mid-1980s Giovanna focused her activity both as a singer and as a producer on rediscovering and reworking Italian classic songs.

== Discography ==
Album

- 1971: Una corsa pazza
- 1973: Ho passato un brutto inverno
- 1975: Una storia quasi vera
- 1980: Giò
- 1982: Giovanna
- 1983: Macchie d'amore
- 1984: ’Na sera 'e maggio
- 1985: Tentazioni
- 1987: La voce dell'amore
- 1990: Giò
- 1991: L'amante mia
- 1991: Vecchio frak
- 1993: Noi, fra un tango e una canzone
- 1994: Lega l'amore
- 1994: Giò - La donna che amo
- 1997: Giovanna canta Nino Rota
- 1999: Songs e melodies
- 2000: Le canzoni di Paolo Limiti
- 2008: The best of my life
- 2010: Il mio ex - Le canzoni di Paolo Limiti vol. 2
