= Guido Alberto Fano =

Italian composer

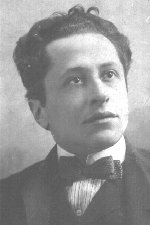
- Born: May 18, 1875; Padua
- Died: August 14, 1961 (aged 86); Spilimbergo
- Education: Diploma in Composition from the Liceo Musicale di Bologna (1897); degree in law from the Università di Bologna (1901)

Guido Alberto Fano (18 May 1875 in Padua – 14 August 1961 at Tauriano di Spilimbergo) was an Italian pianist and composer. From 1894 he was the favoured pupil of Giuseppe Martucci. In 1905 he was appointed director of the Parma Conservatory, and in 1916 he became director of the Palermo Conservatory. From 1922 he was professor of piano at the Milan Conservatory. Fano, who was of Jewish origin, was removed from this position by the Italian Fascist racial laws in 1938. He moved to Fossombrone and Assisi to survive the holocaust from 1943 to 1945. He returned to teaching 1945–47, then retired.

== Works, editions and recordings ==
- Canzoni. Sara Mingardo. 2011
