= Ottavio Ziino =

Italian composer, conductor and academic

- Ottavio Ziino (photo with 1957 dedication)
- Born: 11 November 1909; Palermo, Italy
- Died: 1 February 1995 (aged 85); Rome, Italy

Ottavio Ziino (11 November 1909 – 1 February 1995) was an Italian composer, conductor and academic.

== Life and career ==
Born in Palermo, Ziino graduated in composition from the Palermo Conservatory, and specialized at the Accademia Nazionale di Santa Cecilia in Rome. After having been a professor in his alma mater, between 1966 and 1980 he was director of the Palermo, Naples and Rome Conservatories. From 1959 to 1970 he also served as artistic director of the Sicilian Symphony Orchestra (Orchestra Sinfonica Siciliana, OSS).

As a composer, he is best known for his series of Concertos for solo instrument and orchestra and for Hymni Christiani in diem for soprano, baritone, choir and orchestra (1956). He also had an intense activity as a conductor.
