= Alfonso Gibilaro =

Italian composer (1888–1957)

- Born: 28 September 1888; Porto Empedocle, Sicily
- Died: 5 January 1957 (aged 68); Wandsworth, London
- Other names: Fofo, Fof
- Occupations: Pianist, composer
- Known for: "Ave Maria", "Carrettieri"
- Notable work: Four Sicilian Miniatures

Alfonso Vinzenzo Giuseppe Gibilaro (28 September 1888, Porto Empedocle, Sicily – 5 January 1957, Wandsworth, London) was a pianist, opera coach and composer. Two of his compositions—an Ave Maria and a Sicilian dialect song entitled "Carrettieri"—were popularized by the interpretation and sound recordings made by the Italian tenor Beniamino Gigli for His Master's Voice.

== Works ==
- Sicilian Wagoners. (Carrettieri) [Song.]. Musical score, text in Sicilian dialect (English version included), alternative title: Four Sicilian Miniatures, No 3. London: Francis, Day & Hunter Ltd. 27 April 1949. pp. 70. OCLC 497489166. EP36559.
- "Alfonso Gibilaro: 'Ave Maria'". Catalog of Copyright Entries. Copyright Office, Library of Congress. Vol. 7. Francis, Day & Hunter Ltd. August 1953. p. 597. EF0-2263253. "A setting for tenor or soprano solo with chorus, ad lib., score, with piano acc; includes part for optional chorus: TB or Smz"
- Fantasia on British Airs for oboe and strings, Oxford University Press
- Burlesque Serenade
- Menuet de la Poupie
- Rondo des Marionettes
