= Giuseppe Mulè =

Italian politician

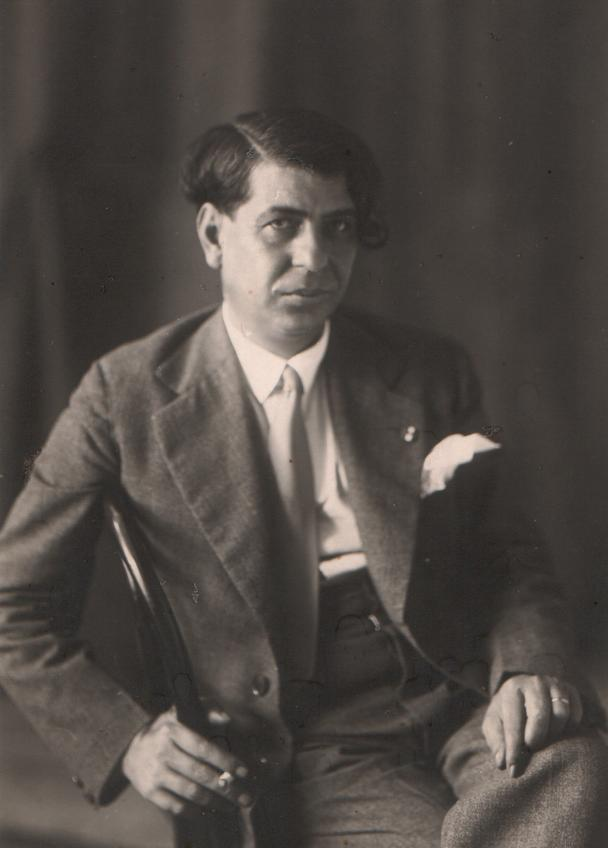
Giuseppe Mulè

Giuseppe Mulè (28 June 1885, Termini Imerese - 10 September 1951, Rome) was an Italian composer and conductor. His output includes numerous symphonic works and chamber works, incidental music for the stage, 7 operas, 5 film scores, and an oratorio. His work is characterized by its use of Italian folk melodies, verismo, and a tritone-inflected melodic style.

== Life and career ==
Mulè studied at the Vincenzo Bellini Conservatory in Palermo. In 1903, even before completing his academic studies, he composed a Largo for cello and piano that was used as an opening song in national radio broadcasts in Italy for RAI.

After graduating from the conservatory he pursued a career as a conductor in Italy, working with many of that nation's leading orchestras. He became the director of the Palermo Conservatory in 1922. He left there in 1925 to become the director of the Accademia Nazionale di Santa Cecilia, a post he held for 20 years. During the fascist era he was recognized for his talent for organization. He was made national secretary of the Sindicato del Musicisti, which he represented in parliament alongside composer Adriano Lualdi from 1929 on.

He retired in 1945 and lived in Rome until his death six years later. His son, Francesco Mulé, became a successful actor in Italy.

== Selected works ==
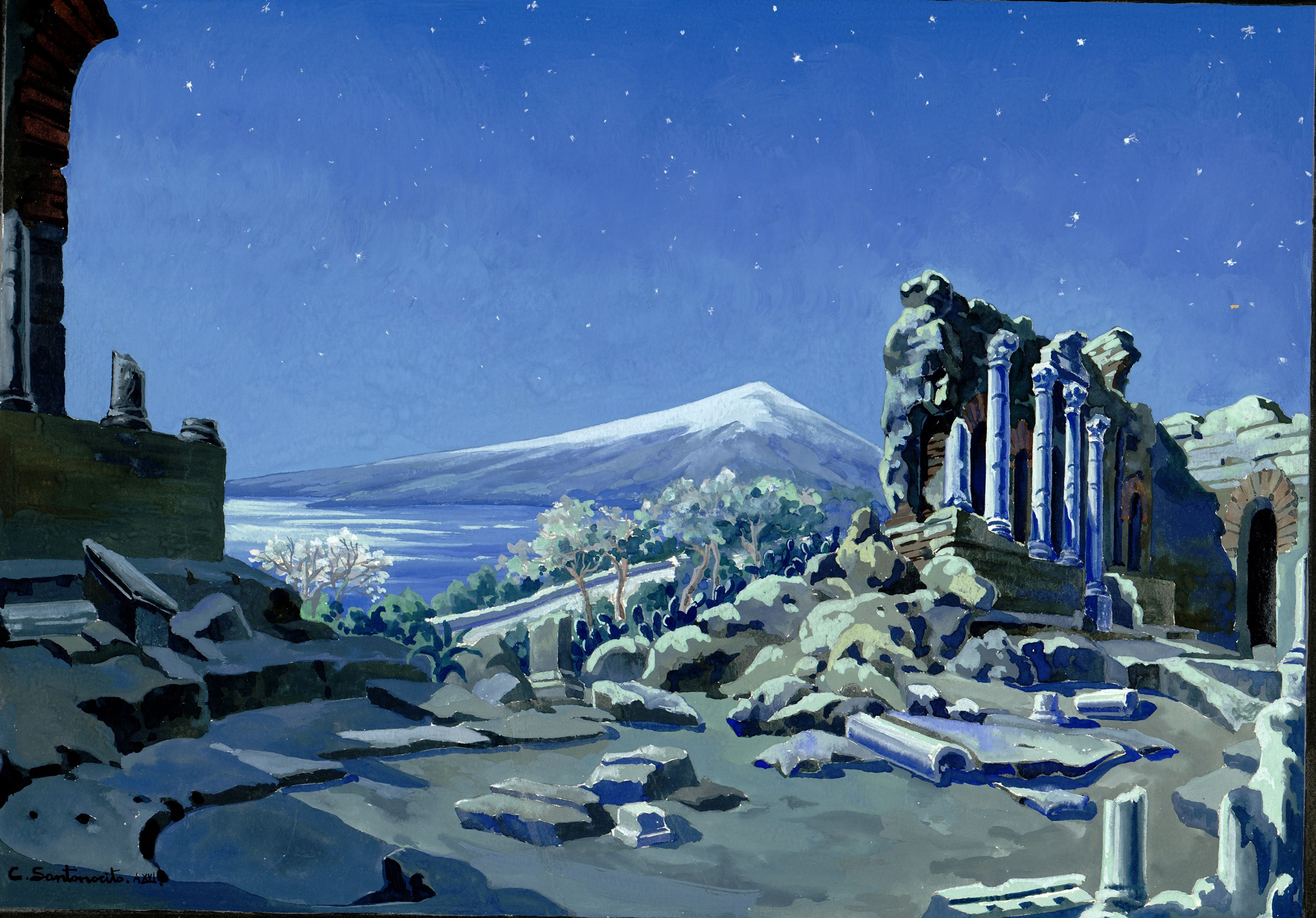
Paesaggio con resti archeologici, set design for Taormina (1937).

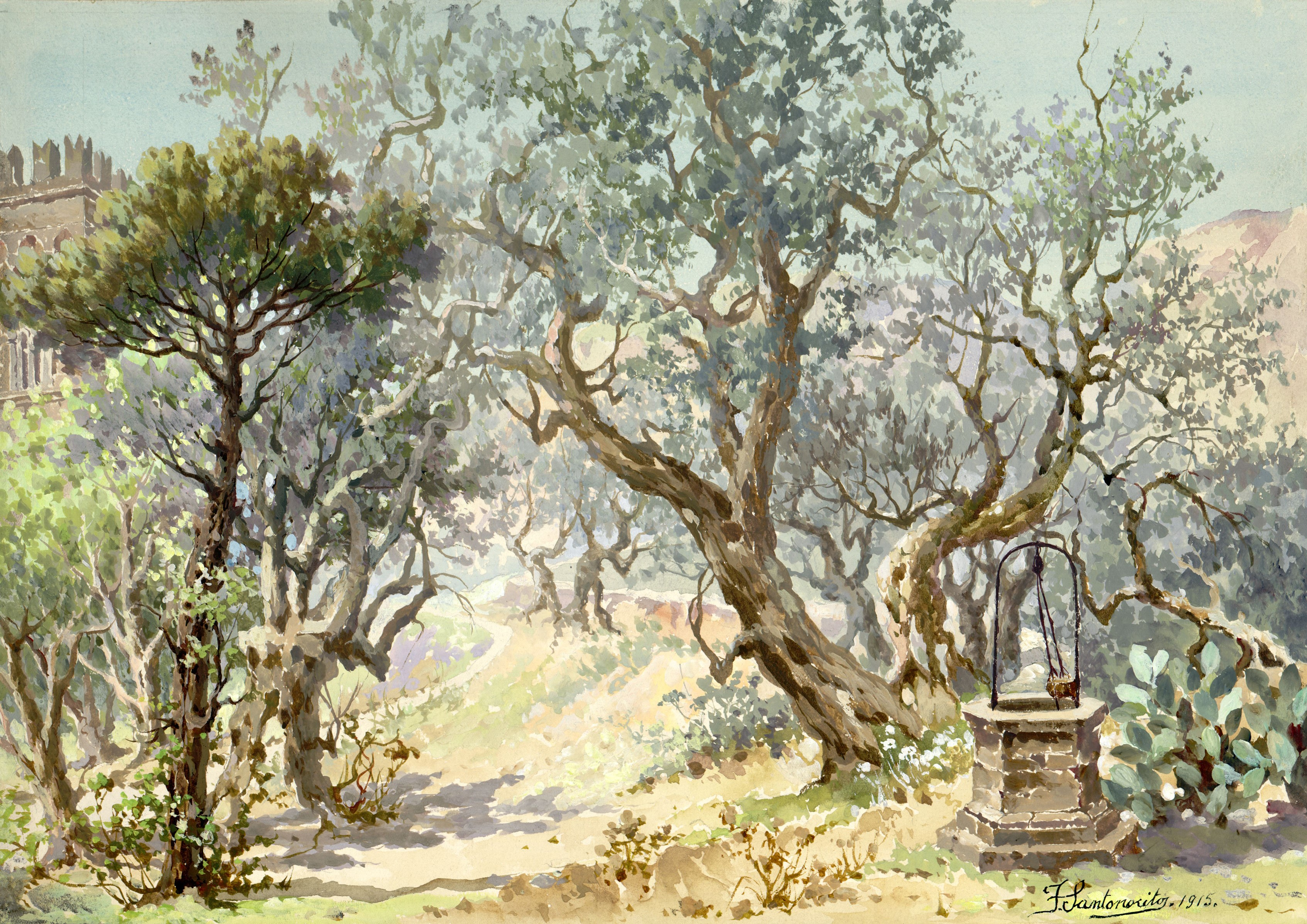
Pittoresco oliveto presso Borgetto, set design for Al lupo! act 1 (1915).

=== Operas ===
- La baronessa di Carini (1912)
- Al lupo! (1919)
- La monacella della fontana (1923).
- Dafni (1928)
- Liolà (1935)
- Taormina (1938)
- La zolfara (1939)

=== Orchestral Scores ===
- Sicilia canora (1924)
- La vendemmia, Symphonic Poem (1936)
- Tema con variazioni, for Cello and Orchestra (1940)

=== Film scores ===
- Lucrezia Borgia (1940)
