= Gianfranco Pappalardo Fiumara =

Italian musician (born 1978)

Gianfranco Pappalardo Fiumara (born July 2, 1978 in Catania, Sicily) is an Italian pianist, specializing in baroque performance.

== Career ==
Pappalardo Fiumara, he studied with Vincenzo Balzani, is a graduate from the Milan Conservatory. He perfected his Bach repertoire with Rosalyn Tureck. He performed as soloist at Carnegie Hall in New York City in 2006, at the Sala Giuseppe Verdi in Milan, at the Teatro Massimo Bellini in Catania, and the Palazzo del Quirinale in Rome.

He played monographic programs devoted to J.S. Bach at the Chapel of the Good Shepherd at Notre-Dame Basilica located in Montreal. at room Glenn Gould in Toronto, North Cyprus Bellapais Festival Nicosia and with orchestras including the Symphony Orchestra of Sicily, the orchestra of the Teatro Bellini in Catania, the Orchestre Philharmonique du Nouveau Monde in Montreal, the Philharmonic Bourgas Opera, the Chamber Orchestra of Ascoli Piceno, and with the Orchestra of the State Government of Mexico.

He is artistic director of The Etna In Scena in Zafferana Etnea, of the International Music Atelier of Catania, University of Enna Kore and professor at the Conservatory of Palermo where he holds the role of artistic coordinator.

He is the author of historical publications on W. A. Mozart and its relationship with freemasonry and the theory of music education in particular. He has recorded for RAI in Rome, and the Quebec National Radio.

== Discography ==
- Rossini's Petite messe solennelle, 2006;
- J.S Bach recital, RAI Roma, 2006–2011;
- Vincenzo Bellini and Giuseppe Verdi arie da camera, Panastudio Records, 2008
- J.S. Bach Goldberg Variations Bwv 988, Classic Voice, 2011
