= Pietro Raimondi =

Italian composer

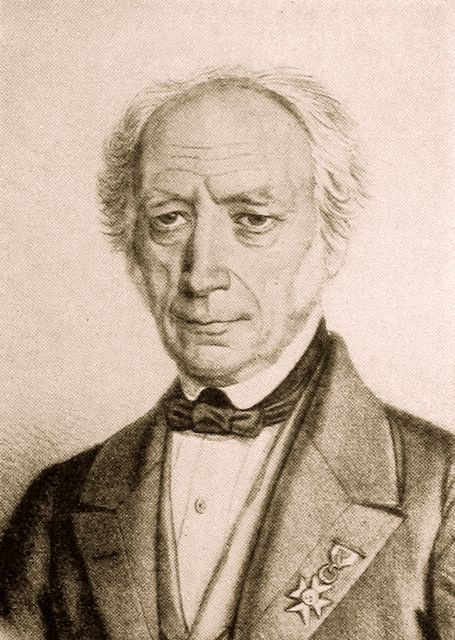
Pietro Raimondi

Pietro Raimondi (December 20, 1786, Rome – October 30, 1853) was an Italian composer, transitional between the Classical and Romantic eras. While he was famous at the time as a composer of operas and sacred music, he was also as an innovator in contrapuntal technique as well as in creation of gigantic musical simultaneities. He was the director of the Palermo Conservatory from 1833-1852.

Raimondi was born in Rome, and received his early education in Naples. He spent part of his early career in Genoa, and then in Sicily, where he had operas performed in Catania and Messina; however he moved back to Naples in 1820, and began a career as an opera composer there. While he was best known as an opera composer during this time, he was obsessed with counterpoint, and spent his spare time writing fugues for many voices, as well as simultaneous fugues in different keys and modes for multiple groups of different instruments. He considered this work to be experimental, and did not incorporate his experimentation, early in his career, into his operas.

Few of Raimondi's operas were successful, and as soon as he realized he was being eclipsed by Rossini, and later by Bellini and Donizetti, he changed his compositional direction from production of operas to sacred music; in that domain he had a better opportunity to indulge his love of counterpoint. He published a counterpoint treatise in 1836, around the same time as the first of his experimental compositions for multiple choruses and orchestras; from this year forward he devoted most of his energies to such creations. However he had not forgotten his previous career as an operatic composer, and made a few last attempts to achieve a success on the operatic stage.

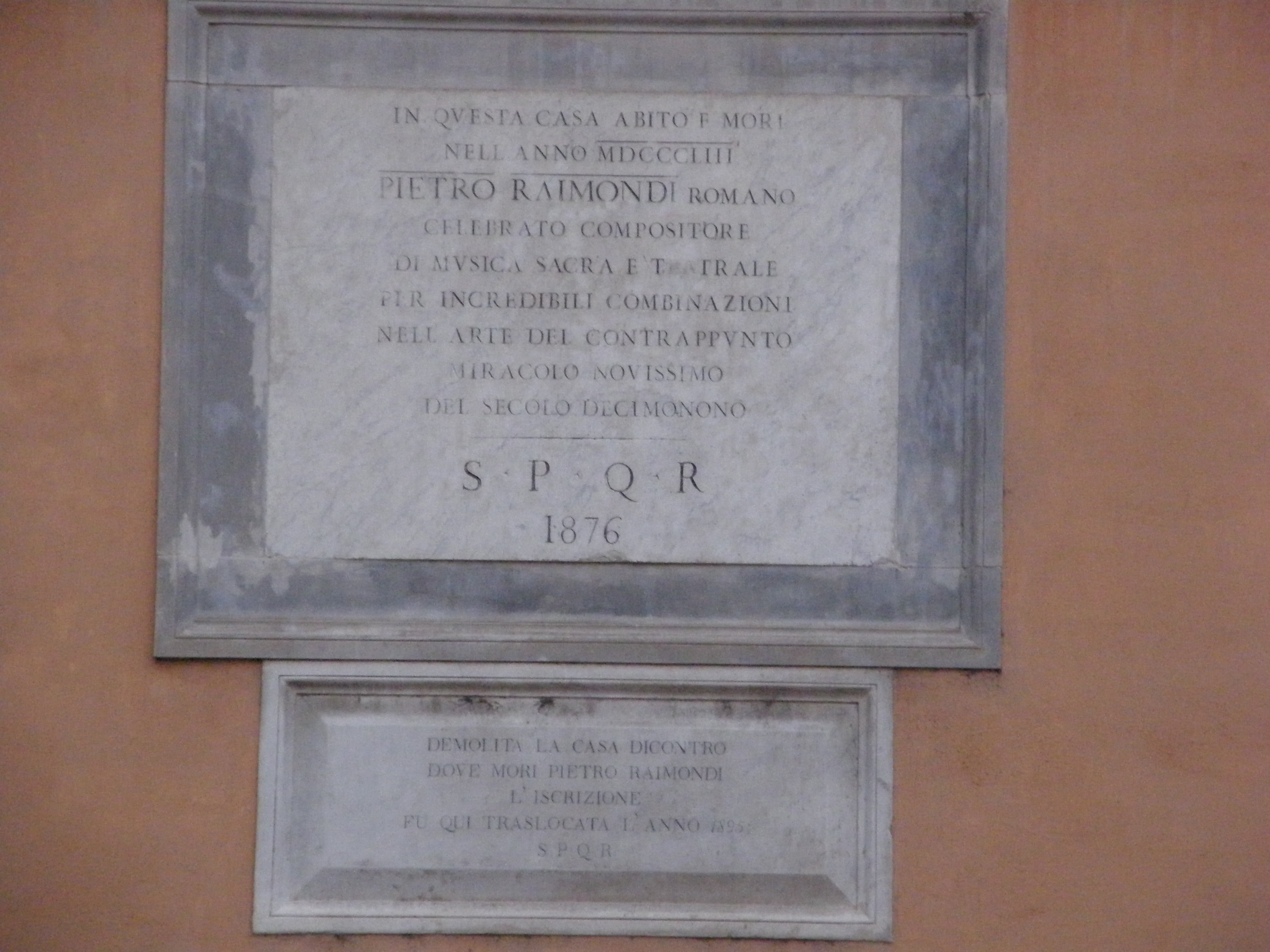
Commemorative plaque in Piazza dell'Oratorio, Rome

One of the most spectacular of his experiments in musical simultaneity was his triple oratorio, Putifar-Giuseppe-Giacobbe (1848). This work was a set of three independent oratorios designed to be performed first consecutively, and then simultaneously, one of the few such experiments before the music of Charles Ives in the twentieth century. Unlike the music of Ives, however, Raimondi's musical language was conservative, even anachronistic, using only the tonal language of the eighteenth century. The parts of the oratorios were designed to fit together tightly, all obeying the standard rules of counterpoint. The triple oratorio was first performed in Rome in 1852, in a concert lasting six hours, and requiring 430 performers. According to the contemporary account, Raimondi was so overcome with the colossal sound of the three oratorios together at the end that he fainted, and the concert caused the sensation he had desired for so long. As a result of this success he was honored by the Pope, receiving from him the position of maestro di cappella at St. Peter's, a level of acknowledgement he had never achieved in the operatic realm.

Raimondi followed the triple oratorio with the composition of a double opera, one serious and one comical, which like the triple oratorio was designed to be performed either consecutively or simultaneously. This work (Adelasia/I quattro rustici) was left incomplete at his death in 1853; however, much of the orchestration, counterpoint, and many of the scene changes had been worked out. As conceived, each opera would have served as a commentary on the other. This double opera has never been completed or staged, and along with Raimondi's other late music is an example of an experimental trend in the middle nineteenth century which was never followed up by anyone else.

In his actual musical language, Raimondi was conservative, and his simultaneities work by following traditional rules of counterpoint, as well as by staying in a limited tonal universe.

Raimondi makes a dramatic appearance in Michael Ayrton's satirical novel Tittivulus.
