= Julius Kapp =

German dramaturge and writer

Julius Kapp (1 October 1883 – 18 March 1962) was a German dramaturge and writer.

== Life ==
Kapp was born in Steinbach (today a district of Baden-Baden). After his doctorate Kapp published several books on Hector Berlioz, Franz Liszt, Carl Maria von Weber and Giacomo Meyerbeer (1920). He became known above all as editor of the writings of Richard Wagner. In the years 1921 to 1945 Kapp worked as dramaturge of the Berlin Staatsoper Unter den Linden and editor of the in-house papers of the Staatsoper. As a music writer he also made himself known with his great Wagner biography.

Since 1933 Kapp was a member of NSDAP. In 1937 he published a Geschichte der Berliner Oper, to which Hermann Göring wrote a preface.

Knapp also created adaptations. In Nazi Germany the opera Nabucco was undesirable because of the theme from the history of Israel. In 1940 Knapp created an Aryanized version in which he replaced the Israelites with Egyptians. In the choir Va, pensiero he replaced the Jordan with the Nile and Zion with Memphis.

This NS version Flieg, Gedanke, getragen von Sehnsucht with the text line Teure Heimat, wann seh ich dich wieder is still widespread today in sound recordings and on the Internet.

After the Second World War, from 1948 to 1954, Kapp was dramaturge at the Deutsche Oper Berlin.

Kapp died in Sonthofen at the age of 78.

== Publications ==
- Richard Wagner und Franz Liszt. Eine Freundschaft, 1908
- Liszt. Eine Biographie, 1909
- Frank Wedekind. Seine Eigenart und seine Werke, 1909
- Richard Wagner. Eine Biographie, 1910
- Richard Wagner und die Frauen. Eine erotische Biographie, 1912
- Paganini. Eine Biographie, 1913
- Berlioz. Eine Biographie, 1917
- Meyerbeer, 1920 (later under the title Giacomo Meyerbeer. Eine Biographie)
- Franz Schreker. Der Mann und sein Werk, 1921
- Weber, 1922 (später unter dem Titel Carl Maria von Weber. eine Biographie)
- Die Oper der Gegenwart, 1922
- Das Opernbuch. Eine Geschichte der Oper und ein musikalisch-dramatischer Führer durch die Repertoireopern, 1923
- Geschichte der Staatsoper Berlin, 1937
- Aus dem Reiche der Oper : ein Blick hinter die Kulissen, 1949
- Richard Wagners Gesammelte Schriften und Briefe (Herausgeberschaft)
