= Giovanni Sollima =

Italian composer

Giovanni Sollima (born 24 October 1962 in Palermo, Sicily, Italy) is an Italian composer and cellist. He was born into a family of musicians and studied cello with Giovanni Perriera and composition with his father, Eliodoro Sollima, at the Conservatorio di Palermo, where he graduated with highest honors. He later studied with Antonio Janigro and Milko Kelemen at the Musikhochschule Stuttgart and at the Universität Mozarteum Salzburg.

As a composer, Sollima's influences are wide ranging, taking in jazz and rock, as well as various ethnic traditions from the Mediterranean area. Sollima's music is influenced by minimalism, with his compositions often featuring modal melodies and repetitive structures. Because his works are characterized by a more diverse and eclectic approach to material than the early American minimalist composers, the American critic Kyle Gann has called Sollima a postminimalist composer.

Sollima teaches at the Accademia Nazionale di Santa Cecilia in Rome and plays a cello by Francesco Ruggieri (made in Cremona in 1679). He has collaborated with the American poet and musician Patti Smith, appearing on her records and performing with her in concert. He also collaborates with the Silk Road Project.

== Music for chamber ensembles ==
- Musica per sonar a più stromenti dialogando fra antica et moderna (1979)
- Notturno (1980)
- Maithuna (1981)
- Orgy (1982)
- Tantra (1983)
- The force that through the green fuse drives the flower by Dylan Thomas (1985)
- La luna (1986)
- Variazioni su un plastico (1986)
- 4 works by Andy Warhol (1987)
- 6 caprices (1987)
- Flowers (1987)
- Primo frammento da "Empedocles" (First fragment of Empedocles), text by Michele Perriera (1989)
- Siciliana con variazione (1989)
- E gli alberi germinarono, e gli uomini e le donne... (1990)
- In B (1991)
- Match Suite (1991)
- Segno in memory of the victims of the Capaci massacre (1992)
- Africa, quintet for 2 violins, viola and 2 cellos (1992)
- Anno uno in memory of the victims of the via D'Amelio massacre (1993)
- Violoncelles, vibrez! version for 6 cellos(1993)
- Heimat-terra (1993)
- The Songlines (1993)
- Angeli nel vulcano (1994)
- A gift (1994)
- Spasimo (1995)
- Sento il canto in curva (1995)
- Il Tracciato di Marta (1995)
- Voyage (1995)
- John Africa (1996)
- Studio per Aquilastro (1997)
- Chi è (1997)
- Lam (1997)
- Yafù (1997)
- Aquilarco, text by Christopher Knowles (1997–98)
- Lamentatio ("Lamentation") (1998)
- Pasolini fragments (1998)
- Reperto n. 12 from a fragment by Schubert (1998)
- S'ota love dance (1998)
- A view from the bottom, text by Mumia Abu Jamal (1998)
- Concerto rotondo (1998)
- I canti (1998)
- The meetings of the waters (1999)
- Millennium Bug (1999)
- Intersong I (1999)
- Subsongs (1999)
- L'interpretazione dei sogni (The interpretation of dreams) (1999)
- Leonardo's ornithoptherus (1999)
- Alone (1999)
- Hell (2000)
- Contrafactus (2000)
- Il Tracciato (2000)
- Viaggio in Italia, texts by Michelangelo Buonarroti, Giordano Bruno and Francesco Borromini (2000)
- Intersong II (2001)
- J. Beuys Song (2001)
- Vram, text by Alessandro Baricco (2002)
- Pillole (2002)
- Bêri (2002)
- Terra Aria from "B song" (2003)
- Terra Danza from "B song" (2003)
- Cello Tree from "B song" (2003)
- Il bell'Antonio, Tema III

== Orchestral works ==
- Concerto grosso (1976)
- String concerto No. 1 (1978)
- String concerto No. 1 (1979)
- Raccapriccio (1979)
- Le Paradis Submergé (1981)
- Two Nocturnes (1984)
- Musivum (1987)
- Le notti bianche (1988)
- The Columbus Egg (1990)
- In B, version for Jazz Band (1991)
- Cello Concerto (1992)
- Africa (1992)
- Agnus Dei (1993)
- Violoncelles, vibrez! (1993)
- Sinfonia in luoghi aperti (Open Air Symphony) (1994)
- MW (1994)
- Angeli (Angels) (1994)
- Adagio (1995)
- Cartolina (Postcard) (1995)
- Aria in rosso (Aria in red) (1996)
- Lam & Dan (1998)
- All the W (1998)
- Guitar chemistry (1999)
- Alleluja (1999)
- Casanova (2000)
- Canti rocciosi, with texts by Dino Buzzati, Dante Alighieri, Ernest Hemingway and 'street rhymes' in Sicilian, Italian and Ladin (2001)
- Contrafactus (2001)
- Tempeste e ritratti (Storms and portraits) (2001)

== Opera and ballet ==
- Notti di Grazia (1991) - Melodramma in un atto, libretto by Dario Oliveri
- Mittersill 101 variazioni sul caso Anton Webern (1996) - Video opera, text by Dario Oliveri, after Goethe
- Cenerentola Azzurro (1994) - Text by Dario Oliveri
- Casanova (2000) - Choreography by Karole Armitage
- Matteo Ricci — Li Madou (2001) - Melologue, text by Filippo Mignini
- J. Beuys song (2001) - Choreography by Carolyn Carlson
- Ellis Island (2002) - Opera in 2 acts, libretto by Roberto Alajmo

== Incidental music for the theatre ==
- Match (1990)
- Cordelia & co. (1991)
- 3 pezzi for " Il sogno spezzato di Rita Atria" (1993)
- 3 pezzi for "Pippo Fava" (1994)
- I Pavoni (1997)

== Installations ==
- Imagining Prometheus (2003)
- Luminaria (2003)

== Discography (as composer) ==
- Aquilarco - Polygram Records - #462546 (1998)
- Spasimo - Agora - #216 (2000)
- John Africa in "La formula del fiore" - Sensible Records: SSB 012, (1999)
- Viaggio in Italia - Agorà (AG 259) (2000)
- Violoncelles, vibrez! - Agorà: AG 155. (1998)
- Violoncelles, vibrez! (on Tracing Astor: Gidon Kremer Plays Astor Piazzolla) - Nonesuch: 79601 (2001)
- Canti rocciosi - I suoni delle Dolomiti (2001)
- Works - Sony Music: DED 519769 2 (2005)
- Heimat Terra, Fiddle Files (on The Magic of Wood: From Lutherie to Music) - Dynamic: 5092 (2005)
- We were trees - Sony/BGM 88697314382 (2008)
- Astrolabioanima - Odd Times Record: OTR 001 (2008)
- Sonnets et Rondeaux - Cobra Records: CBRA 35 (2012)

== Notes ==
The link posted that purports to be for Giovanni Sollima's (music) website is not for his website. Instead it will take you to the website of a health/cosmetics practitioner also called Giovanni Sollima.
