= Ludwig Wenzel Lachnith =

Bohemian horn player

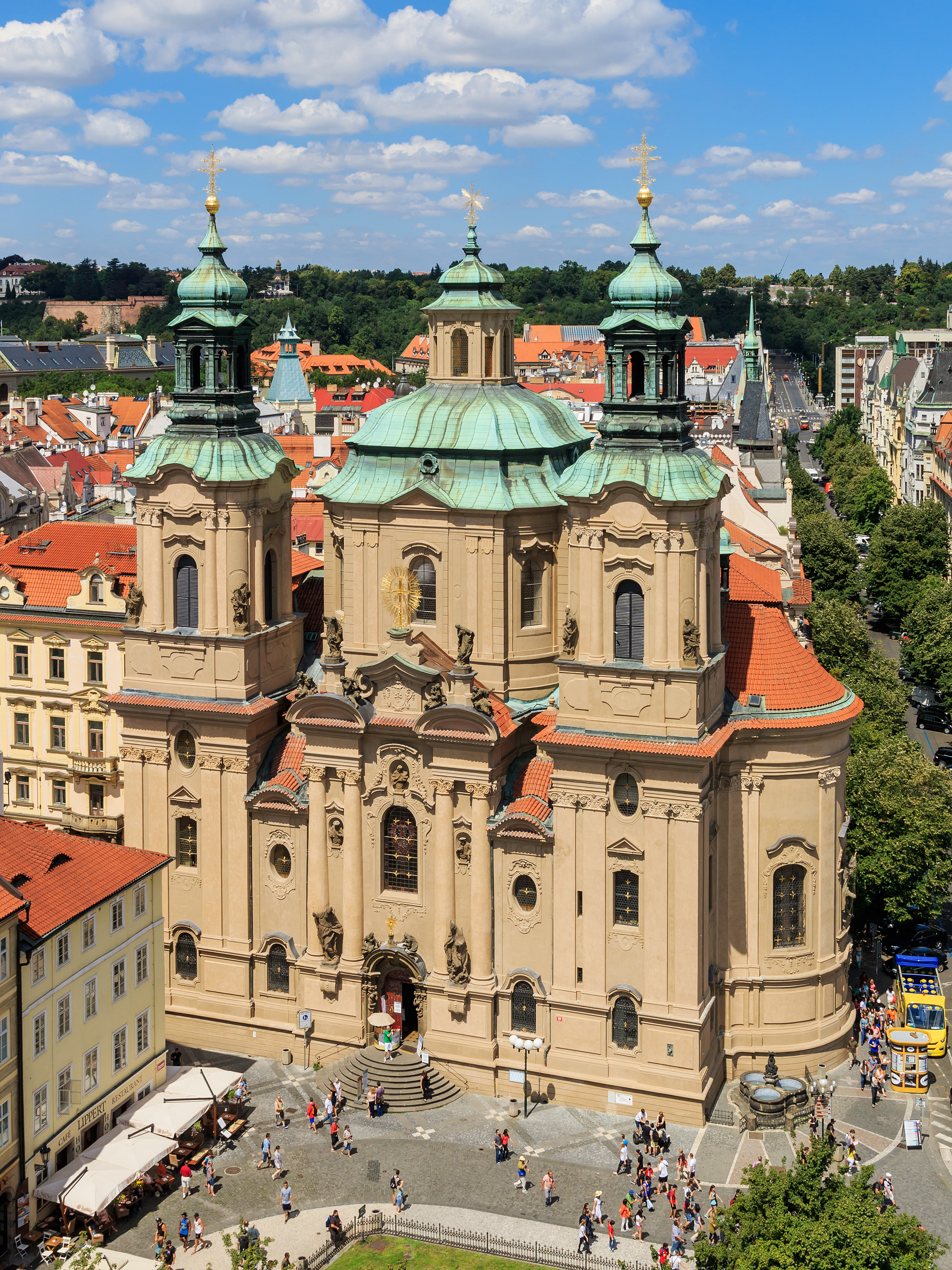
Modern view of St. Nicolas Church in Prague where Lachnith's father was church musician and where Lachnith trained as a boy.

Ludwig Wenzel Lachnith (7 July 1746 – 3 October 1820) was a Bohemian horn player and versatile composer influenced by Joseph Haydn and Ignaz Pleyel. Today he is chiefly remembered because of his adaptations of operas by Wolfgang Amadeus Mozart. The French composer and writer Hector Berlioz immortalized him in a diatribe in his autobiography.

== Biography ==
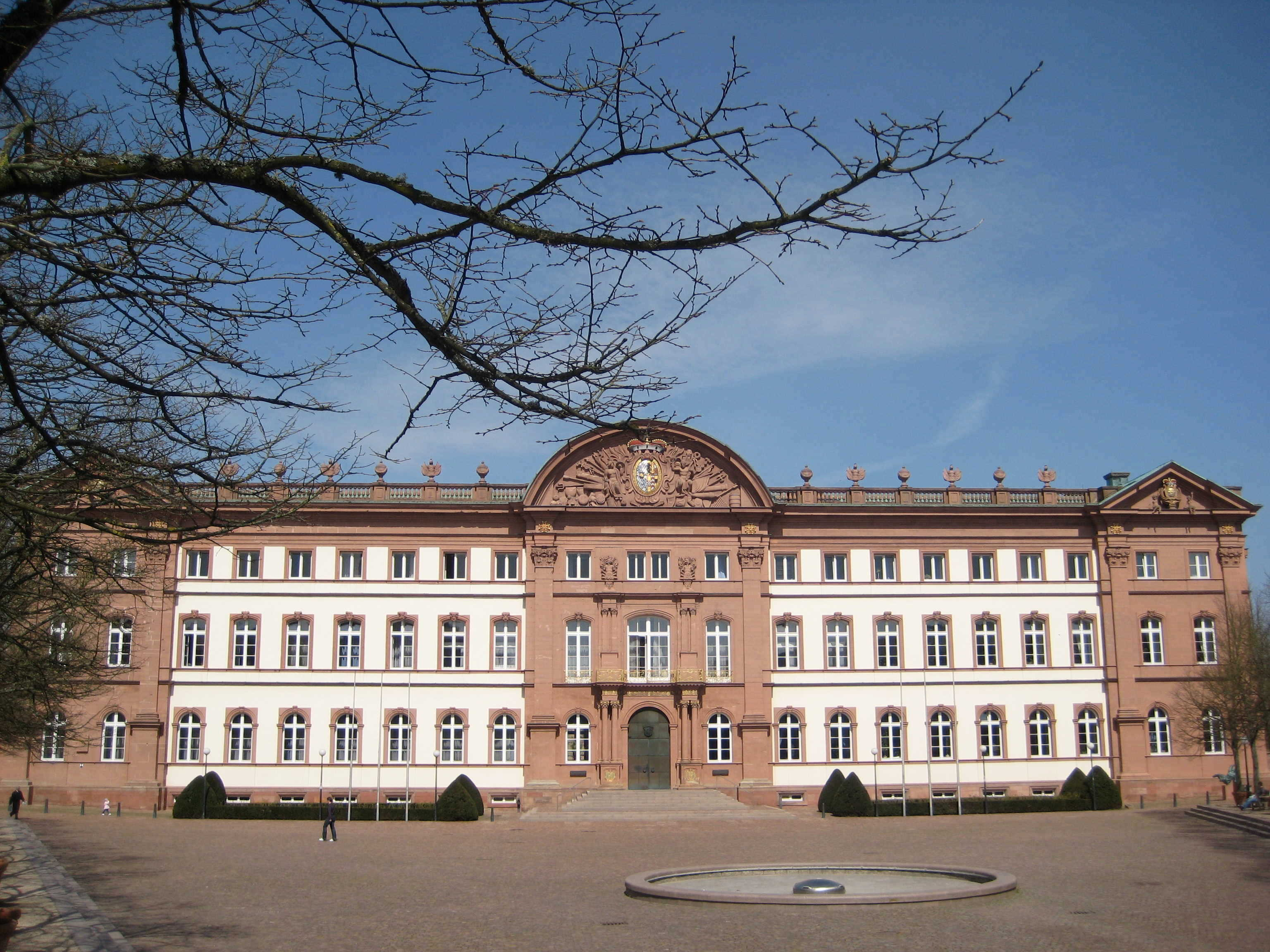
Zweibrücken Castle (modern view)

Lachnith was born in Prague. After early studies with his father Franz, an able church musician in Prague, Lachnith from 1768 onwards became a member of the court orchestra in Zweibrücken.

In 1773 he went to Paris to study French horn with Johann Josef Rudolf (Rodolphe) and later composition with François-André Danican Philidor. Since 1783 he was living permanently in Paris, where his symphonies were played in the Concerts de la Reine (i. e. Marie Antoinette).

With the onset of the French Revolution he got in trouble with the new authorities and had to resign from his post at the Paris Opera. He fled from the terror of the revolution in 1790, came back and henceforth eked out a meagre existence by giving private lessons and arranging operas and even oratorios for Parisian theatres. In 1801 he became instructor at the Paris Opera, but had to leave the following year, only to be reemployed in 1806. He died in Paris.

He is remembered chiefly as a composer of pasticcios, using the music of several composers in one piece. His arrangement of the music and libretto of Mozart's Magic Flute (Die Zauberflöte), appearing under the title Les Mystères d'Isis in 1801, was an instant success but also parodied as Les Misères d'ici. In several of his ventures he had Christian Kalkbrenner, father of the pianist and composer Friedrich Kalkbrenner, as his collaborator.

== Lachnith’s adaptation of Mozart’s Magic Flute – critique ==
=== Hector Berlioz ===
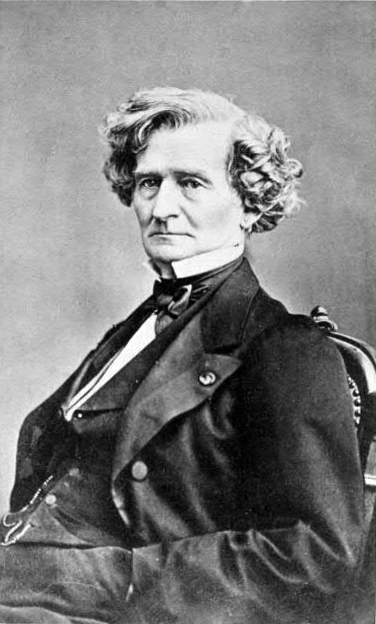
Eminent French composer and outspoken music critic Hector Berlioz (ca. 1865).

Although very successful with the public, Lachnith's adaptation of Mozart’s Magic Flute met with scathing criticism already during his lifetime. Hector Berlioz for one was a fierce (and very funny) critic of such practices. Long before the terms Urtext (original text) and Werktreue (work faithfulness) were coined, Berlioz was demanding just that in a series of articles that were later incorporated into his autobiography:

"It was some years before this that, in order to ensure the success of Mozart's Magic Flute, the manager of the Opéra produced that marvellous travesty of it, Les Mystères d'Isis, the libretto of which is a mystery as yet unveiled by no one. When he had manipulated the text to his liking, our intelligent manager sent for a German composer to help him patch up the music. The German proved equal to the occasion. He stuck a few bars on the end of the overture (the overture of the Magic Flute!), turned part of a soprano chorus into a bass song, adding a few bars of his own; transplanted the wind instruments from one scene to another; changed the air and altered the instrumentation of the accompaniment in Sarastro's glorious song; manufactured a song out of the slaves' chorus, O cara armonia; and converted a duet into a trio. Not satisfied with the Magic Flute, this cormorant must next lay hands on Titus and Don Juan. The song, Quel charme a mes esprits rappelle, is taken from Titus, but only the andante is there, for the allegro, with which it ends, does not seem to have pleased our uomo capace; so he decreed a violent divorce, and, in its stead, put in a patchwork of his own, interspersed with scraps of Mozart. No one would dream of the base uses to which our friend put the celebrated Fin ch’han dal vino, that vivid outburst of libertinism in which Don Juan's whole character is epitomised. He turned it into a trio for a bass and two sopranos, with the following sweetly sentimental lines […]."

"When this wretched hotchpotch was ready it was dubbed Les Mystères d'Isis, was played in that form, and printed and published in full score with the name of that profane idiot Lachnith (which I publish that it may be perpetuated with that of Castil-Blaze) actually bracketed with Mozart's on the title-page. In this wise, two beggars in filthy rags came masquerading before the public in the rich robes of the kings of harmony; and, in this sordid fashion, two men of genius, disguised as monkeys, decked in flimsy tinsel, mutilated and deformed, were presented to the French people, by their tormentors, as Mozart and Weber! And the public was deceived, for no one came forward to punish the miscreants or give them the lie. Alas! how little the public recks of such crimes, even when it is cognizant of them! In Germany and England, as well as in France, such adaptation (which means profanation and spoliation) of masterpieces by the veriest (sic) nobodies is tolerated."

=== Otto Jahn ===
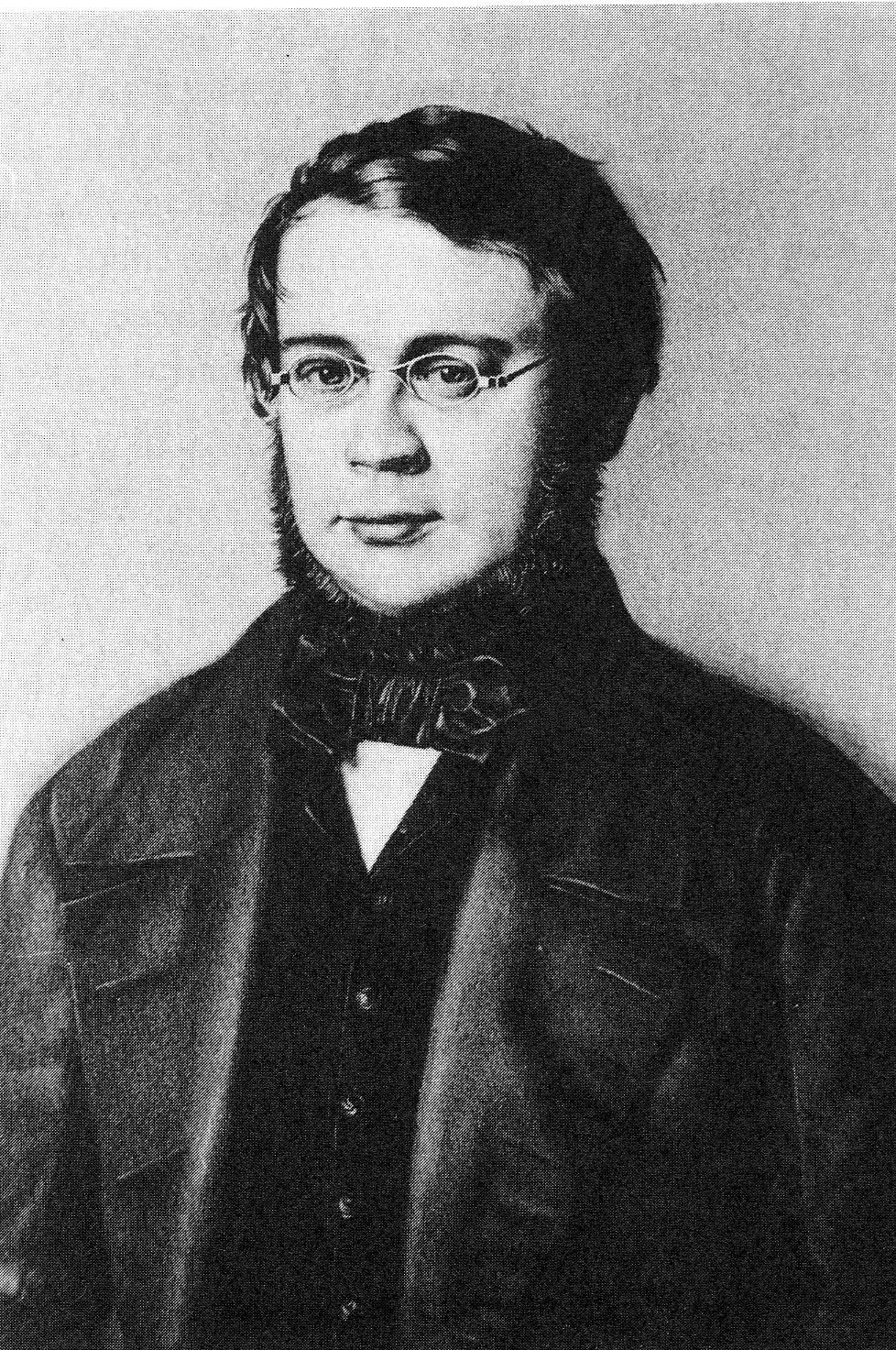
Otto Jahn

For Mozart's biographer Otto Jahn Lachnith's travesty was the "maddest chapter in the history of the Magic Flute":

"The maddest chapter in the history of the Magic Flute, however, was the Parisian performance in 1801 through Lachnith under the title Les Mystères d’Isis. This native Bohemian had the tastelessness to extirpate all that was wonderful and comic, thereby transforming Papageno into a shepherd named Bochoris. No work of art has ever been treated more impiously. Whole scenes (12, 17, 18, 19) were omitted and in their stead pieces from other Operas by Mozart inserted such as the Champagne Aria from Don Juan and an aria from Titus (both rendered into duets!). Also the music itself was through readjustment and changes mistreated. Thus, the opera started with the final chorus and Sarastro’s recitative. This was followed by trio Nr. 16 sung by six priestesses which in turn was followed by a chorus from Titus, and only then came the original introduction. Monostatos' aria was sung by Papagena (renamed Mona), the first aria of the Queen of the Night was sung by Pamina, and the duet (7) became a trio."

"Even the Parisians thought this too much and spoke of Les Misères d'ici and of the opération of the dérangeur (sic) Lachnith. Yet in spite of all this criticism, Lachnith had managed to hit the French taste exquisitely well; the splendid ballets and decoration and the decor in general received unanimous praise as did orchestra and choir. In this way this distortion saw a full 130 performances until 1827. Only in the year 1865 was The Magic Flute finally performed in its original form at the Théâtre Lyrique."

== Works (selection) ==
=== Operas ===
Original compositions by Lachnith include the operas:

- L'Heureuse Reconciliation (1785)
- L'Antiquaire (1789)
- Eugenie et Linval (1798).

=== Oratorios ===
- Saul (1805)
- Battle of Jericho (together with Christian Kalkbrenner, 1805).

=== Orchestral music ===
- 24 symphonies
- 3 concertos for French horn and orchestra

=== Chamber music ===
- 12 string quartets
- 6 piano trios
- 30 sonatas for piano and violin

=== Instruction manuals ===
Written jointly with Louis Adam:

- Méthode ou principe général du doigté pour le forte-piano (1798)
- Exercices préparatoires pour le piano

== Sources ==
- Berlioz, Hector. Autobiography of Hector Berlioz. Translated by Eleanor Holmes and Rachel Holmes. Vol. 1. 2 vols. London: Macmillan and Co., 1884.
- Biographical Article "Lachnith" in: Österreichisches Biographisches Lexikon 1815 – 1950 (in German)
- Biographical Article "Lachnith" in: Oesterreichisches Musiklexikon ONLINE (in German)
- Jahn, Otto. W.A. Mozart. 6th ed. Edited by Hermann Abert. Vol. 2. 2 vols. Leipzig: Breitkopf & Härtel, 1923.
- Slonimsky, Nicolas, ed. Baker's Biographical Dictionary of Musicians. 5th Completely Revised Edition. New York, 1958.
