= Ignace Leybach =

French pianist, organist, music educator and composer (1817-1891)

Ignace Xavier Joseph Leybach (17 July 1817 – 23 May 1891) was a French pianist, organist, music educator and a composer of salon piano music.

== Career ==
Born in Gambsheim, Alsace, Leybach had his early training as an organist with Joseph Wackenthaler (1795–1869), the organist and maître de chapelle of the Strasbourg Cathedral, and then was a pupil in Paris of Friedrich Kalkbrenner and of Chopin. He was a famous pianist in his time, but is largely remembered for a single piece, his Fifth Nocturne, Op. 52, for solo piano; it is still in print. His Fantaisie élégante uses familiar themes from Gounod's Faust.

From 1844 he was organist at the cathédrale Saint-Étienne, Toulouse, succeeding Justin Cadaux. He published a three-volume method for the organ for which he also wrote about 350 pieces. Leybach also wrote motets and liturgical music.

Leybach died in Toulouse.
