= Alexandre Deleyre =

French man of letters and translator from Latin

- Born: January 10, 1726; Portets, near Bordeaux, France
- Died: March 10, 1797 (aged 71); Paris, France
- Occupations: Writer, translator, politician
- Known for: Contributor to the Encyclopédie; Deputy to the National Convention

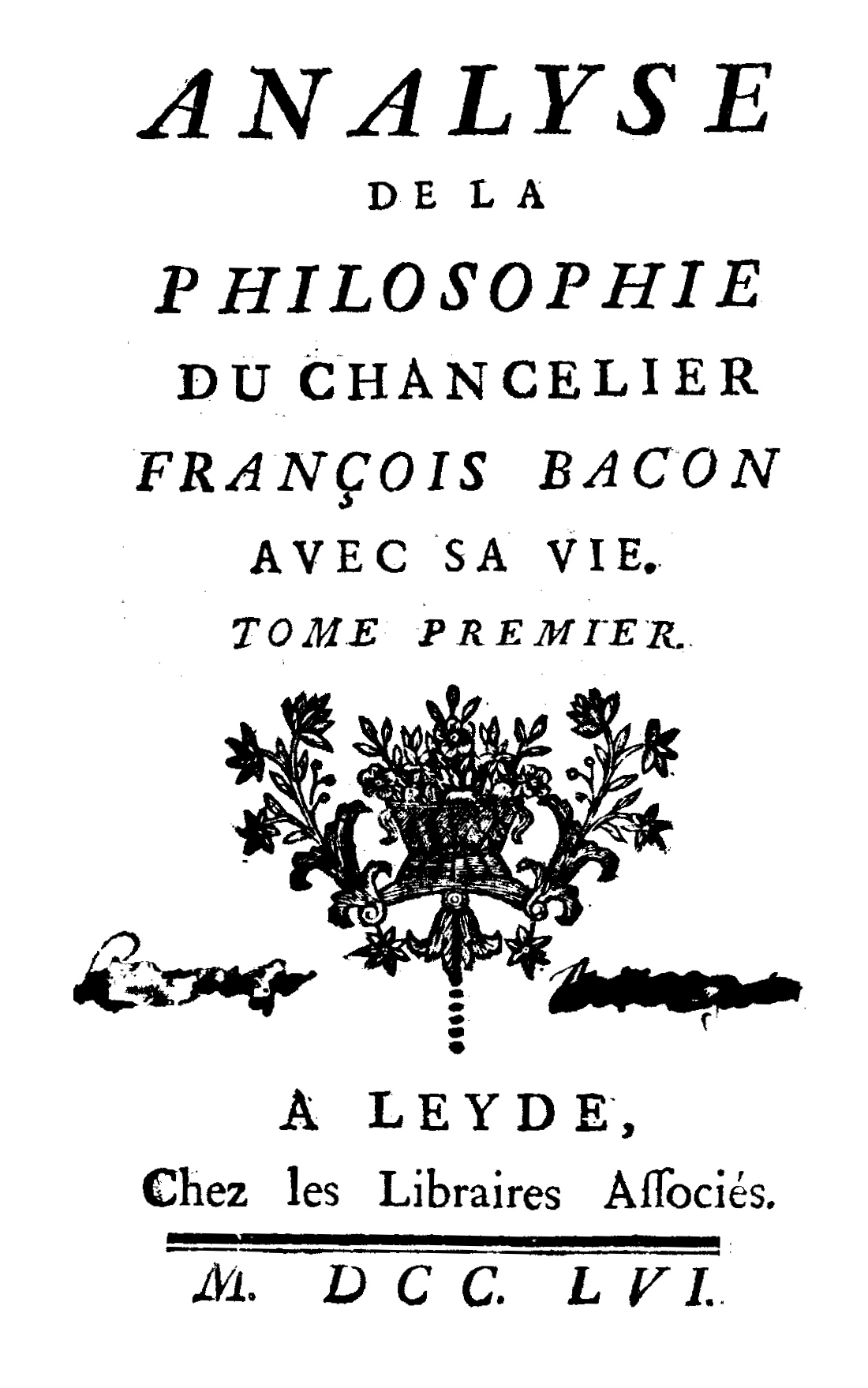
Analyse de la philosophie du chancelier François Bacon, vol. 1, 1756

Alexandre Deleyre (5 or 10 January 1726, Portets near Bordeaux – 10 March 1797, Paris aged 71) was an 18th-century French man of letters and translator from Latin. He was a friend of J.J. Rousseau, who used his translations of Lucretius for compositions.

== Biography ==
Alexandre Deleyre was the son of the bailiff Jean Deleyre from the province Guyenne. He studied at a Jesuit college in Bordeaux but lost his faith. He chose for the bar (law) but then decided to move to Paris. There he looked for other atheists. Montesquieu became the patron of Deleyre and introduced him to the Encyclopedists, Charles Duclos and Baron d'Holbach.

In 1754, he worked for the Journal des Savants. From November 1756 to March 1757, he worked for the Journal étranger with Baron von Grimm. This journal was published by Jean-Baptiste-Antoine Suard, François Arnaud, Antoine François Prévost and the lawyer Pierre-Jean-Baptiste Gerbier.He cooperated with Denis Diderot, Claude Adrien Helvétius and Jean-Jacques Rousseau, philosophers of the French age of Enlightenment. Deleyre contributed with two articles, one on stickpins (Épingle) and Fanatisme to the Encyclopédie; his article on Fortune was refused. In his Dictionnaire philosophique, Voltaire would make use of his article on fanaticism.

In June 1758, he left for Liège where he wrote for the Journal encyclopédique by Pierre Rousseau. After joining the army for a couple of weeks, he became secretary of Choiseul, the French ambassador in Vienna during the height of the Seven Years' War (1759). In 1760 he wanted to get married but when the priest found out he was the author of Fanatisme he was ordered to rewrite the article, humiliate himself and swear an oath on being a good catholic. Protected by the Duke of Nivernais, ambassador in Berlin and London who had been friendly with Montesquieu, he was appointed librarian of Philip, Duke of Parma at the end of the year. He cooperated with Guillaume du Tillot and disagreed with Etienne Condillac as the governor of Ferdinand, Duke of Parma from 1660 till 1768 when they both left. Around 1774 he cooperated with the Abbé Raynal on his book on the two Indies. He wrote about the conquest of Kamchatka, the religion of the Chukchi people, the Lapps, the Eskimos, the concept of happiness and attacked global colonization. He disagreed with Diderot who went to Russia in 1773 on an invitation by Catherine the Great. In 1776, he was depressed and Deleyre settled in Dammarie-lès-Lys closer to nature.

In 1789, he was elected in Cadillac as a deputy to the Constituent assembly and in September 1792 to the National Convention for Landes. He joined Montagnards, where he would address the issue of national education, based on Emile, or On Education, proposing to add a garden to every school. He voted for the execution of Louis XVI in January 1793. The uprising of the Parisian sans-culottes, resulted in the armed Insurrection of 31 May - 2 June 1793 and 31 Girondins, who voted against the execution of the king (in January) were placed under house-arrest. Some escaped and joined the counter-revolution.

In 1795, he was elected in the Council of Ancients. In 1796 he published a rapport on the Corsican refugees, and on Palais Bourbon. He died on 20 Ventôse.

French composer Augustine Renaud d`Allen used Deleyre's text in her composition Six Ancient French Airs.

== Main works ==
- 1755: Analyse de la philosophie du chancelier François Bacon;
- 1759: Le Génie de Montesquieu;
- 1761: L'Esprit de Saint-Évremond;
- 1761: Histoire générale des voyages, ou Nouvelle collection de toutes les relations de voyages par mer et par terre, qui ont été publiées:jusqu'à présent dans les différentes langues de toutes les nations connues; (in collaboration with Antoine François Prévost, Étienne-Maurice Chompré and Jacques-Nicolas Bellin, 1746–1789).
- 1777: Eloge de M. Roux, docteur régent et professeur de chimie à la Faculté de Paris. Amsterdam.
- 1791: Essai sur la vie et les ouvrages de Thomas

== Bibliography ==
- Frank A. Kafker, Jeff Loveland: Antoine-Claude Briasson et l'Encyclopédie, Recherches sur Diderot et sur l'Encyclopédie, n° 35. (online)
- Frank A. Kafker: Les Ventes de l'Encyclopédie. In: Sciences, musiques, Lumières. Ferney, Centre international d'étude du XVIIIe siècle, 2002.
- Joachim Lebreton: Notice sur Deleyre (extraite des Mémoires de l'Académie des sciences morales). (1797) In: Friedrich Melchior Grimm: Correspondance littéraire.
- George Streckeisen-Moultou: J. J. Rousseau. Ses amis et ses ennemis.] (186?)
