= Antoine Le Bailly =

French librettist

Antoine-François Le Bailly (or Lebailly), (1 April 1756, Caen – 13 January 1832, Paris) was a French librettist and fabulist.

Antoine Le Bailly authored some operas, but is mostly known for his fables.

A first collection was published under the title Fables nouvelles, suivies de poésies fugitives (Paris, 1784, in-12; a second one under that of Fables nouvelles (Ibid., 1814, in-12). In a third edition (1823, in-8°), Le Bailly replaced the verse of the epilogue in praise of Napoléon by verse in honor of the Bourbons.

He also composed Corisandre, comédie-opéra (Paris, 1792, in-4°); Diane et Endymion, opera (Ibid., 1814, in-12); le Procès d’Ésope avec les animaux, one-act comedy, in verse and in prose (Paris, 1812, in-12); le Gouvernement des animaux, poème ésopéen (Ibid., 1816, in-8°); Arion, ou le pouvoir de la musique (Ibid. , 1817, in-8°); la Chute des Titans, ou le retour d’Astrée, cantata to mark the coronation of Charles X (Ibid., 1825, in-8°), etc.

== Works ==
Operas and cantatas

- 1791: Corisandre, ou les fous par enchantement, comédie-opéra in three acts, music by Honoré Langlé
- 1791: Œnone, two-act opera, music by Christian Kalkbrenner
- 1792: Soliman et Eronyme, ou Mahomet II, opera, music by Honoré Langlé
- 1800: Gustave Vasa, tragédie lyrique in three acts
- 1801: Hercule au Mont Oeta, opera
- 1801: Le mariage secret de Vénus, opera
- 1802: Calisto, opera
- 1809: Les amants napolitains, ou la gageure indiscrète, three-act opéra bouffon on music of Cosi fan tutte by Mozart
- 1811: Le choix d’Alcide, opéra-ballet in one act, music by Honoré Langlé, in-8°, Brasseur aîné, Paris
- 1812: L'amour vengé, opera
- 1814: Diane et Endymion, two-act opéra-ballet
- 1817: Arion, ou le pouvoir de la musique, two-part cantata on a music parodied of Mozart
- 1825: La chute des Titans, ou le retour d'Astrée, cantata

Fables and varia

- 1781: Fables nouvelles suivies de poésies fugitives, in-12, Paris, reprinted in 1784
- 1786: Les Surprises, comédie en un acte et en vers
- 1803: Le charadiste de société, ou recueil de charades nouvellement composées sur tous les substantifs français, in-12, Desenne et Martinet, Paris, reprinted in 1809 and 1810
- 1811: L’oracle du destin, ou les Héraclides, allégorie sur la naissance de S.M. le roi de Rome, Brasseur aîné, Paris, 22 March
- 1811: Fables de M.A.F. Le Bailly suivies du choix d’Alcide, apologue grec mis en action pour la scène, in-8°, Chaumerot, Paris
- 1812: Le procès d'Ésope avec les animaux, comedy in one act in verse and in prose
- 1816: Fables de M. Le Bailly suivies du Gouvernement des animaux, ou l’Ours réformateur, poème ésopique divisé en cinq fables, Paris, reprinted by J.L.J. Brière, bookseller in Paris (1823)
- 1821: Hommages poétiques à La Fontaine, choix de pièces en vers, composées en l’honneur de ce fabuliste
- 1825: La chute des Titans, ou le retour d’Astrée, cantate adressée, à l'occasion du sacre, à sa majesté Charles X, roi de France et de Navarre, A. Neveu, Paris
