= Camille-Marie Stamaty =

French pianist and composer

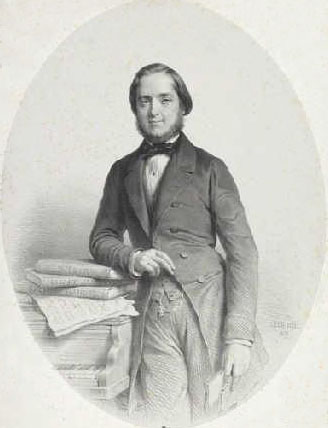

Camille-Marie Stamaty (13 March 1811 – 19 April 1870) was a French pianist, piano teacher and composer predominantly of piano music and studies (études). Today largely forgotten, he was one of the preeminent piano teachers in 19th-century Paris. His most famous pupils were Louis Moreau Gottschalk and Camille Saint-Saëns.

Stamaty was the star pupil of Friedrich Kalkbrenner and heir to Kalkbrenner's teaching method. He taught a crisp, fine, even filigree piano playing that concentrated on evenness of scales, independence of fingers and minimum movement of body and arms.

Stamaty composed a great number of piano studies, various other shorter piano works (waltzes, fantasies, quadrilles, and variations), a piano concerto and some chamber music. None of his music is still in the repertoire today.

== Biography ==
=== Descent and family background ===
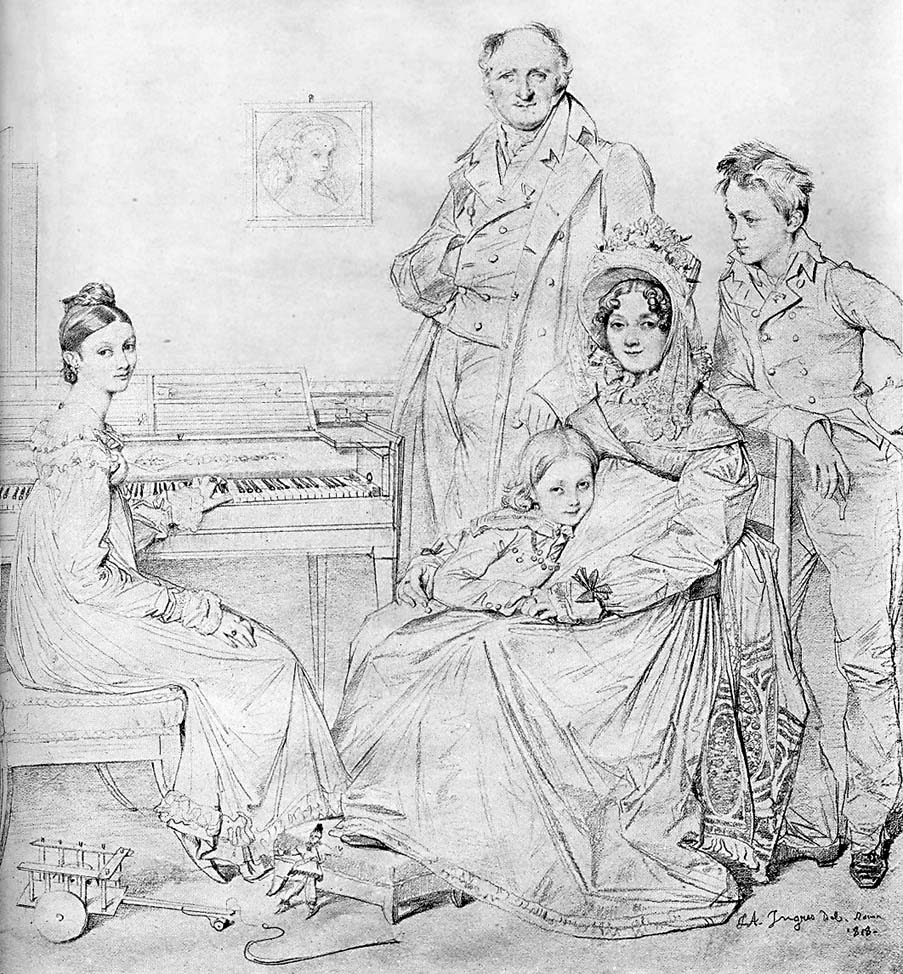
Stamaty as a seven-year-old boy (in his mother's lap) with his family by Ingres. Rome 1818.

Camille-Marie Stamaty, born in Rome, was the son of a naturalized Greek father and a French mother. His father was for a time French consul in the Italian town of Civitavecchia. His mother was French and according to Antoine François Marmontel, who probably knew her, a fine singer of Italian operatic arias. Stamaty's father died in 1818, which forced the family to move back to France, first to Dijon, later on to Paris.

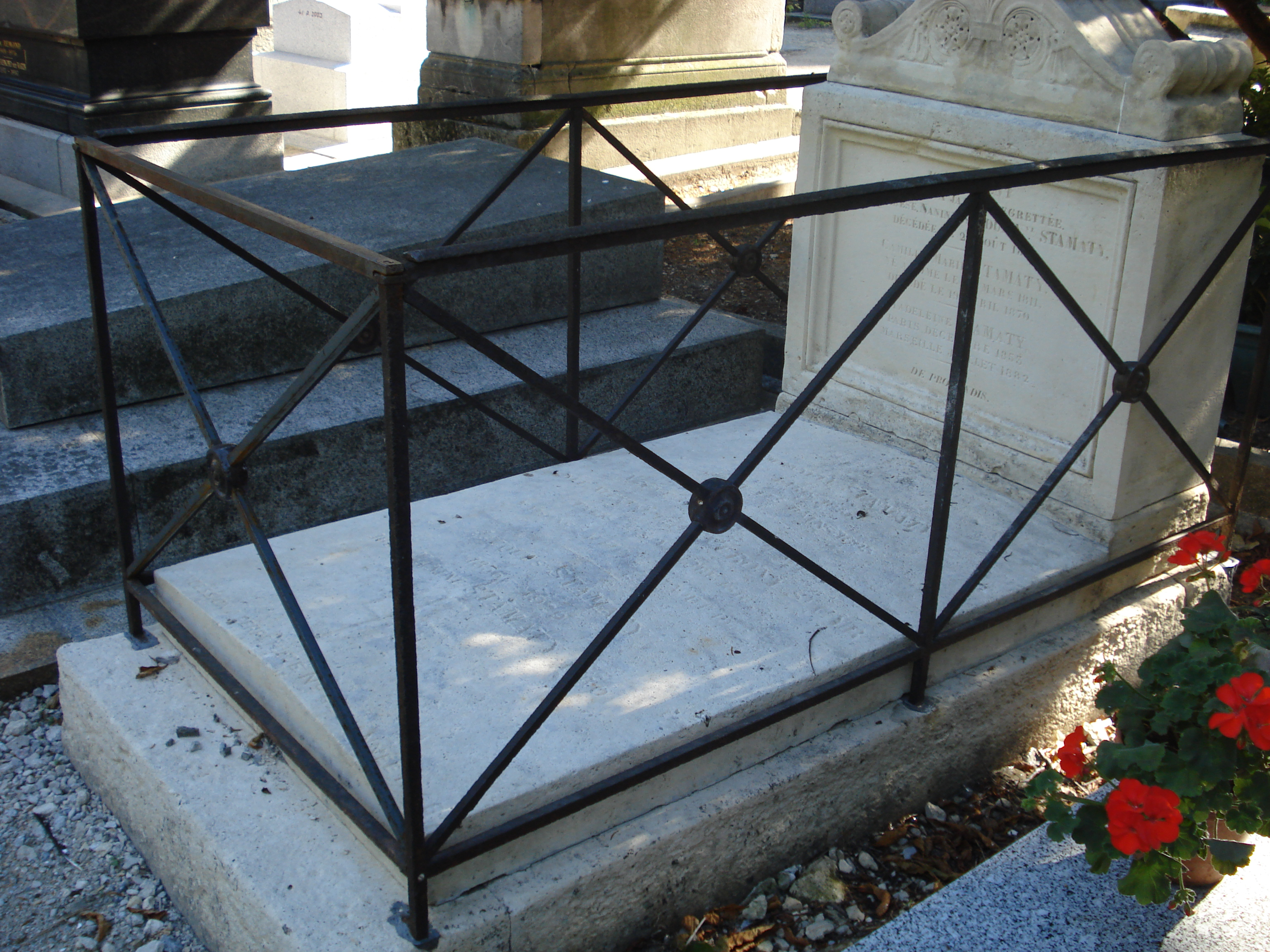
The grave in the cemetery Montmartre

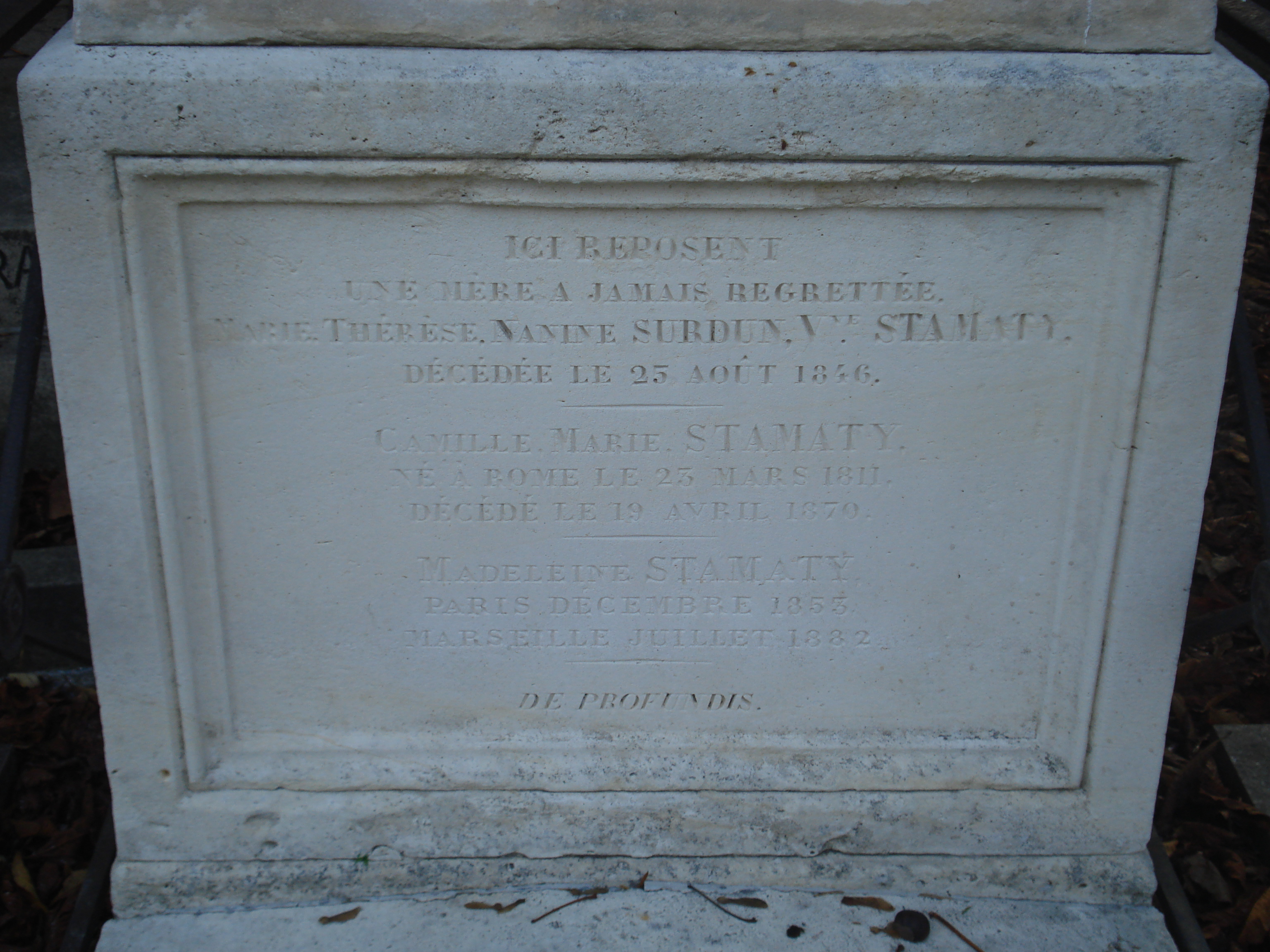
The grave in the cemetery Montmartre

=== 1825–1836: Musical training and education ===
Stamaty did not have musical training from an early age on. Marmontel mentions that his musical studies had to take second place after classes in literature and history. Stamaty did not have a piano of his own before he was fourteen years of age. His mother, on the advice of her family, was against a career of her son in music, although Stamaty showed considerable musical gifts from an early age on. Stamaty's family wanted him to become a diplomat, a civil engineer or a clerk in the administration. Stamaty did become a civil servant but he did not give up on music altogether. In his spare time he kept practicing and composing and his playing must have been so good that he could perform at soirees in fashionable Parisian homes. This was no mean achievement as Paris was considered to be the city of pianists and Stamaty had ample competition in fashionable salons from Sigismond Thalberg, Franz Liszt, Stephen Heller, Henri Herz, Émile Prudent and scores of lesser known piano players.

=== 1832: Kalkbrenner's star pupil ===
Finally it was an encounter with Friedrich Kalkbrenner that decided Stamaty's fate. Kalkbrenner had been looking for a pupil who would continue his school for some time. He had considered Frédéric Chopin, but Chopin on the advice of his teacher Józef Elsner had turned him down. The same had happened with Charles Hallé. Hallé, too, had at first sought out Kalkbrenner to become his pupil, but Kalkbrenner's stiff, old-fashioned playing deterred Hallé so much that he decided otherwise.

Stamaty in many ways was the ideal candidate for Kalkbrenner. He was talented, ambitious and, in addition to that, he was poor and bored at his job in the Préfecture. And above all he was prepared to suffer Kalkbrenner who had a reputation as a martinet. Marmontel shrewdly points out that, as Stamaty was no artist on the scale of Chopin and thus lacked the strong personality of the great genius, he was ideally suited for Kalkbrenner's strict regime. So when Kalkbrenner heard Stamaty play a quadrille with variations of his own composition he approached Stamaty and made him a business proposal: Stamaty would become his pupil and his répètiteur at the same time. A "répètiteur" was an auxiliary teacher to Kalkbrenner who in his later years did little teaching himself. Kalkbrenner gave fashionable and very expensive piano courses for selected pupils, while Stamaty would prepare students for these courses and do all the preparatory teaching.

=== 1832–1836: Studies with Benoist, Reicha and Mendelssohn ===
Even as teacher, Stamaty (one guesses supervised by Kalkbrenner) did not neglect his studies in music theory. He received lessons in organ playing from François Benoist and in harmony and counterpoint from Anton Reicha. Finally, in October 1836, Stamaty went to Leipzig to receive the finishing touches of his education from Felix Mendelssohn. Mendelssohn writes about the lessons he gave Stamaty in a letter to Ferdinand Hiller on 29 October 1836:

"Stamaty is staying here, and I have got to teach him counterpoint – I declare I really don't know much about it myself. He says, however, that that is only my modesty."

On 26 November 1836, Mendelssohn wrote some more about Stamaty to Hiller:

"Stamaty will be at Frankfort in a few days, on his way back to Paris. I maintain that he has got de l'Allemagne and du contrepoint double par dessus les Oreilles."

Stamaty figured also in a letter Mendelssohn's sister Rebecca wrote to Karl Klingemann on 4 October 1836:

"Moreover, Kalkbrenner's best pupil, Mr. Stamaty, élève du conservatoire de Paris, and popular music master, is here in Germany learning music from Felix, and refuses to play until he has learned something better".

=== 1835–1870: Celebrity teacher ===
For some 35 years (1835–1870) Stamaty must have been the most sought after and the most fashionable piano teacher in Paris. He had numerous students, most of them from wealthy families in the aristocratic Faubourgs (Saint-Germain and Saint-Honoré). He charged some of the highest fees in Paris. According to Marmontel, he was a born teacher and also had the useful talent of inspiring trust not so much in his pupils but in their mothers:

"Let's add that he [Stamaty] combined all the proper qualities that would inspire confidence and trust in mothers of families: distinction, reserve, correct and pure talent. He talked little and achieved a lot.

Apart from Louis Moreau Gottschalk, Stamaty's most famous pupil was Camille Saint-Saëns. Saint-Saëns started with Stamaty when he was seven years old (1842) and he stayed with him until he was fourteen (1849), whence he went on to the Paris Conservatoire. Although Saint-Saëns in his later life was very critical, even dismissive of Stamaty's teaching, it is a fact that Saint-Saëns under Stamaty's tutelage developed into a first rate pianist who maintained the high level of his playing all his life, well into his eighties.

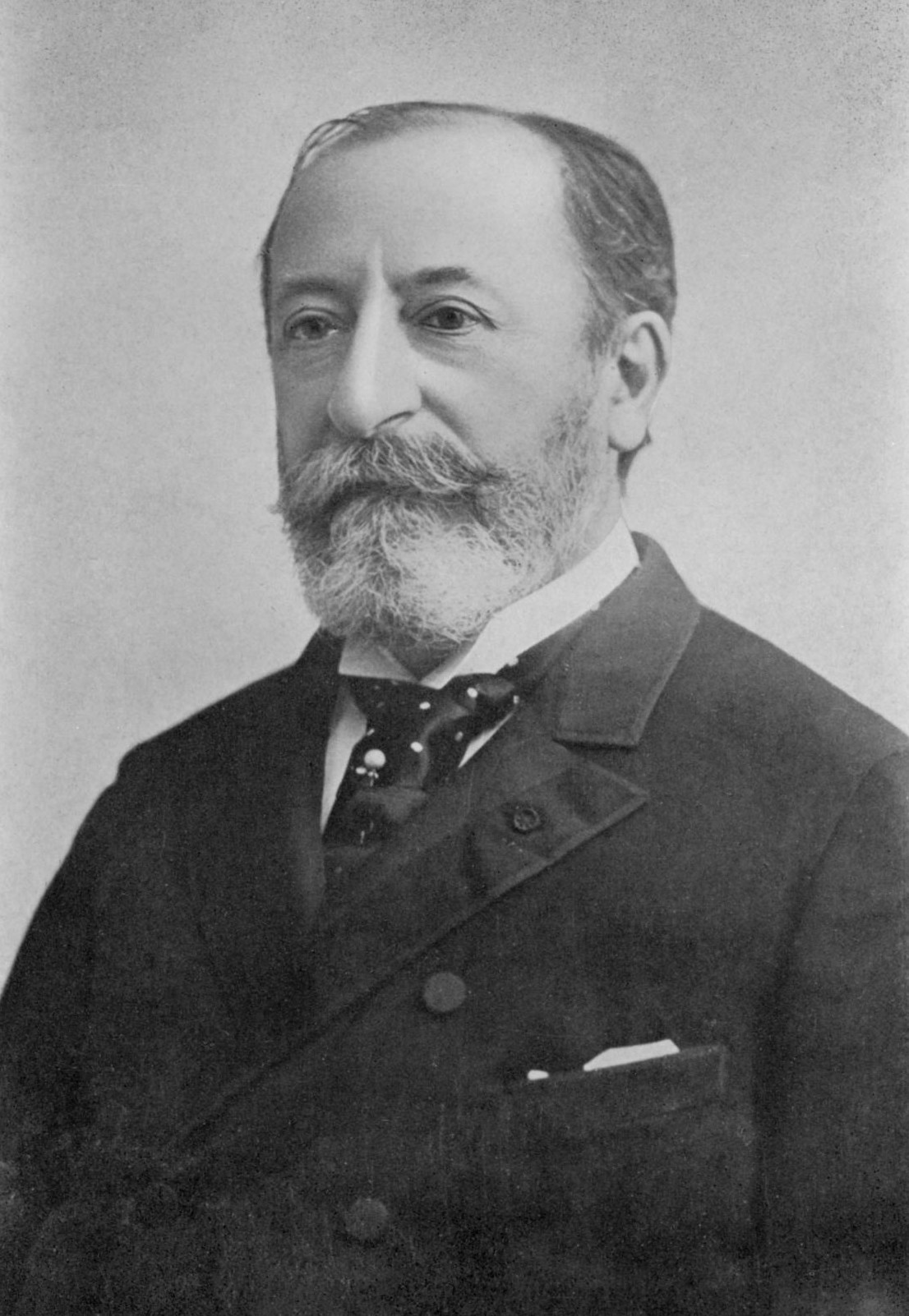
Camille Saint-Saëns

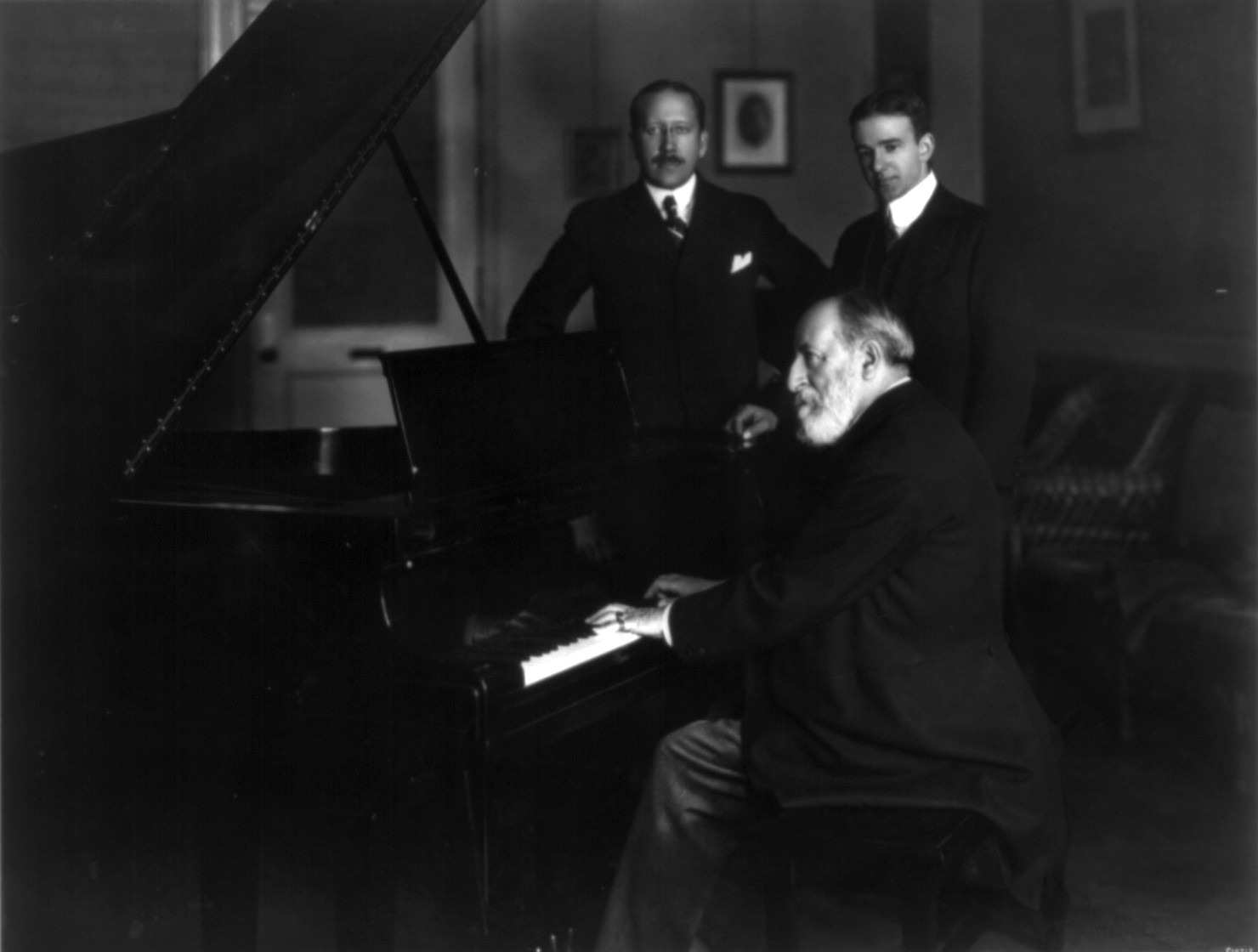
Camille Saint-Saëns 1916

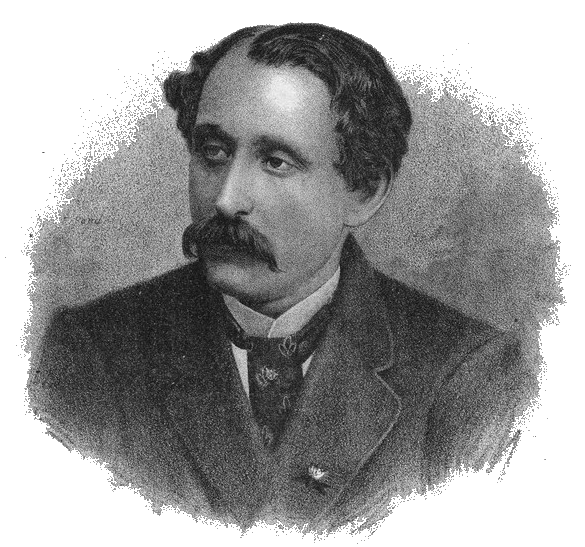
Louis Moreau Gottschalk

=== Personal life and crisis (1848) ===
Stamaty, from the age of 19 on, suffered from nervous exhaustion, overwork and frequent and severe bouts from what was then called rheumatism. Sometimes these illnesses lasted for up to half a year; during this time Stamaty was forced to give up all musical activities. When his mother died in 1846, Stamaty grieved so much that he left Paris to retreat to Rome for a full year. Stamaty married in 1848 and became the father of four children. Marmontel points out that Stamaty was the most devoted of husbands and fathers.

== Piano technique ==
Stamaty's piano technique has its roots in the piano manufacturing craft of the first decades of the 19th century. Most pianos manufactured in France before 1850 had a light action and an easy touch. These pianos were ideal for the execution of rapid scales, facile arpeggios and quickly repeated notes. This resulted in an elegant and glittering bravura playing ideally suited for salons and smaller venues.

Stamaty's piano technique was firmly rooted in the pre-Steinway era of pianos built with a wooden frame. Marmontel clearly states that Stamaty was a "pianist of style but was no transcendental virtuoso" and that his playing lacked "warmth, colour and brilliance". Stamaty's method prescribed complete immobility of body and arms, elbows tucked into the body and all action of the muscles limited to finger and forearms. Saint-Saëns who during his long life had witnessed the development from the old purely digital technique to the transcendental virtuosity of Franz Liszt, Anton Rubinstein and even Leopold Godowsky sums up the advantages and the drawbacks of the Kalkbrenner-Stamaty school like this:

"Firmness of the fingers is not the only thing that one learns from Kalkbrenner's method for there is also refinement of the quality of the sound made by the fingers alone, a valuable resource which is unusual in our day. Unfortunately, this school also invented the continuous legato, which is both false and monotonous; the abuse of nuances, and a mania for continuous expressivo used with no discrimination."

== Selected works ==
His works include a great quantity of studies, shorter piano works (waltzes, fantasies, quadrilles, variations), several sonatas, some chamber music and a piano concerto. The only work of his still in print are the "Finger Rhythm Studies" (Études des doigts, Op. 36). Stamaty's studies are similar to the studies of Carl Czerny. There are many similarities between Stamaty's best output and Czerny's more demanding studies such as his Études de mécanisme, Op. 499.

- Piano Concerto in A minor, Op. 2
- Variations on an Original Theme, Op. 3
- Études pittoresques, Op. 21
- Études progressives, Opp. 37–39
- Chant et méchanisme, Op. 38
- Études concertantes, Opp. 46, 47
- Les Farfadets
- Rythme des doigts
- Six Études caractéristiques sur Obéron
- 12 transcriptions: Souvenir du Conservatoire
- Piano Sonata in F minor
- Piano Sonata in C minor
- Piano Trio

== Sources ==
- Chopin, Frédéric, Chopin's Letters, unabridged and slightly corrected Dover Reprint (1988) of the original Knopf edition, edited by E. L. Voynich (New York: Alfred A. Knopf, 1931), ISBN 0-486-25564-6.
- Ehrlich, Cyril, The Piano, A History, revised edition (Oxford: Clarendon Press, 1990), ISBN 0-19-816171-9.
- Hallé, C.E. Hallé and Marie, Life and Letters of Sir Charles Hallé (London: Smith, Elder & Co., 1896).
- Hense, Sebastian, The Mendelssohn Family (1729–1847). From Letters and Journals, vol. 2 (New York: Harper & Brothers, 1881).
- Hiller, Ferdinand, Mendelssohn - Letters and Recollections (London: Macmillan & Co., 1874).
- Karasowski, Moritz, Frédèric Chopin. His Life and Letters (London: William Reeves, n. d. [c.1880]).
- Loggins, Vernon, Where the Word Ends. The Life of Louis Moreau Gottschalk (Baton Rouge: Louisiana State University Press, 1958), ISBN 0-8071-0373-X.
- Marmontel, Antoine Francois, Les Pianistes célèbres (Paris: Imprimerie Centrale des Chemins de Fer, A. Chaix et Cie, 1878).
- Saint-Saëns, Camille, Musical Memoirs, translated by Edward Gile Rich (Boston: Small, Maynard & Co., 1919).
- Saint-Saëns, Camille, Musical Memoirs newly annotated edition by Roger Nichols (Oxford: Oxford University Press, 2008), ISBN 0-19-532016-6.
- Schonberg, Harold C., The Great Pianists, revised and updated edition (New York: Simon & Schuster, 1984). ISBN 0-671-63837-8
