= François Arnaud (ecclesiastic) =

French clergyman and philologist (1721–1784)

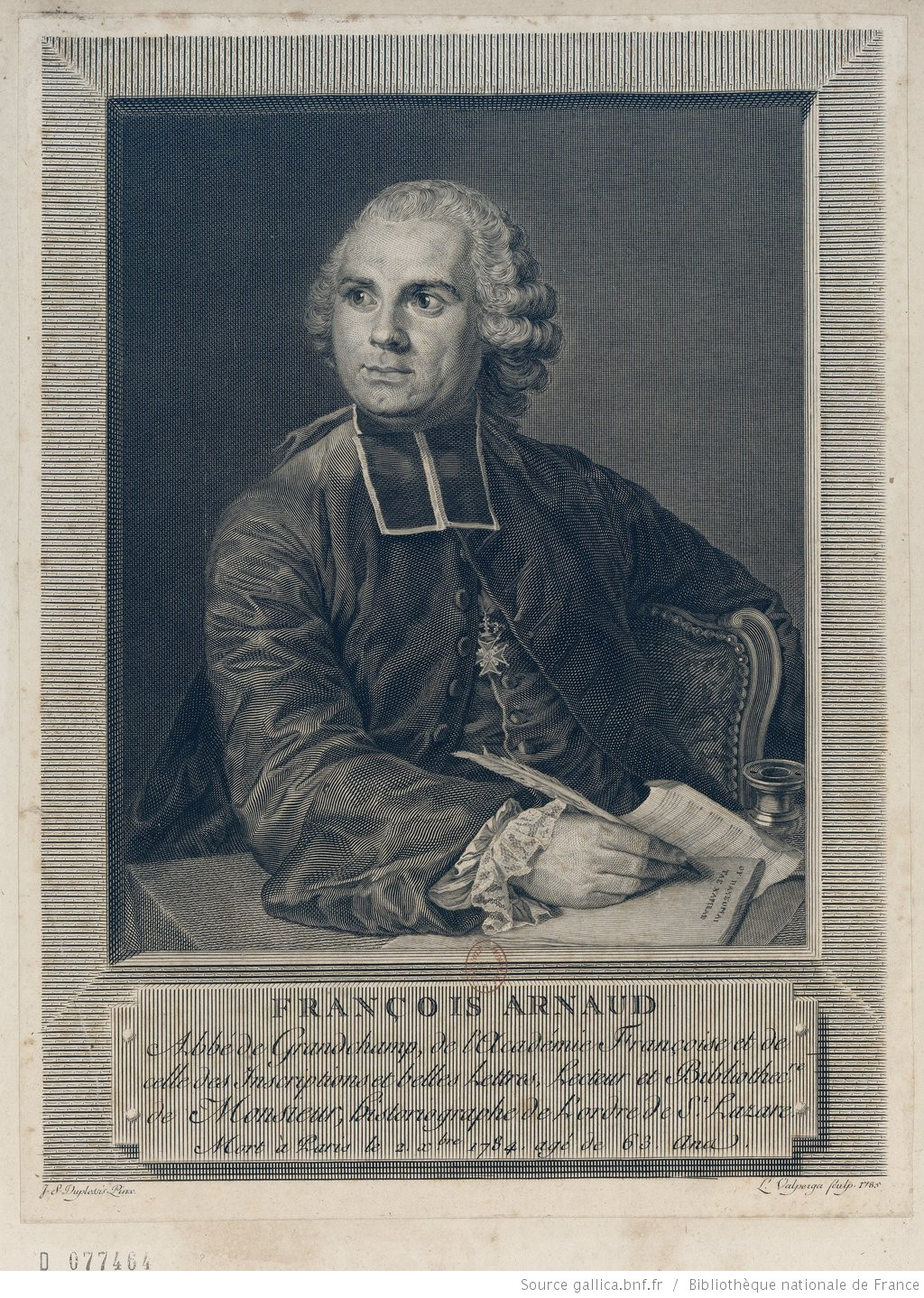
- Born: 27 July 1721; Carpentras
- Died: 2 December 1784 (aged 63); Paris
- Occupations: Linguist; Librarian

François Arnaud (Comtat-Venaissin, 27 July 1721 – 2 December 1784) was a French clergyman, writer, and philologist.

== Biography ==
Abbé of Grandchamp and librarian to the count of Provence (the future Louis XVIII), he contributed to the Journal étranger and the Gazette littéraire de l'Europe. From 1766, he directed la Gazette. A friend of Suard, he also attended the salons of Mme Necker and Mlle Lespinasse. Through Mlle Lespinasse's support he was elected to the Académie française on 11 April 1771 and was received into it by Châteaubrun on 13 May, making the subject of his reception speech On the character of ancient languages compared to the French language. The same year he was admitted to the Académie des Inscriptions. He collaborated with Fréron and, alongside Suard, led the Gluckists in their quarrel with the Piccinnists. His collected works amount to 3 volumes.
