= Nikolaus Lenau =

Austrian poet (1802–1850)

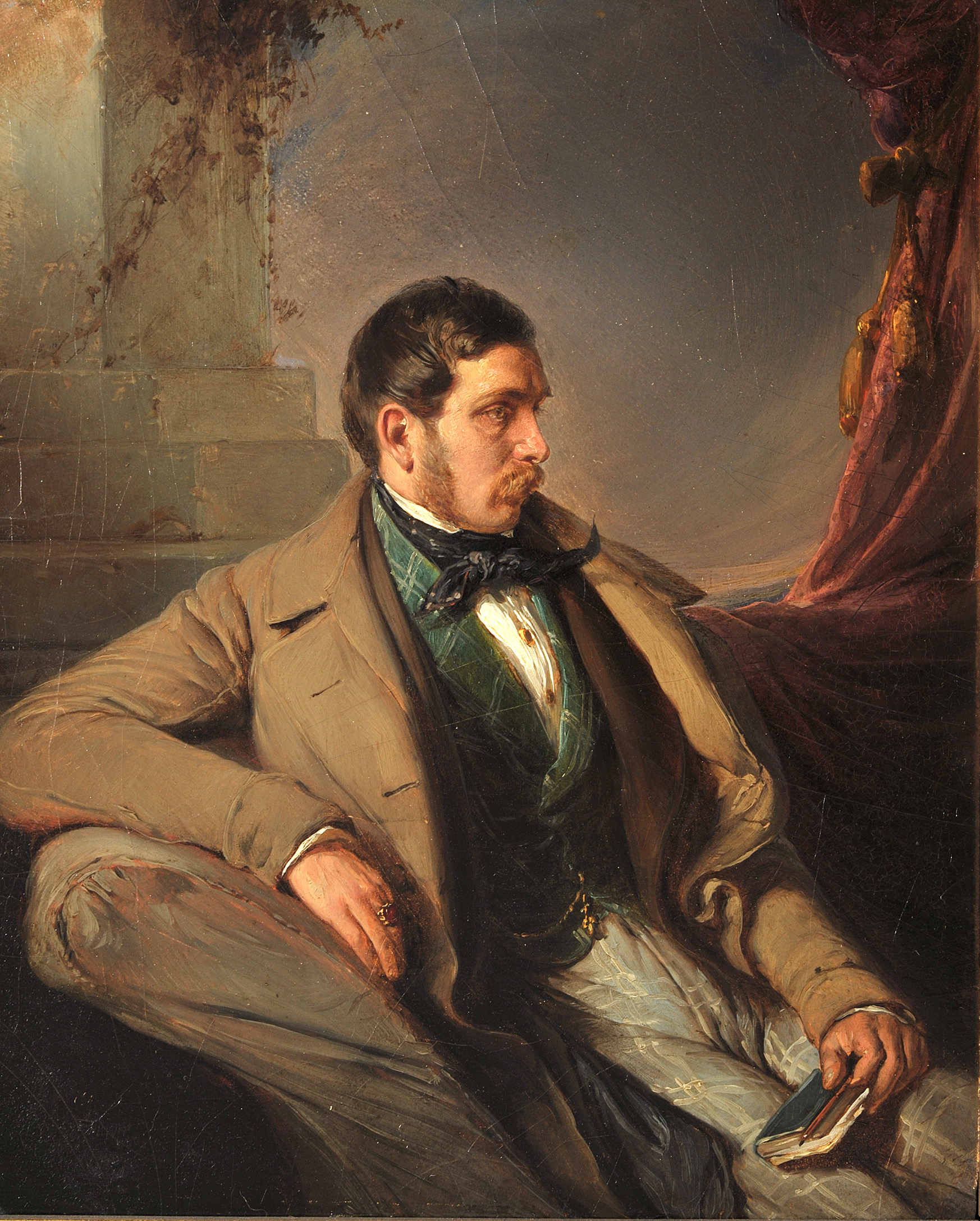
Lenau in 1839

Nikolaus Lenau was the pen name of Nikolaus Franz Niembsch Edler von Strehlenau (13 August 1802 – 22 August 1850), a German-language Austrian poet.

== Biography ==
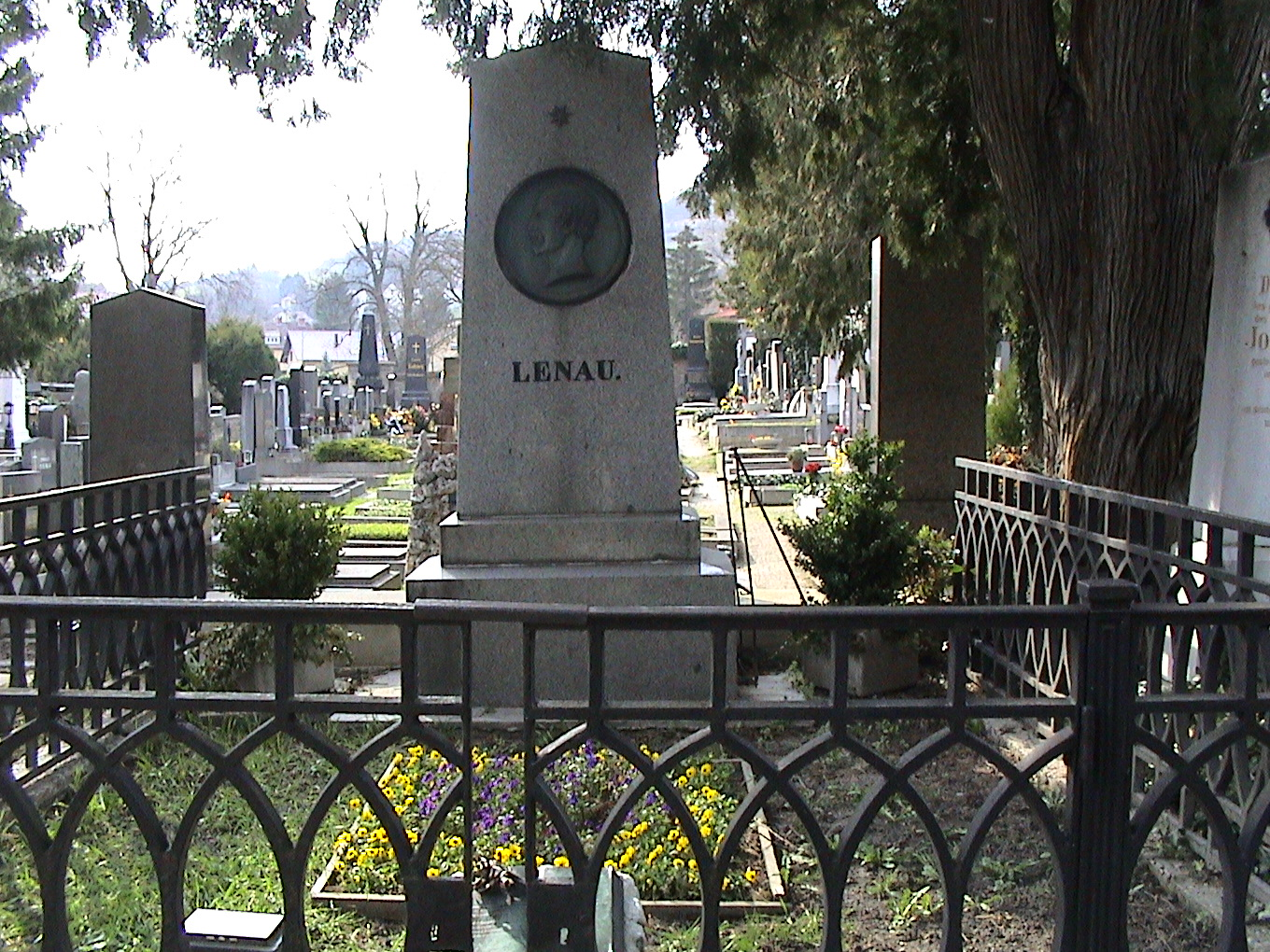
Lenau's Grave in Weidling, Austria

He was born at Csatád (Schadat), Kingdom of Hungary, now Lenauheim, Banat, then part of the Habsburg monarchy, now in Romania. His father, a Habsburg government official, died in 1807 in Buda, leaving his children in the care of their mother, who remarried in 1811. In 1819 Nikolaus went to the University of Vienna; he subsequently studied Hungarian law at Pozsony (Bratislava) and then spent the next four years qualifying himself in medicine. Unable to settle down to any profession, he began writing verse. The disposition to sentimental melancholy inherited from his mother, stimulated by disappointments in love and by the prevailing fashion of the romantic school of poetry, descended into gloom after his mother's death in 1829.

Soon afterwards, however, a legacy from his grandmother enabled him to devote himself wholly to poetry. His first published poems appeared in 1827, in Johann Gabriel Seidl's Aurora. In 1831 he moved to Stuttgart, where he published a volume of Gedichte (1832) dedicated to the Swabian poet, Gustav Schwab. He also made the acquaintance of Ludwig Uhland, Justinus Kerner, Karl Mayer and others. His restless spirit longed for change, and he determined to seek peace and freedom in America.

In October 1832 he landed at Baltimore and settled on a homestead in Ohio. He also lived six months in New Harmony, Indiana, with a group called the Harmony Society. Life in the primeval forest fell lamentably short of the ideal he had pictured. He disliked Americans with their eternal English lisping of dollars (englisches Talergelispel), and in 1833 returned to Germany. The appreciation of his first volume of poems revived his spirits.

From then on he lived partly in Stuttgart and partly in Vienna. In 1836 his Faust appeared, in which he laid bare his own soul to the world; in 1837, Savonarola, an epic in which freedom from political and intellectual tyranny as an essential component of Christianity was stated. In 1838 his Neuere Gedichte proved that Savonarola had been the result of a passing exaltation. Of these new poems, some of the finest were inspired by his hopeless passion for Sophie von Löwenthal, the wife of a friend. In 1842 appeared Die Albigenser, and in 1844 he began writing his Don Juan, a fragment of which was published after his death.

Soon afterwards he developed signs of mental ill-health. In October 1844, he jumped from a window one morning and ran down a street shouting "Revolt! Freedom! Help! Fire!". He was placed in an asylum, under restraint, for the remainder of his life. He died in the asylum at Oberdöbling, possibly from neurosyphilis, near Vienna and was buried in the cemetery of Weidling, near Klosterneuburg. On his grave is the replica of an open book with an extract from one of his poems (An Frau Kleyle) inscribed on the left-hand page, while on the right-hand page there is the final stanza from his poem Vergangenheit. The city of Stockerau in Lower Austria has proclaimed itself "Lenau City", because Nikolaus Lenau went on extensive walks in the alluvial forests next to Stockerau and the Danube and was inspired to write one of his most famous lyric poems, "Schilflieder", during this time. He has various streets and squares in Vienna and the surrounding area named after him.

His political poems, such as "By the Grave of a Minister," reveal Lenau's liberal sympathies with their attacks on the despotism of Metternich's reactionary system and the alleged corruption of the Catholic Church. Lenau's fame rests mainly upon his shorter poems; even his epics are essentially lyric in quality. His excellent poem, "Herbst", expresses the sadness and melancholy he felt after his sojourn in the United States and his strenuous travels across the Atlantic to return to Europe. In it, he mourns the loss of youth, the passing of time and his own sense of futility. The poem is archetypal of Lenau's style and culminates with the speaker dreaming of death as a final escape from emptiness. He is the greatest modern lyric poet of Austria, and the typical representative in German literature of that pessimistic Weltschmerz which, beginning with Lord Byron, reached its culmination in the poetry of Giacomo Leopardi.

Lenau's Sämtliche Werke were first published in 4 vols. by Anastasius Grün in 1855, but there are several more modern editions, as those by Max Koch in Joseph Kürschner's Deutsche Nationalliteratur of 1888 (vols. 154 and 155), and E. Castle (2 vols., 1900).

== Legacy ==
- Composer Marie Schauff (fl. 1799–1844) set Lenau’s poems to music in her “Gedichte von Lenau” opus 3.
- Franz Liszt composed "Der traurige Mönch" (The Sad Monk) after the poem of the same name by Nikolaus Lenau. The piece is part of Liszt's exploration of Faustian themes and is considered a significant example of his late-period style.
- Robert Schumann, whom Lenau met in 1829, set six of his poems in the Sechs Gedichte und Requiem, Op. 90. The cycle was composed in 1850; Lenau died on the day of its premiere at Dresden.
- “Die Nacht” and “Die Sennin,” songs by Sophie Seipt (1812–1889) are based on poems by Lenau.
- Lieder by composer Pauline Volkstein (1849–1925) use text by Lenau.
- Notturno, a 1933 song cycle by Othmar Schoeck includes settings of nine poems by Lenau.
- The composer Heinz Holliger has written a song cycle, Lunea (2013), using Lenau texts, and an opera, also called Lunea, based on the song cycle.
- Lenau's Don Juan served as the inspiration for German composer Richard Strauss's tone poem Don Juan, Op. 20.
