= Jean-François de La Harpe =

French playwright, writer and critic (1739–1803)

Jean François de la Harpe
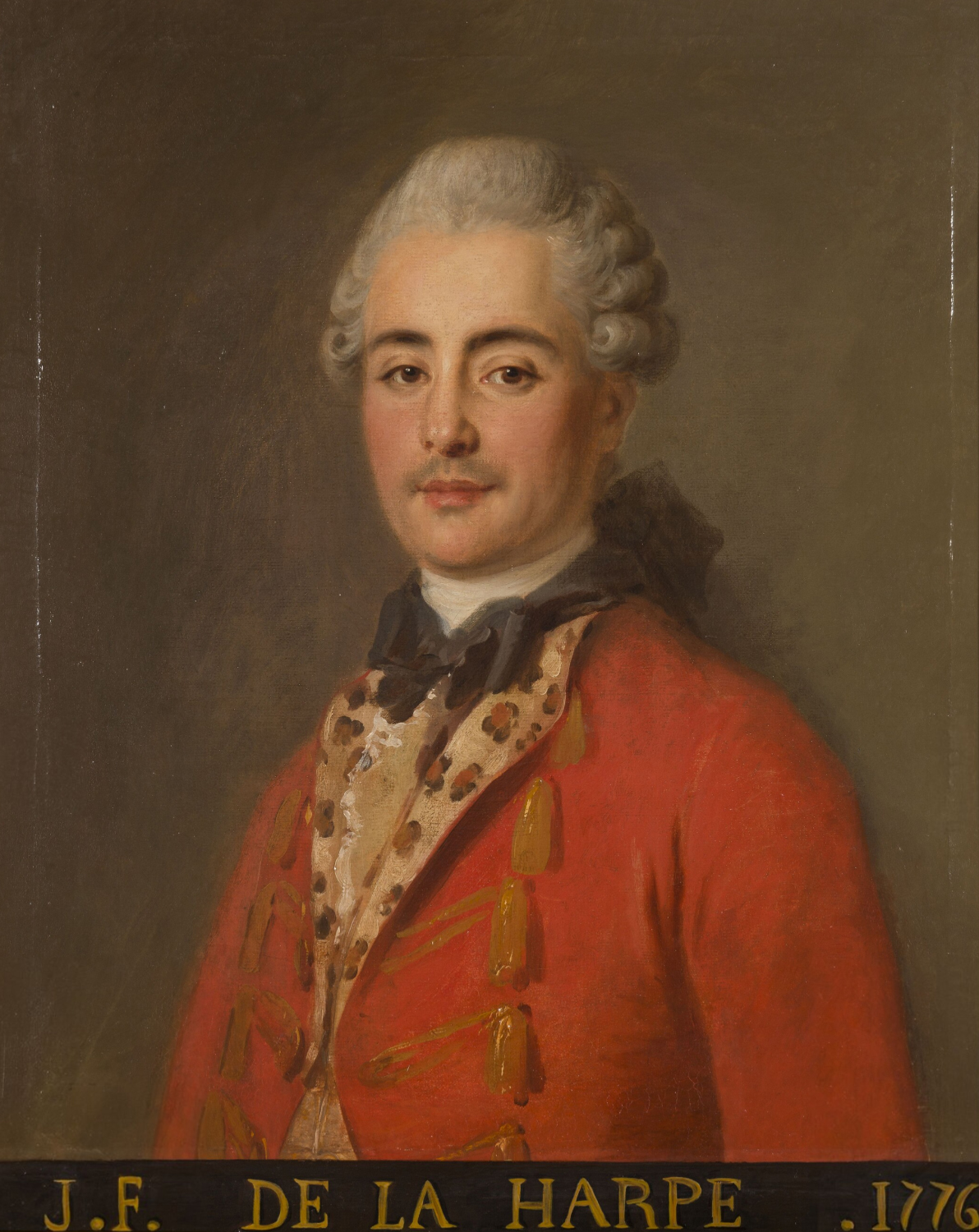
- Born: Jean François la Harpe; 20 November 1739; Paris, Kingdom of France
- Died: 11 February 1803 (aged 63); Paris, France
- Occupations: Playwright; Literary critic

Jean-François de La Harpe (French: [ʒɑ̃ fʁɑ̃swa də la aʁp]; 20 November 1739 – 11 February 1803) was a French playwright, writer and literary critic.

== Life ==
La Harpe was born in Paris of poor parents. His father, who signed himself Delharpe, was a descendant of a noble family originally of Vaud. Left an orphan at the age of nine, La Harpe was taken care of for six months by the Sisters of Charity, and his education was provided for by a scholarship at the Collège d'Harcourt, now known as the Lycée Saint-Louis. When nineteen he was imprisoned for some months on the charge of having written a satire against his protectors at the college. He was imprisoned at For-l'Évêque. La Harpe always denied his guilt, but this culminating misfortune of an early life spent entirely in the position of a dependent possibly had something to do with the bitterness he evinced in later life.

In 1763, his tragedy of Warwick was played before the court. This, his first play, was perhaps the best he ever wrote. The many authors whom he afterwards offended were always able to observe that the critic's own plays did not reach the standard of excellence he set up. Timoleon (1764) and Pharamond (1765) were box-office and critical failures. Mélanie was a better play, but was never represented. The success of Warwick led to a correspondence with Voltaire, who conceived a high opinion of La Harpe, even allowing him to correct his verses.

In 1764, La Harpe married the daughter of a coffee house keeper. This marriage, which proved very unhappy and was dissolved, did not improve his position. They were very poor, and for some time were guests of Voltaire at Ferney. When, after Voltaire's death, La Harpe in his praise of the philosopher ventured on some reasonable, but rather ill-timed, criticism of individual works, he was accused of treachery to one who had been his constant friend.

In 1768, he returned from Ferney to Paris, where he began to write for the Mercure de France. He was a born fighter and had little mercy on the authors whose work he handled. But he was himself violently attacked, and suffered under many epigrams, especially those of Lebrun-Pindare. No more striking proof of the general hostility can be given than his reception in 1776 at the Académie française, which Sainte-Beuve calls his "execution". Marmontel, who received him, used the occasion to eulogize La Harpe's predecessor, Charles-Pierre Colardeau, especially for his pacific, modest and indulgent disposition. The speech was punctuated by the applause of the audience, who chose to regard it as a series of sarcasms on the new member.

Eventually La Harpe was compelled to resign from the Mercure, which he had edited from 1770. On the stage he produced Les Barmecides (1778), Philoctete, Jeanne de Naples (1781), Les Brames (1783), Coriolan (1784), Virginie (1786). In 1786, he began delivering a course of literature at the newly established Lycée. In these lectures, published as the Cours de littérature ancienne et moderne, La Harpe is considered to have been at his best, finding a standpoint more or less independent of contemporary polemics. He is said to have been inexact in dealing with the ancients and that he had only a superficial knowledge of the Middle Ages, but he was excellent in his analysis of seventeenth-century writers. Sainte-Beuve found La Harpe to be the best critic of the French school of tragedy.

La Harpe was a disciple of the "philosophes", supporting their extreme party through the excesses of 1792 and 1793. In 1793, he returned to edit the Mercure de France, which blindly adhered to the revolutionary leaders. Nonetheless, in April 1794, La Harpe was seized as a "suspect". In prison he underwent a spiritual crisis which he described in convincing language, emerging an ardent Catholic and a political reactionary. When he resumed his chair at the Lycée, he attacked his former friends in politics and literature. He was sufficiently imprudent to begin the publication of his 1774-1791 Correspondance littéraire in 1801 with the grand-duke (and later emperor) Paul of Russia. In these letters he surpassed the brutalities of the Mercure.

He contracted a second marriage, which was dissolved after a few weeks by his wife. He died on 11 February 1803 in Paris, leaving in his will an incongruous exhortation to his fellow countrymen to maintain peace and concord. Among his posthumous works was a Prophétie de Cazotte, which Sainte-Beuve pronounced his best work. It is a somber description of a dinner-party of notables long before the Revolution, in which Jacques Cazotte is made to prophesy the frightful fates awaiting the various individuals of the company.

Among his works not already mentioned are: Commentaire sur Racine (1795–1796), published in 1807; Commentaire sur le théâtre de Voltaire of earlier date (published posthumously in 1814); and an epic poem La Religion (1814). His Cours de littérature has been often reprinted; a notice by Pierre Daunou prefixes the 1825–1826 edition.

=== Works ===
La Harpe wrote numerous plays, of which almost all are completely forgotten. Only Warwick and Philoctetes, imitated from Sophocles, had some success.

A particular mention must be made of Mélanie, ou les Vœux forcés, that the author had printed in 1770 but which was not played before 7 December 1791 at the Théâtre français. It remains, according to Jacques Truchet, "the most curious of his plays and the most representative of the spirit of the times." The topic - forced wishes - could suit anticlericalism that La Harpe showed when he composed this piece but much less censorship of the time, which is why it was played after the French Revolution. Although presented as a play in three acts and verse, Melanie approached the drama that would experience the fortune that we know at the end of the eighteenth.

This comparison is all the more pungent than La Harpe had always professed the greatest contempt for drama, which he violently attacked in his comedy Molière à la nouvelle salle, written in defense of the Comédie-Française against competitor theaters.

Moreover, his Correspondance littéraire addressed to Grand duke Paul I of Russia is full of theatrical anecdotes about the actors and plays of his time.

- 1763: Le Comte de Warwick (Théâtre-Français, 7 November 1763)
- 1764: Timoléon (Théâtre-Français, 1 August)
- 1765: Pharamond
- 1770: Mélanie, ou les Vœux forcés
- 1774: Olinde et Sophronie
- 1775: Menzicoff, ou les Exilés (Fontainebleau, November)
- 1778: Les Barmécides (Théâtre-Français, 11 July. it was performed eleven times only Voltaire reportedly told the author: "My friend, it is not worth anything, never will tragedy happen that way".
- 1779: Les Muses rivales, ou l’Apothéose de Voltaire (comédie en 1 acte et en vers libres, créée au Théâtre-Français 1 February 1779)
- 1781: Jeanne de Naples, 12 December)
- 1782: Molière à la nouvelle salle, ou les Audiences de Thalie, 12 April, comedy in 1 act and in verse
- 1783: Philoctète, 16 June
- 1784: Coriolan, 2 March
- 1786: Virginie, 11 July

=== Critiques ===
La Harpe's main work is his Lycée ou Cours de littérature (1799), which brings in 18 volumes of lessons he had given for twelve years in high school. It is a monument of literary criticism. Even if some parts are low - that on ancient philosophers in particular - everything that is said about the drama of Corneille to Voltaire, is beautifully thought out and reasoned, even if the thinking and reasoning is that of a purist and often picky. The passages on contemporary authors, in which La Harpe attacks vigorously the philosophical party, are often very funny.

- 1795–1796: Commentaire sur Racine, published in 1807
- 1796: De la Guerre déclarée par nos nouveaux tyrans à la raison, à la morale, aux lettres et aux arts
- 1797: Réfutation du livre de l’Esprit (d’Helvétius)
- 1797: Du Fanatisme dans la langue révolutionnaire, ou de la Persécution suscitée par les barbares du XVIIIe contre la religion chrétienne et ses ministres
- 1798–1804: Lycée, ou, Cours de littérature ancienne et moderne. Tome premier; Tome second; Tome troisième; Tome quatrième; Tome cinquieme; Tome sixieme; Tome septième; Tome neuvième; Tome dixième; Tome onzieme; `Tome douzième; Tome treizième; Tome quatorzième; Tome quinzième; Tome seizième, 18 vol.

=== Musical Settings ===
- French composer Augustine Renaud d`Allen (1789-after 1821) used La Harpe’s text in her composition Six Ancient French Airs.
- French composer Benjamin Godard (1849-1895) set La Harpe’s text to music in his song “O Ma Tendre Musette Mes Amours.”

=== Varia ===
- L’Alétophile ou l’ami de la Vérité (1758)
- Héroïdes nouvelles, précédées d’un essai sur l’héroïde en général (1759)
- Le Philosophe des Alpes. Ode qui a concouru pour le Prix de l'Académie Françoise en 1762 (1762)
- La Délivrance de Salerne et la fondation du royaume des Deux-Siciles (1765)
- Mélanges littéraires ou épîtres et pièces philosophiques (1765)
- Le Poëte (epistle, crowned by the Académie française)
- Éloge de Charles V (crowned by the Académie française)
- Des Malheurs de la guerre et des avantages de la paix (1767) (speech, crowned by the Académie française)
- Eloge de Henri IV, Roi de France (1769)
- Éloge de François de Salignac de La Motte-Fénelon, archevèque-duc de Cambray, précepteur des enfans de France (1771) (crowned by the Académie française)
- Éloge de Racine (1772)
- La navigation (1773)
- Éloge de La Fontaine (1774)
- Eloge de Nicolas de Catinat, Maréchal de France (1775)
- Conseils à un jeune poète (1775)
- Éloge de Voltaire (1780)
- Tangu et Filine, poème érotique (1780)
- Abrégé de l’histoire générale des voyages, 32 parts (1780) (see: https://archive.org/search?query=%27%27Abr%C3%A9g%C3%A9+de+l%E2%80%99histoire+g%C3%A9n%C3%A9rale+des+voyages)
- Réponse d’un solitaire de La Trappe à la lettre de l’abbé de Rancé (1780)
- Le Salut public, ou la Vérité dite à la Convention (1794)
- Acte de garantie pour la liberté individuelle, la sûreté du domicile, et la liberté de la presse (1794)
- Oui ou Non (1795)
- La liberté de la Presse, défendue par La Harpe, contre Chénier (1795)
- De l'Etat des Lettres en Europe, depuis la fin du siècle qui a suivi celui d'Auguste, jusqu'au règne de Louis XIV (1797)
- Le Pseautier en français, traduction nouvelle, avec des notes... précédée d’un discours sur l’esprit des Livres saints et le style des prophètes (1797)
- Correspondance littéraire adressée a son altesse impériale mgr. le grand-duc, aujoud'hui empereur de Russie, et a m. le comte André Schowalow, chambellan de l'impératrice Catherine II. Tome premier; Tome second; Tome troisième; Tome quatrième, (1801-1807)
- Le Camaldule (1802)
- Le Triomphe de la religion, ou le Roi martyr (1814)
- Commentaire sur le théâtre de Voltaire (1814)
- Prédiction de Cazotte, faite en 1788 (1817)
- Les Ruines, ou Voyage en France

== Bibliography ==
- Émile Faguet, Histoire de la poésie française, volume IX, Paris, 1935
- Gabriel Peignot, Recherches historiques, bibliographiques et littéraires sur La Harpe, 1820
- Christopher Todd, Voltaire’s disciple : Jean-François de La Harpe, London, 1972
- Jacques Truchet, Théâtre du XVIIIe, Paris, Gallimard, bibl. de la Pléiade, 1974, vol. II, (p. 1488—1492)
- Chateaubriand, Mémoires d'Outre-Tombe, Tome 2, livre 14.
- Gabrielli, Domenico (2002), Dictionnaire historique du cimetière du Père-Lachaise XVIIIe XIXe (in French), Paris: éd. de l'Amateur, p. 334, ISBN 2859173463, OCLC 49647223
