= Marie Schauff =

German composer (fl. 1799–1844)

Marie Schauff (fl. 1799–1844) was a German composer of harpsichord and vocal music. She studied piano with Friedrich Kalkbrenner (1785–1849) and set poems by Nikolaus Lenau (1802–1850) to music. Her works were published by Anton Diabelli & Company (1824–1858). They are archived in the Osterreichische Nationalbibliotek in Vienna, and include:

== Harpsichord ==
- Variazioni per il clavicembalo (harpsichord) 1799

== Vocal ==
- “Die Kraft im Gebeth”
- “Gedichte von Lenau” opus 3 (text by Nikolaus Lenau) 1844
- “Lust und Schmerz” 1842
- “Sehnsucht” opus 2 1842
