= Augustine Renaud d'Allen =

French author, composer and educator

Augustine Renaud d’Allen de Grammont (1789 - after 1821) was a French author, composer, music educator and singer. She is best known for her book Principles of Music.

Grammont was born in Paris to an unspecified noble family. She studied music theory, piano and voice with Louis Adam at the Paris Conservatory, where she received a first prize.

In 1817, Grammont opened two music schools in Paris based on her book Principles of Music. One school met on Mondays, Wednesdays, and Fridays at 4 Rue Chariot (Quartier du Marais). The other school met on Tuesdays, Thursdays, and Saturdays at 3 Rue du Cherche-Midi (Faubourg Saint-Germain). The Italian violinist and composer Giovanni Battista Viotti visited one of Grammont's schools around 1820 and praised it, noting that “the successes of such an institution are due to the excellence of the method applied." Grammont stopped teaching after her marriage in 1821, but continued composing works for piano and voice through at least opus 22. Spanish composer Narciso Paz dedicated his Collection d'Airs Espagnols to A. Renaud d’Allen (among others).

Grammont's works were published by A. Masclet, Chez L’Auteur, Henry Lemonine, and Schott Music. They included:

== Book ==
- Principles of Music

== Chamber ==
- Duo Concertant, opus 22 (violin or flute and piano)

== Piano ==
- La Perle de Villiers Polka-Mazurka
- Romances
- Thême Varié

== Voice ==
- “Approche, Jeune Déité” (text by Charles Victor Prévot)
- “Madame de Lavallière Romance (arranged by Jean Antoine Meissonnier)
- Nocturne a Deux Voix
- Six Ancient French Airs (two voices and piano or harp; texts by Jean Bertaut, Alexandre Deleyre, and Jean-François de La Harpe)
- “Vous Qui Connûtes les Malheurs!” (text by Charles Victor Prévot)
