= Jean Bertaut =

French poet

- Bishop of Sées
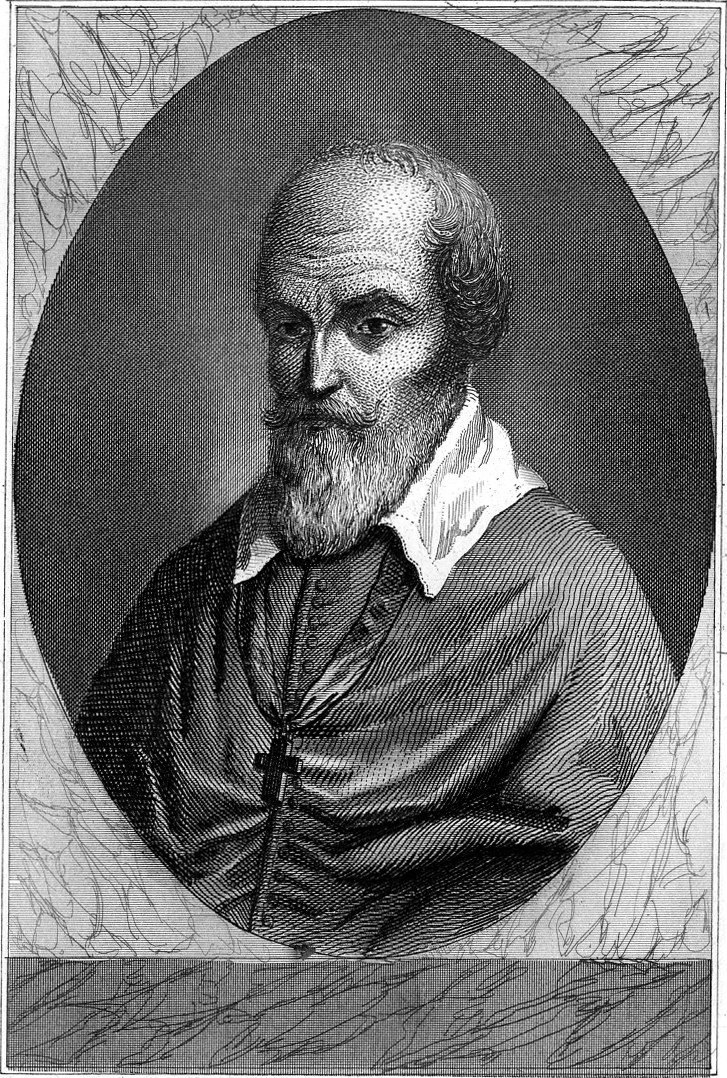
- Church: Catholic Church
- Diocese: Diocese of Sées
- In office: 5 March 1607 – 8 June 1611
- Predecessor: Claude de Morenne
- Successor: Jacques Suares

Orders
- Consecration: 11 November 1607 by Paul Hurault de L'Hospital

Personal details
- Born: 1552 Donnay, Normandy, Kingdom of France
- Died: 8 June 1611 (aged 58–59) Sées, Normandy, Kingdom of France

Jean Bertaut (1552 – 8 June 1611), French poet, was born in Donnay, near Caen.

== Life ==
He figures with Philippe Desportes in the disdainful couplet of Boileau on Ronsard:

"Ce poëte orgueilleux, trébuché de si haut,
Rendit plus retenus Desportes et Bertaut."

He wrote light verse to celebrate the incidents of court life in the manner of Desportes, but his verse is more fantastic and fuller of conceits than his master's. He early entered the church, and had a share in the conversion of Henry IV, a circumstance which assured his career. He was successively councillor of the parlement of Grenoble, secretary to the king, almoner to Marie de' Medici, abbot of the Abbey of Aunay-sur-Odon and finally, in 1606, bishop of Sées.

After his elevation to the bishopric he ceased to produce the light verse in which he excelled, though his scruples did not prevent him from preparing a new edition of his Recueil de quelques vers amoureux (1602) in 1606. The serious poems in which he celebrated the public events of his later years are dull and lifeless. Bertaut died at Sées on 8 June 1611. His works were edited by Adolphe Chenevière in 1891.

French composer Augustine Renaud d`Allen used Bertaut’s text in her composition Six Ancient French Airs.

== Sources ==
- Fisquet, Honoré (1864). La France pontificale. Métropole de Rouen. Séez. (in French). Volume 14. Paris: E.Repos 1864. Pp. 56-59.

Attribution
