= Justin Cadaux =

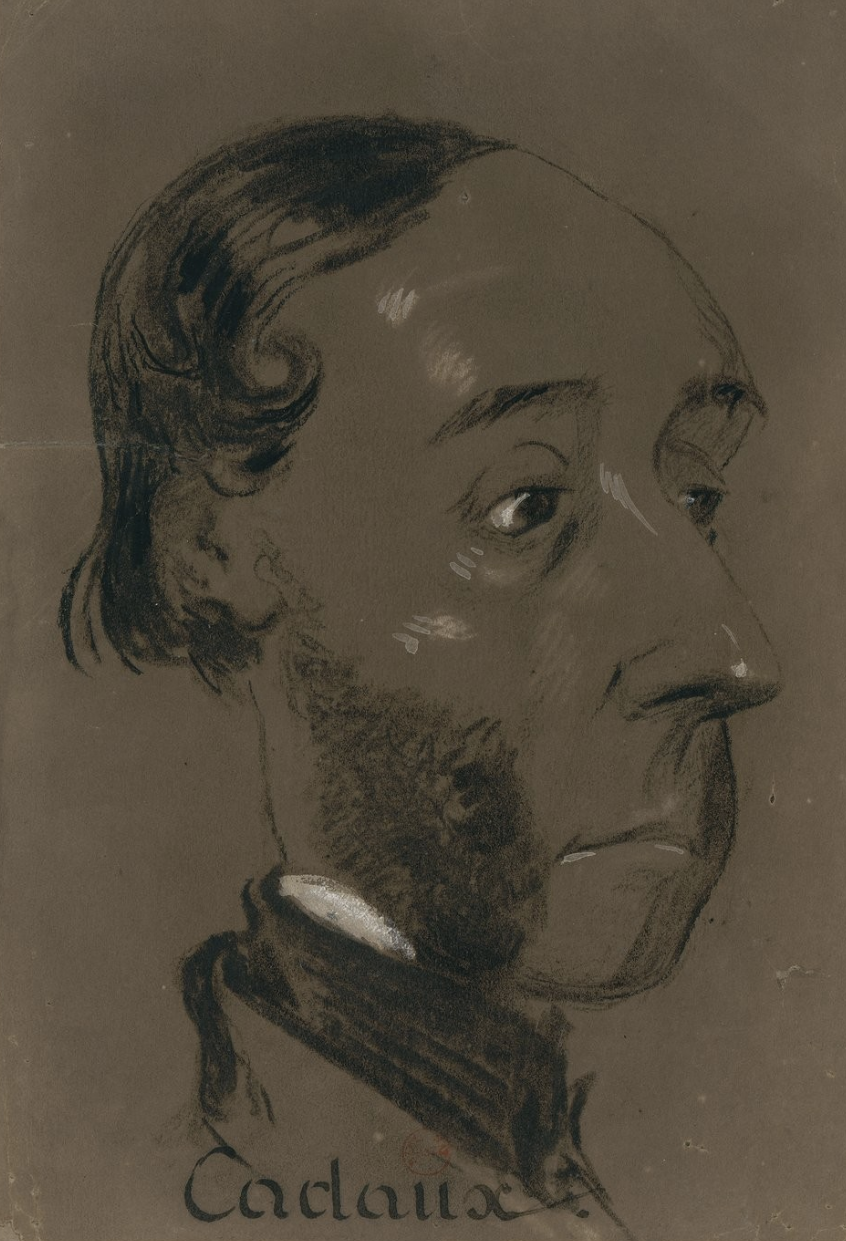
Caricature of Justin Cadaux by Nadar

Justin Cadaux (13 April 1813 in Albi, France – 8 November 1874 in Paris) was a French organist, the composer of sixty-five known works including six comic operas, and a student of the Conservatoire de Paris.
