= Louis Adam =

French composer

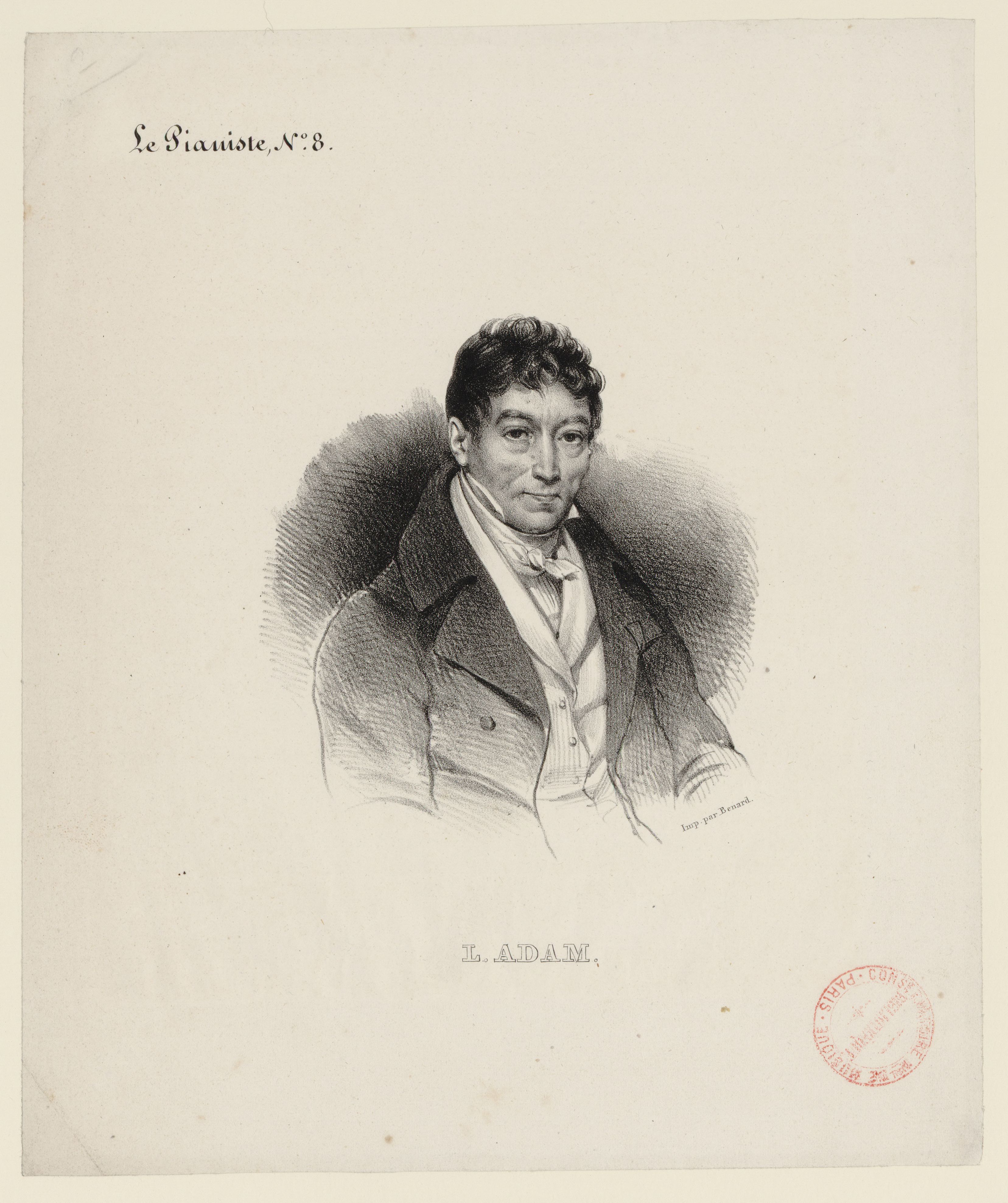
- Born: Johann Ludwig Adam; 3 December 1758; Muttersholtz, Alsace, France
- Died: 8 April 1848 (aged 89); Paris, France
- Other name: Jean-Louis Adam
- Occupations: pianist; music professor; composer
- Children: 3, including Adolphe Adam

Louis Adam or Jean-Louis Adam (born Johann Ludwig Adam) (3 December 1758 – 8 April 1848) was a French composer, music teacher, and piano virtuoso.

== Life and career ==
Born in Muttersholtz, Alsace, the son of Mathias Adam and Marie-Dorothée Meyer, Adam taught himself violin and harp without a teacher, before going to Paris in 1775 to study piano and harpsichord with Jean-Frédéric Edelmann. Shortly after he wrote two concertante symphonies for harp, piano and violin, which were performed at a Concert Spirituel. He spent over four decades, from 1797 through 1842, as Professor of Pianoforte at the Conservatoire de Paris, retiring in 1842 (at age 84), and died in the city, aged 89. As professor, he was the teacher of a number of notable students, including Joseph Daussoigne-Méhul, Friedrich Kalkbrenner, Ferdinand Hérold, Henry Lemoine, Augustine Renaud d`Allen and Jean-Baptiste Bréval.

In addition to being a skilled pianist, he composed a number of piano pieces that were in vogue at the time, especially some variations on Le Bon roi Dagobert. He also wrote two standard instruction books for piano: Méthode ou principe générale du doigté pour le forté-piano (1798) and Méthode nouvelle pour le piano (1802). In 1804, he published the Méthode de piano du Conservatoire, an influential work, which contributed to the advancement of piano technique in Paris.

Adam was married three times. His second wife was the sister of the Count de Louvois; the couple had a daughter, Sophie, later married to Colonel Genot. After his separation, Adam remarried to Élisabeth-Charlotte-Jeanne (known as Élisa) Coste, daughter of a doctor. The couple had two boys, Adolphe Charles Adam (1803) (future popular composer, author of the ballet Giselle, the comic opera The Postillon of Lonjumeau, and the Christmas carol Midnight, Christians) and Alphonse Hippolyte Adam (1808).
