= Friedrich Kalkbrenner =

German pianist and composer

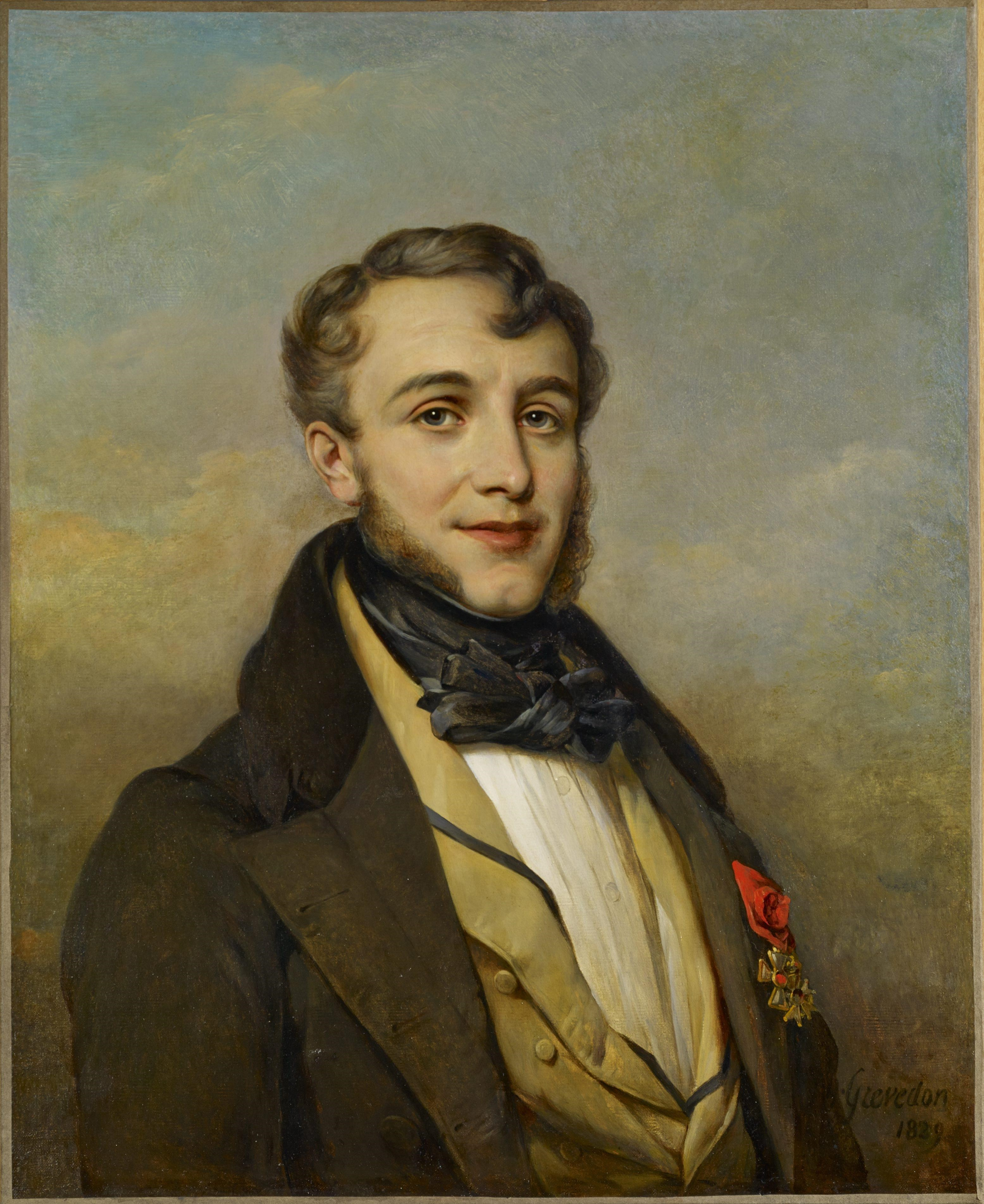
Kalkbrenner by Henri Grévedon, 1829

Friedrich Wilhelm Michael Kalkbrenner (7 November 1785 – 10 June 1849), also known as Frédéric Kalkbrenner, was a pianist, composer, piano teacher and piano manufacturer. German by birth, Kalkbrenner studied at the Conservatoire de Paris, starting at a young age and eventually settled in Paris, where he lived until his death in 1849. Kalkbrenner composed more than 200 piano works, as well as many piano concertos and operas.

When Frédéric Chopin came to Paris, Kalkbrenner suggested that Chopin could benefit by studying in one of Kalkbrenner's schools. It was not until the late 1830s that Kalkbrenner's reputation was surpassed by the likes of Chopin, Thalberg and Liszt. Author of a famous method of piano playing (1831) which was in print until the late 19th century, he ran in Paris what is sometimes called a "factory for aspiring virtuosos" and taught scores of pupils from as far away as Cuba. His pupils included Marie Pleyel, Marie Schauff, and Camille-Marie Stamaty. Through Stamaty, Kalkbrenner's piano method was passed on to Louis Moreau Gottschalk and Camille Saint-Saëns.

He was one of the few composers to achieve financial success. Chopin dedicated his first piano concerto to him. Kalkbrenner created transcriptions of Beethoven's nine symphonies for solo piano which were published by Giovanni Canti from 1842-1844; decades before Liszt did the same.

== Biography ==
=== Descent and parents ===
Friedrich Wilhelm Kalkbrenner was the son of Christian Kalkbrenner and an unidentified mother. Kalkbrenner was born, allegedly in a post chaise, during a trip his mother made from Kassel to Berlin. His birth was consequently unable to be registered with the authorities, and hence the exact date of his birth was not recorded. Kalkbrenner's father was going to be appointed Kapellmeister to Frederica Louisa of Hesse-Darmstadt, Queen Consort of Prussia, in 1786. Thus, it is possible that Kalkbrenner's mother was on the way from Hesse to Berlin to join her husband, who would shortly take up his new duties at the court of Potsdam.

=== 1785–1798: Childhood and first education in Berlin ===
Kalkbrenner's father was his first teacher. By the time he was six he played a piano concerto by Joseph Haydn to the Queen of Prussia. When he was eight he spoke four languages fluently. Although his education took place in Potsdam and Rheinsberg castle, Kalkbrenner retained the heavy Berliner argot, characteristic of working-class people to this day, for the rest of his life.

=== 1798–1802: At the Conservatoire de Paris ===
At the end of 1798, Kalkbrenner was enrolled at the Paris Conservatoire. He was in the piano class of Alsatian pianist and composer Louis Adam, father of the now more famous opera composer Adolphe Adam. Louis Adam was for 45 years the most influential professor for piano at the Paris Conservatory. According to French pianist and piano professor Antoine François Marmontel he put his pupils to work on great masters like Bach, Handel, Scarlatti, Haydn, Mozart, and Clementi – at that time a notable exception among piano teachers. In harmony and composition he was taught by Charles Simon Catel. Kalkbrenner was a fellow student of opera and ballet composer Ferdinand Hérold and did well at his studies. In 1799 (Published in 1800), he won second prize for piano (Pierre-Joseph-Guillaume Zimmerman came in first), in the following year first prize. When he left Paris at the end of 1802 for Vienna to continue his studies, Kalkbrenner was not yet a finished artist, but he could already look back on a solidly musical education from recognised masters in their own fields.

=== 1803–1806: Studies in Vienna and concert tours in Germany ===
In the latter half of 1803, Kalkbrenner travelled to Vienna to continue with his education. In Vienna he took counterpoint lessons from Antonio Salieri and Johann Georg Albrechtsberger. Besides taking lessons in counterpoint he met Haydn, Beethoven and Hummel, playing duets with the latter.

In 1805 and the year thereafter Kalkbrenner appeared as concert pianist in Berlin, Munich, and Stuttgart.

=== 1814–1823: Pianist, teacher and businessman in London ===
From 1814 to 1823 Kalkbrenner lived in England. He gave many concerts, composed and established himself as a successful piano teacher. In England Kalkbrenner encountered the chiroplast or "hand guide", an invention made by Johann Bernhard Logier consisting of two parallel rails of mahogany wood that were placed on two feet and loosely attached to the piano. The chiroplast restricted vertical motions of the arms, thereby helping nascent pianists to attain the (perceived) correct position of the hands. Camille Saint-Saëns, who was put to work with it as a boy, describes it:

"The preface to Kalkbrenner's method, in which he relates the beginnings of his invention, is exceedingly interesting. This invention consisted of a rod placed in front of the keyboard. The forearm rested on this rod in such a way that all muscular action save that of the hand was suppressed. This system is excellent for teaching the young pianist how to play pieces written for the harpsichord or the first pianofortes where the keys responded to slight pressure; but it is inadequate for modern works and instruments."

In 1817, Logier teamed up with Kalkbrenner to found an academy where music theory and piano playing were taught using the chiroplast. The proceeds from the patent made Kalkbrenner a wealthy man. In 1821, Ignaz Moscheles had also settled in London. His playing had a great influence on Kalkbrenner, who used his time in London to hone his technical skills.

=== 1823–1824: Concerts in Austria and Germany ===
In 1823 and 1824, Kalkbrenner gave concerts in Frankfurt, Leipzig, Dresden, Berlin, Prague, and Vienna. During the same period, he composed a variation on a waltz by Anton Diabelli for Vaterländischer Künstlerverein.

=== 1825–1849: Pianist, teacher and piano manufacturer in Paris ===
Kalkbrenner returned to Paris a rich man. Here he became a partner in Pleyel's piano factory, which by the time of Kalkbrenner's death (1849) had risen to a place second only to Erard in prestige and output.

In the 1830s Kalkbrenner was at the pinnacle of his pianistic powers and his virtuosity aroused the greatest enthusiasm in the years 1833, 1834, and 1836 on his trips to Hamburg, Berlin, Brussels, and other places. After the arrival of Liszt and Thalberg, Kalkbrenner's fame was on the wane.

In the winter of 1831, Frédéric Chopin considered becoming Kalkbrenner's pupil. Kalkbrenner, though, had demanded that Chopin study three years with him. Chopin's deliberations, whether he should or should not study with Kalkbrenner, caused a flurry of letters between Chopin and Kalkbrenner:

Warsaw, 27 November 1831, Józef Elsner (Chopin's composition teacher) to Chopin in Paris: "I was pleased to see, by your letter, that Kalkbrenner, the first of pianists, as you call him, gave you such a friendly reception. [...] I am very glad that he has agreed to initiate you into the mysteries of his art, but it astonishes me to hear that he requires three years to do so. Did he think the first time he saw and heard you, that you needed all that time to accustom yourself to his method? or that you wished to devote your musical talents to the piano alone, and to confine your compositions to that instrument?"

Paris, 14 December 1831, Chopin to Józef Elsner in Warsaw: "Three years of study is a great deal too much', as Kalkbrenner himself perceived after he had heard me a few times. From this you can see, dear Mons. Elsner, that the true virtuoso does not know what envy is. I could make up my mind to study three years, if I felt certain that would secure the end I have in view. One thing is quite clear to my mind; I will never be a copy of Kalkbrenner.

Paris, 16 December 1831, Chopin to Titus Woyciechowski in Poland: "I wish I could say I play as well as Kalkbrenner, who is perfection in quite another style to Paganini. Kalkbrenner's fascinating touch, the quietness and equality of his playing, are indescribable; every note proclaims the master. He is truly a giant, who dwarfs all other artists. (...) I was very much amused by Kalkbrenner, who, in playing to me, made a mistake which brought him to a standstill; but the way in which he recovered himself was marvellous. Since this meeting we have seen each other every day; either he comes to me, or I go to him. He offered to take me as a pupil for three years, and to make a great artist of me. I replied that I knew very well what were my deficiencies; but I did not wish to imitate him, and that three years were too much for me."

Kalkbrenner died in 1849 in Enghien-les-Bains from cholera, which he attempted to treat himself.

== Notable pupils ==
- Cornelius Ábrányi (1822–1903): Hungarian pianist and composer and a lifelong friend of Franz Liszt, was Kalkbrenner's pupil from 1843 until 1844. During the same time he also had lessons from Chopin. In 1845 he returned to his native Hungary to devote himself to composition and the buildup of the Hungarian national school of composition.
- Arabella Goddard (1836–1922): English pianist. She began to study with Kalkbrenner at the age of 6 and also had lessons from Sigismond Thalberg. She made tours of Germany and Italy (1854–55); later toured the U.S., Australia, and India (1873–76). Harold C. Schonberg calls her the most important British pianist from 1853 until 1890. At her London debut (1853) she played Beethoven's Hammerklavier Sonata from memory.
- Ignace Leybach (1817–1891): Alsatian pianist and composer. He studied in Paris with Pixis, Kalkbrenner, and Chopin; in 1844 he became organist at the cathedral of Toulouse.
- Joseph O'Kelly (1828–1885): Irish composer and pianist born in Boulogne-sur-Mer, resident in Paris since c. 1835.
- George Alexander Osborne (1806–1893): Irish pianist and composer, born in Limerick and died in London, lived in Paris for about 15 years until 1844.
- Marie-Félicité-Denise Pleyel (1811–1875): was a pianist with a German mother and a Belgian father. She studied with Henri Herz, Ignaz Moscheles, and Kalkbrenner. From 1848 to 1872 she was professor of piano at the Brussels Conservatory.
- Ludwig Schuncke (1810–1834): German pianist. He studied with his father, the horn player Gottfried Schuncke (1777–1840). From there he went to Paris, where he was a pupil of Kalkbrenner and Anton Reicha. He settled in Leipzig in 1833, and became the intimate friend of Robert Schumann. He was co-founder of the Neue Zeitschrift für Musik.
- Camille-Marie Stamaty (1811–1870): French pianist, teacher and composer of piano music and studies (études). He was one of the preeminent piano teachers in 19th century Paris. His most famous pupils were Louis Moreau Gottschalk and Camille Saint-Saëns.
- Thomas Tellefsen (1823–1874): Norwegian pianist and composer. In 1842 he went to Paris, where he studied with Kalkbrenner. In 1844 he became a pupil of Chopin, and accompanied him to England and Scotland in 1848. He published an edition of Chopin's works, and played Chopin's music at recitals in Paris and in Scandinavia.

Through Arabella Goddard and Camille Saint-Saëns – who studied with Kalkbrenner's star product Camille-Marie Stamaty – Kalkbrenner's influence reached well into the first half of the 20th century.

== Sources ==
- Chopin, Frédéric. Chopin's Letters. Unabridged and slightly corrected Dover Reprint (1988) of the original Knopf Edition. Edited by E.L. Voynich. New York: Alfred A. Knopf, 1931. ISBN 0-486-25564-6
- Gottschalk, Louis Moreau. Notes of a Pianist. Reprint of the 1964 edition, ed. Jeanne Behrend, with a New Foreword by S. Frederick Starr. Princeton: Princeton University Press, 2006. ISBN 0-691-12716-6
- Hallé, C.E. Hallé and Marie. Life and Letters of Sir Charles Hallé. London (GB): Smith, Elder, & Co., 1896.
- Heine, Heinrich. The Works of Heinrich Heine. Translated by Charles Godfrey Leland (Hans Breitmann). Vol. 4. London: William Heinemann, 1893.
- Hiller, Ferdinand. Erinnerungsblätter (Leaves of Remembrance). Köln (Cologne), 1884.
- Karasowski, Moritz. Frédéric Chopin: His Life and Letters. London: William Reeves, 1881? New Edition: ISBN 1-113-72791-8
- Liszt, Franz. Letters of Franz Liszt. Edited by La Mara. Translated by Constance Bache. Vol. 1 From Paris to Rome. Covent Garden: H. Grevel & Co., 1894.
- Litzmann, Berthold, ed. Clara Schumann. An Artist's Life. Translated by Grace E. Hadow. Vol. 1. 2 vols. London: Macmillan & Co., 1913.
- Marmontel, Antoine Francois. Les Pianistes célèbres. Paris: Imprimerie Centrale des Chemins de Fer A. Chaix et Cie, 1878.
- Nicholas, Jeremy. Liner Notes to Hyperion CD recording of Kalkbrenner Piano Concertos No. 1, Op. 61 and No. 4, Op. 127. Published by Hyperion Records Ltd., London, 2006.
- Saint-Saëns, Camille. Musical Memoirs. Translated by Edward Gile Rich. Boston: Small, Maynard & Company, 1919.
- Saint-Saëns, Camille. Musical Memoirs. Newly annotated edition by Roger Nichols. Oxford (GB): Oxford University Press 2008. ISBN 0-19-532016-6
- Schonberg, Harold C. The Great Pianists. Revised and Updated Edition. New York: Simon & Schuster, 1984.
- Slonimsky, Nicolas, ed. Baker's Biographical Dictionary of Musicians. 5th Edition. New York: Schirmer, 1958.
- Starr, S. Frederick. Bamboula: The Life and Times of Louis Moreau Gottschalk. New York: Oxford University Press, 1995 ISBN 0-19-507237-5
- Walther Killy, Rudolf Vierhaus, (ed.) Deutsche Biographische Enzyklopäde (German Biographic Encyclopaedia). Bde. (Vol.) 5. K-G. 10 Vols. Munich: K. G. Saur, 1999. ISBN 3-598-23186-5
- Weitzmann, C. F. A History of Pianoforte-Playing. 2nd augmented and revised edition. Translated by Dr. Th. Baker. New York: G. Schirmer, 1897.
