= Christian Kalkbrenner =

German violinist (1755–1806)

Christian Kalkbrenner (Hann. Münden, September 22, 1755 – Paris, August 10, 1806) was a German Kapellmeister, violinist, organ and keyboard player, and composer. Almost an exact contemporary of Wolfgang Amadeus Mozart, he was a prolific composer in many fields and a force in the musical world. He rose to high honours at the courts of the Prussian Kings. For unknown reasons, Kalkbrenner left his position as Kapellmeister to Prince Henry of Prussia and went first to Naples and later on to Paris. He was the father of Friedrich Wilhelm Kalkbrenner, one of the great piano virtuosos of the first half of the 19th century.

== Biography ==
Christian Kalkbrenner was born in Münden, Germany. Münden, nowadays called Hann. Münden, an old town with a historic inner city, is situated 17 kilometres north-east of Kassel. Kalkbrenner had his first musical education from his father who was town musician (Stadtmusikus) in the Hessian town of Kassel. Kalkbrenner learned to play violin and organ. In violin he was taught by Carl Rodewald; his organ teacher was Johannes Becker (born 1726), the Hessian court organist. By the time he was seventeen Kalkbrenner sang in the choir of the French opera house of Kassel where he also played the violin.

In 1777 he dedicated a symphony to Frederick II, Landgrave of Hesse-Cassel. In 1784 Kalkbrenner was received into the Philharmonic Academy of Bologna by virtue of a four-part mass he had mailed to the society. This was a very high honour and suggests the high quality of Kalkbrenner's compositions. Mozart had been received into the same society on 9 October 1770 only after a lengthy examination in which he was aided by Padre Martini. In the same year Kalkbrenner married the socially well connected widow of an army captain who had died as a soldier in the United States.

In 1788 or 1789, some time after the death of landgrave Frederic II of Hesse, Kalkbrenner was named Kapellmeister of Frederika Louisa of Hesse-Darmstadt, Queen of Prussia. From 1790, Kalkbrenner served Prince Henry of Prussia at Rheinsberg castle in the same capacity. Henry of Prussia was the younger brother of Frederick II of Prussia.

In 1796 Kalkbrenner renounced all of his positions at the Rheinsberg court and left Germany for good. It is not clear why Kalkbrenner did this. Certainly this was a major step that required careful consideration. The Rheinsberg castle, situated about 100 kilometres to the north-west of Berlin, was something of a backwater in the late 18th century. The means of the court theatre, where Kalkbrenner staged his operas, were limited, the surroundings provincial, and the budget restricted. Nevertheless, this was a secure position with one of the major German princes, an enlightened philosopher-sovereign whom Friedrich Wilhelm von Steuben recommended to Alexander Hamilton as a candidate for the American Presidency. Henry's portrait as drawn by an eminent biographer of his older brother Frederick the Great is not unflattering:

"Like Frederick he (Prince Henry of Prussia) was a man of many and varied talents, cultivated, musical and intelligent. Like Frederick he established at Rheinsberg a brilliant court, rivalling the king's own. Like Frederick he was enchanted by France and things French – and, being without final responsibility, could indulge a prejudice in that direction without risk of it becoming mistaken for a policy.... Small in stature he was both charming and vain; and had a most attractive wife...whom he later deserted, caring little for her as a woman."

In 1796 the Kalkbrenner family surfaced in Italy where they stayed for two years. Naples was home to the famous Teatro di San Carlo, then one of the largest opera houses in the world, seating 3,300. This was still the great age of the Neapolitan Opera. Other German composers like Johann Adolph Hasse, Johann Christian Bach, and particularly Christoph Willibald Gluck had successfully preceded Kalkbrenner to Naples and there is reason to believe that he hoped to establish himself as a composer of Neapolitan operas there. However, no proof has yet established that he composed or staged an opera in Naples.

In 1799 Kalkbrenner made his way to Paris where he managed to become Maître des Chœurs et des Écoles at the Paris Opera. In 1803 he rearranged Mozart's Don Giovanni for the Paris Opera interpolating pieces he composed himself. Together with Ludwig Wenzel Lachnith, a Bohemian horn player and composer, he produced a number of infamous pasticcios for the Paris Opera. These were operas cobbled together using music from different composers, among them Mozart and Joseph Haydn. Jointly with Lachnith, Kalkbrenner staged Les Mystères d'Isis, (a botch that was justly parodied as Les Misères d'ici), a travesty of Mozart's Magic Flute, at the Paris Opera.

Kalkbrenner, having served at German courts where the court language was French, was probably bilingual or at least completely fluent in French. It is somewhat surprising, though, that Kalkbrenner attained this much coveted position in revolutionary France after spending most of his life at courts that were distinctly hostile to the French Revolution. Kalkbrenner died unexpectedly in 1806 in Paris. His death seems to have come as a great blow to his son who subsequently withdrew from the concert life and music in general for several years.

== Historical assessment ==
Christian Kalkbrenner was a very talented all-round musician and a good composer, well versed in all music matters. He must also have been a shrewd courtier who knew how to advance in the tight knit aristocratic society of the latter 18th century, where observing the etiquette and being on good terms with the right and influential people, most of them aristocrats, was what mattered most. Coming from a humble background (as the family name clearly suggests) and with Jewish roots, he rose within a relatively short time to one of the preeminent positions in 18th century musical Germany. Having spent his whole life at smaller European courts that were decidedly hostile towards the French Revolution, he nevertheless managed within a few years to attain a respected position in post-revolutionary France. He was the father and first teacher of Friedrich Wilhelm Kalkbrenner, one of the most famous and influential pianists and piano teachers in the first half of the 19th century.

== Works ==
Today there is little information on Kalkbrenner's works. Marmontel maintains that it was large.

=== Operas ===
- Démocrite, opera buffa, 3 acts, Rheinsberg 1792
- La Femme et le secret, opera, Rheinsberg
- Lanassa, grand opéra, Rheinsberg
- La Veuve du Malabar, opera, Rheinsberg
- La Descente des Français en Angleterre, opera in one act, (Italy?) 1798
- Olympie (Guillard), grand opéra in 3 acts, Paris 1798
- Scène de Pygmalion, scène avec orchestre, Paris 1799
- Scène tirée des poésies d'Ossian, Paris 1800

=== Other works ===
- 2 symphonies
- piano concerto
- piano sonatas
- oratorios, masses.
- Theorie der Tonkunst (1789)
- Kurzer Abriss der Geschichte der Tonkunst (1792).

== Sources ==
- Die Musik in Geschichte und Gegenwart. Allgemeine Enzyklopädie der Musik. (Ungekürzte elektronische Ausgabe der ersten Auflage). (1949–1987). München: Bärenreiter.
- Fraser, David. Frederick the Great. London: Penguin, 2000. ISBN 0-88064-261-0
- Marmontel, Antoine Francois. Les Pianistes Célèbres. Paris: Imprimerie Centrale des Chemins de Fer A. Chaix et Cie, 1878.
- Nicholas, Jeremy. Booklet of Hyperion CD recording of Kalkbrenner Piano Concertos No. 1, Op. 61 and No. 2, Op. 127. Published by Hyperion Records Ltd., Booklet Editor, Tim Parry. London, 2006. ASIN B000GPI26S
- Schenk, Erich. Mozart - Eine Biographie (Mozart - A Biography). Munich: Goldmann. No year given, probably 1978 (Original Edition Vienna, Amalthea, 1955). ISBN 3-442-33102-1
- Walther Killy, Rudolf Vierhaus. Deutsche Biographische Enzyklopäde (German Biographic Encyclopaedia). Bd. (Vol.) 5. K-G. 10 Bde. (Vols.) Munich: KG Saur, 1999. ISBN 3-598-23186-5

== External sources ==
- Fiche sur http://www.operone.de
