= Jean-Baptiste Vivien de Châteaubrun =

French dramatist and playwright

Jean-Baptiste Vivien de Châteaubrun (French pronunciation: [ʒɑ̃ batist vivjɛ̃ də ʃɑtobʁœ̃]; 1686 – 16 February 1775) was a French dramatist and a member of the Académie française. He was born and died in Angoulême.

He spent 40 years of his life polishing two plays, but his maid mistook them for wrapping paper, thus losing his life's work. Today, his work Les Troyennes (1734) survives.

== Bibliography ==
- Mahomet second, tragédie (1714)
- Les Troyennes, tragédie (1751)
- Philoctète, tragédie (1755)
- Astyanax, tragédie (1756)
- Шатобрэн, Жан-Батист-Вивьен
