= Malaparte (disambiguation) =

Curzio Malaparte (1898–1957) was an Italian writer, filmmaker, war correspondent and diplomat.

Malaparte may also refer to:

- Malaparte (theater company), a theatre company in New York City
- Malaparte: A Biography, a 2011 book by Maurizio Serra
- Malaparte. Morte come me, a 2016 novel by Monaldi & Sorti

== See also ==
- Casa Malaparte, a house on Capri
- Premio Malaparte, an Italian literary award
