= Secretum =

Secretum may refer to:

- Secretum (book), a book by Petrarch
- Secretum (Monaldi & Sorti), a book by Monaldi & Sorti
- Secretum (British Museum), the collection of obscene material held by the British Museum
- A sigillum secretum, a special seal used for private correspondence
