= Les Barricades Mystérieuses =

1717 piece by François Couperin

Les Barricades Mystérieuses (The Mysterious Barricades) is a piece of music that François Couperin composed for harpsichord in 1717. It is the fifth piece in his Ordre 6ème de clavecin in B-flat major, from his second book of collected harpsichord pieces (Pièces de Clavecin). It is emblematic of the style brisé characteristic of French Baroque keyboard music.

== Music ==
The work is in rondeau form, employing a variant of the traditional bergamasca in the bass in quadruple time rather than the usual triple time. In the view of Tom Service,

"The four parts create an ever-changing tapestry of melody and harmony, interacting and overlapping with different rhythmic schemes and melodies. The effect is shimmering, kaleidoscopic and seductive, a sonic trompe l'oeil that seem to have presaged images of fractal mathematics, centuries before they existed."

Opening bars of Les Barricades Mystérieuses

== Title ==
Les Barricades Mystérieuses was originally published with the spelling 'Les Baricades Mistérieuses' ["single r" in the first word, and "i" rather than "y" in the second word]. All four possible spelling combinations have since been used with "double r" and a "y" being the most common. The intended meaning of the phrase has remained an enigma (an example of how musical allusions can remain hidden over time).

There has been much speculation on the meaning of the phrase "mysterious barricades", but no direct evidence appears to be available. The harpsichordist Pascal Tufféry has suggested that, in keeping with the bucolic character of other pieces in Couperin's Ordre 6ème de clavecin, the pounding rhythm may represent the stamping of grapes in winemaking (given that the French word barrique means 'barrel', and barriquade was a designation adopted by viticulturalists of the day in France). In this view, the "mysterious" epithet could allude to the significance of wine in the Mysteries of Bacchus (as well as in the Eucharist sacrament). Some of the less likely interpretations of the "mysterious barricades" proposed over the years – sometimes in relation to the salonnières of the 17th century - include women’s eyelashes, underwear and even chastity belts.

A plausible attempt to link the title to features of the music itself has been provided by the harpsichordist Luke Arnason:

"The title Les Barricades Mystérieuses is probably meant to be evocative rather than a reference to a specific object, musical or otherwise. Scott Ross, in a master class filmed and distributed by Harmonia Mundi, likens the piece to a train. This clearly cannot have been the precise image Couperin was trying to convey, but it is easy to hear in Les Barricades the image of a heavy but fast-moving object that picks up momentum. In that sense, the mysterious barricades are perhaps those which cause the "train" to slow down and sometimes stop... This hypothesis seems to fit in with the pedagogical aims of Couperin's music, since the composer presents himself as something of a specialist in building sound through legato, style luthé playing... Moreover, it seems to form a set with the following piece, Les Bergeries. This latter piece, though more melodic than Les Barricades, set in a higher register and more bucolic in feeling, is also an exercise in using a repetitive motif (in this case a left hand ostinato evocative of the musette) to build sound without seeming mechanical or repetitive. Both Les Barricades Mystérieuses and Les Bergeries, then, are exercises in building (and relaxing) sound and momentum elegantly."

While the title reflects the musical structure, there may be more at play. The suggestion of barricades is "a double entendre referring simultaneously to feminine virginity and the suspensions [of] harmonic [progressions] of the music, [whose] lute figurations [from the style brisé] are imitated to produce an enigmatic stalemate", as Judith Robison Kipnis explained the work's title and its interpretation by her husband Igor Kipnis.

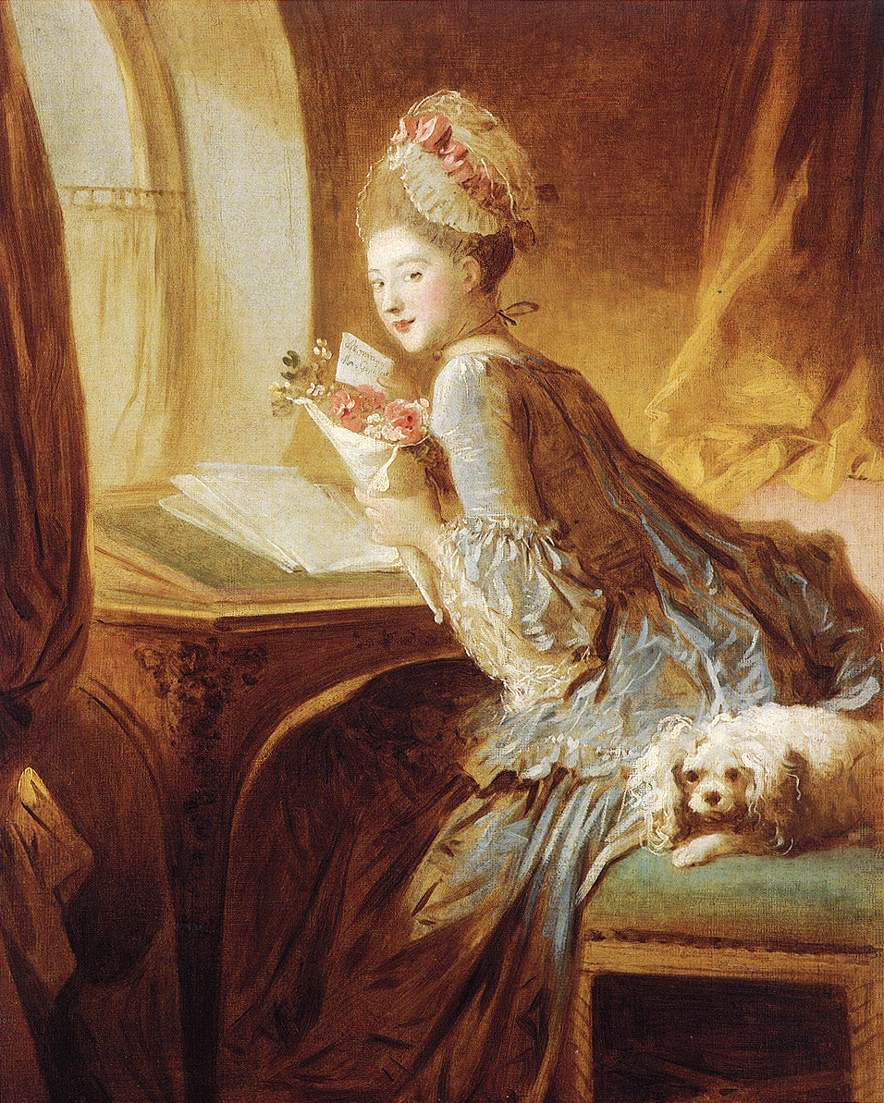
Jean-Honoré Fragonard The Love Letter (1770)

Other suggested intended meanings for the title include:

- impeding communication between people
- between past and present or present and future
- between life and death
- masks worn by performers of Le Mystère ou les Fêtes de l'Inconnu (The Mystery or the Celebrations of the Unknown) staged by one of Couperin's patrons, the Duchesse du Maine in 1714
- a "technical joke...the continuous suspensions in the lute style being a barricade to the basic harmony".

== Legacy ==
Claude Debussy, who considered François Couperin to be the "most poetic of our [French] harpsichordists" and an influence on his own piano études, expressed particular admiration for Les Barricades Mystérieuses. In 1903, Debussy wrote:

"We should think about the example Couperin's harpsichord works set us: they are marvelous models of grace and innocence long past. Nothing could ever make us forget the subtly voluptuous perfume, so delicately perverse, that so innocently hovers over the Barricades Mystérieuses."

=== Homages and references in other works ===
The piece has been used as a source of inspiration across different artistic fields including music, visual arts and literature.

==== Music ====
- 1971 Moog synthesizer rendition titled "Variations on Couperin's Rondeau ("Les Barricades mystérieuses")" on the album Short Circuits by Ruth White.
- 1973 harpsichord piece titled "Barricades (Rock piece after Couperin)" on the album Bhajebochstiannanas [an anagram of Johann Sebastian Bach] by Anthony Newman.
- 1982 piece for Synclavier, "Las Barricadas Misteriosas" composed by Sergio Barroso.
- 1984 written for and incorporating texts by Christopher Hewitt, a piece for women's chorus, piccolo, bassoon, harpsichord and clapping titled "Les Barricades Mysteriéuses" by Juilliard composer Andrew Thomas.
- 1986 album titled Heavenly Bodies including the Appia Suite, one movement of which is titled "Les Barricades mystérieuses", by British jazz composer Barbara Thompson. Re-recorded in the same year to be the title track of the German film Zischke.
- 1987 piece for solo guitar by John Williams on his album The Baroque Album.
- 1988 rock piece titled "Mysterious Barricades" on the album of the same name by former Police guitarist Andy Summers.
- 1989 work for flute and orchestra called "Les Barricades Mystérieuses" by Luca Francesconi.
- 1989 piece for three recorders called "Les Barricades" by Matthias Maute.
- 1990 a harpsichord concerto titled "Mysterious Barricades" commissioned by the Cleveland Chamber Symphony, composed by Tyler White.
- 1994 quintet arrangement for clarinet, bass clarinet, viola, cello and double bass in the album America: A prophecy by Thomas Adès.
- 1994 piece for solo guitar titled "Mysterious Habitats" by Serbian guitarist Dusan Bogdanovic.
- 1995 sextet arrangement for flute, oboe, clarinet, violin, viola, and cello titled "Les Barricades mystérieuses", the fourth of nine movements that make up the composition Récréations françaises by French composer Gérard Pesson.
- 1995 Le Barricate Misteriose (Hommage à Couperin) for 12 cellos, composed by Italian composer Gabriella Zen (commissioned by the Orquestra Villa Lobos).
- Mid-1990s solo percussion and electronic piece titled "Mysterious Barricades" on the album of the same name by Scott Smallwood.
- 1997 commissioned by the San Antonio Symphony Orchestra, "Las Barricadas Misteriosas" is the third movement of Sinfonía à la Mariachi by Robert Xavier Rodriguez.
- 1999 "Les Baricades Fantasques" is the second movement of a suite of three harpsichord pieces paying homage to Scarlatti, Couperin, and Bach, by American composer Robert T. Kelley.
- 2001 "Girándula" for 4 corni di bassetto or 4 bass clarinets, based on "Les Barricades mystérieuses", by Jacobo Durán-Loriga.
- 2002 folk song "Mysterious Barricades" on the album Letter to the Editor by Max Ochs.
- 2003 piece for drums, voice and instruments titled "Through the Mysterious Barricade" by Philip Corner. This was revisited in 2011 with a new work titled "Petite fantasie sur Les Barricades Mystérieuses (déjà une révélation) d'après François Couperin".
- 2007 "decomposition and performance" for piano titled "Les Barricades" Canadian performance artist Yawen Wang.
- 2009 electronic piece titled "Les Barricades Mystérieuses" by Portuguese composer António Ferreira.
- 2009 music video "Les Barricades Mystérieuses" by French electro-acoustic artist Mulinex.
- 2010 piece for oboe, horn, violin, viola, cello and harpsichord titled "The Mysterious Barricades" by Korean composer Jung Sun Kang.
- 2019 song "Bambina" from the album Father of the Bride by Vampire Weekend, bearing resemblance to the piece.
- 2021 The composer Alma Deutscher suggested that her vocal and visual arrangement of the piece, where the notes in the different voices rest on one another like barrels, may explain the imagery of barricades.

=== Film ===
- 2006: featured in Sofia Coppola's film Marie Antoinette.
- 2011: featured prominently in Terrence Malick's film Tree of Life.
- 2015: featured in the French movie Nous trois ou rien.
- 2023: featured prominently in Timm Kroger's film "[The Universal Theory (film)|German: Die Theorie von Allem, lit. 'The Theory of Everything']"

=== Literature ===
- 1922: The Worm Ourobouros by E. R. Eddison. Early in this fantasy novel the protagonist and his wife, hearing their daughter play this piece, comment to each other that only they know the true meaning of the title.
- 1955: the short story "The Mysterious Barricades" by Joan Aiken in her collection More than You Bargained For.
- 1990: mentioned in Paul Auster's The Music of Chance. The protagonist Jim Nashe feels compelled to play this work because it reminds him of the wall he is building. Wondering about the meaning of the tile, Nashe states that "[a]s far as he was concerned, the barricades stood for the wall he was building in the meadow, but that was quite another thing from knowing what they meant." (chapter 8)
- 2002: featured in the thriller novel Imprimatur by Rita Monaldi and Francesco Sorti, as the cure for an artificial pestilence.
