= Filippo Acciaiuoli =

Italian composer

Filippo Acciaiuoli (1637 – 8 February 1700) was an Italian composer, librettist, theater manager, machine designer, and poet. Acciaiuoli spent much of his youth and early adulthood traveling throughout Europe, the Middle East and Northern Africa. After returning to Rome in his early twenties, he initially studied mathematics at a seminary in Rome but ultimately became interested in theater. He is best known for his work as a librettist for operas such as Jacopo Melani's Girello, which premiered in Rome in 1668, and as the inventor of numerous sophisticated machines that were used in theatrical productions of the day. He also composed one opera, Chi è cagion del suo mal pianga se stesso, which premiered in Rome in 1682.

Acciaiuoli was the first business manager of the Teatro Tordinona in Rome and later the manager of the Teatro Capranica. He was also a member of l'Academia degli Immobili when Ferdinando Tacca developed its Teatro della Pergola. He had a close association with the court of Médicis. In 1689, Ferdinando II hired him to create theatrical machinery for the opera Greco in Troia. Contracts for other theatrical productions followed.

Acciaiuoli would also occasionally perform in operas as a dancer. He was a dancer in the interludes of the original 1658 production of Francesco Cavalli's Hipermestra, among other productions. He also exerted his talents within puppet theatres, designing machinery and occasionally working as a manipulator of marionettes. It is speculated that he coordinated the various aspects of the production of L'Empio Punito.

== Opera librettos ==
- Il Girello a burlesque opera by composer Jacopo Melani (Rome 1668)
- L'empio punito, drama per musica by Alessandro Melani (Rome, Carnival 1669) The libretto is based on the well known persona of Giovanni Tenorio who was also the basis for Mozart's Don Giovanni.
- Damira placata, opera, libretto written with Aurelio Aureli and composer Marc'Antonio Ziani (Venice, 1680)

== Sources ==
- The New Grove Dictionary of Opera, edited by Stanley Sadie (1992), 5,448 pages, ISBN 0-333-73432-7 and ISBN 1-56159-228-5
- The Oxford Dictionary of Opera, by John Warrack and Ewan West (1992), 782 pages, ISBN 0-19-869164-5
