= Secretum (novel) =

Book by Rita Monaldi and Francesco Sorti

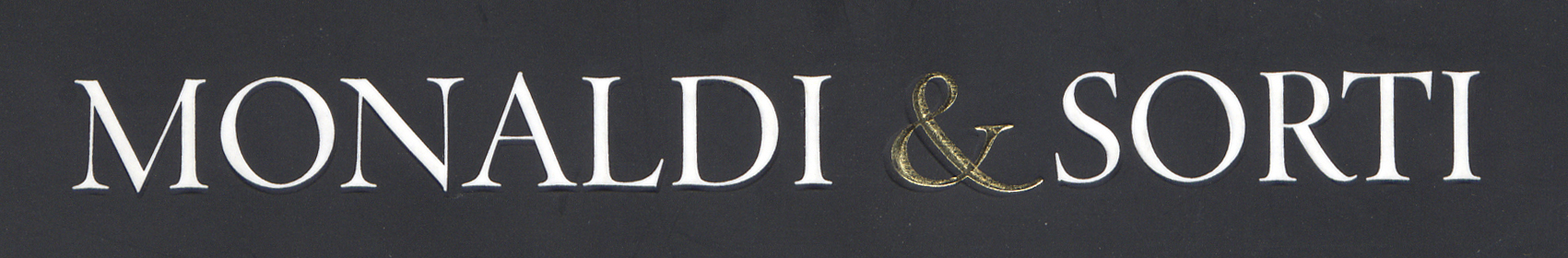
- Writing of the hardback version of the book Secretum by Monaldi & Sorti
- Author: Rita Monaldi and Francesco Sorti
- Original title: Secretum
- Language: Italian
- Genre: Historical novel, Mystery
- Publisher: Mondadori (Italy)
- Publication date: 2006
- Publication place: Italy
- Media type: Print (Paperback)
- Preceded by: Imprimatur

Secretum a historical novel by Monaldi and Sorti featuring the character Atto Melani, published in 2006. It is the sequel to Imprimatur.

== Plot summary ==
Secretum is the second historical thriller by Monaldi and Sorti featuring the adventures of the French spy and diplomat, Abbot Atto Melani. It follows their earlier novel, Imprimatur. The story is set in Rome in 1700, where Melani attends the marriage of Clemente, nephew of Cardinal Fabrizio Spada, to Maria Pulcheria Rocci, the niece of another highly influential cardinal. Given the prominence of both families, the wedding draws a remarkable gathering of senior church figures from across Europe.

At the time, Pope Innocent XII is gravely ill, and many of the assembled cardinals anticipate remaining in Rome for the conclave that will convene after his death to elect a new pope. Consequently, the wedding festivities serve purposes beyond celebration. They become a venue for political negotiation, alliance-building, and strategic maneuvering as various factions work to advance their preferred candidates—or themselves—in the forthcoming election.

Complicating matters further is the looming death of King Charles II of Spain. As he has no clear successor, uncertainty surrounds the future of the vast Spanish Empire. This issue has become one of the defining geopolitical concerns of the era. Louis XIV of France, the famed Sun King, has already negotiated an agreement with England and the Dutch Republic to divide Spanish territories once Charles dies. Meanwhile, the Habsburg rulers of Austria are determined to prevent France from expanding its influence and hope that a member of their dynasty will inherit the Spanish crown. Adding further significance, Charles II has sought guidance from the ailing Pope on the matter of succession.

These interconnected political crises dominate conversations among the cardinals gathered at Villa Spada. Importantly, the historical events that underpin the novel are genuine. Europe at the turn of the eighteenth century was a landscape of intense diplomatic rivalry, and the College of Cardinals itself was divided by national interests and competing loyalties.

The authors further include approximately thirty pages of supporting material. These appendices contain references to historical sources, documentary evidence, and arguments defending the authenticity of the events and details presented in the novel. Readers are provided with enough information to verify many of the factual claims themselves, and directions are even given to key historical documents for those wishing to investigate further.

== Reception ==
In English-language publications, Secretum was reviewed in the Historical Novels Review, The Canberra Times, the Sunday Mercury, The Statesman, and the Philippine Daily Inquirer. The Italian newspapers Blitz Quotidiano and Corriere della Sera also covered the novel. The latter called the premise a "genuine scoop".
