= Jacopo Melani =

Italian composer and violinist

Jacopo Melani (6 July 1623 – 18 August 1676) was an Italian composer and violinist of the Baroque era. He was born and died in Pistoia, and was the brother of composer Alessandro Melani and singer Atto Melani.

== Works ==
- 1655-6: Intermedi (with La donna più costante), Florence, Cocomero
- 1657: Il potestà di Colognole (La Tancia) (libretto G. A. Moniglia), dramma civile rusticale, Florence, Teatro della Pergola
- 1657: Scipione in Cartagine (libretto Moniglia?), dramma musicale, Florence, Cocomero
- 1658: Il pazzo per forza (libretto G. A. Moniglia), dramma civile rusticale, Florence, Teatro della Pergola
- 1659: Il vecchio balordo (Il vecchio burlato) (libretto Moniglia), dramma civile, Florence, Teatro della Pergola
- 1661: Ercole in Tebe (libretto G. A. Moniglia), festa teatrale, Florence, Teatro della Pergola; starred Antonio Cottini
- 1663: Amor vuol inganno (La vedova, ovvero Amor vuol inganno) (libretto G. A. Moniglia), dramma civile, Florence
- 1668: Girello (libretto Filippo Acciaiuoli), dramma musicale burlesco with a prologue by Alessandro Stradella, Rome, Palazzo Colonna
- 1669: Il ritorno d'Ulisse (libretto Moniglia), dramma musicale, Pisa, Palazzo dei Medici
- 1670: Enea in Italia (libretto Moniglia), dramma musicale, Pisa, Palazzo dei Medici
- 1674: Tacere et amare (libretto Moniglia), dramma civile musicale, Florence, Cocomero
