= Enrico Serra =

Italian historian

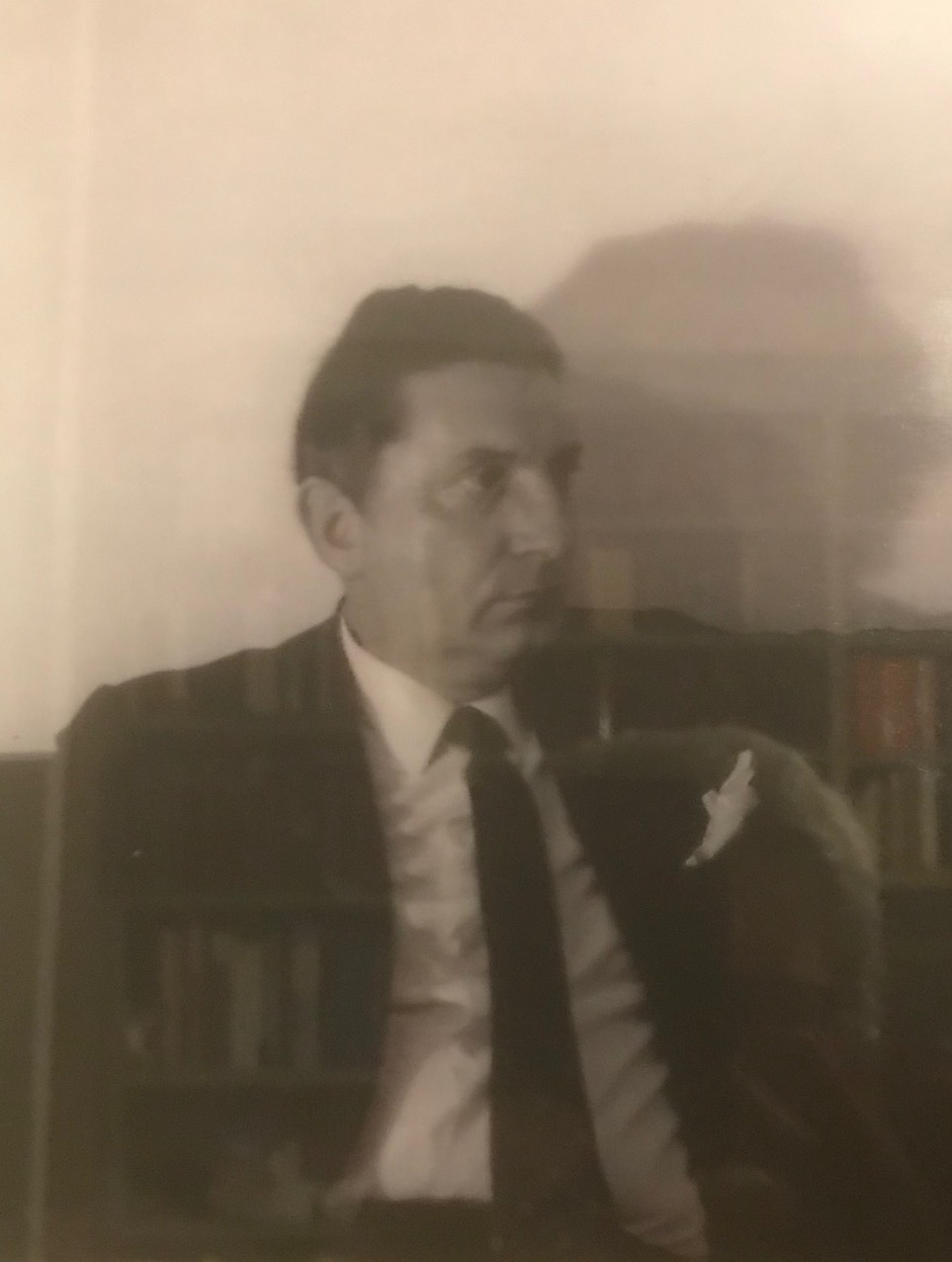
- Enrico Serra (1968)
- Born: September 26, 1914; Modena, Italy
- Died: October 4, 2007 (aged 93); Rome, Italy
- Occupation: Historian

Enrico Serra (September 26, 1914 - October 4, 2007) was an Italian historian.

== Early life ==
Born in Modena into a family of landowners, Serra graduated with honors from the University of Modena in 1937 with a thesis in international law.

In 1935, while still a student, he attended a summer course that enabled him to obtain the rank of officer. In Modena in 1937 he began working at La Gazzetta dell'Emilia with Cesare Viaggi.

== Career ==
In 1938 he was called by Giorgio Balladore Pallieri to collaborate with the Institute for International Political Studies (ISPI) on the production of the Yearbook of International Law and later joined the institute's Bureau of Studies. During these years he also came into contact with established historians such as Federico Chabod and Luigi Salvatorelli. During the World War II, he served as a tank officer in the Libyan front (1941–1942), where he was seriously wounded and earned two silver medals for military valor. He was then involved in the Resistance (1943–1945) in the Giustizia e Libertà formations. In 1968 he became full professor of history of treaties and international relations at the University of Bologna, where he remained as professor emeritus.

Serra played a very important role at the Italian Ministry of Foreign Affairs and International Cooperation where he was head of the history and documentation service for 20 years (1972–1992). During this period he created the series Testi Diplomatici consisting of fifteen monographic volumes dedicated to some of the most important figures in Italian diplomacy. Within the Commission for the Publication of Italian Diplomatic Documents he was one of the most active scholars and edited several volumes of the series. His role and commitment at ISPI and the Ministry of Foreign Affairs allowed for the establishment of a fruitful relationship between academia and diplomacy that has been consolidated over time. In 1972, Serra established together with the French historian Jean-Baptiste Duroselle an Italian–French committee of historical studies that organized several important conferences and published several books.

He collaborated with the journal Nuova Antologia for over fifty years, regularly publishing articles and essays. His first contribution to the magazine was in 1949 and his last in 2004. His historical and literary portraits were collected in a volume published shortly before his death. In his memory, the Spadolini Nuova Antologia Foundation, in agreement with the General Secretariat of the Ministry of Foreign Affairs and the Serra family, established an annual prize named after him for a young graduate in the History of International Relations. Together with other leading figures, including Giuseppe Medici, Pietro Quaroni, Michele Cifarelli, Aldo Garosci and Giovanni Spadolini he founded the Italian Association for Foreign Policy Studies and the journal Affari esteri in 1969.

His son Maurizio Enrico Serra is an Italian diplomat and writer and a member of the Académie française.

== Works ==
- Enrico Serra (1946). L'aggressione internazionale. Milano: U. Hoepli.
- Enrico Serra (1950). Camille Barrère e l'intesa italo-francese. Milano: Giuffrè.
- Enrico Serra (1957). L'intesa mediterranea del 1902: una fase risolutiva nei rapporti italo-inglesi. Milano: Giuffrè.
- Enrico Serra (1967). La questione tunisina da Crispi a Rudinì ed il Colpo di timone alla politica estera dell'Italia. Milano: Giuffrè.
- Enrico Serra (1970). Istituzioni di storia dei trattati e politica internazionale. Bologna: Calderini.
- Enrico Serra (1975). Nitti e la Russia. Bari: Dedalo libri.
- Enrico Serra (1975). Introduzione alla storia dei trattati e alla diplomazia. Milano: ISPI.
- Enrico Serra (1975). Manuale di storia dei trattati e di diplomazia. Milano: ISPI.
- Enrico Serra; Jean-Baptiste Duroselle, eds. (1978). L'emigrazione italiana in Francia prima del 1914. Milano: Franco Angeli publisher.
- Enrico Serra; Jean-Baptiste Duroselle, eds. (1981). Italia e Francia dal 1919 al 1939. Milano: Istituto per gli studi di politica internazionale.
- Enrico Serra; Jean-Baptiste Duroselle, eds. (1984). Italia e Francia, 1939–1945 (2 Vol.). Milano: Franco Angeli publisher.
- Enrico Serra; Jean-Baptiste Duroselle, eds. (1986). Il vincolo culturale fra Italia e Francia negli anni Trenta e Quaranta. Milano: Franco Angeli publisher.
- Enrico Serra (1987). Alberto Pisani diplomatico. Milano: Franco Angeli publisher. ISBN 88-204-2252-2.
- Enrico Serra, ed. (1988). L'accordo Degasperi-Gruber nei documenti diplomatici italiani e austriaci. Trento: Regione autonoma Trentino Alto Adige.
- Enrico Serra (1987). L'emigrazione italiana in Francia prima del 1914. Milano: Franco Angeli publisher. ISBN 88-204-1498-8.
- Enrico Serra (1988). La diplomazia in Italia. Milano: Franco Angeli publisher. ISBN 88-204-2357-X.
- Enrico Serra; Jean-Baptiste Duroselle, eds. (1990). Italia e Francia: 1946–1954. Milano: Franco Angeli publisher. ISBN 88-204-2941-1.
- Enrico Serra, ed. (1988). L'accordo Degasperi-Gruber nei documenti diplomatici italiani e austriaci. Trento: Regione autonoma Trentino Alto Adige.
- Enrico Serra, ed. (1989). Il bilancio dell'Europa e i Trattati di Roma : actes du colloque de Rome 25–28 mars 1987. Milano: Giuffre.
- Enrico Serra (1990). L'Italia e le grandi alleanze nel tempo dell'imperialismo: saggi di tecnica diplomatica 1870–1915. Milano: Franco Angeli publisher. ISBN 88-204-6463-2.
- Enrico Serra (1990). Professione: diplomatico, volume secondo. Milano: Franco Angeli publisher. ISBN 88-204-6598-1.
- Enrico Serra; C. Seton-Watson, eds. (1990). Italia e Inghilterra nell'età dell'imperialismo. Milano: Franco Angeli publisher. ISBN 88-204-3773-2.
- Enrico Serra (1996). Tempi duri: guerra e Resistenza. Bologna: Il mulino. ISBN 88-15-05512-6.
- Enrico Serra (1999). Professione: ambasciatore d'Italia. Milano: Franco Angeli publisher. ISBN 88-464-1152-8.
- Enrico Serra (1999). Sul filo della memoria. Antologia di scritti su «Nuova antologia» 1949–2005. Firenze: Polistampa. ISBN 88-8304-898-9.
- Enrico Serra (2007). Winston Churchill. Luci e ombre. Milano: Le Lettere.
- Enrico Serra (2009). La diplomazia: strumenti e metodi. Milano: Le Lettere.
- Enrico Serra (2020). L'occupazione bellica germanica negli anni 1939-1940. lavis: La finestra. ISBN 978-88-322-3610-1.
- Enrico Serra (2023). De la discorde à l'entente. Camille Barrère et l'Italie (1897–1924). Paris: Comité des travaux historiques et scientifiques (CTHS). ISBN 978-2-7355-0960-7.

== Honours ==
Order of Merit of the Italian Republic 1st Class / Knight Grand Cross – 18 June 1985
