= L'empio punito =

1669 opera by Alessandro Melani

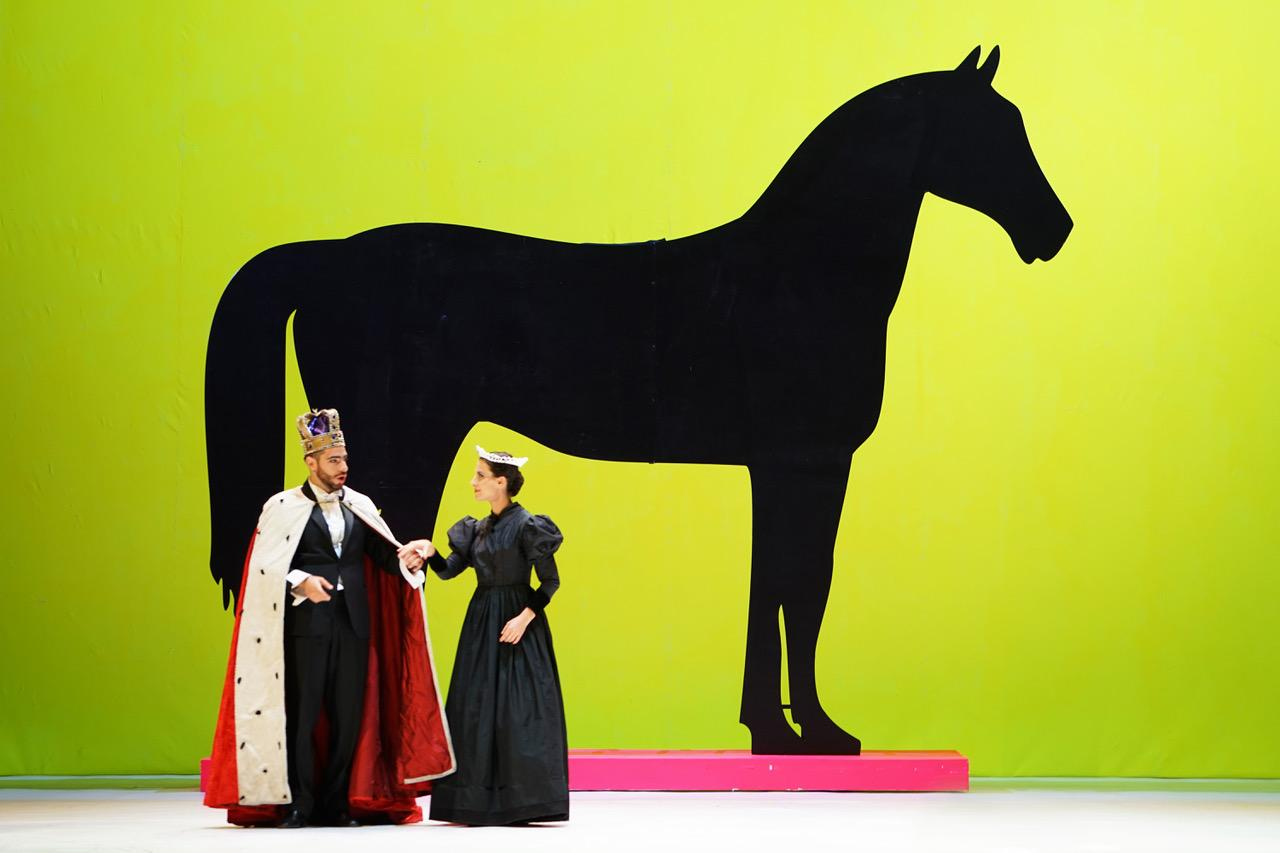
A production of L'empio Punito in Pisa in 2019

L'empio punito is an opera by composer Alessandro Melani. Notably the first opera written on the subject of Don Juan, the work uses an Italian language libretto by Giovanni Filippo Apolloni and Filippo Acciaiuoli. The opera was commissioned by Marie Mancini for performance during Carnival of 1669. The work premiered at the Teatro di Palazzo Colonna in the historic Borgo district of Rome on 17 February 1669.

== Roles ==
- Atamira
- Ipomene
- Delfa
- Niceste
- Proserpina
- Bibi
- Atrace
- Cloridoro
- Tidemo
- Acrimante
- Corimbo
- Telefo
- Demonio
- Caronte

== Recordings ==
- DVD L'Empio Punito - Alessandro Ravasio, Michela Guarrera, Carlotta Colombo, Sabrina Cortese, Mauro Borgioni, Reate Festival Baroque Ensemble, Alessandro Quarta
- CD L'Empio Punito - Roberta Invernizzi, Raffaele Pe, Raffaella Milanesi, Giorgio Celenza, Alberto Allegrezza, Auser Musici, Carlo Ipata Glossa
