= Maurizio Serra =

Italian writer and diplomat

- Born: 3 June 1955 (age 71); London, United Kingdom
- Occupations: Writer diplomat
- Known for: Member of the Académie française

Maurizio Serra (born 3 June 1955 in London) is a contemporary Italian writer and diplomat. Maurizio Serra was Italian Ambassador to the Unesco. He writes in Italian and French. He received the Prix Goncourt de la Biographie in 2011 for his book Malaparte, vies et légendes, a biography on Curzio Malaparte. Serra was elected to the Académie Française on 9 January 2020.

His father was Enrico Serra, Italian historian.

== Works ==
- 1999: Le Passager du siècle. Guerres, révolutions, Europes, with Ferenc Fejtő, Paris, Éditions Hachette, 373 p. ISBN 2-01-235383-5
- 2008: Les Frères séparés. Drieu La Rochelle, Aragon, Malraux face à l'histoire, ["Fratelli separati : Drieu-Aragon-Malraux : il fascista, il comunista, l'avventuriero"], trans. Carole Cavallera, Paris, La Table Ronde, 319 p. ISBN 978-2-7103-2979-4

2008: – prix du Rayonnement de la langue et de la littérature françaises (Académie française)

- 2008: Marinetti et la révolution futuriste, trad. de Carole Cavallera, Paris, Éditions de L’Herne, series "Carnets de l'Herne", 115 p. ISBN 978-2-85197-881-3
- 2011: Malaparte, vies et légendes, Paris, Éditions Grasset et Fasquelle, 634 p. ISBN 978-2-246-75281-3. Revised and expanded ed. published in 2012, Paris, Éditions Perrin, series "Tempus", 797 p. ISBN 978-2-262-03753-6. English translation (forthcoming): Malaparte: A Biography, trans. Stephen Twilley, New York Review Books, 2026, 716 p. ISBN 978-2-2467-5281-3

2011: – Prix Goncourt de la Biographie.
2011: – prix Casanova

- 2013: Italo Svevo ou l’antivie, Paris, Éditions Grasset et Fasquelle, 400 p. ISBN 978-2-246-78736-5
- 2015: Une génération perdue. Les Poètes-guerriers dans l'Europe des années 1930, Paris, Éditions du Seuil, 360 p. ISBN 978-2-02-117011-5
- 2015: L'esteta armato. Il Poeta-Condottiero nell’Europa degli anni Trenta, Lavis, La Finestra Editrice, 404 p. ISBN 978-8895925-54-7
- 2017: Antivita di Italo Svevo, Collana Biblioteca, Torino, Nino Aragno Editore, ISBN 978-88-841-9928-7
- 2019: L'Imaginifico. Vita di Gabriele D'Annunzio, Collana I narratori delle tavole, Neri Pozza, ISBN 978-88-545-1794-3
- 2020: Amours diplomatqiues, Paris, Grasset, 318p. ISBN 978-2-246-81801-4. Italian translation: Amori diplomatici. Un romanzo in tre movimenti, Venezia, Marsilio, 2021, ISBN 978-88-297-0794-2.
- 2021: Il caso Mussolini, Collana I colibrì, Vicenza, Neri Pozza, ISBN 978-88-545-2312-8
- 2023: Visiteur, Grasset, Paris, ISBN 978-2246832621
