= Alessandro Melani =

Italian composer

- Born: Alessandro Melani; 4 February 1639; Pistoia
- Died: 3 October 1703 (aged 64); Rome
- Occupation: Composer
- Known for: Operas
- Style: Baroque

Alessandro Melani (4 February 1639 – 3 October 1703) was an Italian composer and the brother of composer Jacopo Melani, and castrato singer Atto Melani. Along with Bernardo Pasquini and Alessandro Scarlatti, he was one of the leading composers active in Rome during the 17th century. He is also ranked among the second school of Roman opera composers which began with his brother's 1668 opera Il Girello. He is chiefly remembered today for his large output of liturgical music that he wrote while serving in various musical posts in Rome. Of particular interest is the large number of polychoral motets that he produced and his eight ascribed oratorios. Three published collections of his liturgical music survive today along with numerous solitary motets from other published volumes. A number of original manuscripts also survive.

== Biography ==
Born in Pistoia, Melani began singing at the Pistoia Cathedral at the age of 11, remaining there for ten years until he became maestro di cappella in Orvieto in 1663 and Ferrara in 1665. He returned to Pistoia in December 1666 to replace his brother as maestro di cappella of the cathedral in June 1667. The following October, he was appointed maestro di cappella of the Basilica di Santa Maria Maggiore in Rome. He remained there until July 1672, when he became the maestro at San Luigi dei Francesi, remaining in that role until his death 31 years later.

Melani was a favorite composer of Cardinal Giulio Rospigliosi (later Pope Clement IX). The Papal conclave of 1667 commissioned him to write an opera (title now unknown) for Carnival of 1668. His next opera, L'empio punito (commissioned by Marie Mancini), premiered at Carnival a year later and was notably the first opera on the subject of Don Juan (although it only uses selected elements of the tale and is set in ancient Greece with character names completely different from the traditional Spanish names). In 1686, he collaborated with Scarlatti and Pasquini on the opera Santa Dimna. In 1685, he composed an oratorio, Golia abbattuto, for King John III of Poland. The work was written to celebrate the Holy League's victory against the Turks; he gained the commission through the efforts of Pope Innocent XI. This coupled with the fact that Alessandro’s nephews were made a part of the minor nobility in Tuscany around this time has caused some scholars to speculate that politics played a role in the events surrounding the 1685 commission.

Melani wrote another notable oratorio in 1690, Lo scisma nel sacerdozio (now lost), for Francesco II d'Este. Of all the oratorios attributed to him, the most frequently performed was Il fratricidio di Caino. He also enjoyed the patronage of Ferdinando II de' Medici, Grand Duke of Tuscany, and he was listed among the "celebrated professors of music protected by the Prince of Tuscany" in 1695. He died in Rome at the age of 64.

== Works ==
Operas

- L'Ergenia (Rome, 1668)
- L'empio punito (Filippo Acciaiuoli and Giovanni Filippo Apolloni; Rome, 1669)
- Le reciproche gelosie (Bartolomeo Nencini; Siena, 1677)
- Il carceriere di sé medesimo (Lodovico Adimari; Florence, 1681)
- Ama chi t’ama (Bartolomeo Nencini; Siena 1682)
- L’Idaspe
- Il conte d’Altamura ovvero Il vecchio geloso
- La santa Dimna figlia del re d'Irlanda (Benedetto Pamphili; Rome, 1686, only act 1; act 2 Bernardo Pasquini, act 3 Alessandro Scarlatti)
- L’innocenza vendicata overo La santa Eugenia (Giulio Bussi; Viterbo, 1686)

Oratorios

- La destruttione di Jerico (Rome, 1675)
- La morte di Oloferne (libretto Bartolomeo Nencini; Rome, 1675)
- Il giudizio di Salomone (Ferrara, 1676)
- Il sacrificio d’Abel (Benedetto Pamphili; Rome, 1678)
- Santa Francesca Romana (libretto Giulio Bussi; Rome, 1679)
- Santa Rosa (libretto Giulio Bussi (?); Viterbo, 1686)
- Lo scisma del sacerdozio (libretto Giovan Battista Giardini; Modena, 1691)

== Sources ==
- Robert Lamar Weaver, "Alessandro Melani", The New Grove Dictionary of Music and Musicians, 2001.
- Arnaldo Morelli, "Melani, Alessandro", in Dizionario Biografico degli Italiani, vol. 58 (Rome, 2009)
