= Malaparte. Morte come me =

2016 novel by Monaldi & Sorti

- Author: Monaldi & Sorti
- Language: Italian
- Publisher: Baldini & Castoldi
- Publication date: 7 July 2016
- Publication place: Italy
- Pages: 496
- ISBN: 9788868529642

Malaparte. Morte come me (lit. 'Malaparte: Death Like Me') is a 2016 novel by the Italian writer duo Monaldi & Sorti. It is a murder mystery set on Capri in 1939 with the writer Curzio Malaparte as main character.

== Plot ==
The novel is set on the island of Capri in the summer of 1939 and is inspired by a real case, the death of Pamela Reynolds in May 1935. The writer Curzio Malaparte is building the Casa Malaparte on the island, where he lives after having fallen out with the National Fascist Party. When the OVRA accuses him of having killed a young, English poet four years earlier, he goes into hiding and works with a small group of friends to investigate the case and figure out who is trying to frame him.

== Reception ==
Roberta Scorranese of the Corriere della Sera wrote that the novel avoids being a banal conspiracy thriller by interweaving its plot with Capri's history and Malaparte's biography. Scorranese wrote that the book contributes to the understanding of Malaparte by emphasising his "modern" and "oscillating" approach to conflict.

The book was a semi-finalist for the Strega Prize.
