= Malaparte: A Biography =

2011 book by Maurizio Serra

- Author: Maurizio Serra
- Original title: Malaparte, vies et légendes
- Translator: Stephen Twilley
- Language: French
- Subject: Curzio Malaparte
- Genre: biography
- Publisher: Éditions Grasset
- Publication date: 16 February 2011
- Publication place: France
- English publication date: 25 February 2025
- Pages: 640
- ISBN: 9782246752813

Malaparte: A Biography (French: Malaparte, vies et légendes, lit. 'Malaparte, lives and legends') is a 2011 book by the Italian literary critic and historian Maurizio Serra. It is a biography of Curzio Malaparte and covers his various careers as soldier, writer, journalist, diplomat, trade unionist, politician and film director.

The book was awarded the Prix Goncourt de la Biographie. The English translation by Stephen Twilley is set to be published by New York Review Books on 25 February 2025.
