= Imprimatur (novel) =

Book by Rita Monaldi and Francesco Sorti

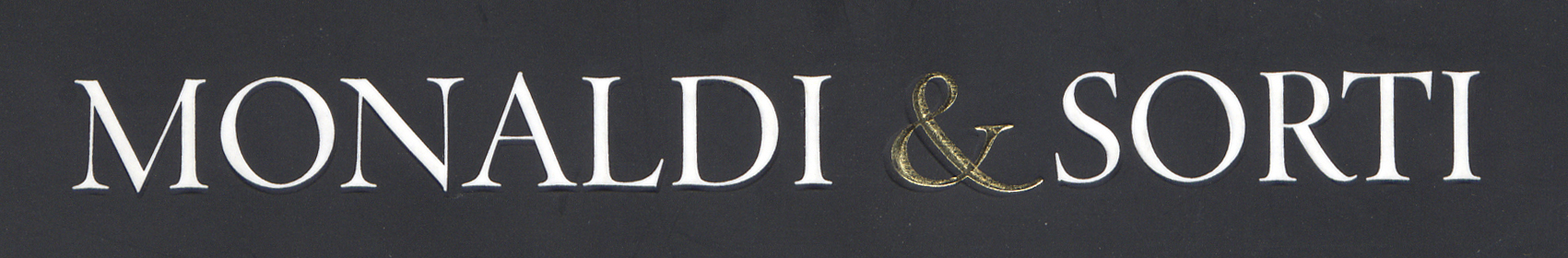
- Writing of the hardback version of the book Imprimatur by Monaldi & Sorti
- Author: Rita Monaldi and Francesco Sorti
- Original title: Imprimatur
- Language: Italian
- Genre: Historical novel, Mystery
- Publisher: Mondadori (Italy)
- Publication date: 2002
- Publication place: Italy
- English publication date: 2002
- Media type: Print (Paperback)
- Pages: 644
- ISBN: 2702874215 (IT, Mondadori, paperback edition)
- Followed by: Secretum

Imprimatur is the title of an Italian historical novel, written by Rita Monaldi and Francesco Sorti. It was originally published in Italy in 2002; since when it has been translated into twenty languages, and sold over a million copies worldwide. It is the first in a series of books based around the principal character of the 17th century diplomat and spy, Atto Melani: the remaining novels being Secretum (2006), Veritas (2007), Mysterium (2011), and Unicum. The book sparked controversy, especially from the Vatican.

== Plot summary ==
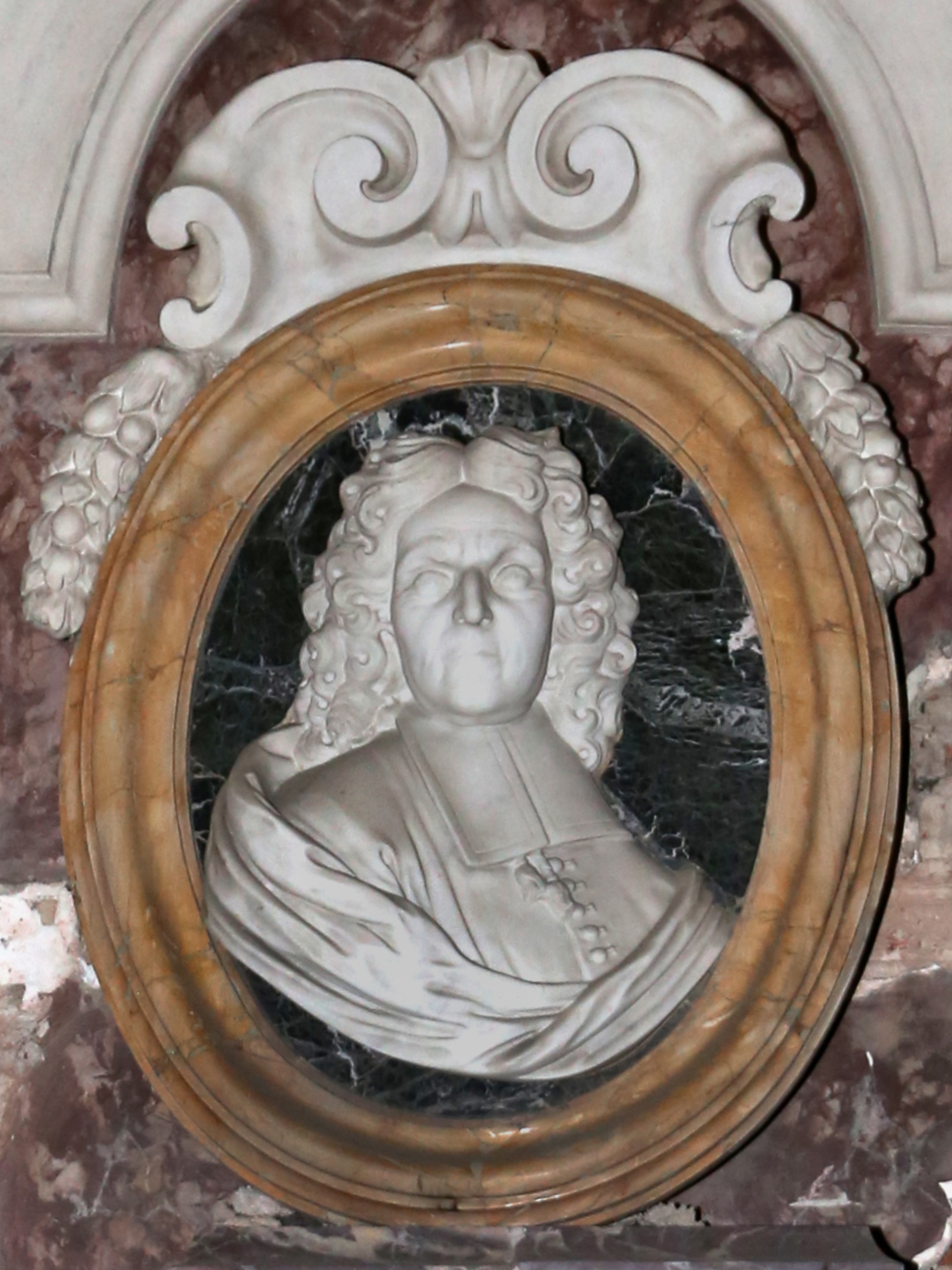
Atto Melani

The story takes place primarily within a hostelry in Rome in the year 1683. Ten guests of varying origin are resident - including a French guitar player, a Tuscan doctor, a Venetian glass artisan, an English refugee, a Neapolitan astrologer (posing as an artist), and a Jansenist. Everyone hides a secret. When the French nobleman, De Mourai, dies suddenly, the inn is placed under quarantine because the authorities believe plague has broken out. However, abbot Atto Melani, suspects instead that the Frenchman has been poisoned, and together with his young servant (the narrator but unnamed), starts to investigate.

Melani and the servant quickly discover a network of ancient tunnels, once used by early Christians to avoid persecution. They also find that the other guests of the inn have also been using the tunnels. Outside the inn, the wider world anxiously awaits the outcome of the Turkish siege at the Battle of Vienna, where the Christian military coalition has been assembled under the direction of Pope Innocent XI. If the Christian reinforcements arrive too late, then Vienna will fall and Europe will be at the mercy of the Ottomans.

== Critical reception ==
The novel was first published in Italian in March 2002 after the rights were bought by the publishing house, Mondadori (owned by Fininvest). It was reported as the fourth bestselling book at the time, and led to a second edition. The novel received a number of positive critical reviews in the international literary press. Solander, the American magazine of the Historical Novel Society, and El País of Spain compared it with classic 20th century historical novels like Umberto Eco´s The Name of the Rose and The Leopard by Giuseppe Tomasi di Lampedusa.

The Times Literary Supplement, a British literary magazine, said, "Imprimatur starts well and gets better." The Independent called it "an exuberant and discursive historical novel, crammed with fascinating detail." Scotland on Sunday said, "The authors inject every scene with life, colour, lies and wit." The Herald described it as "a literary page-turner which delivered what Eco could not: a genuinely new discovery which was guaranteed to set the cat among the Vatican pigeons."

A reviewer in The Australian wrote, "A massive, elegant, baroque edifice, superbly written and researched. Imprimatur is as genuine as The Da Vinci Code is phony. High-minded satire gives way to broad comedy and finally slapstick. Imprimatur is many things: anti-clerical tract, Chaucerian comedy, whodunit, history thesis and Dickensian dose of urban underbelly."

In France, Le Monde asked, "What should be more admired: the keenness, great narrative talent, and knowledge of philologist Rita Monaldi and musicologist Francesco Sorti, or the masterful style and superior quality of language of a captivating literary creation?" Meanwhile, Le Figaro praised the "breathless search for a truth that tears away all the veils of deception." L'Express called the authors "the successors to Umberto Eco."

=== Style and literary models ===
A number of literary critics have suggested that the book recalls elements of the traditional detective novel, such as those featuring Sherlock Holmes; or a murder-mystery set by Agatha Christie. Or perhaps set in the baroque age reminiscent of “The Three Musketeers” by Alexandre Dumas or Jules Verne.

Elsewhere, comparisons with the group of characters inhabiting the inn have been drawn with the model used successfully by authors such as Geoffrey Chaucer and Charles Dickens. The authors themselves have stressed the influence of the Italian philosophical novel of the 19th century, Alessandro Manzoni's The Betrothed. Noting that Boccaccio divides his narrative up into days in The Decameron, as well as in the Germanic Bildungsroman.

== Controversy sparked by the novel ==
The publication of the novel proved highly controversial in Italy - Monaldi and Sorti claim they found themselves subsequently blacklisted because of the claims made in the book around the role of the papacy in particular. Although the story itself is fiction, many of the persona and events are not. The authors claimed to have researched information from 17th-century manuscripts and published works concerning the siege of Vienna and provided an appendix of historical references to support the idea of a secret agreement between William III and Innocent XI.

=== Historical context ===
The reign of Pope Innocent XI was indeed marked by conflict between the papacy and the French monarchy, in the person of Louis XIV, over matters such as the French claim to what it called the Gallican Liberties. For fear of Louis XIV's dominance, not only Innocent but also Catholic leaders such as the king of Spain and the elector of Bavaria supported William of Orange. The conflict between the papacy and Louis XIV continued under Pope Innocent's immediate successors, Pope Alexander VIII, an ally of William, and Pope Innocent XII.

When news of William's decisive victory over James at the Battle of the Boyne reached Rome, the papal court, still allied with him against Louis XIV, but by then headed by Pope Alexander VIII, is reported to have ordered the singing of a Te Deum of thanksgiving, while similar celebrations were held in Catholic churches in Madrid, Brussels, and Vienna.

Lord Melfort, a strong supporter of King James, reported that the pope "seemed horribly scandalised" that any cathedral had sung a Te Deum for William's victory; but, as historians observed in 1841, "the plain truth is, that William all along had a strong party among the cardinals ... the great principle of the papal court was to check in Italy the progress of the French, who more than once flattered themselves with the hope of becoming masters of the entire Peninsula. There are reasons for believing that, when the Prince of Orange came over to expel his most Catholic father-in-law, he brought some of the pope's money with him to help him in that undertaking."

Professor Eamonn Duffy, a historian at the University of Cambridge has written, "It is widely accepted, because of James's indebtedness to France, that the Pope was actually relieved when James fell."

=== William III ===
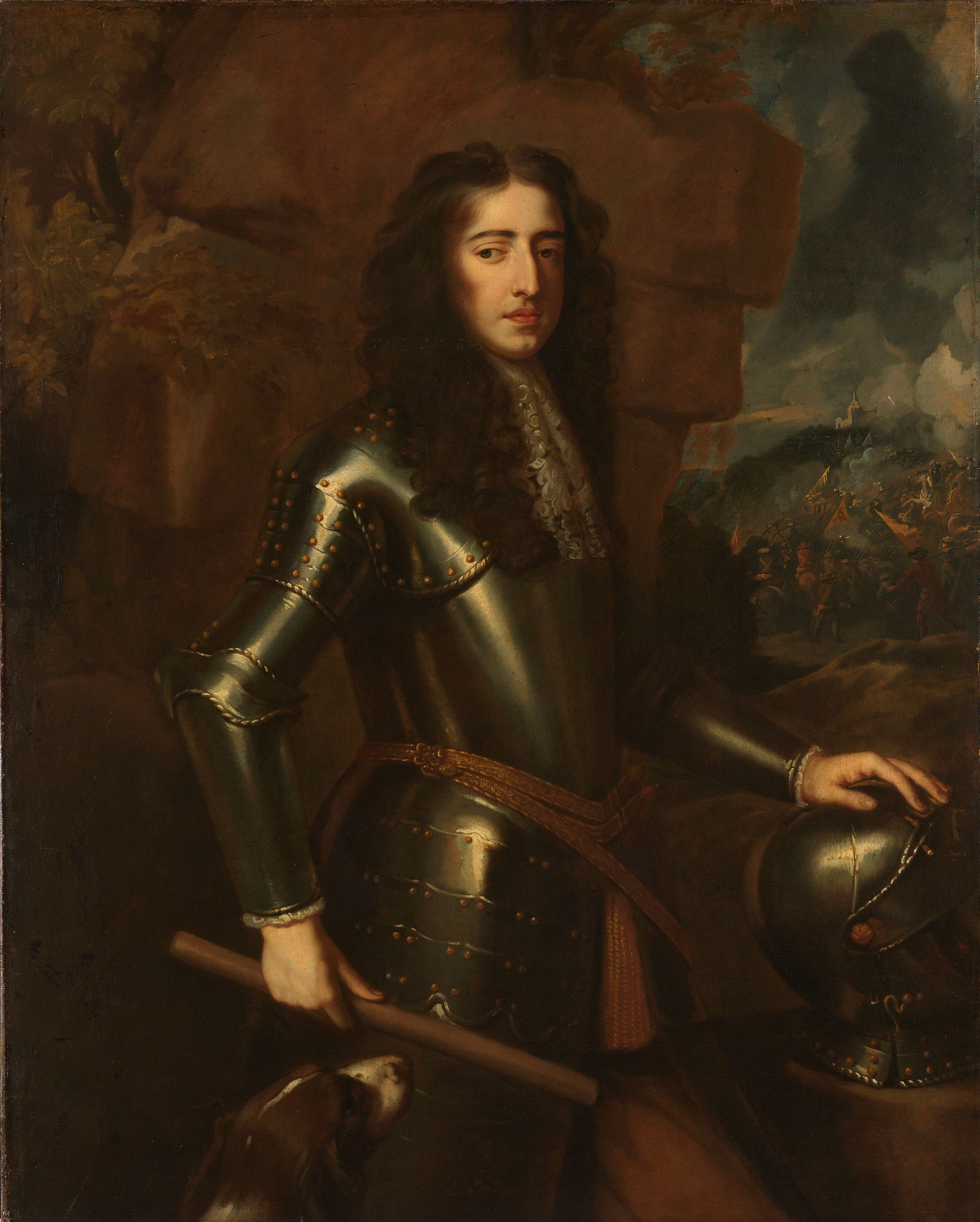
Portrait of William, aged 27, in the manner of Willem Wissing after a prototype by Sir Peter Lely

The central theme of the plot in particular has caused controversy. Monaldi and Sorti claimed they had found convincing documentary evidence that Pope Innocent XI had effectively financed the overthrow of the Catholic king James II by the Protestant claimant William III in the Glorious Revolution of 1688. This was because Innocent's family, the Odescalchi (based in Como), were an important banking dynasty that had lent money to William and sought a financial return. Furthermore, Innocent was keen politically to prevent Great Britain and France from establishing an alliance that could threaten the influence of the papacy in European affairs. William's accession to the throne entrenched Protestantism as the official religion of the English sovereign as part of the new constitutional settlement.

The two Italian authors argue that the Dutch entourage of William of Orange was secretly funded by the Odescalchi family, a dynasty of bankers, before William was old enough to conceive and undertake an autonomous political strategy. However, once they were there, the loans had to be paid back. This goal could be achieved only with William (who in his youth had never been financially secure) becoming king of England and thus achieving personal power and financial resources. This covert political game influenced surreptitiously the attitude of both the protagonists. In particular, the pope helped William indirectly by displaying strong opposition against the Catholic French King, Louis XIV, the principal enemy of William, and failed to meaningfully help English Catholics either before and during the events of the Glorious Revolution. Shortly after 1688, however, Pope Innocent, and the loan could be repaid by William only to the pontiff's nephew.

In the ledgers of Carlo Odescalchi, brother of the Pope and administrator of the family's vast patrimony till his death in 1673, the authors claim to have found the testimonies of relevant loans of the Odescalchi to the entourage of William of Orange: Dutch merchants, members of the Admiralty and William's counsellors. These kind of loans were not unusual for the Odescalchi, who were active in banking since the early 17th century. The loans were sent to Amsterdam through a company based in Venice and officially run by two merchants, Pietro Martire Cernezzi and Aurelio Rezzonico, but secretly belonging to the Odescalchi. The company Cernezzi & Rezzonico was already known to historians since the 19th century, but Monaldi & Sorti were the first ones to establish that the company was owned by the Odescalchi.

Carlo Odescalchi had shared with his brother a “proprietà commune et indivisa” (“a common and undivided patrimony”). This meant that all financial operations made by Carlo were automatically done in the name of, and in the interest of, Cardinal Benedetto Odescalchi (later Pope Innocent). Within the space of nine years, between 1660 and 1669, the Odescalchi sent at least 22,000 scudi to the financier Jan Deutz, founder and proprietor of one of the principal Dutch banks.

The loan, according to the authors, might have been paid back through a deal of art objects that took place in Rome in 1689, a few months after the death of Innocent. The significant art collection of Queen Christina of Sweden (who lived in Rome and in turn had died a few months before Innocent) was offered for sale by Christina's heir - the Roman aristocrat and cardinal, Decio Azzolino. The buyer of the expensive collection, whose price was unaffordable only for a very few individuals, was William of Orange. Nevertheless, Livio Odescalchi, nephew and heir of Pope Innocent XI, “snatched the lot from under William’s nose” and bought it for a sum (123,000 scudi) curiously close to the amount of William's debt to the Odescalchi”. Given the long series of anomalous circumstances (immediately after the dramatic events of 1688, with no financial security and sitting on a still shaky throne, William negotiated the purchase of an immensely expensive art collection in the remote and hostile capital of Catholicism), Monaldi & Sorti suspect that Christina's famous collection came into possession of Livio Odescalchi but was in fact paid for by William “through some discreet intermediary”, in order to repay the old loan of the Odescalchi family.

=== Follow-up ===
It has been suggested that the controversial claim damaged the reputation of Pope Innocent and halted canonisation proceedings. The Roman Catholic Church had been keen to promote Innocent's cause as an active opponent of the Ottomans in the light of the terrorist attack by Islamic fundamentalists on 9/11. It was subsequently reported that the authors had been effectively "blackballed by Italian journalism and publishing" because of the embarrassment caused to the church. A spokesman for the Vatican has denied this.

Subsequent novels in the series have been published in English - Secretum in 2009, and Veritas in 2013.
