= Monaldi & Sorti =

Italian writers

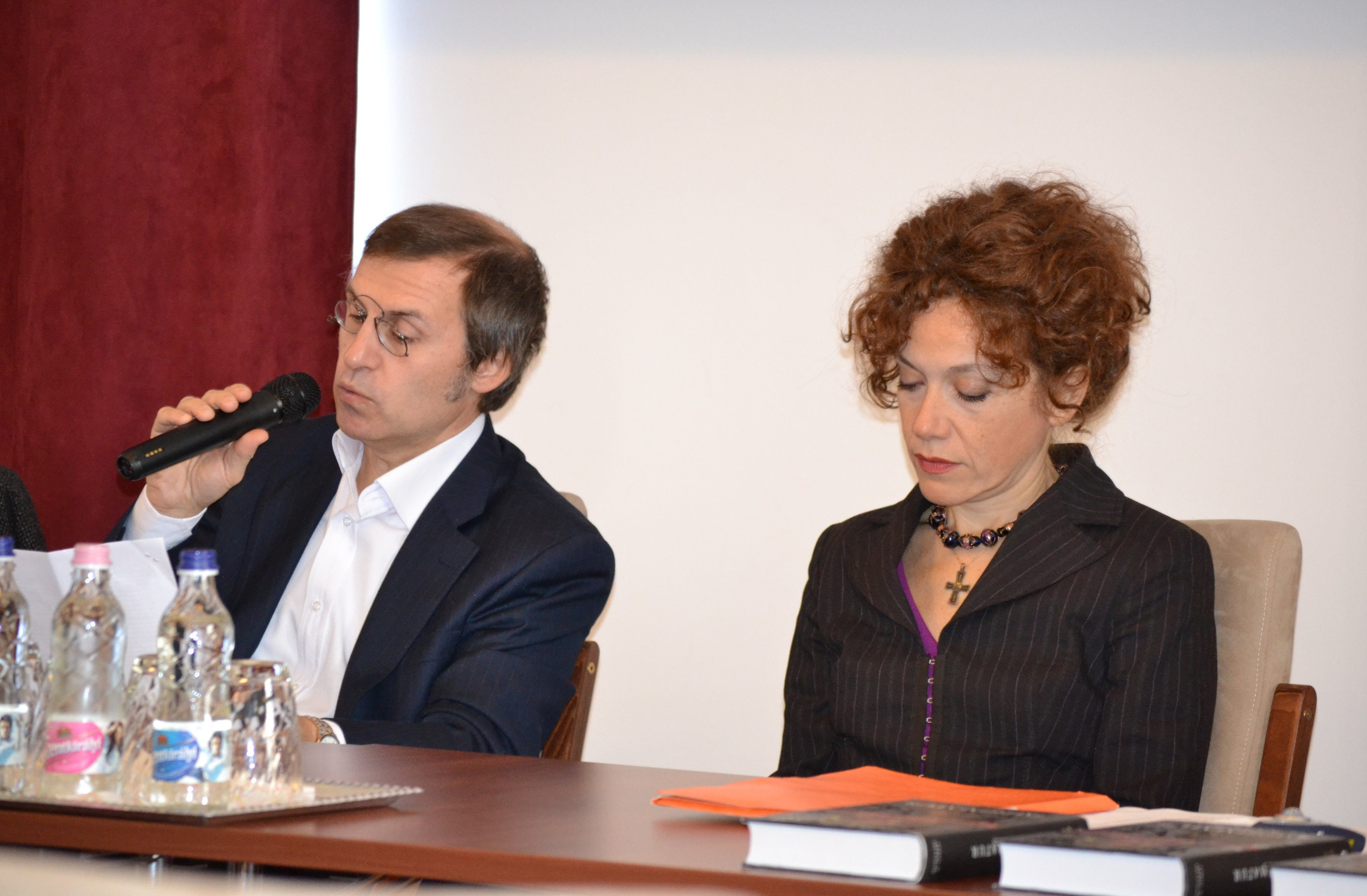
At a performance in Budapest

Monaldi & Sorti is the pen name of the Italian married couple writer duo Rita Monaldi and Francesco Sorti. Rita Monaldi (born 1966) is an Italian journalist and writer. She majored in classical philology and specialized in the history of religions. Francesco Sorti (born 1964) is an Italian journalist and author. He majored in musicology and specialized in the 17th century. They both live with their two young children in Vienna.

== Works ==
A series of literary-historical books, with Atto Melani as a central character:

- Imprimatur
- Secretum
- Veritas
- Mysterium

All the book titles of the series will create the sentence Imprimatur secretum, veritas mysterium. Unicum … The authors translate this as follows: “Even when a secret is printed, the truth is always a mystery. It remains only…” The authors are keeping secret the titles of the final two volumes. They claim the novel was boycotted in Italy.

- Malaparte. Morte come me (2016)
