= Giovanni Battista Treviso =

Italian composer and maestro di capella

Giovanni Battista Treviso (fl. 1650s) was an Italian composer and maestro di capella in Pavia.

== Recordings ==
- Gaudete omnes on Fabellae Sacrae. Savadi. 2008
