= Dyke =

Dyke or dike may refer to:

== General uses ==
- Dyke (slang), a slang word meaning "lesbian"
- Dike (geology), formations of magma or sediment that cut through and across the layering of adjacent rocks
- Dike (mythology), Dikē, the Greek goddess of moral justice
- Dikes, diagonal pliers, also called side-cutting pliers, a hand tool used by electricians and others
- Dyke (automobile company), established 1899

== Structures ==
- Levee, a natural or artificial slope or wall to regulate water levels
- Ditch, a water-filled drainage trench
- A regional term for a dry stone wall

== People ==
- Daryl Dike (born 2000), American soccer player
- Dyke (surname)
- Dyke baronets, a title in the Baronetage of England
- Dykes (surname), a British surname found particularly in northern England

== Places ==
=== Settlements ===
- Dike, Iowa, United States
- Dykes, Missouri, United States
- Dyke, Moray, Scotland
- Dike, Texas, United States
- Dyke, Virginia, United States
- Dyke, Lincolnshire, England
- Little Dyke, Nova Scotia, Canada

=== Earthworks ===
- Car Dyke, a Roman boundary ditch in Eastern England
- Devil's Dyke (disambiguation), one of several ancient embankments or ditches (or both)
- Foss Dyke, a Roman canal in England linking the River Trent to the River Witham at Lincoln
- Offa's Dyke, historic earthwork dividing Mercia and Wales
- Wansdyke, dividing Wessex from the lands southwest of it
- Wat's Dyke, an earthwork running through the northern Welsh Marches from Basingwerk Abbey to Maesbury

=== Geological features ===
- The Great Dyke, a mineral-rich feature that runs through Zimbabwe
- Mount Desire Dyke, an igneous intrusion in South Australia

=== Space ===
- 99 Dike, an asteroid

== See also ==
- Dyke and the Blazers, 1960s R&B group
- Van Dyke
- "D-Yikes!", an episode of South Park
- Winter dyke, another name for a clothes horse
