= Dykes =

Dykes or Dikes may refer to:

== People ==
- Dyke (slang), used as a noun meaning lesbian or used as an adjective to describe things associated with lesbians
- Dykes Potter (1910–2002), American baseball player
- Dykes (surname)

== Places ==
- Dykes, Missouri

== See also ==
- Dikes, diagonal pliers, also called side-cutting pliers, a hand tool used by electricians and others
- Dykes on Bikes, a group of motorcyclists
- Dykes, Camera, Action!, a documentary of 2018
- Dykes & Gorgons, a lesbian magazine of the 1970s
- Dykes to Watch Out For, a comic strip
- Dyke (disambiguation)
