= Van Dijk =

Other names
- Alternative spelling: VanDijk

Van Dijk (Dutch pronunciation: [vɑn ˈdɛik]) is a Dutch toponymic surname meaning "from (the) dike". With 56,441 people, it was the fifth most common name in the Netherlands in 2007. Abroad, people with this surname usually abandoned the ij digraph, resulting in names like Van Dyke and Van Dyk. People with the original surname include:

== Dutch people ==
- Anouk van Dijk (born 1965), choreographer and dancer
- Ans van Dijk (1905–1948), Nazi collaborator during World War II
- Arjan van Dijk (born 1987), football player
- Bill van Dijk (born 1947), singer
- Bryan van Dijk (born 1981), judoka
- Cilia van Dijk (1941–2023), film producer
- Daan van Dijk (1907–1986), track cyclist
- Dick van Dijk (1946–1997), football striker
- Dick van Dijk (born 1970), darts player
- Diederik van Dijk (born 1971), politician
- Dominique van Dijk (born 1979), football midfielder
- Edith van Dijk (born 1973), swimmer
- Ellen van Dijk (born 1987), road and track cyclist
- Frans Van Dijk (1853–1939), Belgian architect
- Gé van Dijk (1923–2005), football player and coach
- Gerrit van Dijk (1938–2012), animator, film maker, and painter
- Gerrit van Dijk (mathematician) (1939–2022), mathematician
- Gijs van Dijk (born 1980), politician and union leader
- Gregoor van Dijk (born 1981), football midfielder
- Herman K. van Dijk (1946–2025), economist
- Jan van Dijk (born 1952), sociologist and communication scientist
- Jan van Dijk (born 1956), football midfielder
- Jappie van Dijk (born 1944), speed skater
- Jasper van Dijk (born 1971), politician
- Joeri van Dijk (born 1983), sailor
- Johannes van Dijk (1868–1938), rower
- Joost van Dijk (died 1632), privateer and first settler of the Virgin Islands
- Kay van Dijk (born 1984), volleyball player
- Kees van Dijk (1931–2008), politician
- Ko van Dijk (1916–1978), theater and television actor
- Leon van Dijk (born 1992), football player
- Louis van Dijk (1941–2020), pianist
- Marijn van Dijk (born 1979), developmental psychologist and linguist
- Nelis van Dijk (1904–1969), boxer
- Niek van Dijk (born 1951), orthopaedic surgeon
- Olger van Dijk (born 1979), Dutch politician
- Otwin van Dijk (born 1975), politician
- Peter van Dijk (born 1952), politician
- Philip van Dijk (1683–1753), painter
- Philip van Dijk (footballer) (1885–1937), midfielder
- Pieter van Dijk (born 1943), Dutch legal scholar and judge
- Rob van Dijk (born 1969), football goalkeeper
- Rudi Martinus van Dijk (1932–2003), composer
- Ryan van Dijk (born 1990), football midfielder
- Sam van Dijk (born 1996), basketball player
- Sergio van Dijk (born 1982), football player
- Stefan van Dijk (born 1976), racing cyclist
- Steven van Dijk (born 1969), cricket bowler
- Teun A. van Dijk (born 1943), scholar in linguistics
- Virgil van Dijk (born 1991), football player
- Wendy van Dijk (born 1976), actress and television presenter

== Other people ==
- Anne-Mette van Dijk (born 1968), Danish badminton player
- Chris VanDijk, American politician
- Germaine van Dijk (born 1983), Surinamese football player
- Hilbert Van Dijk (1918–2001), Australian fencer
- Jace Van Dijk (born 1981), Australian rugby league player
- Jennifer van Dijk-Silos (born 1954), Surinamese Minister of Justice and Police
- Mijk van Dijk (born 1963), German DJ
- Nikki Van Dijk (born 1994), Australian professional surfer
- Ruel (born 2002), Australian singer-songwriter

== See also ==
- van (Dutch)
- Van Dijck
- Van Dyk
- Van Dyke
- Van Dyck (surname)
