= Did You Know =

Did You Know may refer to:

- Did You Know...?, an advertising campaign for GEICO
- "Did You Know", 2016 single by Pauly D

== See also ==
- Do You Know (disambiguation)
- DYK (disambiguation)
- "How Did You Know", a single by electronic dance music producer and remixer Kurtis Mantronik
- "Mary, Did You Know?", a Christmas song with lyrics written by Mark Lowry and music written by Buddy Greene
- Did You Know Gaming?, a video game–focused blog about video game related trivia and facts
- Did You Know People Can Fly?, the debut album by Kaddisfly
