= Thomas Dyke =

Thomas Dyke may refer to:

- Sir Thomas Dyke, 1st Baronet (c. 1650–1706), English Tory politician
- Thomas Dyke (Seaford MP) (1619–1669), MP for Seaford
- Sir Thomas Dyke, 2nd Baronet (c. 1700–1756), of the Dyke baronets
- Sir Thomas Dyke, 4th Baronet (1763–1831), of the Dyke baronets
- Thomas Dyke (cricketer) (1801–1866), English cricketer
- Tom Hart Dyke (born 1976), English horticulturist, author and plant hunter

== See also ==
- Thomas Dyke Acland (disambiguation)
- Dyke (surname)
