= Do You Know =

Do You Know may refer to:

== Music ==
=== Albums ===
- Do You Know (Michelle Williams album) an album from Michelle Williams
  - "Do You Know", the album's title track
- Do You Know (Jessica Simpson album), an album from Jessica Simpson
  - "Do You Know", the album's title track, featuring Dolly Parton

=== Songs ===
- "Do You Know" (Michelle Gayle song), a 1997 song by Michelle Gayle
- "Do You Know? (The Ping Pong Song)", an Enrique Iglesias song
- "Do You Know (What It Takes)", a Robyn song
- "Do You Know", a song by The Cranberries from Wake Up and Smell the Coffee
- "Do You Know", a song by Fleetwood Mac from Behind the Mask
- "Do You Know?", a song by Puff Daddy from No Way Out
- "Do You Know", a song by Quiet Drive from Leaving Dramatics EP
- "Do You Know", a song by Sick Puppies from Welcome to the Real World
- "Do You Know", a song by The Slackers from The Question
- "Do You Know", a song by Soul Asylum from Say What You Will, Clarence... Karl Sold the Truck
- "Do You Know", a song by Tonic from Head on Straight
- "Do You Know", a song by Total from Total
- "Do You Know", a song by Uriah Heep from Firefly
- "Do You Know", a song by Xscape from Traces of My Lipstick
- "Do You Know (Knife in Your Back)", a song from Killradio
- "넌 알고 있니" (Korean for "Do You Know?"), a song from Park Jung-min
- "Do You Know (I Go Crazy)", a single by Angel City (vocal Lara McAllen)
- "Theme from Mahogany", also known as "Do You Know Where You're Going To" or just "Do You Know"

== Television ==
- Do You Know? (TV series), a British children's TV show presented by Maddie Moate

== See also ==
- Did You Know (disambiguation)
- Do U Know, an album from Janice Vidal
- Do You Know Squarepusher, an album from Squarepusher
- DYK (disambiguation)
