= Sleeping Beauty (1959 film) =

1959 animated Disney film

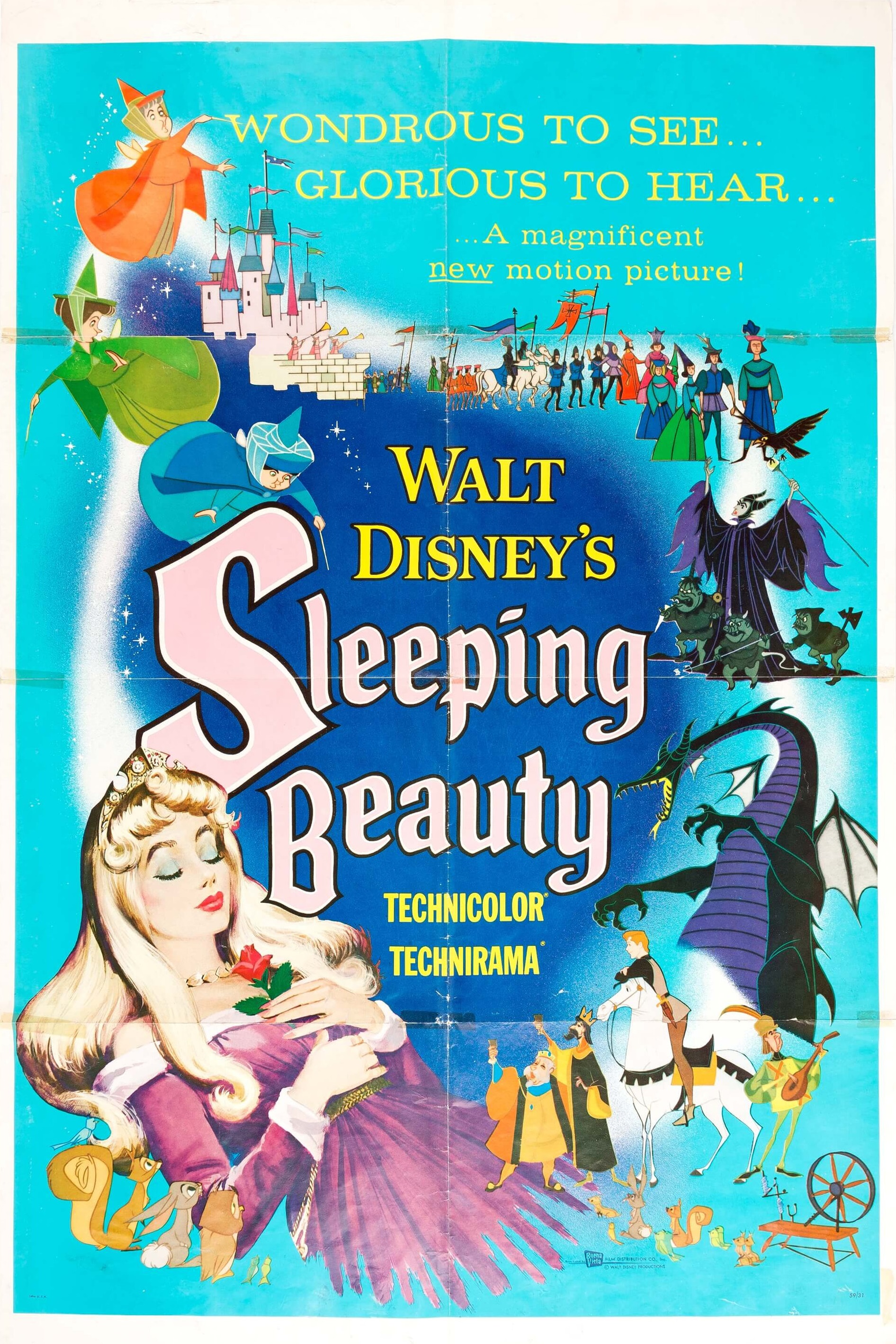
- Theatrical release poster
- Directed by: Supervising director: Clyde Geronimi; Sequence directors: Eric Larson; Wolfgang Reitherman; Les Clark
- Story by: Erdman Penner; Joe Rinaldi; Winston Hibler; Bill Peet; Ted Sears; Ralph Wright; Milt Banta
- Based on: "Sleeping Beauty" by Charles Perrault
- Produced by: Walt Disney
- Starring: Mary Costa; Bill Shirley; Eleanor Audley; Verna Felton; Barbara Luddy; Barbara Jo Allen; Taylor Holmes; Bill Thompson
- Edited by: Roy M. Brewer Jr.; Donald Halliday
- Music by: George Bruns
- Production company: Walt Disney Productions
- Distributed by: Buena Vista Film Distribution
- Release date: January 29, 1959
- Running time: 75 minutes
- Country: United States
- Language: English
- Budget: $6 million
- Box office: $51.6 million (United States and Canada)

Sleeping Beauty is a 1959 American animated musical fantasy film produced by Walt Disney Productions and released by Buena Vista Film Distribution. Based on Charles Perrault's 1697 fairy tale, the film follows Princess Aurora, who was cursed by the evil fairy Maleficent to die from pricking her finger on the spindle of a spinning wheel on her 16th birthday; she is rescued by three good fairies, who change the curse so that Aurora falls into a deep sleep and will be awakened by true love's kiss. The production was supervised by Clyde Geronimi, and was directed by Wolfgang Reitherman, Eric Larson, and Les Clark. It features the voices of Mary Costa, Bill Shirley, Eleanor Audley, Verna Felton, Barbara Luddy, Barbara Jo Allen, Taylor Holmes, and Bill Thompson.

Sleeping Beauty began development in 1950. The film took nearly a decade and $6 million (equivalent to $66,267,000 in 2025) to produce, and was Disney's most expensive animated feature at the time. The film's tapestry-like art style was devised by Eyvind Earle, who was inspired by pre-Renaissance European art; its score and songs, composed by George Bruns, were based on Pyotr Tchaikovsky's 1889 ballet. Sleeping Beauty was the first animated film to use the Super Technirama 70 widescreen process and was the second full-length animated feature filmed in anamorphic widescreen, following Lady and the Tramp (1955).

Sleeping Beauty was released in theaters on January 29, 1959, to mixed reviews from critics. The film was a box-office bomb in its initial release, grossing $5.3 million (equivalent to $58,536,000 in 2025), and losing $900,000 (equivalent to $9,940,000 in 2025) for the distributor. Consequently, many employees from the animation studio were laid off. Sleeping Beauty's re-releases have been successful, and it has become one of Disney's most artistically acclaimed features. The film was nominated for the Academy Award for Best Scoring of a Musical Picture at the 32nd Academy Awards.

Maleficent, a live-action reimagining of the film from the eponymous character's perspective, was released in 2014, followed by a sequel in 2019. The latter year, Sleeping Beauty was selected for preservation in the United States Library of Congress's National Film Registry as "culturally, historically, or aesthetically significant".

== Plot ==
In 14th-century Europe, King Stefan and Queen Leah (Note: The Queen is unnamed in the film, likely due to her minor role. She is referred to as Leah in the film's 1993 book adaptation by A. L. Singer.) welcome their newborn daughter, Aurora, and proclaim a holiday for their subjects to pay homage to the princess. At her christening, Aurora is betrothed to Prince Phillip, the son of Stefan's friend King Hubert, in order to unite their kingdoms. The three good fairies, Flora, Fauna, and Merryweather, each bless Aurora with one gift. After Flora and Fauna give her beauty and song, the evil fairy Maleficent appears, angry at not being invited. She places a curse on the princess, predicting that before the sun sets on her sixteenth birthday, Aurora will prick her finger on the spindle of a spinning wheel and die. Merryweather uses her gift to soften the curse so that Aurora will instead fall into a deep sleep until a true love's kiss breaks the spell.

Still fearful, Stefan orders all the kingdom's spinning wheels to be burned. Flora, Fauna, and Merryweather devise a plan to hide Aurora in a secluded location and raise her themselves until her sixteenth birthday, to which Stefan and Leah reluctantly agree. The fairies move into a forest cottage, giving up magic and living like human peasants; they also rename Aurora to Briar Rose.

On Aurora's sixteenth birthday, the fairies send her to gather berries so they can prepare a surprise party. In the forest, Aurora sings to her animal friends, drawing the attention of Phillip, now a handsome young man. They fall in love without revealing their names, and Aurora invites Phillip to the cottage that evening. Meanwhile, Flora and Merryweather have a duel with magic wands over the color of Aurora's birthday dress, drawing the attention of Maleficent's pet raven, Diablo. (Note: The raven's name is not mentioned in the film. He was referred to as Diablo by the animators during the film's production.) When Aurora returns and tells the fairies that she has fallen in love, they reveal her true identity (which Diablo overhears) and inform her that she must never see her beloved again. Meanwhile, Phillip tells his father about the girl he met and wants to marry, unaware that she is the princess to whom he is betrothed. Hubert fails to dissuade him, and Phillip rides off to the cottage.

Shortly before sunset, the fairies bring Aurora to the castle for her birthday celebration. Maleficent appears as a glowing ball of light and hypnotically beckons Aurora to a tower room, where Aurora pricks her finger on the spindle of a spinning wheel (that Maleficent conjures) and falls into a deep sleep. The fairies place the sleeping Aurora in the highest tower, and put the entire kingdom to sleep until she is awakened. While doing so, Flora overhears a conversation between Hubert and Stefan, and realizes that Phillip is the man Aurora met. The fairies rush to the cottage, only to discover that Phillip has been abducted by Maleficent.

At her domain, the Forbidden Mountain, Maleficent reveals Aurora's identity to Phillip; she also tells her plans to lock Phillip away until he is an old man on the verge of death before releasing him to meet Aurora, who will not age a day. The fairies rescue Phillip and arm him with the magical Sword of Truth and the Shield of Virtue to fend off Maleficent's goons. Maleficent surrounds Stefan's castle with a forest of thorns, but Phillip breaks through it. Then, she transforms into a fire-breathing dragon, confronting Phillip personally. The fairies enchant Phillip's sword, which he throws into Maleficent's heart, killing her.

Phillip finds Aurora and awakens her with a kiss, bringing the rest of the kingdom out of their slumber. The two descend to the ballroom, where Aurora reunites with her parents and happily dances with Phillip, as the good fairies look on with joy.

== Voice cast ==
- Mary Costa as Princess Aurora, also known as Briar Rose and Sleeping Beauty, an innocent and romantic daughter of King Stefan and Queen Leah who is cursed by Maleficent.
- Bill Shirley as Prince Phillip, King Hubert's bold and spirited son and Aurora's "true love", to whom she was betrothed. He is occasionally accompanied by his horse, Samson.
- Eleanor Audley as Maleficent, a powerful evil fairy and self-proclaimed "Mistress of All Evil" who casts a curse on Aurora and is responsible for all misfortune in King Stefan's kingdom.
- Verna Felton as Flora, the domineering and responsible self-appointed leader of the Three Good Fairies. Her signature color is red.
- Barbara Luddy as Merryweather, a feisty and impulsive good fairy who challenges Flora's leadership. Her signature color is blue.
- Barbara Jo Allen as Fauna, a sweet and affectionate good fairy who is a peacemaker between Flora and Merryweather. Her signature color is green.
- Taylor Holmes as King Stefan, Aurora's placid and dignified father.
- Bill Thompson as King Hubert, Phillip's jovial and bombastic father.

Candy Candido, Pinto Colvig, and Bob Amsberry voiced the Goons, Maleficent's bumbling but loyal henchmen. Candido also voiced Diablo, Maleficent's pet raven. Dallas McKennon voiced the owl, one of Aurora's animal friends, with Purv Pullen providing the sounds of other forest animals. Marvin Miller was the film's narrator.

== Production ==
=== Story development ===
Walt Disney first considered making an animated version of Charles Perrault's 1697 fairy tale "Sleeping Beauty" in 1938; Joe Grant did preliminary story work in the late 1930s, but the project did not materialize at the time. After a preview audience's positive response to Cinderella, Disney registered Sleeping Beauty as a planned production title with the Motion Picture Association of America on January 19, 1950. In November of that year, the development of the film was confirmed by the Los Angeles Times. Disney envisioned Sleeping Beauty as the pinnacle of his studio's achievements in animation and was willing to pool all the resources needed to achieve that. He also wanted the film to stand out from his previous fairy tale features, Snow White and the Seven Dwarfs (1937) and Cinderella (1950), and repeatedly told his staff during production that it had to be different.

Key story work was done by Ted Sears, Winston Hibler, Bill Peet, and Ralph Wright, who were joined by other story artists as production continued. They discarded the second half of Perrault's original tale, which tells about the life of sleeping beauty married to an unknown prince, and focused on its first half to develop a more compelling romance between the characters. The earliest story outline was written by April 1951, featuring a climactic wake-up kiss and the encounter between prince and princess before she succumbs to the curse. The story artists also expanded the role of fairies (who had been reduced from eight to four), turning the good fairies into comical guardians of the princess, and the evil fairy into a more powerful villain. The outline indicated the names of the fairies and their corresponding magical abilities: Tranquility, the Fairy of Dreams; Fernadell, the Fairy of the Forest; Merryweather, the Fairy of the Elements; and Maleficent, the Fairy of Darkness. In this version of the story, Maleficent conjures an indestructible spinning wheel, which the king and queen unsuccessfully try to get rid of before they are forced to never let their daughter out of the castle. The princess was envisioned as a "poor little rich girl", burdened with her royal lineage and dreaming of leaving the castle and exploring the world. Shortly before her sixteenth birthday, the princess disguises herself as a maidservant and secretly escapes to a nearby forest (or country fair), where she meets the prince and falls in love with him. The prince travels to a faraway land and returns a few years later to fight Maleficent (with the help of the good fairies), find the sleeping princess, and wake her up with a kiss. The story ideas at the time also included the good fairies attempting to surround the castle with a protective circle, and Maleficent having a falcon sidekick (who was rewritten as a comically incompetent vulture in a later treatment).

We had a lot of problems. We were fighting to break away from what we had done in the past. Sleeping Beauty was tough, because it had many of the elements we had already used in Snow White and Cinderella. You've got to give the creators new things to work with so they'll be able to keep their enthusiasm up. You're in trouble if they start saying, "Haven't we done this before?" We had to find out what we had and whether it would please the public. I'm never sure myself what they're going to buy.

— Walt Disney, on the difficulties of adapting Sleeping Beauty as an animated feature

By June 1952, the full storyboard of Sleeping Beauty was completed, but Disney rejected it, finding its approach too similar to his studio's earlier fairy tale features. The story artists discarded the original version and started from scratch, but kept several ideas from earlier suggestions, such as the prince's encounter with the princess before the curse is fulfilled, and a shorter deep sleep. Part of the difficulty in production was in differentiating the studio's third princess, who had been named Aurora, from Snow White and Cinderella. The story artists came up with an idea of the fairies raising her in a forest cottage, with Aurora unaware of her background or the danger she faced. She was also given a more contemporary personality to make her more appealing to audiences. The improvement of his animators' skill in drafting a realistic male figure prompted Disney to expand the role of the prince, who had been named Phillip. The story team initially developed a sequence in which Aurora and Phillip meet during a treasure hunt, but later abandoned it, feeling it deviated too much from the central storyline; instead, it was written that the characters would meet in the forest by chance, as in the early 1951 outline. To further establish Phillip as Aurora's "true love", the story artists developed a plot in which Maleficent kidnaps him and plans to keep him prisoner in her castle for a century (which would also be a reference to the 100-year slumber in Perrault's story).

Disney wanted a more serious narrative direction for Sleeping Beauty, which resulted in several gags and sequences being cut; in one, the Three Good Fairies (who had been renamed Flora, Fauna, and Merryweather) try to bake a birthday cake for Aurora and accidentally blow up the oven. The good fairies were originally intended to rule the domains indicated by their names (Flora would be in charge of flowers and plants, Fauna would oversee the animals and birds, and Merryweather would control the climate), but Disney discarded the idea, feeling that it did not advance the central storyline. In earlier versions of the story, Aurora directly encounters Maleficent, who manipulates her into pricking her finger on the spindle, but Disney requested that the scene be rewritten so that Maleficent would lure Aurora with hypnosis, believing that the "eerie, haunting presentation of a victim powerless in the hands of evil" would be a stronger option. Several story elements originated from abandoned ideas for Snow White and the Seven Dwarfs (1937) and Cinderella (1950), including the prince and princess dancing in the clouds, and Phillip's escape from Maleficent's domain.

=== Casting ===
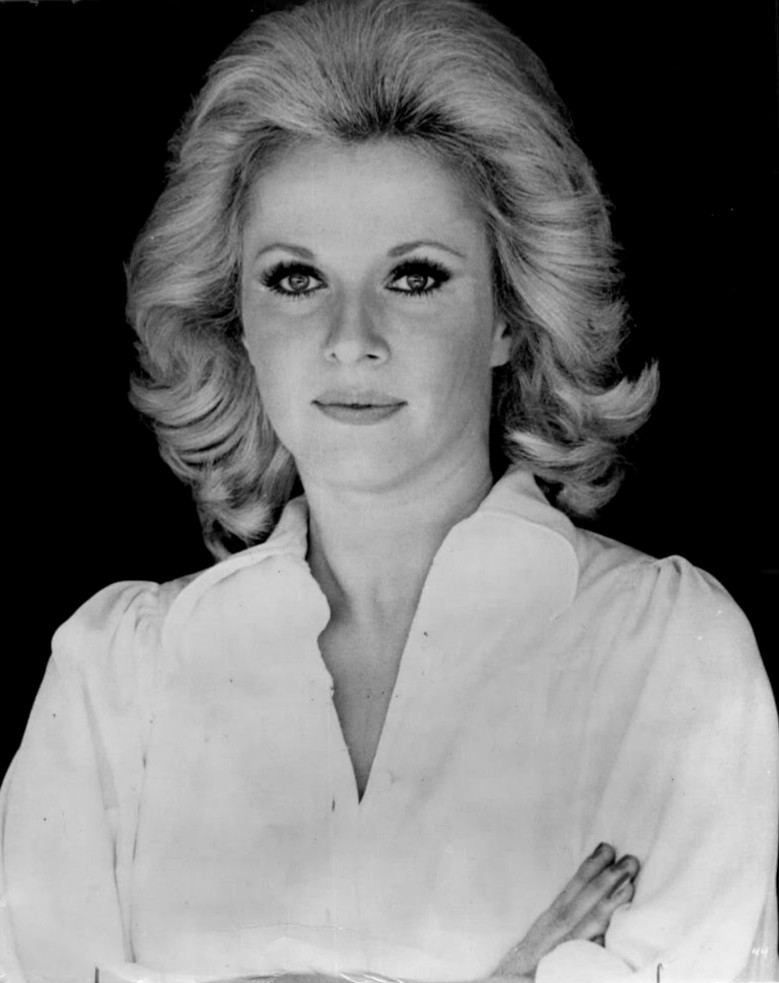
Mary Costa, who provided the voice of Princess Aurora

Walt Disney spent three years searching for a voice for Princess Aurora and considered shelving the project entirely before Mary Costa was cast by June 1952. She was invited to audition by the film's original composer Walter Schumann, who heard her singing at a dinner party for the entertainment industry. Born in Knoxville, Tennessee, Costa had a strong Southern accent, which nearly prevented her from being cast until she proved that she could speak with a British accent. Disney personally contacted Costa within hours of her audition to confirm that she had the role. Before Costa was cast, LP records by forty female singers were heard by the story artists, and fifteen of them auditioned in person. Costa recorded her lines for three years, from 1952 to 1955. Twenty singers auditioned for the role of Prince Phillip, and Bill Shirley, who had a high baritone voice and experience in light opera, was the final choice. Before Shirley and Costa were selected, they made audition records together to determine if their voices complemented each other; Disney was convinced that they did, and approved the casting.

Disney personally suggested Eleanor Audley for the role of Maleficent. Audley initially refused, since she had tuberculosis and was unsure if she would be strong enough for recording sessions, but reconsidered when she began feeling better. Regarding her voice work for the character, Audley later said that she "tried to do a lot of contrasting to be both sweet and nasty at the same time." Barbara Jo Allen was cast as Fauna, who had been frequently compared by the story artists to Vera Vague (Jo Allen's character on Bob Hope's radio show), and Barbara Luddy (who done the voice of Lady in Disney's previous film Lady and the Tramp) got the role of Merryweather. Several of the studio's voice regulars were cast in the film, including Verna Felton as Flora, Bill Thompson as King Hubert, and Candy Candido as one of Maleficent's goons. Felton is also believed to have been the voice of Queen Leah, but the studio has no record of who voiced the character. A number of actors auditioned for the role of King Stefan (including Hans Conried) before Taylor Holmes was cast; this was Holmes's final film role before his death in September 1959, eight months after the film's release.

=== Animation ===
==== Art direction ====
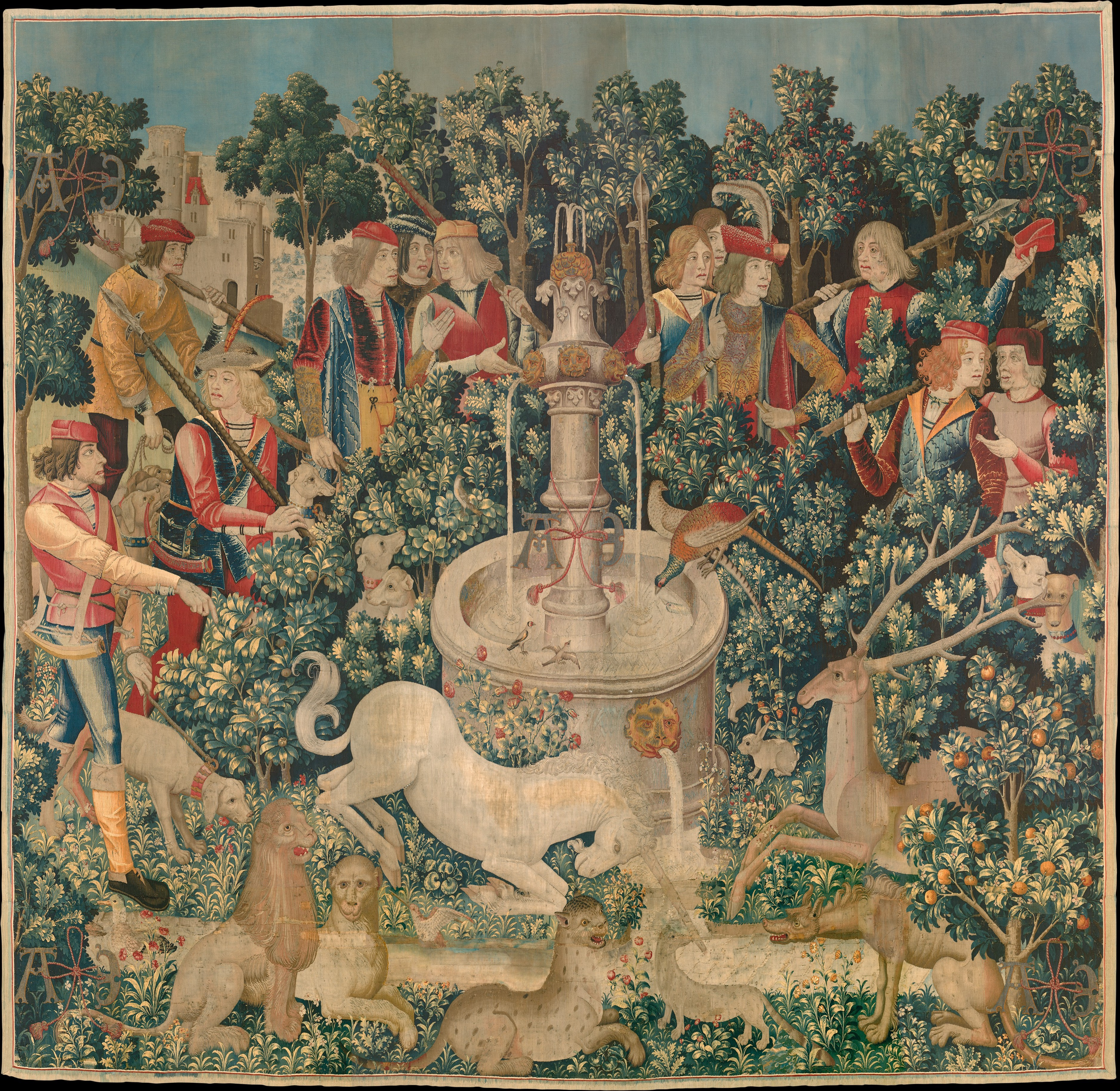
The Unicorn Tapestries are credited for providing a starting point in the film's artistic direction.

To distinguish Sleeping Beauty from his previous features, Walt Disney decided to discard their established soft and rounded design in favor of a more stylized approach. Ken Anderson and Don DaGradi were appointed production designers for the film. By December 1952, Kay Nielsen had created the first styling sketches for the film, which suggested an ethereal look with soft colors. While impressed with the artwork, Anderson felt that Nielsen's pastels would be difficult to translate into animation, so Disney asked John Hench to rework Nielsen's paintings with opaque cel paints. By April 1953, Nielsen had left the studio, and his design was rejected. The film's final style was developed after Hench's visit to the Cloisters, where he saw the Unicorn Tapestries series; he brought reproductions of the tapestries back to the studio and made sketches inspired by the museum visit, suggesting them as a visual template for the film's design. Disney approved the idea, and background artist Eyvind Earle made trial paintings based on Hench's sketches. Wanting Sleeping Beauty to have a unified look from start to finish, Disney made Earle both the film's color stylist and artistic director, giving him unprecedented control of its appearance, and leaving Anderson and Don DaGradi as only nominal production designers.

I wanted stylized, simplified Gothic. Straight, tall, perpendicular lines like Gothic cathedrals ... I used one-point perspective. I rearranged the bushes and trees in geometrical patterns. I made a medieval tapestry out of the surface wherever possible. All my foregrounds were tapestry designs of decorative weeds and flowers and grasses. And since it is obvious that the Gothic style and detail evolved from the Arabic influence acquired during the Crusades, I found it perfectly permissible to use all the wonderful patterns and details found in Persian miniatures. And since Persian miniatures had a lot in common with Chinese and Japanese art, I felt it was OK for me to inject quite a bit of Japanese art, especially in the close-up of leaves and overhanging branches.

— Eyvind Earle, on devising the film's background styling

Earle's styling was influenced by pre-Renaissance Northern European art (including the works of Pieter Bruegel, Albrecht Dürer, Huybrecht van Eyck, Giotto di Bondone, and Sandro Botticelli), as well as of Gothic and Persian art, medieval tapestries, and Japanese prints. His primary inspiration for Sleeping Beauty was the illuminated book of hours by Herman and Jean Limbourg, Très Riches Heures du Duc de Berry, from which he took key colors such as the yellow-green for Maleficent's flames, and the pink and blue for Aurora's royal dress. Films such as Henry V (1944) and Romeo and Juliet (1954) also influenced Earle's design. Earle combined historical references with a modernist vision, suggesting a more stylized and boldly colored appearance for backgrounds and characters, unlike anything seen in previous Disney animated features. In his five years of working on the film, Earle made about three hundred visual development paintings, hundreds of thumbnail sequence sketches, and dozens of key background paintings, some fifteen feet long. Over eight hundred other backgrounds for the film were created by Frank Armitage, Thelma Witmer, Al Dempster, Walt Peregoy, Bill Layne, Ralph Hulett, Dick Anthony, Fil Mottola, Richard H. Thomas, and Anthony Rizzo, who worked under Earle's supervision and closely followed his style to ensure consistency in the film's design. Sleeping Beauty was the first film of the studio in which background paintings defined its art direction.

Although the layout artists and animators were impressed with Earle's paintings, they became discouraged by working in a style that seemed to them too austere and modernist for the fairy tale feature. Animators complained that Earle's design and color styling hindered character animation, and struggled to make the characters stand out against his detailed background paintings. Earle was argumentative and unwilling to compromise, which resulted in conflicts between him and the animators. At one point, Frank Thomas and Milt Kahl rebelled and went to Disney's office to complain, but Disney settled the dispute in Earle's favor, insisting on a unified look for Sleeping Beauty and arguing that animators had always previously homogenized the style of the inspirational artwork (such as that of Mary Blair). Earle's design prompted Walt Disney to film Sleeping Beauty in Super Technirama 70 as the first animated film in this format. This decision presented additional difficulties for animators and layout artists, who had to work with large 48-inch sheets of paper (instead of the standard 16-inch ones), and create twice as much art to fill the frame. Sleeping Beauty was the last hand-inked Disney animated feature film before the studio switched to the Xerox process with One Hundred and One Dalmatians (1961). Xerox was partially used in Sleeping Beauty to animate the forest of thorns in the final battle sequence.

==== Live-action reference ====
Before animation began, a live-action reference version with actors in costumes was filmed for the animators to study; Walt Disney insisted on this, because he wanted the characters to be as close to real life as possible. Several animators (including Milt Kahl) objected to this method, considering it constraining and uncreative. By March 1954, Helene Stanley was hired to provide live-action references for Princess Aurora. She was chosen from over three hundred candidates interviewed for the role. Stanley's costume for Aurora's woodland alter ego, Briar Rose, was created by Alice Estes at the behest of Marc Davis as her first job assignment for the Disney studio. Stanley also provided the reference for some scenes with the Three Good Fairies, along with Spring Byington, Madge Blake, Frances Bavier, Marjorie Bennett, and Trudi Schoop.

Prince Phillip was modeled by Ed Kemmer. For the footage of the final battle sequence, Kemmer had to ride a wooden wagon imitating a horse which was controlled by the animators. Cubby O'Brien was a model for young Phillip. The live-action reference for Maleficent was provided by her voice actress, Eleanor Audley, and dancer Jane Fowler. Hans Conried and Don Barclay were live-action references for King Stefan and King Hubert. The lackey who serves wine to the kings in the "Skumps" scene was modeled by Franklin Pangborn.

==== Character animation ====
Layout artist Tom Oreb, whose designs employed a "straight-against-curve" motif similar to Earle's backgrounds, was the film's character stylist. Oreb was the first Disney artist to receive a credit in that capacity. Working closely with Earle (who also had decision-making capability in character designs and color schemes), he created early sketches for most of the characters, incorporating strong horizontal and vertical planes like those in the background paintings. The studio's ink and paint department made finished cels of Oreb's sketches, which were placed over Earle's backgrounds to ensure that the styles would match. The animators complained that Oreb's designs, like Earle's styling, were too rigid to animate. Ken Anderson stated that the characters became "really, unfortunately, quite stiff. In order to fit this mannered background, they, too, took on a sort of cylindrical, geometrical shape that didn't lend itself as well to the ... Well, you might say, the Bambi type of animation. It wasn't really possible just to make the characters fit the style and still be quite as attractive."

Marc Davis, who embraced Earle's style, was the supervising animator of Princess Aurora. He also worked on the character's design along with Oreb, whose earlier designs of Aurora were influenced by Audrey Hepburn. Stylizing the character to match the backgrounds, Oreb incorporated vertical lines into the folds of her dresses and two-dimensional swirls into her hair, while Davis sharpened her features and clothes, adding Art Nouveau and Art Deco style to her curls. Aurora's final design was more refined than those of previous Disney heroines, and therefore required more attention to detail than any animated character before. Iwao Takamoto, who was the quality control animator for Aurora, described working with her animation drawings as a "laborious job" which limited in-betweeners such as himself to completing only six or seven drawings per day, a small fraction of the twenty-four required for each second of film.

In designing Maleficent, Marc Davis experimented with flame-like shapes and triangular color patterns.

Davis was also tasked with supervising Maleficent's animation and design, which was inspired by a painting in a Czechoslovak art book that he found in his home library. Davis' original designs had red trim on Maleficent's costume to highlight its flame-like shape, but Earle requested to change it to lavender because red would appear too strong. Davis also added horns and a collar resembling bat wings to give the character a more diabolic look, and endowed her costume with a reptilian quality to foreshadow her dragon form. Animating Maleficent was challenging for Davis because of the character's tendency to soliloquize and her lack of physical contact with other characters; this was resolved with the introduction of Diablo, Maleficent's raven, whom Davis also designed and animated. Maleficent's dragon form was animated by Eric Cleworth, who based its head movements on those of a rattlesnake.

Frank Thomas and Ollie Johnston, who struggled the most to adapt to Earle's style, were the supervising animators of Flora, Fauna, and Merryweather. Walt Disney initially urged that the characters be homogeneous, but Thomas and Johnston objected, feeling that it would be more interesting for each fairy to have a distinct personality. Oreb's early designs portrayed the characters in a strictly geometric style, reflecting the three primary shapes (square, triangle, and circle), but this was too difficult to animate, and was discarded. The final design was set after Don DaGradi created sketches suggesting making the fairies' faces softer, but keeping their capes and headdresses angular to match the background styling. Thomas and Johnston studied the movements of old women they saw at wedding receptions and grocery stores for help in animation, and the fairies' costume design was influenced by wardrobe books for medieval Scandinavian and German-style attire.

Milt Kahl animated Prince Phillip, but was displeased with the character's limited emotional range. He also animated King Stefan, King Hubert, and Phillip's horse, Samson, whose design was influenced by the artwork of Ronald Searle. Kahl's characters were co-animated by John Lounsbery, who also worked on Aurora's forest-animal friends and the pig-like leader of Maleficent's goons. Among other animators working on the film were Wolfgang Reitherman, who directed the climactic dragon battle sequence; Les Clark, who directed the opening scene in which the townspeople march to the castle for Aurora's christening; and John Sibley, who animated the lackey.

=== Production delays ===
It was very difficult for him to put his mind on this picture. I think mainly because Walt was working on Disneyland, he was occupied with that ... He just didn't have time or energy to come in as often as we'd like him to. He come in if we pressed him, but otherwise he'd just say "Well, I think you're doing okay. Why don't you go ahead, and I'll come in later" ... He just didn't have the creative juices going on this picture than he did on most of them.

— Ollie Johnston, on Walt Disney's involvement in the film's production

In 1952, Walt Disney planned to release Sleeping Beauty in 1955, but the production experienced substantial delays. By April 1954, the film was scheduled for a February 1957 release, which was soon postponed to Christmas 1957. The release was later rescheduled for Christmas 1958, with the film eventually premiering in January 1959.

Production began in July 1953, when supervising director Wilfred Jackson started work on a pilot sequence of Princess Aurora and Prince Phillip meeting in the forest. Jackson recorded dialogue, assembled a story reel, and was starting to assign preliminary animation, but Disney was dissatisfied with the original version of the scene. Jackson (along with Ted Sears and two other story artists) had to extensively rewrite it over the next few months before Disney approved the revised version. In December 1953, Jackson had a heart attack and was replaced by Eric Larson, whose unit would animate the scene. By 1954, the film's production was still in its early stages. In July of that year, Disney began developing his own theme park and a number of television series, such as The Mickey Mouse Club, and most of the studio personnel working on Sleeping Beauty at the time were assigned to develop those projects. The film's production was suspended for two years, but not fully abandoned, as the project was given to Erdman Penner and Joe Rinaldi for further development, while the castle at Disneyland was named Sleeping Beauty Castle to promote the film. By early 1955, the full storyboard had been completed and was ready to be discussed with Disney.

Production of Sleeping Beauty resumed in December 1956. Although Disney insisted on overseeing every aspect of the film, he remained focused on his theme park, and animators (such as Milt Kahl) blamed him for effectively delaying the production. Due to the complexity of Eyvind Earle's styling, the animation process progressed slowly: 2,500 feet of animation had been completed by January 1957, with 3,775 feet yet to be done. Around the same time, Disney began to show disinterest in Sleeping Beauty; according to studio executive Harry Tytle, after the screening of the finished footage on August 22, 1957, Disney was tired and did not pay the project the attention he would have given years earlier. Determined to make Sleeping Beauty a "moving illustration" (as Disney demanded of him at the beginning of production), Larson spent several years working on the forest scene, which eventually cost $10,000. Disney was dissatisfied with the film's growing budget, and as a result, a quota system was introduced to keep costs down, requiring animators to create a specified number of drawings per day.

Relatively late in production, Disney removed Larson as supervising director and replaced him with Clyde Geronimi, who had creative differences with Earle. Geronimi argued that some of Earle's background paintings (such as those used in the dungeon scene) lacked the mood and were overly detailed to the detriment of character animation. By that time, Disney also felt that too much focus was on the film's design at the expense of its story. In March 1958, before Sleeping Beauty was completed, Earle left the Disney studio for John Sutherland Productions; Geronimi then had the background paintings softened with an airbrush so they did not compete with the animation.

== Music ==
The use of music from Pyotr Tchaikovsky's 1889 ballet The Sleeping Beauty was discussed early in the film's development, but the idea was initially discarded due to the potential difficulty of adapting Tchaikovsky's ballet as a film score. Jack Lawrence and Sammy Fain were signed to write the film's original songs in April 1952, and Walter Schumann was the composer. A song score was produced by late summer of that year, which included the main title song and its reprise by Fain and Victor Young; the opening number, "Holiday", sung by the royal subjects celebrating Princess Aurora's birth, followed by "It Happens I Have a Picture", in which King Stefan and King Hubert discuss the virtues of their respective children; "Sunbeams (Bestowal of Gifts)", sung by the Three Good Fairies and Maleficent as they bestow gifts on Aurora; "Where in the World", Aurora's solo, followed by the love song "Once Upon a Dream", in which she meets Prince Phillip; and "Mirage (Follow Your Heart)", in which Aurora is lured to the spinning wheel.

After Eyvind Earle became the film's artistic director the following year, Walt Disney returned to the idea of using Tchaikovsky's ballet score, feeling that Lawrence and Fain's Broadway-type songs would clash with Earle's stylized design. Schumann tried to create new arrangements for the songs that would give them a "Tchaikovsky sound", but the original song score was unusable except for "Once Upon a Dream" (which was based on the ballet's "Garland Waltz" theme). Schumann later left the project due to creative differences with Disney, and Ward Kimball recommended that George Bruns take over as composer. Sleeping Beauty was Bruns' first experience as a film composer, and his first collaboration with the Disney studio.

Working closely with animators, directors, and story artists, Bruns studied and experimented with Tchaikovsky's music for three years to make it work as a film score. The opening number, "Hail to the Princess Aurora" (sung by the royal subjects going to the castle for Aurora's christening), was based on a march in the ballet's prologue. The third strain of the "Garland Waltz" became "I Wonder", sung by Aurora as she walks through the forest with her animal friends. The suspenseful "Puss in Boots" theme from the ballet's third act was used for the scene in which Maleficent lures Aurora to the spinning wheel. Bruns made several attempts to create a song from the ballet's "Silver Fairy" theme, resulting in "Riddle, Diddle, One, Two, Three" (sung by Flora, Fauna, and Merryweather as they prepare birthday presents for Aurora). The song was eventually cut, but its melody remained in the scene. Among other, deleted songs were "Evil–Evil", which would have been sung by Maleficent and her goons, and "Go to Sleep", in which the Three Good Fairies put a sleeping spell on the castle.

Four of Bruns's songs based on the ballet score were used in the film: "Hail to the Princess Aurora", "The Gifts of Beauty and Song", "I Wonder", and "Sleeping Beauty". For "Skumps", sung by King Stefan and King Hubert as they toast their children's upcoming wedding, Bruns composed his own tune in Tchaikovsky's style because he could not find anything suitable in the ballet. The song lyrics were written by Tom Adair, Ted Sears, Erdman Penner, and Winston Hibler; most have the same placement and purpose in the plot as Fain and Lawrence's original songs. Recording of the music began in the United States, but due to a musicians' strike, Bruns was sent to a state-of-the-art studio in Berlin which allowed for a new stereo sound system for the film. Sleeping Beauty's score was the first true-stereo soundtrack. It was recorded with the Graunke Symphony Orchestra from September 8 to November 25, 1958. Tutti Camarata co-produced the recording with Bruns and supervised the sessions from the control room.

=== Soundtrack ===
In 1958, several records with music from Sleeping Beauty were released to promote the film, including Walt Disney's Story of Sleeping Beauty (an album narrated and sung by Mary Martin, with orchestra and chorus conducted by Tutti Camarata) and six Golden Records singles featuring songs performed by Darlene Gillespie (also with music conducted by Camarata). Along with additional material, Gillespie's recordings were later included on the Official Mickey Mouse Club Records album Songs from Walt Disney's Sleeping Beauty, released in 1959.

On January 5, 1959, a full album titled Walt Disney's Sleeping Beauty: Music from the Original Motion Picture Sound Track was released on LP, in both stereo and mono versions, containing the songs and a selection of instrumental music from the film. Two of the song tracks were arranged differently from the ones used in the film: "I Wonder" was longer, while "Once Upon a Dream" featured Bill Lee (instead of Bill Shirley) in a duet with Mary Costa. In 1962, Disneyland Records reissued the Official Mickey Mouse Club Records album with songs performed by Gillespie, which was replaced in 1964 by an abridged edition of the original motion picture soundtrack. In 1970, Buena Vista Records released a new stereo edition.

On October 7, 2014, the full soundtrack was released as part of The Legacy Collection from Walt Disney Records to coincide with the 55th anniversary of Sleeping Beauty; a two-CD set featured music from the film, as well as alternate versions and previously unreleased material. The edition also included four tracks that had previously appeared exclusively on the 1959 vinyl album. In 2016, the original 1959 album was reissued as a picture disc LP.

==== Songs ====
Songs performed in the film include:

No.	Title	Writer(s)	Performer(s)	Length
1.	"Hail to the Princess Aurora"	George Bruns & Tom Adair	Disney Studio Chorus
2.	"The Gifts of Beauty and Song"	George Bruns & Tom Adair	Disney Studio Chorus
3.	"I Wonder"	George Bruns, Ted Sears & Winston Hibler	Mary Costa
4.	"Once Upon a Dream"	Jack Lawrence & Sammy Fain	Mary Costa and Bill Shirley
5.	"Skumps"	George Bruns, Tom Adair & Ed Penner	Bill Thompson and Taylor Holmes
6.	"Sleeping Beauty"	George Bruns & Tom Adair	Disney Studio Chorus

== Release ==
=== Original theatrical run ===
The film's 1958 teaser trailer

Sleeping Beauty premiered at the Fox Wilshire Theater in Los Angeles on January 29, 1959, and was simultaneously released in theaters (Note: Michael Barrier, on the other hand, indicates that the film did not reach theaters until April 1959.) as a double feature with the documentary short Grand Canyon (1958). It was shown in selected theaters that were specially equipped to project the film in large-format Super Technirama 70 with six-track stereophonic sound. To promote the film, a Disneyland episode "The Peter Tchaikovsky Story" was aired on ABC on January 30, 1959. The episode was the first television show simulcast in stereo, and included a loose version of Tchaikovsky's life, Walt Disney's explanation of the Super Technirama 70 process, and clips from Sleeping Beauty.

With a production budget of $6 million, Sleeping Beauty was the most expensive Disney film at the time, and was over twice as expensive as each of the preceding three Disney animated features: Alice in Wonderland (1951), Peter Pan (1953), and Lady and the Tramp (1955). During its original release, the film grossed approximately $7.7 million in the United States and Canada, which generated $5.3 million in distributor rentals. Although Sleeping Beauty earned back its production costs, it did not recoup promotional expenses, and Buena Vista Film Distribution (Disney's distribution division) lost $900,000; as a result, the film was considered a box-office bomb. Eric Larson blamed the studio's publicity department for the film's underperformance, feeling that The Shaggy Dog (released later that year) had a far more extensive and successful advertising campaign. The production costs and box office failure of Sleeping Beauty, coupled with the underperformance of much of the studio's 1959–1960 release slate, caused Walt Disney to lose interest in animation. His company posted an annual loss of $1,300,000 for fiscal year 1960 (its first in a decade), and there were massive layoffs throughout the animation department.

=== Re-releases ===
Sleeping Beauty was first re-released theatrically in 1970 on standard 35 mm film, earning $3.8 million (equivalent to $31,503,856 in 2025). It was re-released in May 1979 in the original 70 mm format for a ten-week test engagement at Seattle's Crest Theatre before a wider release later that year in 70 and 35 mm, with stereo and mono sound. The film was re-released in March 1986, grossing $40 million in the United States and Canada (equivalent to $117,486,339 in 2025), and in the summer of 1995. With a lifetime gross in the United States and Canada of $51.6 million from all releases, Sleeping Beauty is the second-most successful film released in 1959, just behind Ben-Hur. Adjusted for ticket-price inflation, the domestic total gross is nearly $681 million, making it one of the top 40 highest-grossing films.

=== Home media ===
On October 14, 1986, Sleeping Beauty was released on VHS, Betamax, and LaserDisc as part of the Walt Disney Classics collection; over one million videocassettes were sold. The film began a moratorium on March 31, 1988. Digitally restored in 1997, it was released on VHS and LaserDisc in both fullscreen and widescreen, as part of the Walt Disney Masterpiece Collection, on September 16 of that year. To commemorate the release, Mary Costa (the voice of Princess Aurora) hosted a special theatrical screening of the film in her hometown of Knoxville, Tennessee.

Sleeping Beauty was released on VHS and in a two-disc Special Edition DVD on September 9, 2003. The DVD edition featured the 2002 restoration of the film, presented in both widescreen (formatted at 2.35:1) and fullscreen versions. It also included a making-of featurette from the 1997 VHS; the Grand Canyon short documentary film; the life-of-Tchaikovsky segment from the Disneyland episode "The Peter Tchaikovsky Story"; a 1951 story outline of the film; live-action reference clips; a virtual gallery of concept art, layout and background designs; three trailers; and audio commentary by Mary Costa, Eyvind Earle, Ollie Johnston, and others. The release ended on January 31, 2004.

On October 7, 2008, a Platinum Edition of Sleeping Beauty was released as a two-disc DVD and on Blu-ray. It was the first installment in the Platinum line released in high-definition video. This release was based on the 2007 restoration of the film from its original Technicolor negatives (interpositives, several generations removed from the original negative, were used for other home-video releases) in its full-negative aspect ratio of 2.55:1, which is wider than both prints shown at the film's original Technirama engagements (2.20:1), and the CinemaScope-compatible reduction prints for general release at 2.35:1. It included an online feature BD-Live; a new behind-the-scenes documentary Picture Perfect: The Making of Sleeping Beauty; a virtual recreation of the Sleeping Beauty Castle Walkthrough at Disneyland; an alternate opening of the film; four deleted songs; and bonus features from the previous DVD release. The set returned to the Disney Vault on January 30, 2010.

Sleeping Beauty was re-released on Diamond Edition Blu-ray and DVD and on Digital HD on October 7, 2014, including the documentary short Art of Evil: Generations Of Disney Villains (dedicated to animators and the legacy of villains in Disney features), three deleted scenes from the film, karaoke, and extras from the Platinum Blu-ray release. For its 60th anniversary, on September 24, 2019, Sleeping Beauty was re-released for HD digital download and on Blu-ray as part of the Walt Disney Signature Collection.

==== Lawsuit ====
In May 1989, Mary Costa sued the Walt Disney Company for royalties of $2 million owed to her since the 1986 home-video release of Sleeping Beauty. Costa said that her contract with the studio prevented it from producing "phonograph recordings or transcriptions for sale to the public" without her permission. The case was settled out of court by June 1991, with Costa receiving an undisclosed sum.

== Reception ==
=== Critical response ===
Sleeping Beauty initially received mixed reviews from critics, with many praising its art direction, voice acting, and musical score, but criticizing its plot and characters. Ren Grevatt from Billboard called the film a "Disney best", and complimented its score, colors, and the final battle scene, which he described as a "hair-raiser for the youngsters and grown-up alike." Variety praised the vocal work of Mary Costa and Bill Shirley, and called the scenes involving the Three Good Fairies "some of the best parts of the picture." Kate Cameron wrote for The New York Daily News that the film "will charm the young and tickle adults" and praised its story, voice acting, and character animation. George Bourke of the Miami Herald described the film as a "magnificent achievement, offering suspense, action and happy humor, in a truly giant-size package." Writing for the St. Petersburg Times, Lorna Carroll called the film a "masterpiece and the last word in the art of animation"; however, although Sleeping Beauty is "far more magnificent, far more advanced, it does not touch the heart as did Snow White." Henry Ward of The Pittsburgh Press praised the film's art direction, and said that children "undoubtedly will find the film completely enchanting", adding that a more-mature audience "may find this new effort somewhat of a carbon copy" of previous Disney animated features.

Bosley Crowther wrote for The New York Times that "the colors are rich, the sounds are luscious and magic sparkles spurt charmingly from wands", but felt that the film's plot and characters were too similar to Snow White and the Seven Dwarfs (1937). Philip K. Scheuer of the Los Angeles Times praised the film's visual design, animation quality, and the Three Good Fairies and Maleficent, but criticized its "stereotyped" human characters and found himself more impressed by the accompanying short film Grand Canyon (1958). In the Pittsburgh Post-Gazette, Harold V. Cohen praised the film's "sharp and unmistakable" art style and animation, but found the characters underdeveloped and "not exactly memorable". Harrison's Reports also noted the film's similarity to Snow White and the Seven Dwarfs (1937), saying that although Sleeping Beauty is "unquestionably superior from the viewpoint of the art of animation", it lacked the "unforgettable" characters, songs, and the overall entertainment appeal of Snow White. Time harshly criticized the film, particularly its design: "Even the drawing in Sleeping Beauty is crude: a compromise between sentimental, crayon-book childishness and the sort of cute, commercial cubism that tries to seem daring but is really just square."

When the film was re-released in 1979, Gene Siskel, on Sneak Previews, admitted that he was not a fan of it, criticizing the animation (which he found flat) and stating that the film "is not in the same league as Bambi, Pinocchio, or Dumbo"; on the other hand, Roger Ebert praised the animation, describing the film as a "lively and playful retelling a favorite fairy tale." In 1985, Dave Kehr of the Chicago Reader described Sleeping Beauty as "the masterpiece of the Disney Studios' postwar style"; he praised its use of the Super Technirama 70 process, particularly in the final battle scene. Charles Solomon wrote for the Los Angeles Times that the film "represents the culmination of Walt Disney's effort to elevate animation to an art form". Solomon praised its visual design, the character of Maleficent, and the final battle scene, but felt that the film "lacked the strong story line of the other Disney features" (particularly the "not very interesting" romance between Aurora and Phillip). Ed Gonzalez of Slant Magazine praised the film's "limber, giddy" art style, calling it "one of [Disney's] studio's most under-cherished works." A Time Out reviewer wrote that although Sleeping Beauty "rarely achieves the heights of classics like Snow White and Dumbo, it still has its moments", highlighting its "polished if sometimes stodgy" animation, soundtrack, and the final confrontation between Maleficent and Phillip.

In his book, The Disney Films, Leonard Maltin praised the film's design: "The fantastic effort and phenomenal expense do show up on the screen; it is unquestionably Disney's most elaborate cartoon film." Its animators, Frank Thomas and Ollie Johnston, said on their website that Sleeping Beauty was "dazzling in color and design but lacked warmth." On the review aggregator website Rotten Tomatoes, 90% of 50 critics' reviews are positive, with an average rating of 8.5/10. The website's consensus reads: "This Disney dreamscape contains moments of grandeur, with its lush colors, magical air, [and] one of the most menacing villains in the Disney canon." On Metacritic, the film has a weighted average score of 85 out of 100 from 12 critics, indicating "universal acclaim". Sleeping Beauty was nominated by the American Film Institute for such categories as 100 Years...100 Heroes & Villains (2003), Greatest Movie Musicals (2006), and 10 Top 10 (2008).

=== Accolades ===
Award	Category	Recipient(s)	Result	Ref.
Academy Awards	Best Scoring of a Musical Picture	George Bruns	Nominated	
Grammy Awards	Best Sound Track Album, Original Cast – Motion Picture or Television	Sleeping Beauty	Nominated	
National Film Preservation Board	National Film Registry		Inducted	
Online Film & Television Association Awards	Hall of Fame – Motion Picture		Inducted	
Satellite Awards	Outstanding Overall Blu-Ray Disc		Won	
Satellite Awards	Outstanding Youth DVD		Nominated	
Saturn Awards	Best Classic Film DVD Release		Nominated	
Young Artist Awards	Best Musical Entertainment Featuring Youth – TV or Motion Picture		Nominated	

== Legacy ==
=== Artistic influence ===
Since its original release in 1959, Sleeping Beauty has become one of the most artistically acclaimed animated films ever produced; its artistic direction, background and color styling, and character animation have been praised. It is considered one of the most influential Disney features by the animation industry, with animators such as Mike Gabriel and Michael Giaimo citing the film as inspiring them to enter the business. Sleeping Beauty's background and color styling heavily influenced the design of later animated films, such as Pocahontas (1995), Frozen (2013), Frozen II (2019), and Wish (2023). Andreas Deja, Glen Keane, and Russ Edmonds were inspired by the film's design and animation for their characters in Aladdin (1992), Pocahontas (1995), and The Hunchback of Notre Dame (1996). In 2019, Sleeping Beauty was selected for preservation in the United States' National Film Registry as "culturally, historically, or aesthetically significant".

A retrospective exhibition, Awaking Beauty: The Art of Eyvind Earle, was presented at the Walt Disney Family Museum from May 18, 2017, to January 8, 2018. With over 250 works (such as thumbnail paintings, concept artworks, and commercial illustrations), the exhibit reflected Eyvind Earle's biography and his work at the Walt Disney Studios, including his contribution to Sleeping Beauty. An exhibition catalog was published by Weldon Owen on August 8, 2017.

=== Theme park attractions ===
Originally conceived as Snow White's, Sleeping Beauty Castle at Disneyland was named to help promote the film.

In 1955, while the film was still in production, the Sleeping Beauty Castle opened at Disneyland as a symbol of the park and a promotional tool for the film. In 1957, Walt Disney and Shirley Temple opened an indoor walk-through exhibit with a series of dioramas depicting the story of Sleeping Beauty (which were designed by Eyvind Earle and Ken Anderson). The walk-through was redesigned in 1977, replacing the original hand-painted displays with three-dimensional sets and doll-like figurines. It was closed in 2001 due to declining attendance, although the September 11 attacks are also believed to be a factor. The exhibit reopened in 2008, refurbished to recreate the original 1957 dioramas. The film's characters (particularly Princess Aurora and Maleficent) make regular appearances in the parks and parades, with Maleficent as a villain in the nighttime show Fantasmic! at Disneyland and Disney's Hollywood Studios.

Opened in 1992, Le Château de la Belle au Bois Dormant at Disneyland Paris is a variant of the Sleeping Beauty Castle, with a gallery of displays illustrating the story of Sleeping Beauty in tapestries, stained-glass windows, and figurines. The building also contains an animatronic version of Maleficent's dragon form, La Tanière du Dragon (The Dragon's Den), in the lower-level dungeon. Hong Kong Disneyland opened in 2005 with the Sleeping Beauty Castle nearly replicating Disneyland's design. It was closed in 2018 and redesigned as the Castle of Magical Dreams, which opened in 2020.

=== Appearances in other media ===
DisneyToon Studios released a 2007 direct-to-video animated film, Disney Princess Enchanted Tales: Follow Your Dreams, featuring two new stories about Aurora and Jasmine from Aladdin (1992). Many of Sleeping Beauty's characters make cameo appearances in the 2001–03 television series House of Mouse, as well as in the films Who Framed Roger Rabbit (1988) and The Lion King 1½ (2004). Flora, Fauna, and Merryweather are recurring characters in the 2013–18 Disney Junior series Sofia the First, and Aurora makes a guest appearance in the "Holiday in Enchancia" episode. Aurora is also set to appear in its sequel series, Sofia the First: Royal Magic. With other Disney Princesses, Aurora appears in the 2018 film Ralph Breaks the Internet. Like other Walt Disney Animation Studios characters, Sleeping Beauty characters have cameo appearances in the short film Once Upon a Studio (2023).

A 2014 live-action adaptation of the film, Maleficent, tells the story from the perspective of the antagonist (played by Angelina Jolie). It was followed by a sequel, Maleficent: Mistress of Evil, in 2019. Live-action versions of Sleeping Beauty characters are featured in the 2011–18 fantasy television series Once Upon a Time (produced by Disney-owned ABC Studios), including Maleficent, Aurora, Prince Phillip, and King Stefan. Maleficent is a main villain in the 2015 television film Descendants, which follows the teenage children of Disney's iconic heroes and villains (including Mal, Maleficent's daughter, and Audrey, the daughter of Aurora and Phillip). A teenage version of Maleficent appears as a character in the franchise's fourth installment, Descendants: The Rise of Red (2024).

Maleficent is a recurring villain in the Square Enix/Disney video-game series Kingdom Hearts, and Aurora is one of the Princesses of Heart. The Enchanted Dominion, a world based on the film, appears in Kingdom Hearts Birth by Sleep. Aurora, Phillip, and the Three Good Fairies are playable characters in the world-builder video game Disney Magic Kingdoms, with Maleficent as the main antagonist. An alternate version of Maleficent appears as a playable character in the video game Disney Mirrorverse (2022).

In September 2026, a new original film idea inspired by Sleeping Beauty entered development, with Dan Trachtenberg signing on as director, Rayna McClendon developing the story, and Alex Anfanger and Dan Schimpf penning the script.

== See also ==
- 1959 in film
- List of American films of 1959
- List of animated feature films of the 1950s
- List of Walt Disney Pictures films
- List of Disney theatrical animated feature films
- List of Disney animated films based on fairy tales
- Medieval fantasy

== Bibliography ==
- Allan, Robin (1999). Walt Disney and Europe: European Influence on the Animated Feature Films of Walt Disney. John Libbey & Co. ISBN 978-1-8646-2041-2.
- Barrier, Michael (1999). Hollywood Cartoons: American Animation in Its Golden Age. Oxford University Press. ISBN 978-0-1980-2079-0.
- Barrier, Michael (2007). The Animated Man: A Life of Walt Disney. University of California Press. ISBN 978-0-5202-5619-4.
- Beck, Jerry (2005). The Animated Movie Guide. Chicago Review Press. ISBN 978-1-5565-2591-9.
- Bohn, James (2017). Music in Disney's Animated Features: Snow White and the Seven Dwarfs to The Jungle Book. University Press of Mississippi. ISBN 978-1-4968-1215-5.
- Burchard, Wolf (2021). Inspiring Walt Disney: The Animation of French Decorative Arts. Metropolitan Museum of Art. ISBN 978-1-5883-9741-6.
- Canemaker, John (1996). Before the Animation Begins: The Art and Lives of Disney Inspirational Sketch Artists. Hyperion Books. ISBN 978-0-7868-6152-1.
- Canemaker, John (2001). Walt Disney's Nine Old Men and the Art of Animation. Disney Editions. ISBN 978-0-7868-6496-6.
- Dakin, Glenn; Saxon, Victoria (2020). Disney Villains The Essential Guide New Edition. DK Publishing. ISBN 978-0-7440-3483-7.
- Deja, Andreas (2015). The Nine Old Men: Lessons, Techniques, and Inspiration from Disney's Great Animators. Routledge. ISBN 978-1-1350-1586-2.
- Gabler, Neal (2006). Walt Disney: The Triumph of the American Imagination. Vintage Books. ISBN 978-0-6797-5747-4.
- Ghez, Didier (2012). Walt's People: Talking Disney with the Artists who Knew Him – Volume 12. Xlibris US. ISBN 978-1-4771-4790-0.
- Ghez, Didier (2016). They Drew As they Pleased: The Hidden Art of Disney's Musical Years (The 1940s - Part One). Chronicle Books LLC. ISBN 978-1-4521-3744-5.
- Ghez, Didier (2018). They Drew As They Pleased Vol 4: The Hidden Art of Disney's Mid-Century Era (The 1950s and 1960s). Chronicle Books LLC. ISBN 978-1-4521-6413-7.
- Holt, Nathalia (2019). The Queens of Animation: The Untold Story of the Women Who Transformed the World of Disney and Made Cinematic History. Little, Brown. ISBN 978-0-3164-3916-9.
- Koenig, David (1997). Mouse Under Glass: Secrets of Disney Animation & Theme Parks. Bonaventure Press. ISBN 978-0-9640-6051-7.
- Maltin, Leonard (1987). Of Mice and Magic: A History of American Animated Cartoons. Plume. ISBN 978-0-4522-5993-5.
- Maltin, Leonard (1995). The Disney Films. Disney Editions. ISBN 978-0-7868-8527-5.
- Singer, A.L. (1993). Walt Disney's Sleeping Beauty. Disney Press. ISBN 978-1-5628-2366-5.
- Smith, Dave (2012). Disney Trivia from the Vault: Secrets Revealed and Questions Answered. Disney Editions. ISBN 978-1-4231-7857-6.
- Solomon, Charles (1995). The Disney That Never Was: The Stories and Art from Five Decades of Unproduced Animation. Disney Editions. ISBN 978-0-7868-6037-1.
- Solomon, Charles (2014). Once Upon a Dream: From Perrault's Sleeping Beauty to Disney's Maleficent. Disney Editions. ISBN 978-1-4231-9902-1.
- Solomon, Charles (2020). The Disney Princess: A Celebration of Art and Creativity. Chronicle Books. ISBN 978-1-4521-5911-9.
- Szasz, Ioan (2017). Awaking Beauty: The Art of Eyvind Earle. Weldon Owen. ISBN 978-1-6818-8271-0.
- Takamoto, Iwao; Mallory, Michael (2009). Iwao Takamoto: My Life with a Thousand Characters. University Press of Mississippi. ISBN 978-1-6047-3193-4.
- Thomas, Bob (1958). Walt Disney, the Art of Animation. Simon & Schuster.
- Thomas, Bob (1994). Walt Disney: An American Original. Hyperion Press. ISBN 0-7868-6027-8.
- Thomas, Bob (1997). Disney's Art of Animation: From Mickey Mouse To Hercules. Disney Editions. ISBN 978-0-7868-6241-2.
- Thomas, Frank; Johnston, Ollie (1981). Disney Animation: The Illusion of Life. Abbeville Press. ISBN 978-0-7868-6070-8.
- Thomas, Frank; Johnston, Ollie (1993). The Disney Villain. Disney Editions. ISBN 978-1-5628-2792-2.
- Tibbetts, John C. (2008). Composers in the Movies: Studies in Musical Biography. Yale University Press. ISBN 978-0-3001-2803-1.
- Webb, Graham (2011). The Animated Film Encyclopedia: A Complete Guide to American Shorts, Features and Sequences, 1900-1999. McFarland & Company. ISBN 978-0-7864-4985-9.
- Williams, Pat; Denney, James (2004). How to Be Like Walt: Capturing the Disney Magic Every Day of Your Life. Health Communications Inc. ISBN 978-0-7573-0231-2.
- Zemler, Emily (2022). Disney Princess: Beyond the Tiara. Epic Ink. ISBN 978-0-7603-7363-7.
