= Van Dyke =

Van Dyke, VanDyke or Vandyke is an Americanized or anglicized form of the Dutch-language toponymic surname Van Dijk, Van Dijke, Van Dijck, or Van Dyck. Meaning living near the dike. literal translation being "from/of [the] dike"

Van Dyke, VanDyke or Vandyke may refer to:

== As a surname ==
- The Van Dyke family of American entertainers:

- Dick Van Dyke (born 1925), actor
  - Barry Van Dyke (born 1951), actor
    - Shane Van Dyke (born 1979), actor, screenwriter, and director
- Jerry Van Dyke (1931–2018), comedian and actor, brother of Dick
  - Kelly Jean Van Dyke (1958–1991), actress and adult film performer

- Aldo Calderón van Dyke (1968–2013), Honduran journalist and news anchor
- Alex Van Dyke (born 1974), American football wide receiver
- Anthony E. Van Dyke, United States Marine Corps colonel
- Antony van Dyke, variant English spelling of the Flemish-born painter Anthony van Dyck, (1599–1641)
- Arlington P. Van Dyke (1926–1990), American businessman and New York politician
- Ben Van Dyke (1888–1973), American baseball pitcher
- Bill Van Dyke (1863–1933), American baseball player
- Bruce Van Dyke (born 1944), American football guard
- Carl Van Dyke (1881–1919), American soldier, lawyer and politician from Minnesota
- Charie Van Dyke (born 1965), American film producer
- Charlie Van Dyke (born 1947), American former radio disc jockey
- Christina Van Dyke, American philosopher
- Conny Van Dyke (1945–2023), American singer and actress
- David Van Dyke (born 1959), American serial killer
- DeMarcus Van Dyke (born 1989), American football cornerback
- Dick van Dyke (politician) (fl. 1985), American (Washington State) politician
- Earl Van Dyke (1930–1992), American soul musician, keyboardist for Motown Records
- Edwin Van Dyke (1849–1952), American physician and entomologist
- Harry Van Dyke (born 1972), American actor and music producer
- Henry van Dyke (1852–1933), American author, educator, and clergyman
- Hilary Van Dyke (born 1970), American actress and singer
- Inger Vandyke, Australian wildlife photojournalist, explorer and expedition leader
- James A. Van Dyke (1813–1855), American lawyer, mayor of Detroit in 1847
- Jan Van Dyke (1941–2015), American dancer and choreographer
- John van Dyke (canoeist) (born 1935), American sprint canoer
- John Van Dyke (politician) (1807–1878), American jurist and Whig Party politician
- John Charles Van Dyke (1856–1932), American art historian and critic
- John Wesley Van Dyke (1849–1939), American oil refiner
- Joost van Dyke (died c.1631), Dutch privateer in the West Indies
- Lawrence VanDyke (born 1972), American judge
- Leroy Van Dyke (born 1929), American singer
- Les Vandyke (1931–2021), English pop singer and songwriter
- Louis van Dyke, international spelling of Louis van Dijk (1941–2020), Dutch pianist
- Marcia Van Dyke (1922–2002), American violinist and actress, niece of W.S. Van Dyke
- Matthew VanDyke (born 1979), American documentary filmmaker and Prisoner of War in the Libyan civil war
- Milton Van Dyke (1922–2010), American aerospace engineer and aerodynamicist
- Nicholas Van Dyke (governor) (1738–1789), American lawyer and President of Delaware
- Nicholas Van Dyke (senator) (1770–1826), American lawyer and Senator from Delaware
- Paul Van Dyke (1859–1933), American historian, brother of Henry Van Dyke
- Phillip Van Dyke (born 1984), American voice actor
- Ria van Dyke (born 1989), New Zealand model and beauty pageant
- Ronny van Dyke (born 1956), German singer and songwriter
- Russ Van Dyke (1917–1992), radio and television newsman in Iowa
- Ryan Van Dyke (born 1980), American football player
- Tyler Van Dyke (born 2001), American football player
- Vonda Kay Van Dyke (born 1943), American model, 1965 Miss America
- W. S. Van Dyke (1889–1943), American film director
- Walter Van Dyke (1823–1905), American justice of the California Supreme Court
- Willard Van Dyke (1906–1986), American filmmaker, photographer, and Museum of Modern Art director

== As a derived given or middle name ==
- Van Dyke Brooke, stage name of Stewart McKerrow (1859–1921), American actor, screenwriter and film director
- Van Dyke Parks (born 1943), American musician and actor
- Walter Van Dyke Bingham (1880–1952), American applied and industrial psychologist
- Henry Vandyke Carter (1831–1897), English anatomist, surgeon, and anatomical artist
- Anthony Vandyke Copley Fielding (1787–1855), English painter
- Henry Van Dyke Johns (1803–1859), American Episcopal clergyman, Chaplain of the Senate
- Samuel Van Dyke Stout (1786–1850), American (Tennessee) Whig politician

== Places ==
- Jost Van Dyke, island of the British Virgin Islands named after Joost van Dyk
- M-53 (Michigan highway), highway in the U.S. state of Michigan known as Van Dyke Avenue and Van Dyke Road in Metro Detroit
- Van Dyke, Michigan, former community in the United States
- Vandyke, Texas, unincorporated community in Comanche County
- Vandyke, Virginia, unincorporated community named after the postmaster Henry Vandyke
- Van Dyke Public Schools, Michigan school district
- Vandyke Upper School, School in Bedfordshire, England

== Others ==
- Van Dyke beard, 19th century name for a style of beard, as worn by the painter and his subjects
- Van Dyke brown, colour, named after the painter Anthony van Dyck
- Van Dyke brown (printing), printing process named after Anthony van Dyck
- Van Dyke mango, a named mango cultivar that originated in south Florida
- Van Dyke Records, American record label from about early 1929 through 1932
- Vandyke (video game), 1991 video game
- Vandyke Productions, British film production company between 1947 and 1956

== See also ==
- The Van Dykes, a group of traveling lesbian separatists from the late 1970s
- Dyke (surname)
- van (Dutch)
- Van Dijk
- Van Dyck (surname)
- Van Dyk
