= Van Dyck (surname) =

Van Dyck or Vandyck is a Dutch toponymic surname meaning "from (the) dike", originally written Van Dijck. Notable people with the surname include:

- Abraham van Dyck (1635–1680), Dutch painter (preferred spelling "van Dijck")
- Albert Van Dyck (1902–1951), Belgian painter
- Anthony van Dyck (1599–1641), Flemish artist, court painter in England
- Christopher H. van Dyck (born 1955), American neuroscientist
- Cornelius Van Alen Van Dyck (1819–1895), American missionary
- Edouard Van Dyck (1918–1977), Belgian professional road bicycle racer
- Elisabeth Van Dyck (1951–1979), German member of the Red Army Faction
- Ernest van Dyck (1861–1923), Belgian dramatic tenor
- Floris van Dyck (1575–1651), Dutch painter
- Henry H. Van Dyck (1809–1888), New York politician
- Jeff van Dyck (born 1969), Australian video game music composer
- Marijuana Pepsi Vandyck, American educator
- Max Van Dyck (1902–1992), Belgian painter
- Steve Van Dyck, Australian zoologist and museum curator
- Vedder Van Dyck (1889–1960), American Episcopal bishop
- William Vandyck, British actor and children's author
- William V. B. Van Dyck (1875–1981), American football player, electrical engineer, and businessman

== See also ==
- Van Dijck
- Van Dijk
- Van Dyk
- Van Dyke (disambiguation)
- Walther von Dyck (1856–1934), German mathematician
- Dick Van Dyke, American actor and comedian
- Anthony Van Dyck (horse) (2016–2020), Irish thoroughbred race horse
