= Dyk (surname) =

Dyk (Czech feminine: Dyková) is a surname appearing in several languages. In Czech, the surname is transcription of Dick, which was a pet form of the German given name Benedikt. Notable people with the surname include:

- Ian Dyk (born 1985), Australian race driver
- Robert Dyk (1937–2008), American journalist
- Ruth Dyk (1901–2000), American suffragist, psychologist and author
- Sebastian Dyk (born 1992), Swedish ice hockey player
- Tatiana Dyková (born 1978), Czech actress
- Timothy B. Dyk (born 1937), American judge
- Viktor Dyk (1877–1931), Czech poet, writer and politician
- Vojtěch Dyk (born 1985), Czech actor and singer

== See also ==
- DYK (disambiguation)
- Van Dyk
