= Charles Solomon (animation historian) =

American animation historian, author, and film critic

- Born: United States
- Education: University of California Los Angeles
- Occupations: Film critic, animation historian, writer, author

Charles Solomon is an American animation historian, author, and film critic who has written multiple books about Disney animation and other animated works.

== Education ==
Solomon attended University of California Los Angeles for his bachelor's and master's degrees in European cultural history.

== Accolades ==
Enchanted Drawings, Solomon's 1989 book on the history of American animation, was named a New York Times Notable Book of the Year and was also nominated for a National Book Critics’ Circle Award (a first for a film book).

== Film criticism ==
Solomon has written about the subject for NPR, Variety, Rolling Stone and The New York Times.

Solomon, writing for the Los Angeles Times in 1986, listed his picks for the best animated films of the 1980s:

- Crac (Frederic Back, 1981)
- Son of the White Mare (Marcell Jankovics, 1981)
- The Adventures of Mark Twain (Will Vinton, 1985)
- Anna & Bella (Borge Ring, 1985)
- The Big Snit (Richard Condie, 1985)
- The Great Mouse Detective (Burny Mattinson/John Musker/Ron Clements, 1986)

== Selected bibliography ==
- Enchanted Drawings (1989)
- The Disney That Never Was (1995)
- The Prince of Egypt: A New Vision in Animation (1998)
- The Art of Toy Story 3 (2010)
- The Art of Making Peanuts Animation (2012)
- The Art of Frozen (2013)
- The Art of the Disney Golden Books (2014)
- Tale as Old as Time (2017)
- Walt Disney's Nine Old Men (2018)
- The Disney Princess: A Celebration of Art & Creativity (2020)
- The Art of Wolfwalkers (2020)
- The Art of Mamoru Hosoda: The Man Who Leapt Through Film (2023)
- Animation for the People: An Illustrated History of the National Film Board of Canada (2025)
- The Art of Cartoon Saloon: 25 Years (2026)
