= Cilia van Dijk =

Dutch film producer (1941–2023)

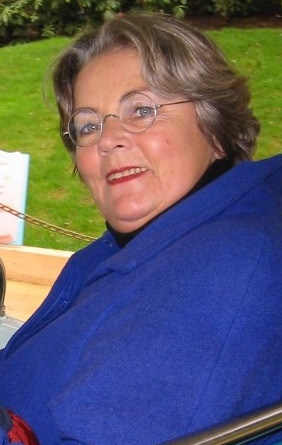
- van Dijk in 2012
- Born: Cilia van Lieshout; 22 November 1941; Uden, German-occupied Netherlands
- Died: 26 April 2023 (aged 81)
- Occupation: Film producer
- Awards: Academy Award for Best Animated Short Film

Cilia van Dijk Lieshout (22 November 1941 – 26 April 2023) was a Dutch film producer. Her film work includes DaDa, Frieze Frame, I Move, so I Am, The Last Words of Dutch Schultz and Anna & Bella. Anna & Bella earned her an Academy Award for Best Animated Short Film as producer.

== Life and career ==
In 1963, Van Dijk-Lieshout married Gerrit van Dijk, a Dutch animator.

In 1978 she created Animated People, a distributor of Dutch animation films.

Van Dijk died on 26 April 2023, at the age of 81.

== Filmography ==
- 1979: Jute
- 1983: Haast een hand
- 1983: A Good Turn Daily
- 1984: Anna & Bella (producer)
- 1986: Animation Has No Borders
- 1988: Pas à deux
- 1991: Frieze Frame
- 1995: De houten haarlemmers
- 1997: DaDa
- 1998: Ik beweeg, dus ik besta
- 1999: Applause
- 2001: Radio Umanak
- 2002: Stiltwalkers

== See also ==
- Børge Ring
- Cinema of the Netherlands

== External sources ==
- Cilia van Dijk at IMDb
- gerritvandijk.nl
- MUBI
