= Erdman Penner =

Canadian screenwriter and producer (1905–1956)

Erdman Penner (January 17, 1905 – November 10, 1956) was a Canadian screenwriter and producer, known for his work with Walt Disney, including writing the screenplays for Cinderella, Sleeping Beauty, Lady and the Tramp among others.

== Life and career ==
Penner was born into a Mennonite family in Rosthern, Saskatchewan, in 1905 to Dr. Erdman Penner (1873–1960) and Blanche Penner (1880–1962). Penner studied at the University of Saskatchewan, American Academy of Art in Chicago and the American School for Writers in Hollywood. He was hired by Walt Disney Productions in 1935, where he wrote and adapted stories for Pinocchio, Fantasia, Cinderella, Alice in Wonderland and others. He also wrote song lyrics for Peter Pan and was an associate producer on Lady and the Tramp. He also played bass saxophone and tuba for the Firehouse Five Plus Two. He died on November 10, 1956, in Los Angeles, California, US.
