= Did You Know People Can Fly? =

Studio album by Kaddisfly
- Released: December 12, 2003
- Genre: Progressive rock
- Length: 40:58
- Label: Self-released

Kaddisfly chronology
Humania EP (2002)	Did You Know People Can Fly? (2003)	Buy Our Intention; We'll Buy You a Unicorn (2005)

Did You Know People Can Fly? is the first full-length album by Kaddisfly. It was released in 2003 under a self-titled independent record label. In interviews about the album, the group's musicians commented that they were trying to a new style to stay fresh and differentiate themselves from their prior works.

== Production ==
The album was self-released on December 12, 2003. Aaron Tollefson, who played guitar on the album, commented about the writing of the music, "when it came to writing this record, we wanted to wipe away everything people knew of us and resurface with a composition that couldn't be boxed, labeled, or formulaically packaged." Beau Kuther, a fellow member of the group who played drums on the album, observed, "We wanted to really challenge ourselves and write a record where every noise, texture, and color fit into the composition on a whole." Kile Brewer, who played bass, emphasized the importance of the group's music staying original, "We are all of the same mind that if we are going to exist in this business for life, we will have to perpetually challenge ourselves, take risks, and never create the same record twice. The moment you grow static is the moment your music needs eyes." Christopher Ruff, who sang and played piano, later talked about how the album was done "entirely in a studio out in L.A., it felt a lot staler, it didn’t feel like there was as much depth or as much of an overall vibe to the album. We thought we were able to catch more of a vibe back in Oregon and doing it there."

== Track listing ==
All music is composed by Kaddisfly.

No.	Title	Length
1.	"Wounds From A Friend Can Be Trusted"	1:17
2.	"Enemies Multiply Kisses"	5:20
3.	"Midnight in Shanghai"	5:26
4.	"Unto Dark Hours, A Time Machine"	3:36
5.	"Vacation On An Invisible Plane"	4:00
6.	"Manhattan Loves You"	5:05
7.	"Unabridged; En Masse"	2:55
8.	"Day Disappears With The Absence of Night"	13:15
Total length:		40:58

== Personnel ==
- Christopher Ruff – vocals, piano
- Aaron Tollefson – guitars
- Beau Kuther – drums, percussion
- Kile Brewer – bass, vocals

== See also ==
- Alternative rock
- Caddisfly
- Experimental rock
- Four Seasons EP
- Set Sail the Prairie
- Timeline of progressive rock
