= Set Sail the Prairie =

Studio album by Kaddisfly
- Released: March 6, 2007
- Genre: Progressive rock
- Length: 73:00
- Label: Sub City
- Producer: Kris Crummett

Kaddisfly chronology
Buy Our Intention; We'll Buy You a Unicorn (2005)	Set Sail the Prairie (2007)	Horses Galloping on Sailboats (2015)

Professional ratings
Review scores
Source	Rating
AbsolutePunk	(83/100)
AllMusic	2/5 stars
Drowned in Sound	6/10 stars
NeuFutur	7/10 stars
Sonic Frontiers	7/10 stars

Set Sail the Prairie is the name of Kaddisfly's third full-length album, released on March 6, 2007. The album has fourteen tracks. Each song represents both a month of the year and a specific location in the northern hemisphere. There are also two extra tracks for the summer and winter solstices. An unfinished version was leaked in June 2006, 9 months prior the release date.

== Track listing ==
1. "Summer Solstice" – 1:32
2. "Campfire (Junio)" – 4:43
3. "Waves (July)" – 4:37
4. "Harbor (Agosto)" – 4:35
5. "Birds (Septembre)" – 6:03
6. "Clouds (Heshvan)" – 3:41
7. "Empire (Noyabr')" – 4:25
8. "Winter Solstice" – 1:20
9. "Snowflakes (Desember)" – 7:48
10. "Via Rail (Janvier)" – 5:23
11. "Silk Road (Pharvarì)" – 5:27
12. "Mercury (Sān Yuè)" – 5:07
13. "Clockwork (Sì Yuè)" – 3:46
14. "Forest (Maй)" – 11:13

== Charts ==
Chart (2007)	Peak position
U.S. Top Heatseekers	34
