= Van Dijck =

Van Dijck is a Dutch toponymic surname meaning "from (the) dike". The more common form Van Dijk uses the modern spelling of "dike". The form Van Dyck reflects a common replacement of the original IJ digraph with a Y.

== Notable people with the surname ==
- Abraham van Dijck (1635–1680), Dutch Golden Age painter
- Antoon van Dijck (1599–1641), Flemish painter in England, better known as Anthony van Dyck
- Christoffel van Dijck (1605–1669), Dutch printer and type designer
- Edward Van Dijck (1918–1977), Belgian cyclist
- Erica van Dijck (born 1966), Dutch badminton player
- Floris van Dijck (1575–1651), Dutch painter
- Hendrik Van Dijck (born 1974), Belgian cyclist
- José van Dijck (born 1960), Dutch professor
- Kris Van Dijck (born 1963), Belgian politician
- Raymond Van Dijck (1935–1997), Belgian pole vaulter
- Sander van Dijck (born 1990), Dutch music producer, known more commonly as San Holo.
- Teun van Dijck (born 1963), Dutch politician
- William Van Dijck (born 1961), Belgian long-distance runner

== See also ==
- Van Dijk
- Van Dyck (surname)
- 8205 Van Dijck, main-belt asteroid
