= Anna & Bella =

- Directed by: Børge Ring
- Produced by: Cilia van Dijk
- Starring: Tonny Huurdeman; Annemieke Ring; Peter Ring
- Edited by: Hans Perk
- Release date: November 10, 1984
- Running time: 8 minutes
- Country: Netherlands
- Language: No dialogue

Anna & Bella is a 1984 independent Dutch animated short film from the Netherlands. At the 58th Academy Awards, Anna & Bella won an Oscar for Best Animated Short Film. The film runs 8 minutes. It was directed by Børge Ring, and its cast includes Tonny Huurdeman as the voices of Anna and of Bella.

== Plot ==
The short film starts with the two elderly sisters finds a photo book while drinking a wine with Mom & Dad pictures while through flipping on it and the flashback of about two little sisters looking through their memories of their lives together.

== Reception and legacy ==
Animation critic Charles Solomon listed it as one of the best animated films of the 1980s a year after the Oscar win.

== See also ==
- 1984 in film
- Cinema of the Netherlands
- 1985 in film

== Bibliography ==
- Olivier Cotte, 2007, Secrets of Oscar-winning animation: Behind the scenes of 13 classic short animations (Making of Anna & Bella), Focal Press. ISBN 978-0-240-52070-4.
