= Kaddisfly =

American alternative rock band

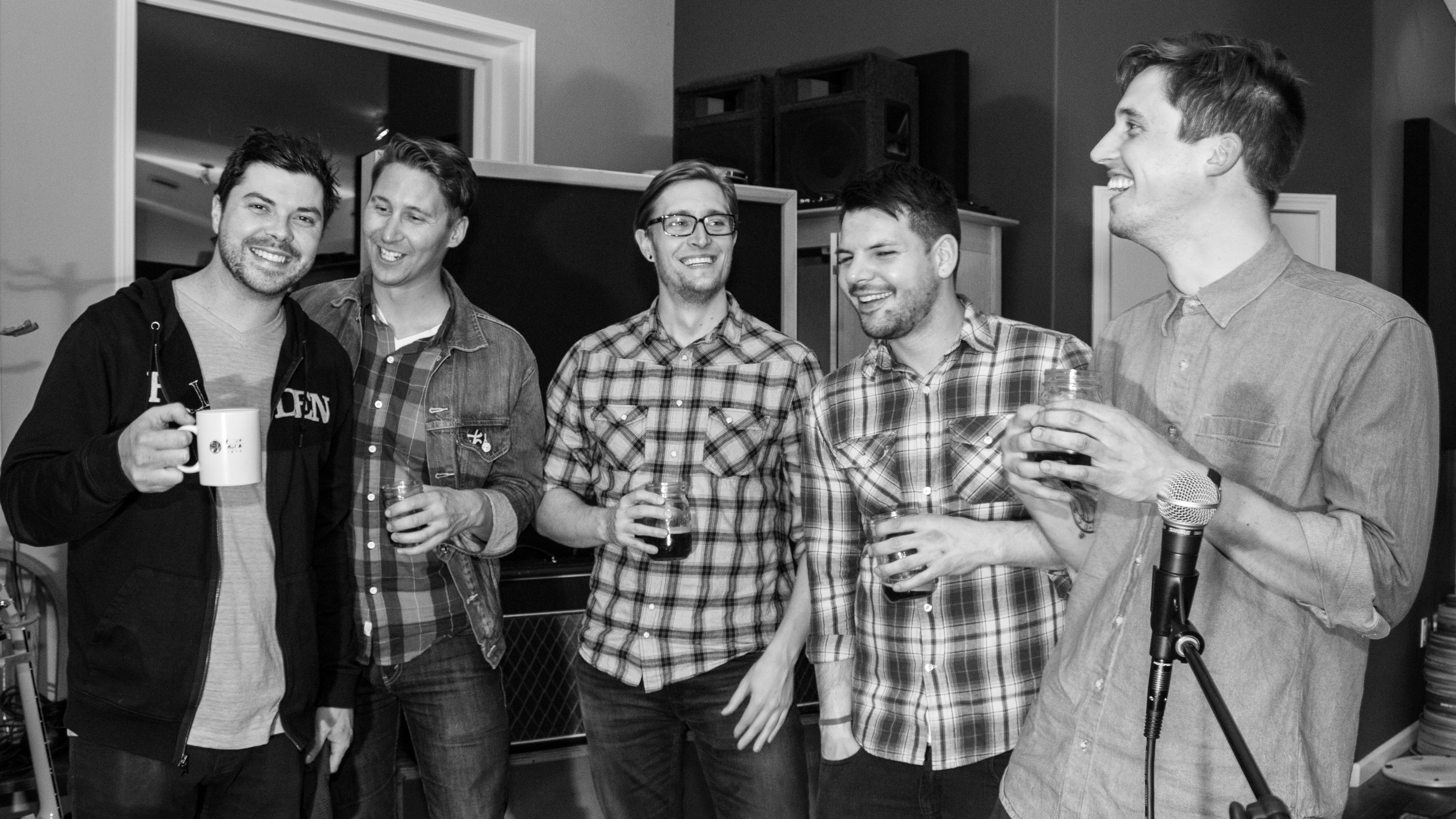

Background information
- Origin: Eugene, Oregon, U.S.
- Genres: Experimental rock, alternative rock
- Years active: 2001–2008, 2014–present
- Labels: Hopeless Records intheclouds Records; Crimson Solitude Records
- Members: Christopher Ruff; Aaron Tollefson; Beau Kuther; Kelsey Kuther; Kile Brewer
- Website: youaretheend.com

Kaddisfly is an American rock band based in Portland, Oregon, formed in 2001. The band was signed to Hopeless Records\Sub City Records from 2005 to 2008 and issued three releases on the label family. The group took a hiatus from 2008 to 2013, and after reuniting released music under the label intheclouds Records.

== History ==
=== Formation and first two albums (2001-2008) ===
The band formed in 2001 by former students at Winston Churchill High School and Mountain View High School in Eugene Oregon, the same place where Rock N Roll Soldiers and Tracy Bonham have started their music career, taking their name from a small insect, the caddisfly. After several independent releases, the band signed to Hopeless Records in 2004 and released Buy Our Intention; We'll Buy You a Unicorn through the label on March 8, 2005. Exclaim! likened the band's sound to that of The Juliana Theory, calling the album "the perfect blend of thrash, mainstream rock, and textured prog all wrapped up in post-punk emo."

Kaddisfly made multiple nationwide tours between 2003 and 2008. They performed on the 2007 Take Action Tour with Red Jumpsuit Apparatus, Emery, Scary Kids Scaring Kids, and A Static Lullaby. They also performed on the Smart Punk Stage as part of the 2007 Vans Warped Tour.

An EP, Four Seasons, was released in 2006, and a second album, Set Sail the Prairie, was issued in 2007, both on Hopeless sublabel Sub City Records. Allmusic described Set Sail the Prairie as "big, rich, and texturally varied", but with "disjointed and haphazard" song structures. Drowned in Sound had a similarly mixed response to the album, noting, "Maybe the most irritating thing about this release is the potential constantly in sight just over the horizon, but never reached." Absolute Punk described it as "clever and a lot more organized" than the band's previous full-length.

In July 2008 bassist Kile Brewer decided to leave the band.

=== Hiatus (2008–2014) ===
The group announced a hiatus in December 2008. Kaddisfly posted a statement to their official Myspace page on Thursday, December 18, 2008, stating:

...Kile Brewer has left Kaddisfly. His departure came late in the summer and was not all that unexpected. Kile moved to Denver with his wife and wanted to start a new chapter in his life. We are still very close to Kile and we wish him the best in all his future endeavors.
As Kaddisfly we may very well end up finishing horses galloping one day, but for now, I suppose the popular thing to say would be we are on a small hiatus. There will always be our back catalog, and our internet presence will remain the same because Kaddisfly isn't dead, just hibernating. We also still have some unreleased material that may surface at some point.

In the fall of 2008, Christopher Ruff, Beau Kuther, Kelsey Kuther, and Aaron Tollefson started a new band called Water & Bodies. Water & Bodies released their debut EP on May 15, 2009. In the summer of 2010, Kelsey Kuther left the band. He was subsequently replaced by Kile Brewer after he moved back to Portland, Oregon. Water & Bodies released their first full-length album 'Light Year' in February 2011.

=== Reunion & Horses Galloping On Sailboats (2014-present) ===
On March 5, 2014, Kaddisfly updated their Facebook page with an image of a setlist and possible tracklisting. A later posting announced a small show, the band's first in over 5 years, that was held in Portland, Oregon on March 10, 2014.

On January 5, 2015, they updated their Facebook page with a tracklisting for the upcoming 2015 release of Horses Galloping on Sailboats. It contained 12 tracks.

In June 2015, they announced they had signed with intheclouds Records and would be releasing Horses Galloping on Sailboats on June 21, 2015. A tracklisting was released as well as the cover art and news of a limited edition vinyl edition of the album. The band also registered a new website located at www.youaretheend.com.

In 2025, Crimson Solitude Records partnered with Kaddisfly to reissue their early material to streaming services as well as new EPs entitled It Has to Be This Way and Hourglass, featuring studio demos from 2007 and 2008.

== Band members ==
- Christopher Ruff – vocals/piano
- Aaron Tollefson – guitar
- Beau Kuther – drums/percussion
- Kelsey Kuther – guitar/percussion
- Kile Brewer – bass/vocals

== Discography ==
=== Albums ===
- Did You Know People Can Fly? (2003)
- Buy Our Intention; We'll Buy You a Unicorn (Hopeless, 2005)
- Set Sail the Prairie (Sub City, 2007) U.S. Billboard Heatseekers #34
- Horses Galloping on Sailboats (Intheclouds, 2015)

=== EPs ===
- Honorable Mention EP (2001)
- Promotional Demo (2002)
- Humania EP (2002)
- Four Seasons EP (2006)
- It Has to Be This Way (2025)
- Hourglass (2025)

=== Compilation appearances ===
- "Lower Case Letter" on Under the Radar: MP3.com 2003 (2003, MP3.com)
- "Midnight in Shanghai" on Take Action! Volume 04 (2004, Sub City)
- "La Primera Natural Disaster" on Summer Sampler 2005 (2005, Hopeless)
- "A Message to the Flat Earth Society" on Who Said All Punk Sounds the Same? v.2 (2005, Hopeless/Sub City
- "Campfire" on Who Said All Punk Sounds The Same? v.3 (2006, Hopeless/Sub City)
- "For the Ejection of Rest; They'll Dance" on Hopelessly Devoted to You Vol. 6 (2006, Hopeless/Sub City)
- "Akira" on Rock Sound Volume 112 (2006, Rock Sound)
- "Campfire" on Take Action! Volume 6 (2007, Hopeless/Sub City)
- "Empire" on Change! (2007, Hopeless/Sub City)
- "Campfire" on Rock Sound Volume 118 (2007, Rock Sound)
- "Empire" on Take Action! 2007 Tour Sampler (2007, Hopeless/Sub City)
- "Campfire" on Rock One Vol. 30 (2007, Rock One)
- "Campfire" on Another Hopeless Summer (2007, Hopeless)
- "Campfire" on Easter Aggro 2 (2007, Big Cheese)
