= Dyke (automobile company) =

Defunct American motor vehicle manufacturer

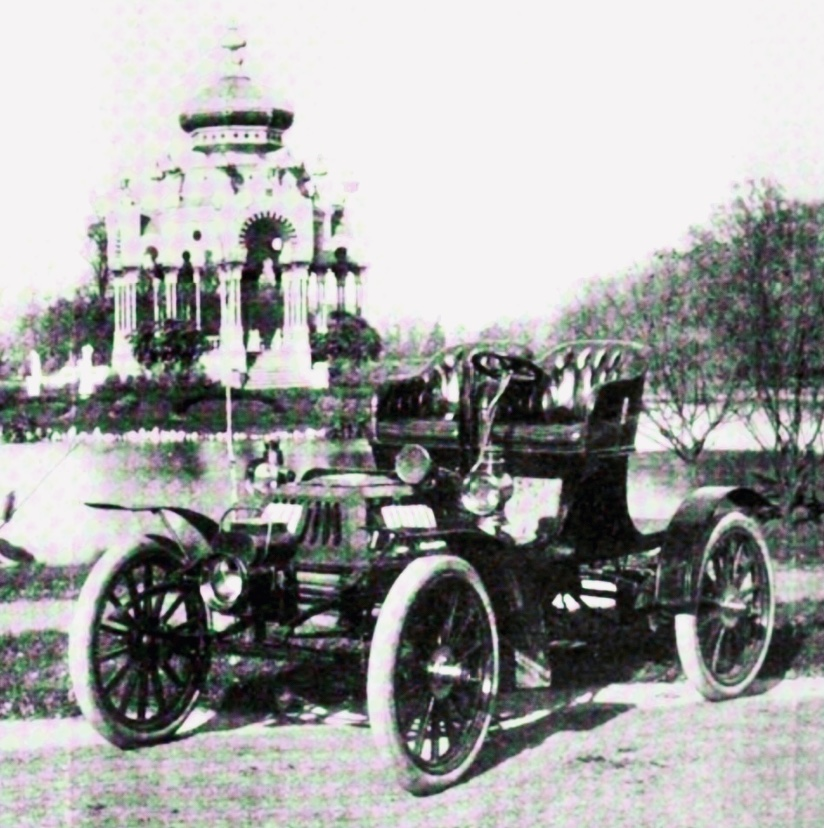
A.L. Dyke No. 1 Car (1902)

Dyke Runabout Model 0 (1901)

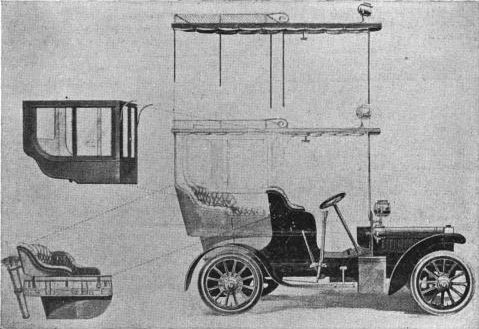
1904 Dyke-Britton 20 hp Combination Car

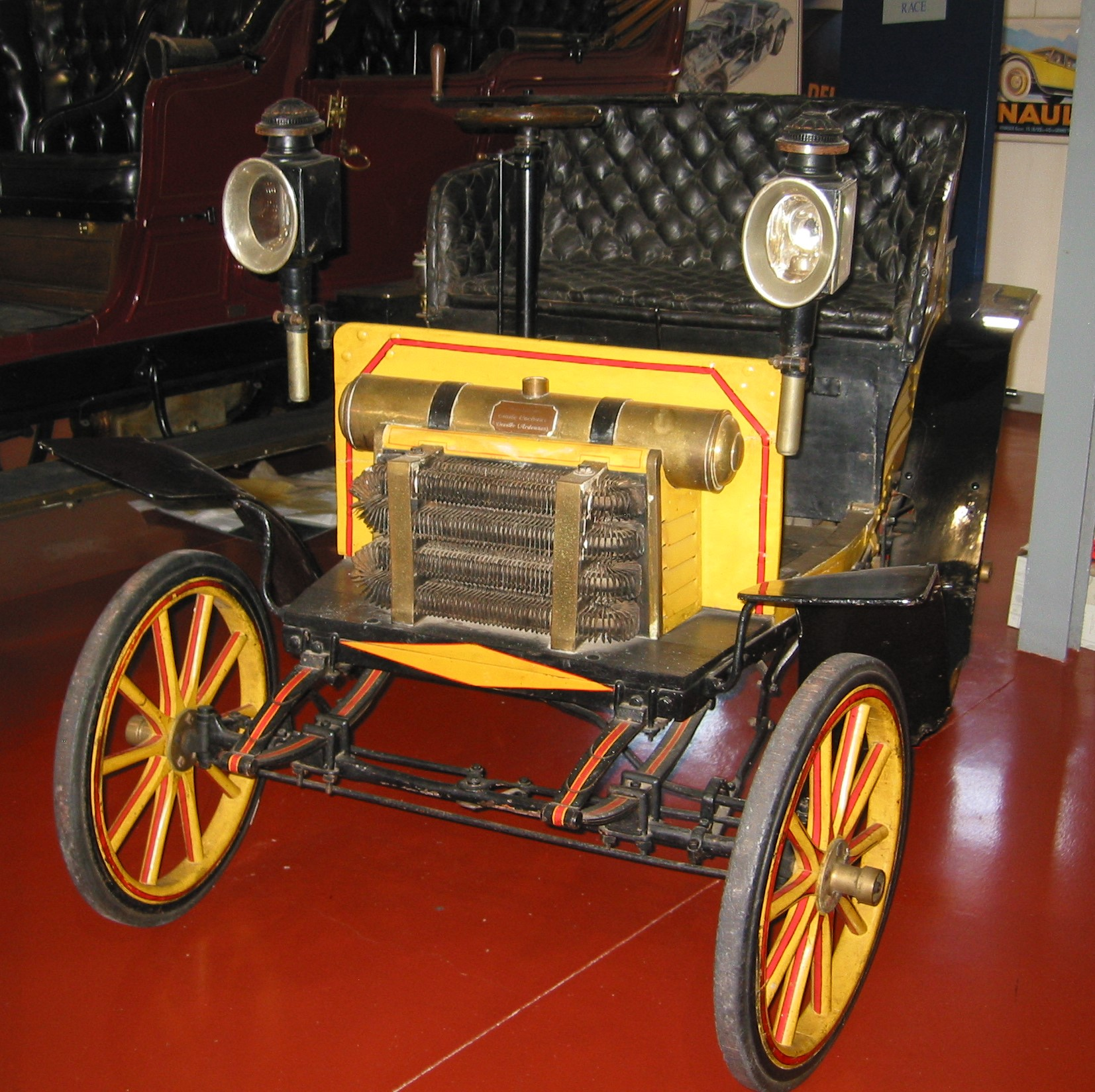
Dyke 5 HP (1901)

Dyke was the first American auto parts business, established in St. Louis, Missouri, in 1899 by A.L. Dyke (Andrew Lee Dyke). Dyke also sold early autos, kit car or assembled. In addition to the Dyke name, the company also sold automobiles under the St. Louis and Dyke-Britton names.
