= Buy Our Intention; We'll Buy You a Unicorn =

Studio album by Kaddisfly
- Released: March 8, 2005
- Recorded: 2004
- Studio: Sage & Sound Studio, Hollywood, CA; The Space, Van Nuys, CA
- Length: 65:32
- Label: Hopeless
- Producer: Enoch Jensen

Kaddisfly chronology
Did You Know People Can Fly? (2003)	Buy Our Intention; We'll Buy You a Unicorn (2005)	Four Seasons EP (2006)

Professional ratings
Review scores
Source	Rating
AllMusic	3.5/5 stars

Buy Our Intention; We'll Buy You a Unicorn is the second full-length album released by Kaddisfly. It is also the title of the album's thirteenth track.

== Track listing ==
Christopher James Ruff

1. "La Primera Natural Disaster" – 3:16
2. "A Message to the Flat Earth Society" – 3:39
3. "The Calm of Calamity" – 4:58
4. "Crimson Solitude" – 4:35
5. "Eres Tremulent" – 4:52
6. "New Moon Over Swift Water" – 3:21
7. "Let Weight Be Measured by Merit" – 3:02
8. "Akira." – 2:22
9. "For the Ejection of Rest; They'll Dance" – 3:30
10. "Osmosis in C" – 4:18
11. "What Comes of Honesty" – 2:12
12. "Five Tears from a Carpenter's Eye for Detail" – 6:04
13. "Buy Our Intention; We'll Buy You a Unicorn" – 5:45
14. "Set Sail the Prairie" – 5:13
15. "Horses Galloping on Sail Boats" – 10:25

== Personnel ==
- Aaron William Tollefson - Guitar, Mandolin
- Christopher James Ruff - Vocals, Lyrics, Piano, Art Layout
- Kile Michael Brewer - Bass
- Beau Justin Kuther - Drums, Percussion
- Kelsey Beck Kuther - Guitar, Slide, Percussion
- Ryan Case - Artwork
- Enoch Jensen - Production, Engineering
- Alan Douches - Mastering
