= DYK =

DYK or Dyk may refer to:

- List of acronyms: D#DY, an acronym of 'did you know?'
- Dyk (surname), a Czech surname
  - Van Dyk, an Afrikaans surname
- Dongfeng Yueda Kia, an automotive manufacturing venture; 2002–2022
- Underwater Demolition Command, a Greek naval unit (Greek: Διοίκηση Υποβρυχίων Καταστροφών; so named since 2001)
- Devil You Know (band), an American metalcore group; 2012–2017
