= Dykes, Camera, Action! =

- Directed by: Caroline Berler
- Produced by: Caroline Berler
- Starring: Desiree Akhavan; Cheryl Dunye; Su Friedrich; Jenni Olson; B. Ruby Rich; Yoruba Richen; Sarah Schulman
- Cinematography: Brian Inocencio; Melanie McLean Brooks
- Music by: Gil Talmi
- Distributed by: Frameline Distribution
- Release date: June 18, 2018 (Frameline Film Festival)
- Running time: 61 minutes
- Language: English

Dykes, Camera, Action! is a 2018 American documentary film about the history of lesbian and queer cinema from the women who made it happen. The documentary is the first feature-length film of New York City based director and editor, Caroline Berler.

== Synopsis ==
The film is the exploration of lesbian cinema from the 1970s to now. Filmmakers Barbara Hammer, Su Friedrich, Rose Troche, Cheryl Dunye, Yoruba Richen, Desiree Akhavan, Vicky Du, film critic B. Ruby Rich, Jenni Olson, and others share from their lives and discuss how they've expressed lesbian and queer identity through film.

Cast reflects on and gives tribute to many influential films and television series:

- Appropriate Behavior (2014)
- Carol (2015)
- Before Stonewall (1984)
- Bound (1996)
- But I'm a Cheerleader (1999)
- The Celluloid Closet (1995)
- Desert Hearts (1985)
- This Film Is Not Yet Rated (2006)
- Go Fish (1994)
- High Art (1998)
- The Joy of Life (2005)
- The L Word television series (2004–2009)
- The Watermelon Woman (1996)

== Accolades ==
Caroline Berler received the Outfest 2018 Programming Award for Emerging Talent.
