= Børge Ring =

Danish animator

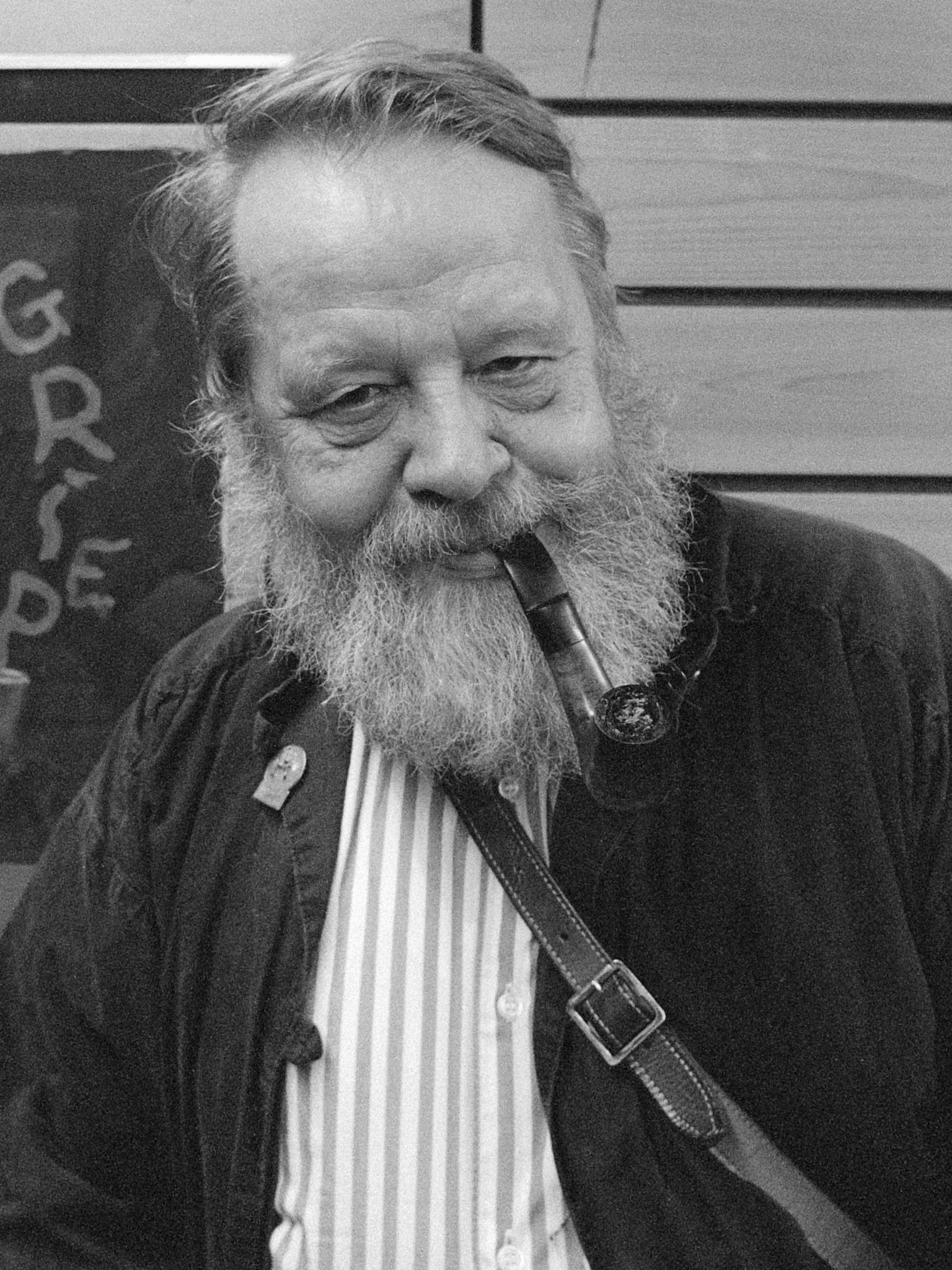
- Børge Ring in 1988
- Born: 17 February 1921; Ribe, Denmark
- Died: 27 December 2018 (aged 97); Ravenstein, Netherlands
- Occupations: Animated short film writer, director and animator
- Years active: 1947 – c. 1999
- Notable work: Oh My Darling (1978); Anna & Bella (1984)

Børge Ring (17 February 1921 – 27 December 2018) was a Danish animated short film writer, director and animator. His 1978 short film Oh My Darling won the Best Short Film award at the 1978 Cannes Film Festival, and his 1984 short film Anna & Bella won the Best Animated Short Film award at that year's Academy Awards.

== Personal life and death ==
Børge Ring was the son of composer Oluf Ring. He was born in Ribe, Denmark, and his family later moved to Funen. He married his first wife, concert pianist Nanny Elisabeth Wegener in 1944 - she died in Amsterdam in 1957 of heart failure. In 1971 he married his second wife Joanika Zwart, who worked as a sculptor, and they had two children.

Ring died on 27 December 2018 at the age of 97.

== Career ==
Early in his career Ring was active as a jazz contrabassist and guitarist, performing in several bands. Ring worked on an adaption of Hans Christian Andersen's fairy tale The Tinderbox, which was the first Danish animated feature. In 1947, Ring and his friends Bjørn Frank Jensen and Arne Rønde Christensen opened up a cartoon studio in Vedbæk near Copenhagen. The studio started by doing commercials. In 1952, Ring moved to the Netherlands to work for Toonder Studios. He worked for them until 1973, when he turned freelance. At one time he worked in London for Amblimation on Balto.

His 1978 short film Oh My Darling won the Best Short Film award at the 1978 Cannes Film Festival, and was nominated for the Best Animated Short Film award at the 1979 Academy Awards. The short was redubbed and aired on television in the United States as part of the short-lived series Jokebook. He worked on the introduction to the 1983 film Curse of the Pink Panther. Ring directed the 1984 short film Anna & Bella, which won the Best Animated Short Film award at the 1985 Academy Awards. In 1986, Ring composed a flute song for the Danish cartoon Valhalla. His 1999 short film Run of the Mill, which focused on the effects of taking drugs, won a UNICEF Children's Award in 2000. Ring also worked on It's the Great Pumpkin, Charlie Brown (1966), Heavy Metal (1981), and We're Back! A Dinosaur's Story (1993).

== Later years ==
In 2003, Ring became a Knight of the Order of the Netherlands Lion. In 2012, the main award of the Danish Animation Society was renamed The Børge Ring Award. In the same year, he won the Winsor McCay Award. In 2014, his autobiography was published.
