= Danish Animation Society =

The Danish Animation Society (Danish: Animationssammenslutningen ANIS) is an association for Danish animation professionals.

Among other objectives, the association distributes the Copy-Dan resources to Danish animators . These resources are awarded at 3 application deadlines annually.

The Association also arranges several events, such as The Animation Day, which has had notable guests such as the Oscar-award winning animation-film director Chris Landreth and the renowned Disney-animator Andreas Deja.

In addition the Association ANIS annually awards two prizes at the Odense International Film Festival. These are "The Børge Ring Award" and "Talentprisen". "The Børge Ring Award" was founded in 2007 and, as of 2015, winners of the competition can qualify for review by the Oscar committee.

The current board consists of Søren Fleng (chairman,) Sara Koppel (vice-chairwoman), Thomas Fenger, Peter Hausner, Rasmus Møller and Anders Nejsum.
