= Van Dyk =

Van Dyk or Vandyk is a toponymic meaning "from (the) dike". It is directly derived from the Dutch form Van Dijk, and is found in areas where Dutch immigration or administration took place.

Van Dyk

- Carl Vandyk (1851–1931), German-born British photographer
- Dan Van Dyk (1942–2004), American Washington state representative
- Ernst Van Dyk (born 1973), South African wheelchair athlete
- Hans van Dyk (born 1982), South African rugby player
- Jere Van Dyk (born 1945), American journalist
- Irene van Dyk (born 1972), South African-born New Zealand netball player
- Jenny van Dyk (born 1982), South African netball coach
- Jo-Ané van Dyk (born 1997), South African javelin thrower
- Johan van Dyk (born 1994), South African cricketer
- John Van Dyk (born 1753), American brevet major during the Revolutionary War
- Joost van Dyk (died c.1631), Dutch privateer
- Joseph van Dyk (1816-1890), Commandant-General of the Lydenburg Republic
- Kendall Van Dyk (born 1980), American Montana state senator
- Kobus van Dyk (born 1994), South African rugby player
- Leanne Van Dyk (born 1955), American reformed theologian
- Maks van Dyk (born 1992), South African rugby player
- Manie van Dyk (born 1955), South African politician
- Mitchell Van Dyk (born 1990), American football offensive tackle
- Paul van Dyk (born 1971), German electronic dance music DJ, musician and record producer
- Reed Van Dyk, American short film maker

== See also ==
- Dyk (surname)
- Van Dijk
- Van Dyck (surname)
- Van Dyke (disambiguation)
