= William Dyke (RAF airman) =

William Norman Dyke
- Born: Unknown
- Died: Unknown
- Military career
- Allegiance: United Kingdom
- Branch: British Army; Royal Air Force
- Rank: Serjeant
- Unit: No. 18 Squadron RAF
- Awards: Distinguished Conduct Medal; Distinguished Flying Medal

Serjeant William Norman Dyke, DCM, DFM was a British World War I flying ace credited with five aerial victories.

== Military service ==
Serving as an observer/gunner in No. 18 Squadron flying the DH.4, he gained his victories between 6 March and 20 July 1918. Having already been awarded the Distinguished Conduct Medal, he was awarded the Distinguished Flying Medal in September 1918, his citation reading:

No. 121180 Serjeant William Dyke, DCM. (Nuneaton)
On all occasions this N.C.O. observer has carried out his work conscientiously and well, notably when engaged on photographic service, obtaining excellent results often under very difficult conditions. Since joining his present squadron he has taken part in twenty-nine bombing raids, ten photographic flights, and fourteen reconnaissances, many at low altitudes. On four occasions he has encountered large formations of enemy aeroplanes, and has himself shot down out of control three machines.
