= Dyke (surname) =

Dyke is a surname. Notable people with the surname include:

- Edwin Dyke (1842–1919), English clergyman and cricketer
- Greg Dyke (born 1947), former Director General of the BBC and current Chairman of Brentford Football Club
- John Dyke (rugby player) (1884–1960), Wales international rugby union player
- John and Jennie Dyke, American aircraft designers
- Sarah Dyke (elected 2023), British politician
- William Dyke (1930-2016), mayor of Madison, Wisconsin
- Sir William Hart Dyke, 7th Baronet (1837–1931)
- William Dyke (aviator), English World War I flying ace
- William Dyke (baseball), (1906–1984), American baseball player

== See also ==
- Dykes (surname)
- Van Dyke (disambiguation)
