= Christina Van Dyke =

American philosopher

Education
- Education: Cornell University (PhD), Calvin College (BA)

Philosophical work
- Era: 21st-century philosophy
- Region: Western philosophy
- Institutions: Calvin University
- Main interests: medieval philosophy

Christina Van Dyke is an American philosopher and Term Professor of Philosophy at Barnard College at Columbia University. She is also Emerita Professor of Philosophy at Calvin University. She is known for her works on medieval philosophy.

== Books ==
- Christina Van Dyke, A Hidden Wisdom: Medieval Contemplatives on Self-Knowledge, Reason, Love, Persons, and Immortality, Oxford University Press, 2022, ISBN 9780198861683.
- Robert Pasnau (ed.), Christina Van Dyke (assoc. ed.), The Cambridge History of Medieval Philosophy (2 vols.), Cambridge University Press, 2010, ISBN 9780521866729.
- Aquinas's Ethics: Metaphysical Foundations, Moral Theory, and Theological Context, Christina Van Dyke, Colleen McCluskey, Rebecca Konyndyk DeYoung, University of Notre Dame Press, 2009, ISBN 9780268026011.
