= Gerrit van Dijk =

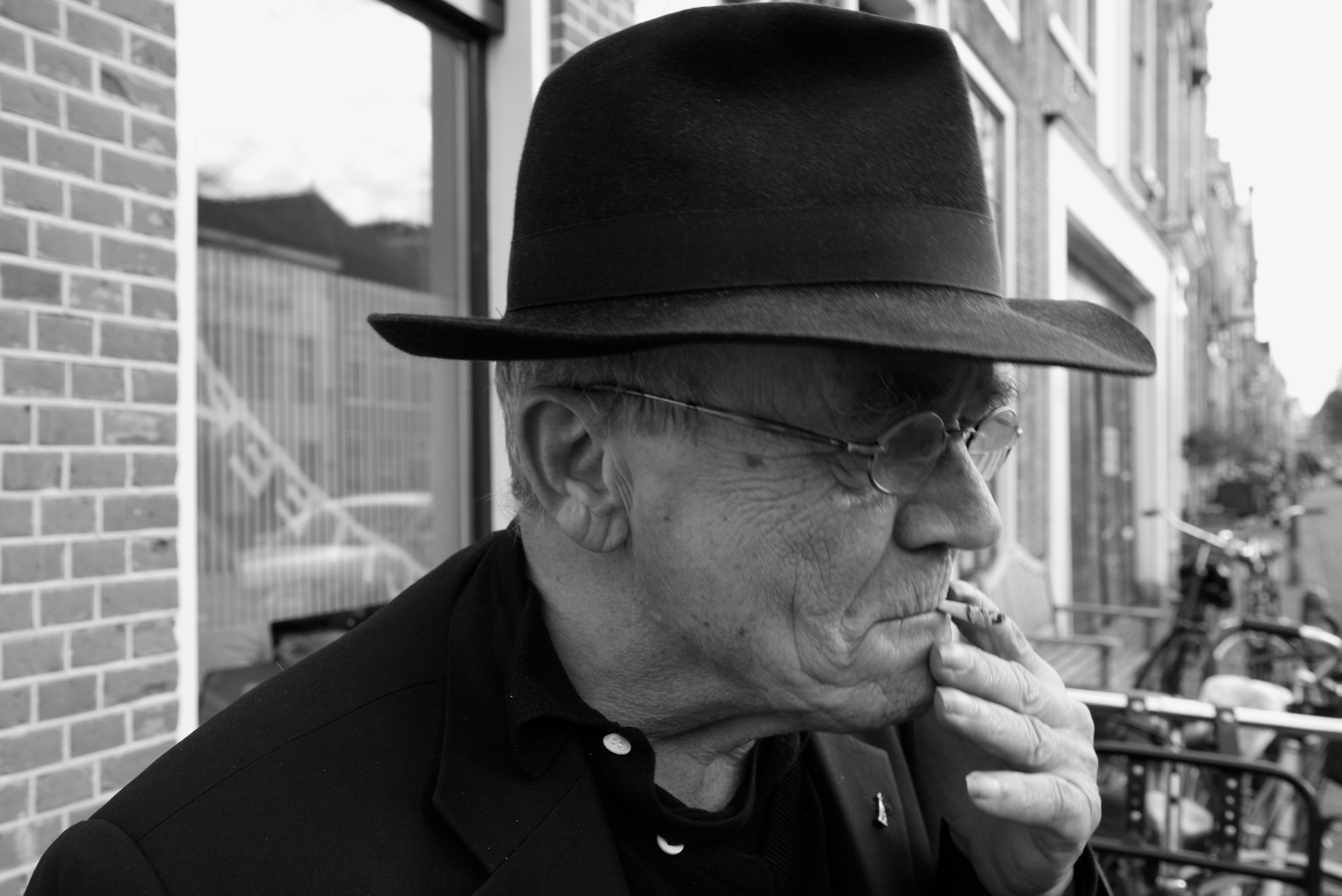
Gerrit van Dijk

Gerrit van Dijk (5 December 1938 – 4 December 2012) was a Dutch animator, film maker, actor and painter.

== Biography ==
Gerrit van Dijk was born in a Catholic family in the village of Volkel, in the municipality of Uden. He studied as a fifteen-year-old boy at the academy in Tilburg. He was not very satisfied about the school. "You only learn technique. The creativity you learn is no creativity at all. You know exactly what colour socks you should wear and what your hair should look like, but not how to put something on paper." After finishing his study, he initially became a teacher, then became a painter who frequently collaborated with other artists from other disciplines.

His painting career ended abruptly when he saw Norman McLaren's films and bought a double-eight camera. He made his first film It's Good in Heaven, seeing his shift to film as a logical continuation of his work as a painter, and considered his films moving paintings. In 1963 van Dijk married Cilia van Lieshout, a film producer who won an Academy Award for Best Animated Short Film.

Over time, Dijk moved away from classic filmmaking, instead creating collages combining photographs and image-by-image technique. He also experimented with various techniques, including cels, cut-outs, rotoscopy, pixilation, and live action combined with animation. He also joined a theatre group called Orkater that was set in Haarlem, Netherlands.

Dijk's films Pas a Deux and I move, so I am earned him Golden Bears at the Film Festspiele, Berlin in 1989 and 1998, respectively. He also received the Order of the Dutch Lion from Queen Beatrix of the Netherlands in 1998.

On 4 December 2012, van Dijk died from lung cancer.

== Filmography ==
Films of Gerrit van Dijk
Title	Length	Year
Far away from home	5.19 min	2009
Sold out	7.30 min	2006
Trailer for Filmmuseum	1.5 min	2005
The Letter	50 sec.	2004
Jute 14: Deed gij ook niet, wat U geschiedt?	3 min	2004
The last words of Dutch Schultz	23 min.	2003
I move, so I am	8.5 min.	1997
Frieze Frame	4.5 min.	1991
Janneke	8.5 min.	1990
Pas A Deux	5.5 min.	1988
A Good Turn Daily	13 min.	1983
Jute 9 Tanzen nach den Pfeifen von F.J.Strauss	3 min.	1979
Jute 2 Alle Menschen werden Brüder	3 min.	1979
Quod Libet	7.5 min.	1977
Sportflesh	3 min.	1976
Butterfly	3.5 min.	1973

== Sources ==
- Gloudemans, Ton (1990) Gerrit van Dijk: De kunst van de beweging, Haarlem: Stichting Animated People. ISBN 9094014653 9789094014650
- Heesen, Hans & Veerkamp, Lex (2013) Ik ben blij dat ik er geweest ben. Gerrit van Dijk Uden 5.12.1938-Haarlem 4.12.2012, Utrecht: Stichting Holland Animation Film Festival.
- Peters, Mette (2019) “Verf en kleurpotlood. Animatiefilmer Gerrit van Dijk (1938-2012)”, in: Haarlem Filmstad. Harry Hosman (sam.), Eindhoven: Lecturis. ISBN 9789462262928
- Overtoom, Jacques & Koster, Gonda (eds.) (2020) Gerrit van Dijk, hommage aan een inspirerende dwarsligger. Haarlem: Jacques Overtoom / Gonda Koster (eigen beheer).
