= Devil's Dyke =

Devil's Dyke may refer to:

- Devil's Dykes, a series of Roman fortifications between Hungary and Serbia
- Devil's Dyke, Cambridgeshire, an earthen barrier in eastern Cambridgeshire
- Devil's Dyke, Hertfordshire, a prehistoric defensive ditch in Hertfordshire
- Devil's Dyke, Sussex, a valley on the South Downs Way

See also:

- Deil's Dyke, earthwork in Scotland
