= Thomas Acland =

Thomas Acland may refer to:

- Sir Thomas Dyke Acland, 7th Baronet (1722–1785), MP for Devon 1746–1747 and Somerset 1767–1768
- Sir Thomas Dyke Acland, 9th Baronet (1752–1794), son of the 7th Baronet
- Sir Thomas Dyke Acland, 10th Baronet (1787–1871), MP for Devonshire and Devonshire North, son of the 9th Baronet
- Sir Thomas Dyke Acland, 11th Baronet (1809–1898), MP for Devon North and Somerset West, Privy Counsellor, son of the 10th Baronet
- Sir Thomas Dyke Acland, 12th Baronet (1842–1919), British politician, son of the 11th Baronet

== See also ==
- Acland baronets
- Thomas Dyke Acland Tellefsen, Norwegian composer
