= Dykes, Missouri =

Unincorporated community in Missouri, U.S.

Coordinates: 37°20′01″N 92°06′57″W

Dykes is an unincorporated community in southwest Texas County, in the U.S. state of Missouri. Dykes is located on Missouri Route 38, seven miles west of Houston.

== History ==
A post office called Dykes was established in 1871, and remained in operation until 1933. The community's name is taken by John Dykes, a pioneer citizen.
