= Abraham van Dijck =

Dutch Golden Age painter

- Born: June 1635; Amsterdam
- Died: 27 August 1680 (aged 45); Dordrecht

Abraham van Dijck (June 1635 in Amsterdam – 27 August 1680 in Dordrecht), was a Dutch Golden Age painter.

== Biography ==
According to the RKD he was a Rembrandt pupil based on the style Rembrandt was using in the 1650s. His earliest works are dated 1655. Though he is registered as working in Dordrecht and clearly was in Amsterdam, he is also registered in Alkmaar in 1659. Besides Rembrandt, his works show the influence of Gabriël Metsu, Caspar Netscher and Quiringh Gerritsz van Brekelenkam.

There is a fine painting by Abraham Van Dijk in the Brigham Young University Museum of Art in Provo, Utah ("Tobias Leaving His Parents").

== Works ==
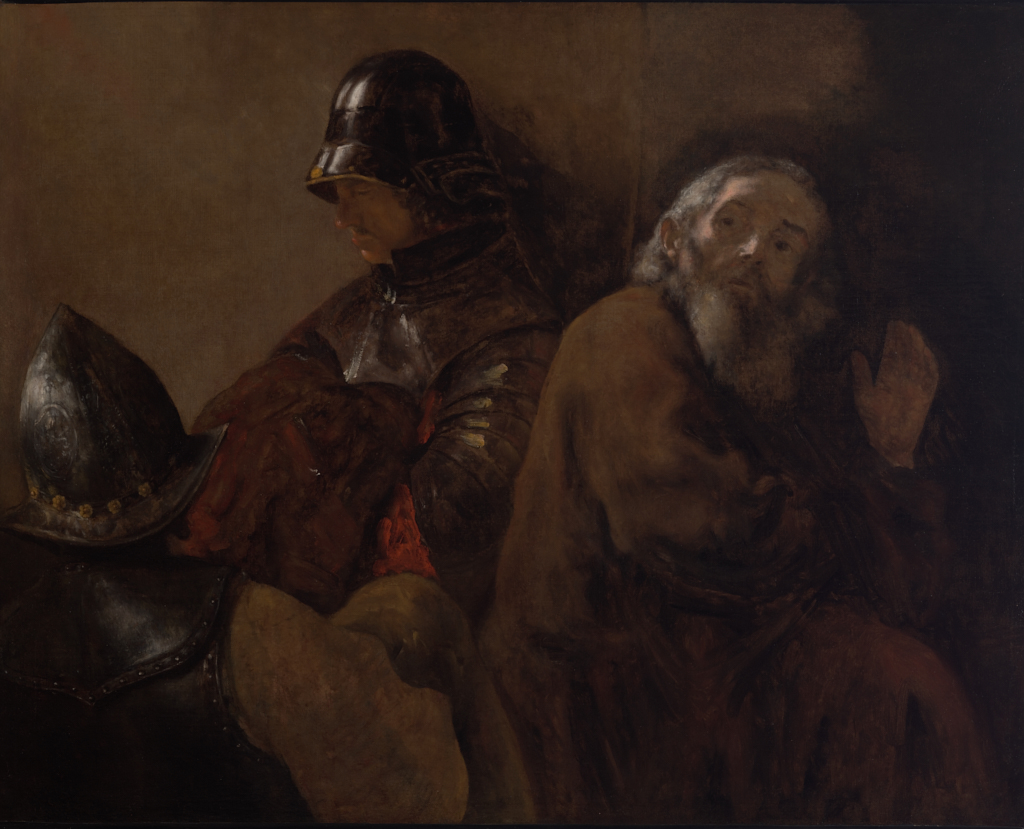
The Liberation of St. Peter, 1652

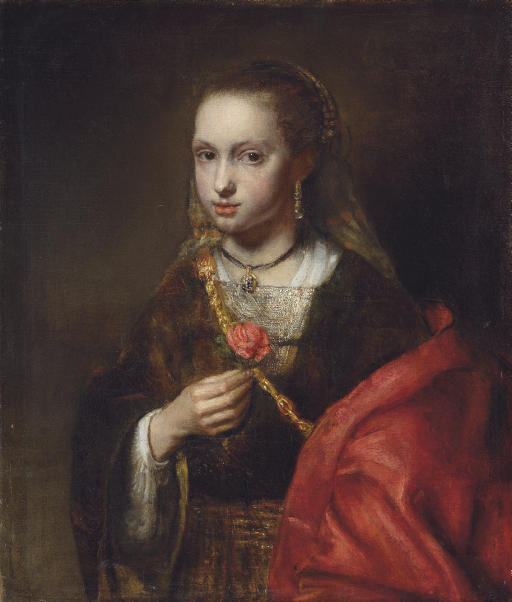
Girl holding a rose, c.1655

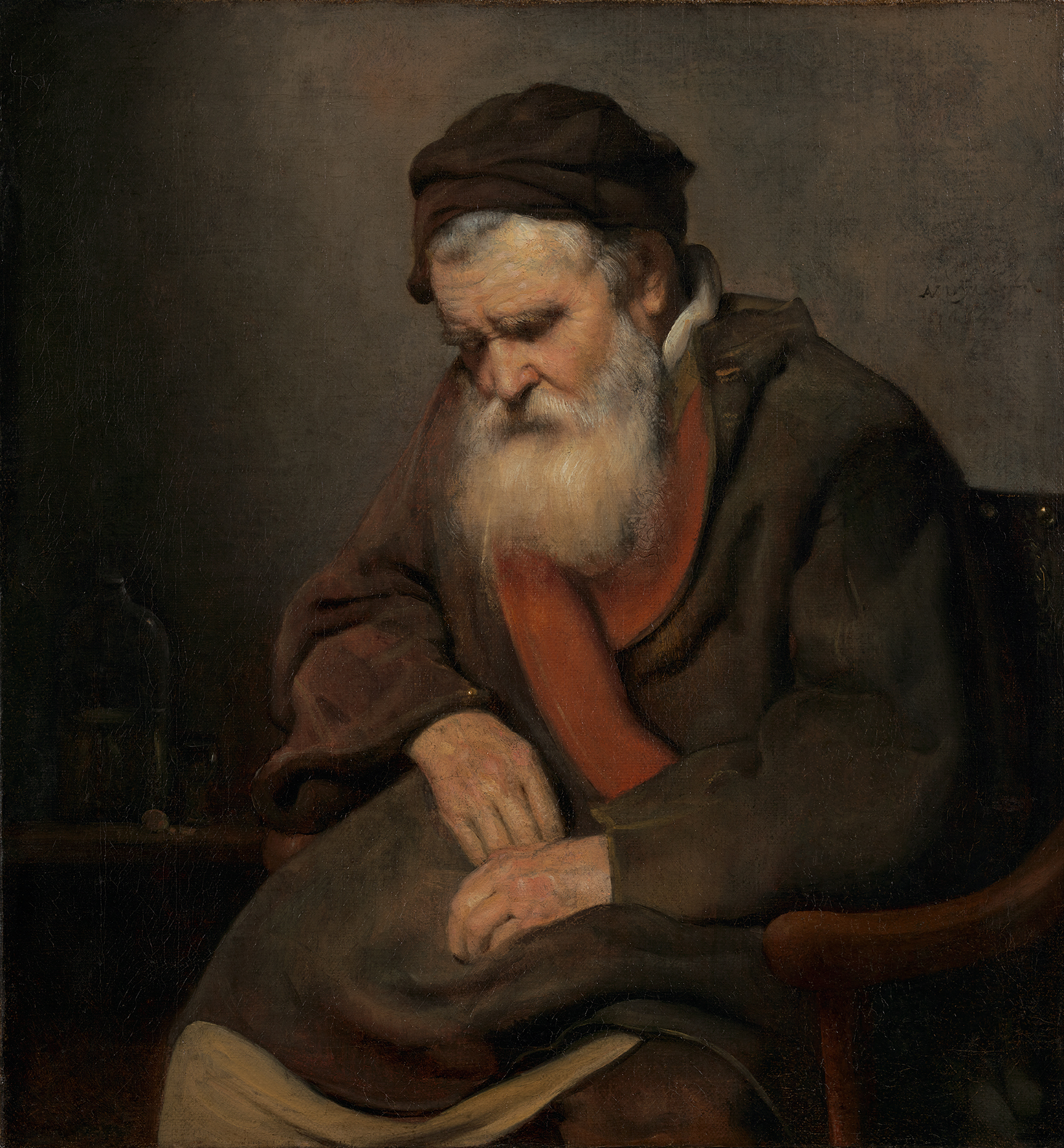
Old Man, Asleep, 1656

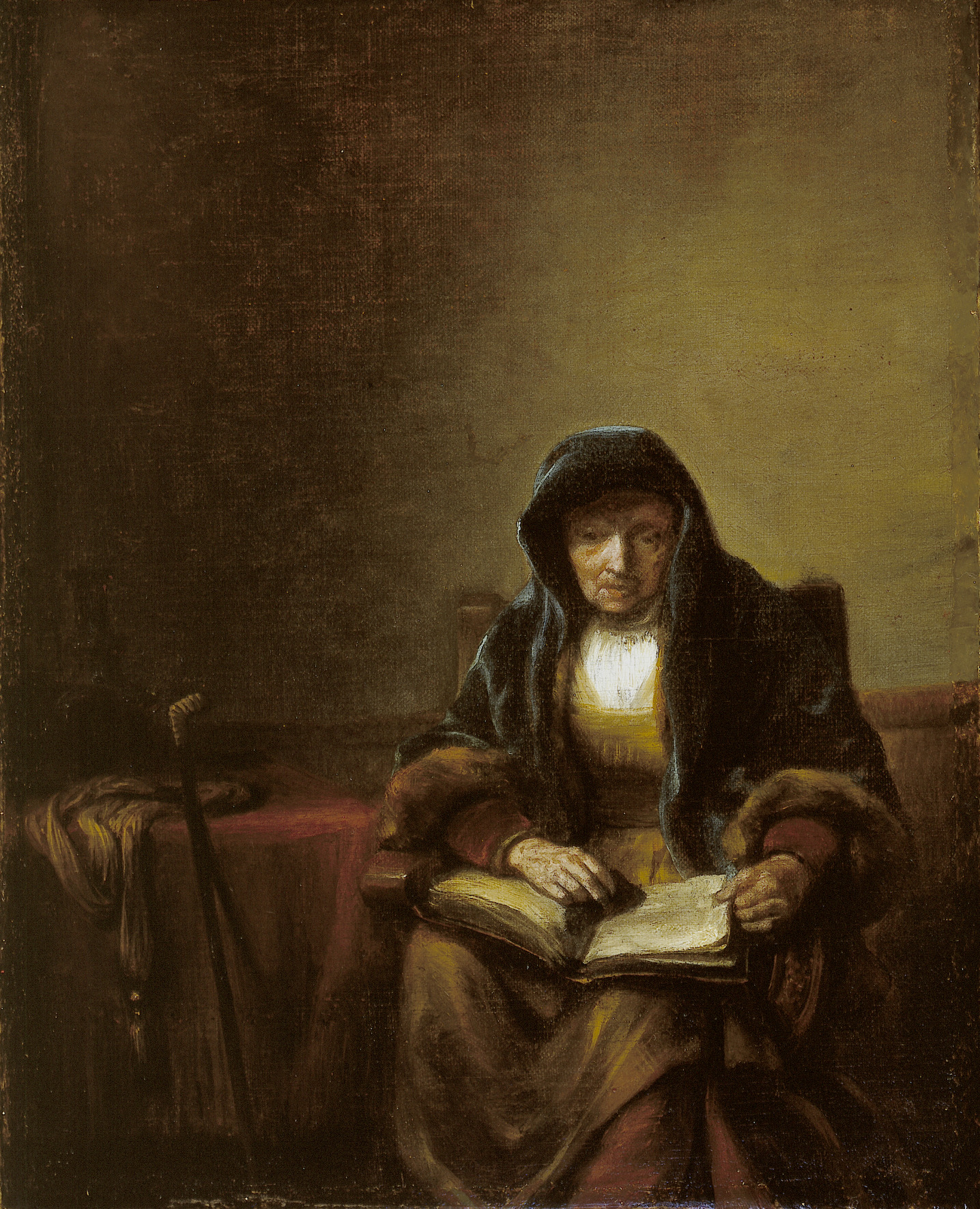
Old Woman with a Book, 1659

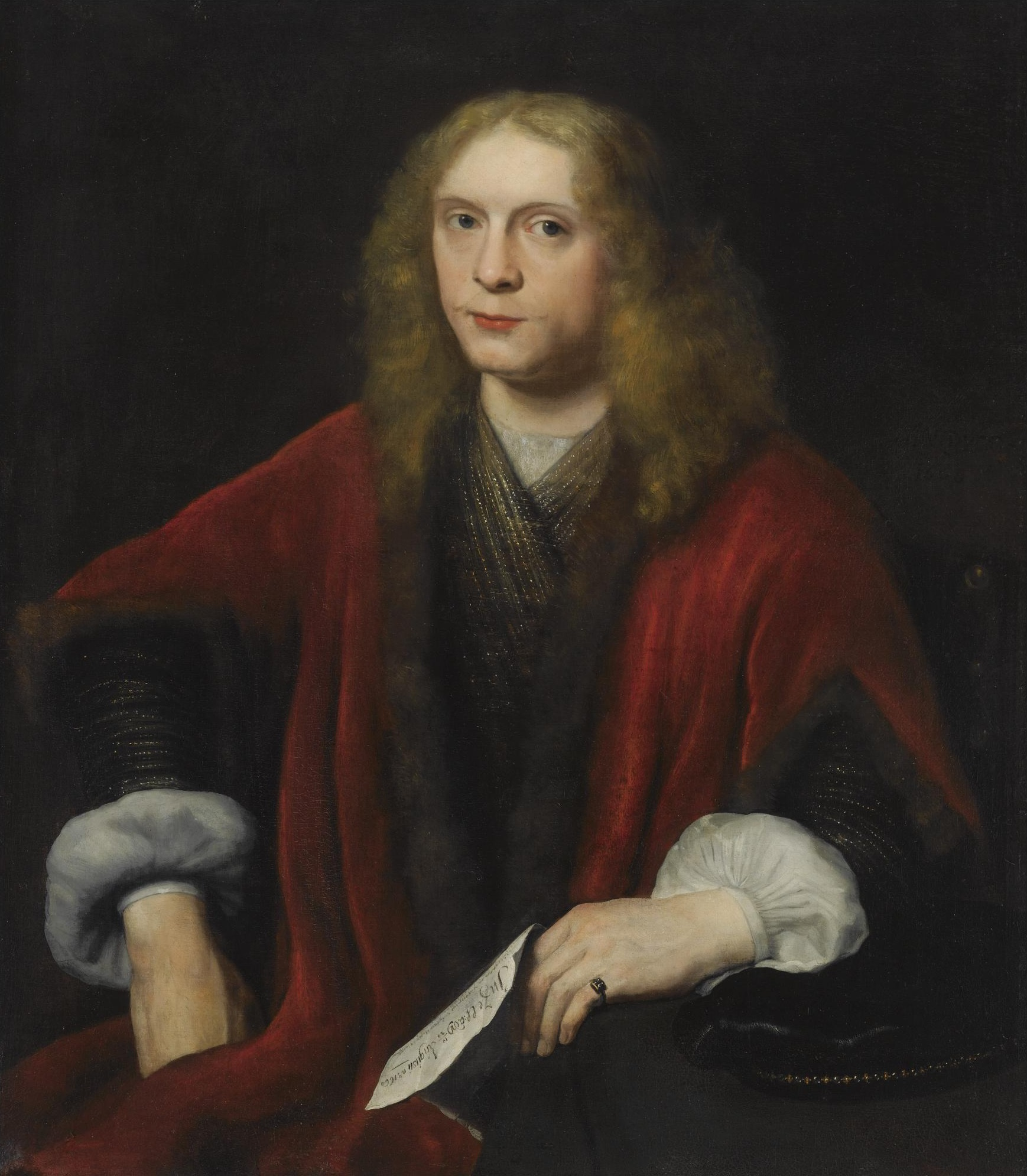
Portrait of a gentleman, probably Johannes van Zell, 1660
