= Levesque =

Levesque or Lévesque is a surname of French origin, equivalent to English Bishop, and may refer to:

- Alice Lemieux-Lévesque (1905–1983), Canadian-American writer
- André M. Levesque (born 1959), Canadian historian, military officer, and civil servant
- Andrea Levesque, American media personality
- Andrée Lévesque (born 1939), Canadian historian
- Annie Levesque (born 1979), Canadian volleyball player
- Arianna Steckler Levesque, American media personality
- Athena Levesque, American media personality
- Cassandra Levesque (born c. 1999), American politician
- Chris Levesque (born 1980), Canadian ice hockey player
- Christian Lévesque (born 1970), Canadian politician
- Crystal Levesque, Canadian animal scientist and nutritionist
- Elyse Levesque (born 1985), Canadian film and television actress
- Emilien Levesque (1922–2003), American politician
- Emily Levesque (born 1984), American astrophysicist
- François Lévesque (1732–1787), French-born Canadian merchant and politician
- François Lévesque (lawyer) (1772–1823), Canadian lawyer and politician
- Georges-Henri Lévesque (1903–2000), Canadian Dominican priest and sociologist
- Gérard D. Levesque (1926–1993), Canadian politician
- Hector Levesque (born 1951), Canadian academic and AI researcher
- J. Adrien Lévesque (1923–1995), Canadian politician
- James Levesque (1962–2014), American punk-rock musician
- Jean-François Lévesque, Canadian animator
- Jean-Louis Lévesque (1911–1994), Canadian entrepreneur, racehorse owner, and philanthropist
- Joanna Levesque (born 1990), American singer and songwriter known as JoJo
- Joseph L. Levesque (born c. 1940), American Catholic priest and educator
- Laurent Levesque (born 1970), French film composer
- Laurier Lévesque (1929–2005), Canadian politician
- Léo Lévesque, Canadian poet and writer
- Léonard Lévesque (1935–2017), Canadian politician
- Louise Levesque (1703–1745), French author
- Marcel Lévesque (1877–1962), French actor
- Marie-Christine Lévesque (1958–2020), Canadian author
- Marylise Lévesque (born 1983), Canadian judoka
- Mathieu Lévesque, Canadian politician
- Melanie Levesque (born 1957), American politician
- Moe Levesque (born 1937/1938), Canadian football player
- Nicole Levesque (born 1972), American basketball player
- Paul Levesque, better known as Triple H (born 1969), American wrestler and actor
- Raymond Lévesque (1928–2021), Canadian singer-songwriter and poet
- René Lévesque (1922–1987), Canadian politician, 23rd Premier of Quebec
- Robert P. Levesque, American politician
- Roger Levesque (born 1981), American soccer player
- Roger J.R. Levesque (born 1963), American criminologist
- Stephanie McMahon Levesque (born 1976), American wrestler and businesswoman; wife of Paul Levesque/Triple H
- Sylvain Lévesque (born 1973), Canadian politician
- Valerie Levesque (born 1974), American reporter
- Yves Lévesque (born 1957), Canadian politician
- Yvon Lévesque (born 1940), Canadian politician

== See also ==
- Leveque
