= Henri Van Dyck =

Belgian painter

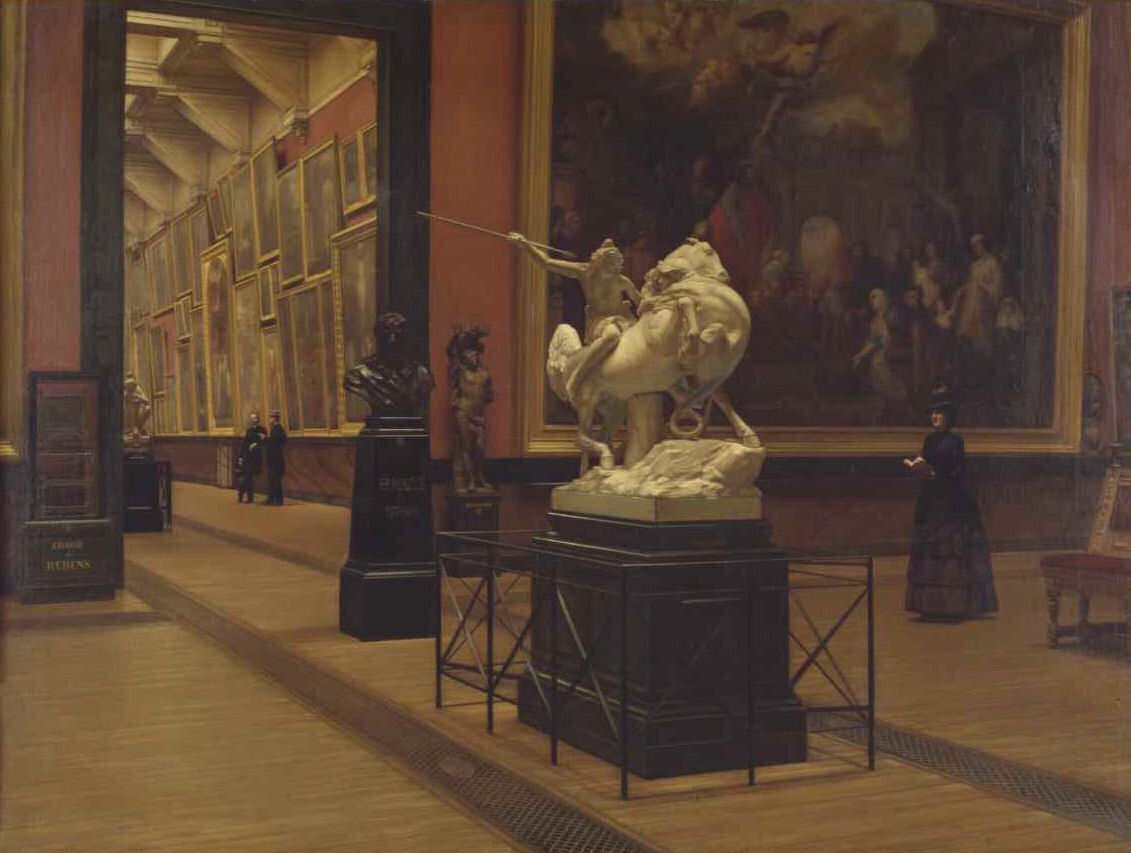
Interior View of the Royal Museum of Fine Arts Antwerp

Henri Joseph Van Dyck (25 March 1849, Bruges - 9 February 1934, Antwerp) was a Belgian painter.

== Biography ==
Around 1869, he was enrolled at the art school in Roubaix, where he studied with Alphonse Colas. Later, he was at the Royal Academy of Fine Arts in Antwerp, where his instructors included Jozef Van Lerius. His works consist largely of portraits and genre scenes, rendered in great realistic detail.

He was the father of Victor Van Dyck, an 1889 finalist in the Prix de Rome, and the grandfather of Max Van Dyck, winner of a gold medal at the Prix de Rome of 1920. Max was married to Éliane de Meuse, the first woman to win the Prix Godecharle (1921).

His works may be seen at the Royal Museum of Fine Arts Antwerp.

== Sources ==
- Wim Pas, Greet Pas (Eds.), Dictionnaire biographique. Arts plastiques en Belgique. Peintres, sculptures, graveurs, 1800-2002, De Gulden Roos, Anvers, 2002 ISBN 978-90-7613-802-2
- Allgemeines Künstlerlexikon, Vol.31, De Gruyter, Berlin, 2002
