= Prix Godecharle =

The Prix Godecharle (Dutch: Godecharleprijs), also known in English as the Godecharle Prize or the Godecharle Contest, is a contest for art students, the winners of which are granted a scholarship allocated by the Godecharle Foundation. The prize allows young talents, unknown before the award, to become recognized by a panel of experts made up of famous artists. The conditions for participation are that contestants are less than 35 years old, of Belgian nationality, or members of a country of the European Community who have lived in Belgium for at least five years. The renown of the contest is based, amongst other things, upon the reputation of the artists who sit on the jury.

Napoléon Godecharle created the Godecharle Foundation on 15 March 1871 in remembrance of his father, the prominent sculptor Gilles-Lambert Godecharle, with the aim of promoting the education and the career of young Belgian artists, either sculptors, painters or architects. To this end, the Prix Godecharle is organized by the foundation every other year. The foundation has entrusted a provincial board, the so-called Commission Provinciale des Fondations de bourses d’études du Brabant, with the management of the contest and the follow-up exhibitions of the works of participants. The Godecharle bursaries are allocated by this board, on proposals made up by the jury of renowned artists.

== The contest ==
The first contest was organized in 1881. At the start, the competition took place every three years on the occasion of the Salons triennaux des Beaux-Arts de Bruxelles in Belgium. Because of the First World War, the contest was adjourned until 1921. Since 1933, it is held every two years.

The laureates win prize money of €5,000, granted in two instalments over two years. In accordance with its founder's wishes, the winners have to spend this money on travelling abroad in order to improve their education or to conduct research, traditionally in Italy, the ceaseless return to Renaissance sources.

== The jury ==
Many famous painters, sculptors and architects of these last hundred years have accepted to be members of the contest's jury. Some of them are internationally recognized, including Emile Claus, Paul Delvaux, Léon Frédéric, Fernand Khnopff, Constant Permeke, Jean Brusselmans, Louis Van Lint, Victor Bourgeois, and Pierre Alechinsky.

The successful careers of some of the winners also boosted the renown of this contest. These winners included personalities such as Victor Horta, Egide Rombaux, Victor Rousseau, John Cluysenaar, Tom Frantzen, Olivier Leloup, Guillaume Van Strydonck, Éliane de Meuse, Taf Wallet, Alfred Bastien and Isidore Opsomer.

A significant milestone in the history of the contest was the first grant of the prize to a female sculptor in 1921. The winner Éliane de Meuse was only twenty-two years old when she won the prize. and the awarding panel comprised the Belgian symbolist Alberto Ciamberlani, Armand Rassenfosse and the Belgian neo-impressionist Emile Claus. The winning work, entitled Daphnis et Chloé was of an impressive size, i.e. 225 cm by 180 cm, and depicted a naked young couple in an embrace. In his report to the Minister, the chairman of the panel highlighted the stylistic qualities of the composition.

== The laureates ==
The laureates of the Prix Godecharle from 1881 to the present:

Year	Sculpture	Painting	Architecture
1881		Eugène Broerman	
1884	Paul Du Bois	Guillaume Van Strydonck	Victor Horta
1887	Égide Rombeaux	José Dierickx	Michel De Braey
1890	Victor Rousseau	Auguste Leveque	Adolphe Kockerols
1893		Adolphe Wansart	
1894		Ernest Wante and Eduard Van Esbroeck	Émile Lambot
1897	Edward Deckers and Jacques Marin	Alfred Bastien	
1900	Paul Nocquet	Philippe Swyncop and Paul Artot	Paul Bonduelle
1903	Charles De Brichy	Isidore_Opsomer	Joseph Van Neck
1907	Charles Collard	Joe English	Pol Berger
1910	Marnix d'Haveloose	Pol Vandebroek	Arthur Smet
1913	Alfred Courtens	François Pycke	Jean Hendrickx
1921		Éliane de Meuse (first woman to win the prize)	
1924	John Cluysenaar	Léon Navez	Antoine Courtens
1926	Jeanne Louise Milde		
1928	Fernand Debonnaires	Taf Wallet	Victor Maeremans
1931		Peter Colfs and Maurice Schelck	
1933	Pol Van Esbroeck	Jean Vander Loo	
1935		Geert Reusens	Emile Demey and Renaat Braem
1937			Georges Lambeau
1939	Elisabeth Barmarin	Gustave Camus	
1941	Albert Baisieux	Luc Peire	
1943	Lode Eyckermans	Maurits Van Saene	Clara Bourgonjon
1945			
1947	André Hupet		
1949	Rik Poot	Jacques Lussie	
1951	Robert Coolen		
1953			
1955	Christian Leroy		
1957	Jean-Pierre Ghysels	Jacqueline Desmare	Jean Wilfart
1959	Pol Spilliaert		
1961	Frans Van Den Brande	Solange François	Jean-Pierre Santenois
1963		Karel Dierickx	
1965			
1967		Nathalie Van Lierde	
1969		Christine Teller	Johan Baele
1971			Wim Mortelmans and Jean-Claude Herman
1973		Christian Rolet	Claude Leveque
1975		Marianne Dock	Luke Vanhooren
1977	Olivier Leloup	Jacques 't Kindt	
1979	Eddy Walrave	Herman Maes	Paul Robbrecht
1981	Tom Frantzen		Christian Kieckens
1983	Vincent Rouseau and Lucie Sentjens	Barthel Ritzen	
1985	Bart Decq	Elsje Lemaire	Luc Van De Steene
1987	Louis Halleux	Daniel Colin	
1989	Bart De Zutter	Gery De Smet	Martine De Maeseneer
1991	Sven 't Jolle	Nico De Gughtenaere	
1993	Robin Vokaer	Stefan Annerel	Nathalie Vervenne
1995	Alexandra Jacquet	Yves Lecomte	
1997	Christina Van Glabeke, Mario Ferretti (mention)	Katleen Vermeir, Xavier Martin (mention)	Peter Swinnken, Pierre Lemaire (mention)
1999	Alexis Remacle	Sarah Walraet	Pierre Lemaire
2001		Thijs Snauwaert	Vincent Callebaut and Caroline Voet
2003	Denis Mahin	Stephan Balleux, Baptiste Colmant (mention), Vasken Mardikian (mention)	Leonard Gellegos, Evelyne Hamblok (mention), Cedric Libert (mention), Olivier Mylle(mention)
2005	Nick Ervinck, Cathy Weyders (mention)	Boris Thiebaut, Chiel Lambrecht (mention), Vincent Verscheure (mention)	Pieter D'Haeseleer
2007		Marie Zolamian	Kelly Hendriks
2009	Steve Dehoux	Anna-Maija Rissanen	Chloé Dewolf
2011	Caroline de Sauvage	Lucie Flamant	Axel Clissen
2013	Nel Bonte	Pierre Maurcot	Steven Schenk
2015	Ronja Schlickmann	Hadrien Bruyaux	Evelyne Baeten
2017	Conrad Willems	Charlotte Flamand	Wouter Verstraete
2022			Cente Van Hout, Tomás Barberá Ramallo (mention)

== See also ==
- Rome Prize
- List of European art awards
