= Leveque =

Leveque (Lévêque, Levêque) is a surname, and may refer to:

- Auguste Levêque, Belgian painter
- Aurélie Lévêque, French short-track speed skater
- Christophe Lévêque, French BMX racer
- Dorian Lévêque, French footballer
- Guy Leveque, Canadian ice hockey player
- John Leveque, sound editor
- Leslie L. LeVeque, inventor of the automatic pinsetter, after whom the LeVeque Tower was named
- Louise Leveque de Vilmorin, French writer
- Matt Leveque, Canadian lacrosse player
- Pierre Lévêque (1921–2004), French hellenist and historian
- Randall J. LeVeque, American mathematician
- Roger Lévêque, French bicycle racer
- William J. LeVeque (1923–2007), American mathematician

== See also ==
- Levesque
