= Éliane de Meuse =

Belgian painter (1899–1993)

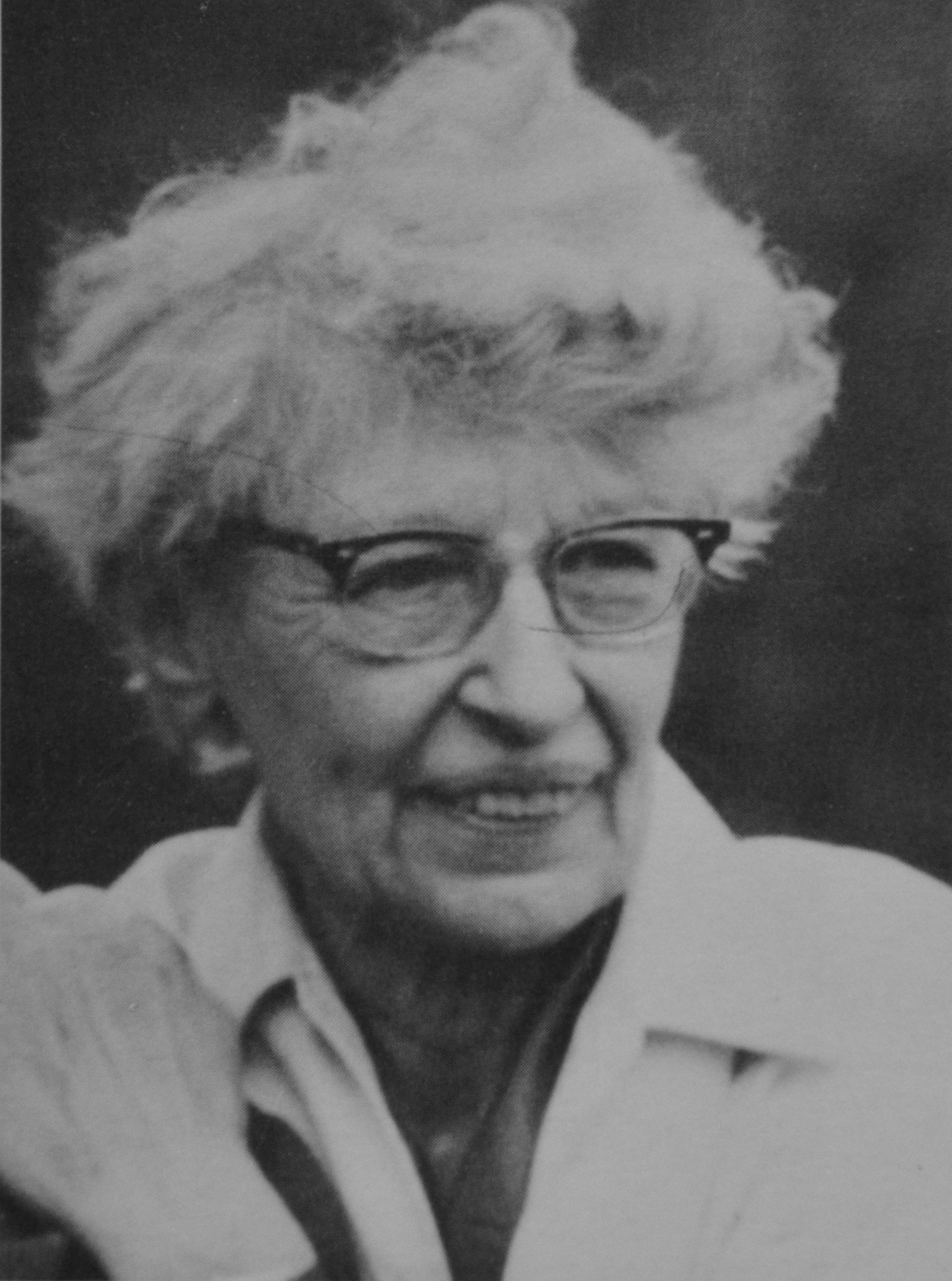
- Born: Éliane de Meuse; 9 August 1899; Brussels, Belgium
- Died: 3 February 1993 (aged 93); Forest, Brussels, Belgium
- Education: Académie Royale des Beaux-Arts, Brussels from 1916 to 1920 – inscription number 18568
- Known for: Painting and Music (Violinist)
- Notable work: Daphnis et Chloé (225 x 180 cm), rewarded by the Prix Godecharle in 1921
- Movement: None. However some historians refer the very beginning of her career to Impressionism and to Fauvisme brabançon
- Awards: The Godecharle prize 1921 (the first time won by a woman in the story of the contest)

Éliane Georgette Diane de Meuse (9 August 1899 – 3 February 1993) was a Belgian painter. She was the wife of Max Van Dyck. They met at the Académie Royale des Beaux-Arts, Brussels where they attended the courses of the same professors.

== Biography ==
Eliane de Meuse took her first drawing lessons at the age of fourteen with Ketty Hoppe, the wife of the Belgian painter Victor Gilsoul.

She also trained in the studio of the genre painter Guillaume Van Strydonck, member of Les XX and James Ensor's friend. At the same time, she received advice from the sculptor Marcel Rau, Prix de Rome 1908.

In 1916, Meuse decided to become a painter and joined L'Académie Royale des Beaux-Arts, Brussels. There, she met the young painter Max Van Dyck, (23 December 1902, (Brussels – Schaerbeek) – 26 December 1992, (Brussels – Ixelles) and married him in 1922. The latter had won the great Prix de Rome (Belgium) in 1920 when he was only 17 years old, a sensational event widely commented on in the Belgian press. He later taught the Decorative arts at the Académie des beaux-arts d'Anderlecht of which he eventually became the director.

At the Academy (ARBA, Brussels) Meuse was the student of the Symbolist painter Jean Delville and the portraitist Herman Richir.

From all of these influences, her art developed into a style similar to Post-Impressionism, her subject matter including portraits, figures, seascapes, landscapes and still lifes. In some of her latest paintings underlying abstract structure can be observed.

Critics noted that Eliane de Meuse had inherited much from the Belgian Luminism, movement of the very early 20th century, which combined aspects of Realism (Realist visual arts), Impressionism and Neo-Impressionism. It got its name from the style of Emile Claus and a few other painters, grouped in a circle called Vie et Lumière (Life and light) of which Claus was one of the main founders.

Charles Bernard, the foremost Belgian critic at that time wrote that he considered the art of Eliane de Meuse as aimed towards a pure, clear artistic ideal, without any selfish motives. He felt that the artist did not belong to the Impressionism of Emile Claus, so close to French Pointillism, but that she was the spiritual daughter of James Ensor.

In an article published on 22 October 1936 in the Nation belge, he commented on Meuse's first exhibition in these words: A discovery... an artist that reinvents James Ensor and Rik Wouter's impressionism, that enriches impressionism with new elements, in terms of richness and interpretation indicating the presence of a personality... This exhibition took place in the Palais des Beaux-Arts (Centre for Fine Arts, Brussels), where a collection of paintings representing the outcome of fourteen years of dedication in the pursuit of personal expression was presented.

The same year, in Le Courrier d’Anvers, Sander Pierron, another influential critic, wrote that he believed this young artist was called to a great destiny. He described Eliane de Meuse as a born colourist with a prodigious talent: Since Rik Wouters such talent had not been observed... she is a colourist able to seize the tiniest variations of light and uses them with harmony as a musician should do with notes, displaying a personal feeling.

K. de Bergen also noted the interesting use of colour in her works and added that she demonstrates that: the colour possesses its own truth.

Another critic signing his article by L. J. considered that we must place Eliane de Meuse amongst the most sensitive painters such as Édouard Manet or Marcel Jefferys.

In his monograph dedicated to Eliane de Meuse Paul Caso wrote that: Every type of art work has been tackled, with a natural inclination for still lifes (frequently with wonderful flowers from her garden), the true nub of her work, often studied as a pile of objects, masks, flowers, draperies, many times assembled around the same chair from her studio, a chair which acquires a real personality, in an apparent disorder of forms and colours.

In 1921, she won the Prix Godecharle created in 1881 by Napoleon Godecharle, the son of Gilles-Lambert Godecharle. This prize gave her the opportunity to travel in Italy, the shock of a whole civilization, the ceaseless return to Renaissance sources.

== Main individual exhibitions ==
- Palais des Beaux-arts de Bruxelles – 1936 (Belgium)
- Cercle artistique d'Anvers – 1936 (Belgium)
- Galerie Rencontre – 94 Louise Avenue, Brussels – 1981 (Belgium)
- Kelterhaus-Muffendorf – Bonn (Bad-Godesberg) – 1982 (Germany)
- Rétrospective organized by the City of Brussels and by the Crédit Général, a Belgian bank located, Grand Place nr 5 at Brussels – 1991 (Belgium)

== International group exhibitions ==
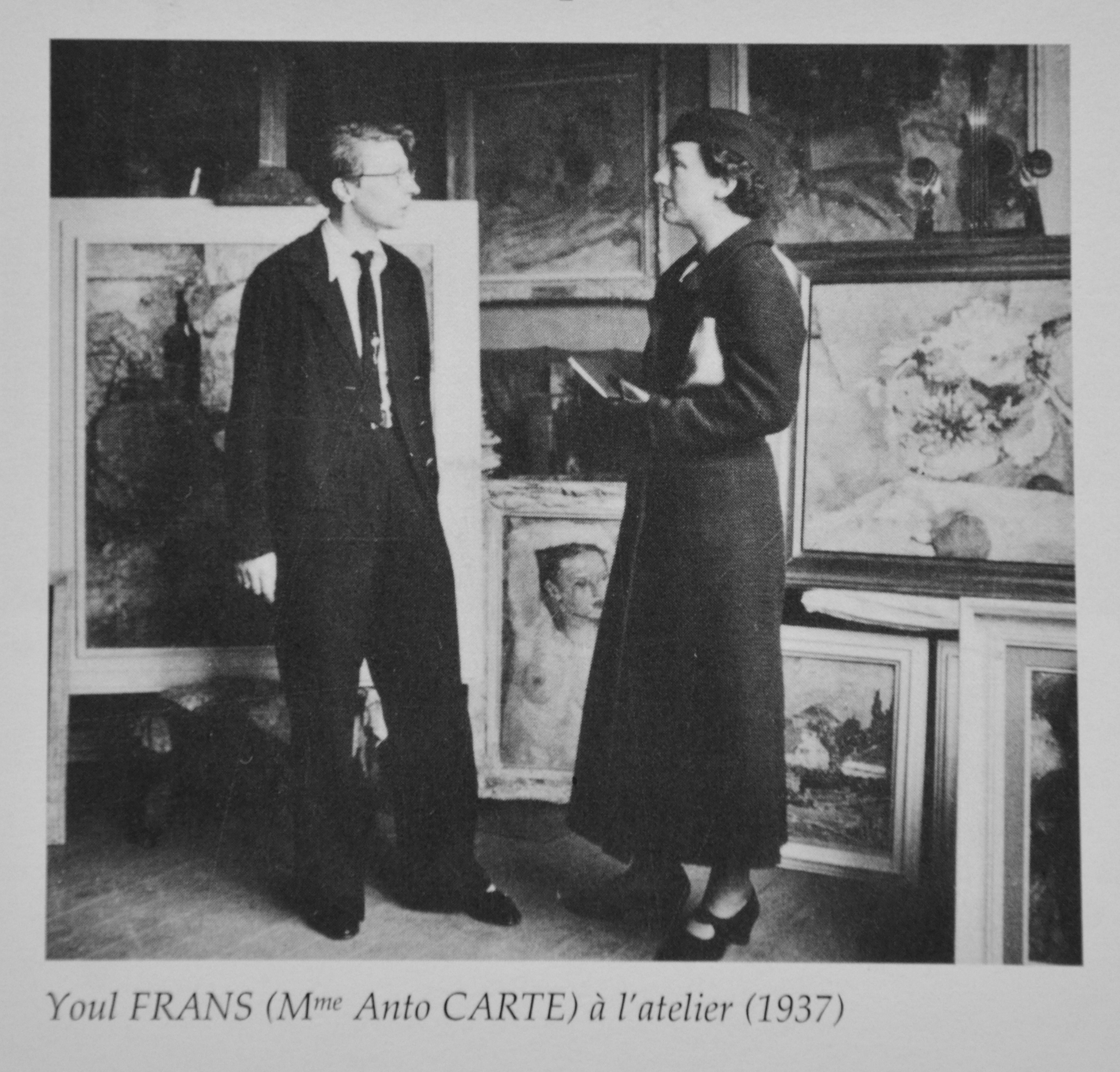
Eliane de Meuse in her studio with Mrs Youl Frans, the Belgian Anto Carte painter's wife, 1937.

- Les femmes artistes d'Europe, Galerie nationale du Jeu de Paume in Paris with representatives of the Impressionism Berthe Morisot, Mary Cassatt, Marie Laurencin and Marie Bashkirtseff 1937
- l'Art belge, at The Carnegie Institute (Carnegie Museums of Pittsburgh in United States) with other Belgian painters: Anto-Carte, Constant Permeke, Gustave De Smet, Isidore Opsomer and René Magritte 1937 and 1938
- Exposition du Progrès social, at the Galerie du Palais de la Mairie de Lille (France) – 1939
- Le Fauvisme brabançon organized at the Cercle artistique communal de Waterloo (Les Ecuries) not far from Brussels (Belgium) from September, 14 to 27 October 1996, with Rik Wouters, Jos Albert, Charles Dehoy, Philibert Cockx, Jean Brusselmans, Ramah, Ferdinand Schirren etc.

== Some of her paintings ==
- Daphnis and Chloé, oil on canvas (225 x 180 cm) – Godecharle Award 1921
- Les Dahlias blancs, oil on canvas, former private collection of the Queen of the Belgians, Elisabeth of Bavaria
- Still life with red shoes, 1944, oil on canvas (71,5 x 80 cm), collection of Museum of Fine Arts, Ghent (MSK), Belgium, in the Eliane de Meuse monograph of Paul Caso edited by Editions Prefilm, Brussels, 1991, page 26
- L'enfant, oil on canvas (60 x 48 cm), collection of Musée des Beaux-Arts Tournai, Belgium, in the museum 's catalogue of paintings and sculptures, page 68 (inventory's number 451) and in the Eliane de Meuse monograph of Paul Caso edited by Editions Prefilm, Brussels, 1991, page 21
- Marianne, oil on canvas (81 x 61 cm), collection of Musée des Beaux-Arts Tournai, Belgium, in the museum 's catalogue of paintings and sculptures, page 68 (inventory's number 453) and in the Eliane de Meuse monograph of Paul Caso edited by Editions Prefilm, Brussels, 1991, page 56
- Bouquet, oil on canvas stuck on panel (60 x 50 cm), collection of Musée des Beaux-Arts Tournai, Belgium, in the museum 's catalogue of paintings and sculptures, page 68 (inventory's number 452)
- Nu à contre-jour, circa 1920, oil on canvas (99,5 x 80 cm), private Belgian collection, in Paul Piron's dictionary, volume 3, page 234
- Rêverie, 1932, oil on canvas (80 x 70 cm), private Belgian collection, reproduced in the catalogue of The Concours Godecharle created by Gilles-Lambert Godecharle and in the Eliane de Meuse monograph of Paul Caso edited by Editions Prefilm, Brussels, 1991, page 52
- Centaurées, oil on canvas, (80 x 70 cm), entered in January 1992 into the CBC Banque's collection (formerly Crédit Général). This painting mentioned in the catalogue of the works exhibited in the Brussels Gallery of the Crédit Général under reference nr 23, was offered by the artist to the bank for their free sponsoring.
- ... and in the Belgian State collections Interieur, oil on canvas (61,5 x 60,5 cm), in the Eliane de Meuse monograph by Paul Caso edited by Editions Prefilm, Brussels, 1991, page 71.

== Documentary broadcast on television ==
Personnalité à domicile : Éliane de Meuse interviewed by Éric Russon, Télé-Bruxelles, 1991
