= Suzanne Harvey =

American politician

Member of the New Hampshire House of Representatives
- In office 2014–2018
- Succeeded by: Paul Bergeron
- Constituency: Hillsborough 29

Member of the New Hampshire House of Representatives
- In office 2004–2010
- Constituency: Hillsborough 21

Personal details
- Party: Democratic

Suzanne Harvey is an American politician from New Hampshire. She served in the New Hampshire House of Representatives. She was the only Buddhist member.
