= Blonde Maze =

American music composer and producer

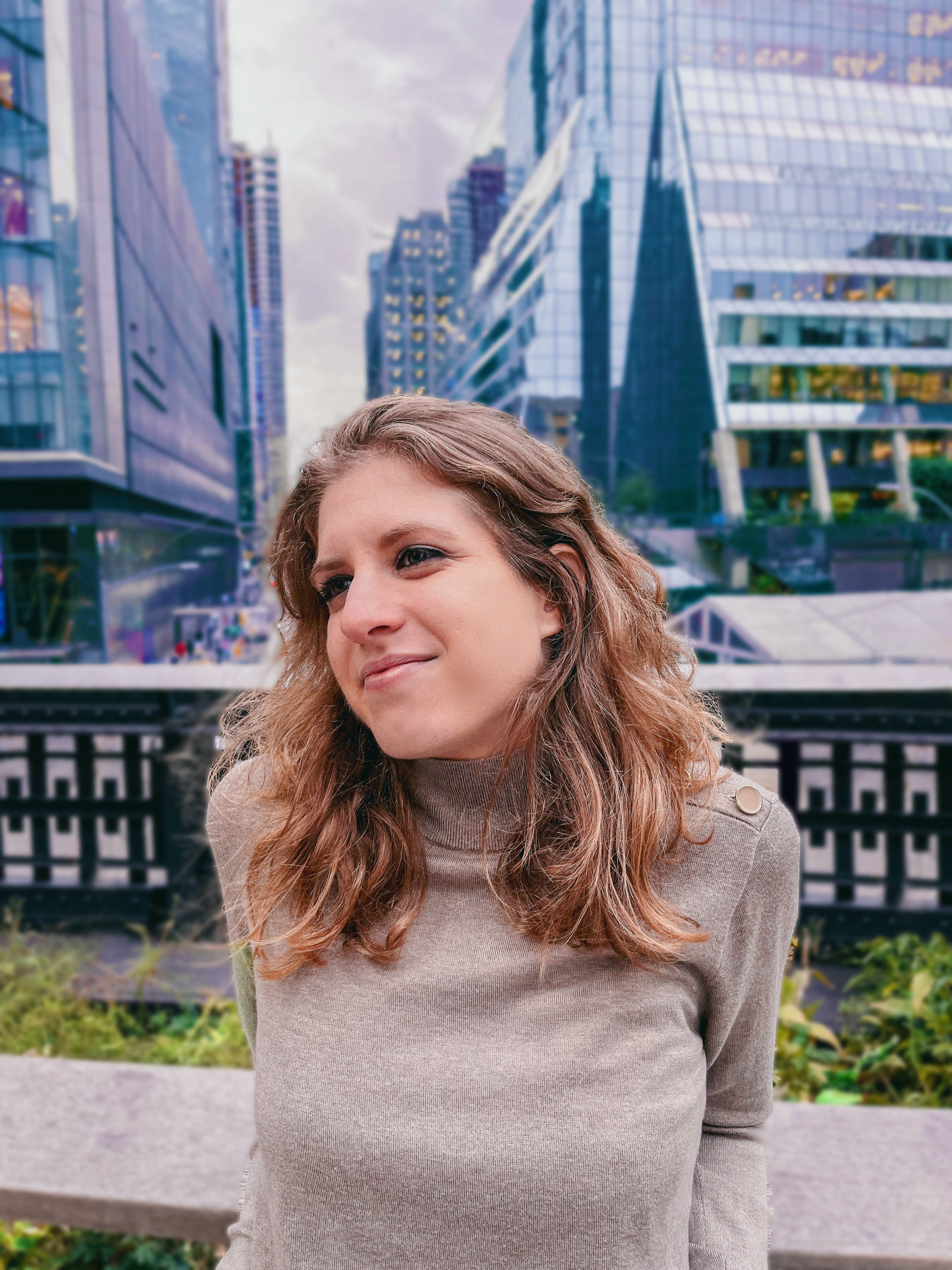

Background information
- Born: Amanda Steckler
- Genres: Electronic, dance
- Years active: 2015–present
- Spouse: Arianna Levesque

Amanda Steckler Levesque, professionally known by her stage name Blonde Maze is an American electronic music producer, composer and vocalist based in New York City. She is known for composing the entire original score for Demi Lovato's documentary Child Star.

== Career ==
Blonde Maze first began releasing music in 2015. In 2020, her single To the Moon gained notable success. "After the successful release of her song "Not All Flowers Bloom"...[To the Moon] broke the Apple Music Dance charts in over 50 territories, as well as garnering support on Today's Chill playlist on Apple Music and key radio adds to Sirius XM Chill."

In 2021, Blonde Maze released her debut Album Something Familiar. "After teaming up with labels Monstercat and Lowly, and with self-released single 'Antarctica' reaching Spotify's U.S. Viral 50 and seeing spins on BBC Radio 1, she released her debut album [Something Familiar] on Enhanced Chill in 2021 that consisted of glistening tracks and dreamy soundscapes, which received strong support from Sirius XM Chill."

Her cover of Fade Into You, originally by Mazzy Star, gained notable recognition after being featured in the hit shows Never Have I Ever (TV series) on Netflix and Love, Victor on Hulu.

Blonde Maze has opened shows for Sultan & Shepard, Haliene, Autograf, Tritonal, and Elderbrook. As an LGBT artist, Amanda has performed at both SXSW and NYC Pride. "Steckler quickly realized she could use her career to advocate for others with similar struggles. From being featured in Nylon, DJ Mag and Billboard Pride, she has consistently used her platform to raise awareness for LGBTQ+ communities. After years of what she describes as 'what she feared the most,' last year, Steckler got to proudly represent her community by playing Pride Fest at the NYC Pride event."

In 2023 Blonde Maze release her EP Another Color with label Enhanced Chill

== Personal life ==
Amanda is married to Arianna Levesque of the Levesque Triplets.
