= Adolphe Wansart =

Belgian artist, sculptor (1873–1954)

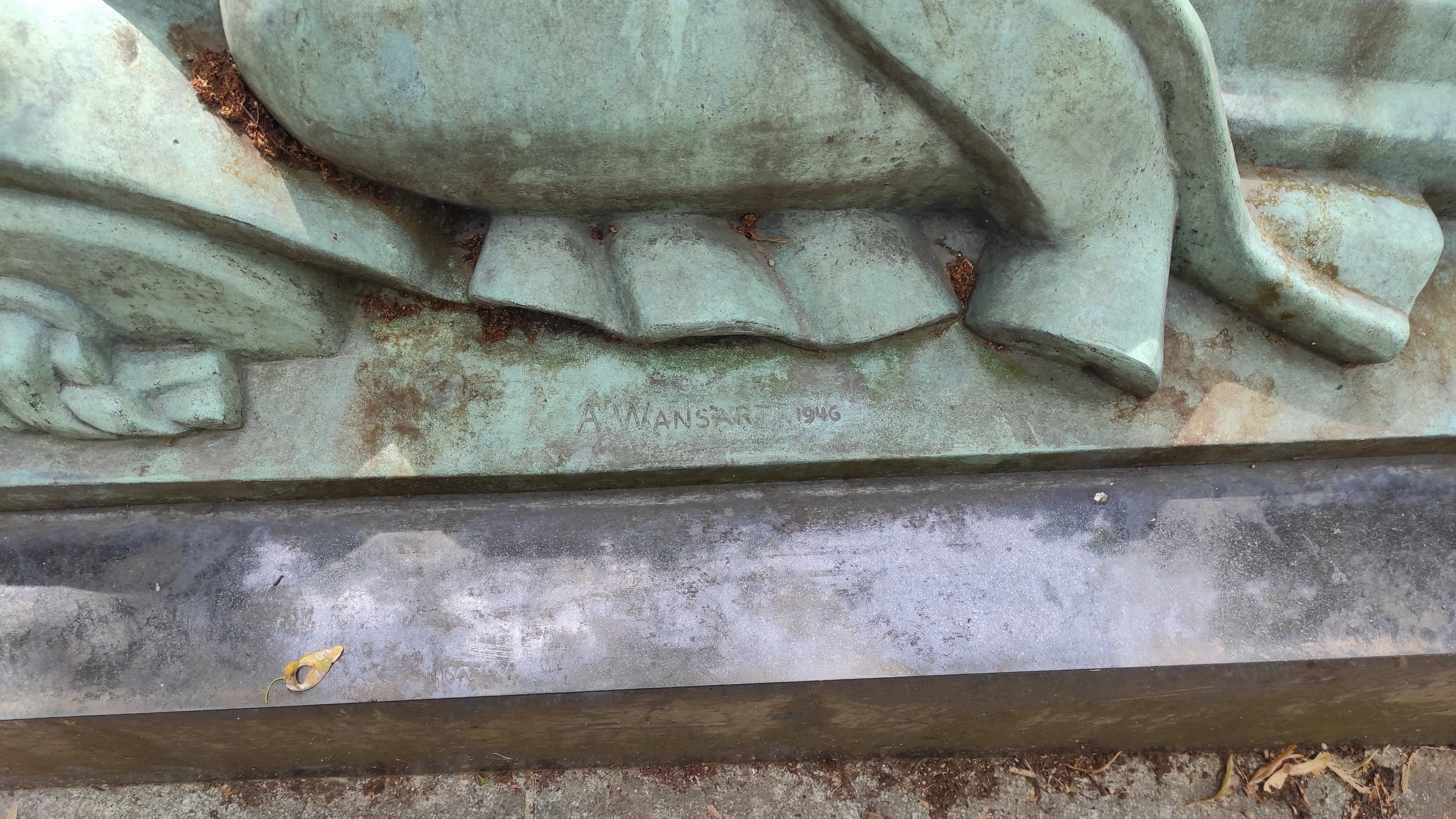
- Inscription by Wansart on the tomb of Fernand Arbelot
- Born: 18 October 1873; Verviers
- Died: 3 October 1954 (aged 80); Brussels
- Citizenship: Belgian
- Occupations: Painter, Sculptor, Medallist

Adolphe Wansart (October 18, 1873, in Verviers – October 3, 1954, in Brussels), was a Belgian painter and sculptor.

== Biography ==
Adolphe Wansart was the son of Brigadier Henri Guillaume Wansart and Henriette Marie Augustine Frazier. He received his education at the Academy of Liège. Recognizing his son's potential, his retired father decided to relocate the family to Brussels to further Adolphe's studies. Adolphe became a student of Jan Frans Portaels at the Royal Academy of Fine Arts in Brussels. He made his debut as a painter at the Brussels Salon in 1893, where he won the Godecharle Prize for his drawing "Wandering Souls." Adolphe eventually settled in Uccle.

Starting in 1897, Adolphe Wansart worked in the studio of Charles Van der Stappen at the Brussels Academy, where he increasingly focused on sculpture while continuing to draw and paint. He created busts, memorials, funerary monuments, medals, and reliefs. Henri Kerels' monograph on Wansart lists a total of 85 works: 68 monuments, compositions, and portraits, 13 medals, and 4 pieces of copperware. Wansart also sculpted several pieces featuring his wife, the artist Lucie Desmet (1873–1943), whom he met at the Brussels Academy. One notable work, a bust of Lucie exhibited in 1925 at the Ghent Triennial Exhibition, was praised by art critic Leo Van Puyvelde. He described Wansart as an artist "whose strong Portrait of his Wife is a magnificent example of the modern feeling for volume with solid surfaces and large lines, without too great a deviation from nature or too strict an attachment to reality." In 1927, Wansart moved with his wife and son, Eric, to Rueil-Malmaison, near Paris, while maintaining his studio in Uccle. He primarily designed in France but produced his works in Belgium.

His largest works were created for the city of Liège. The most notable is the 24-meter-long relief titled "Liège, Arts et Sciences," which adorns the entrance to the Palais des Fêtes, constructed for an international exhibition on water technology in 1939. This work is an allegorical representation of Liège, highlighting its industrial and cultural heritage. Another significant piece is a six-meter-high statue of a knight with a shield and sword (1948–50), carved from blue stone. This knight symbolizes the Burgundian Netherlands, one of the four historical periods depicted on either side of the Pont des Arches in Liège. Wansart died at the age of 80, and an avenue in Uccle was named in his honor.

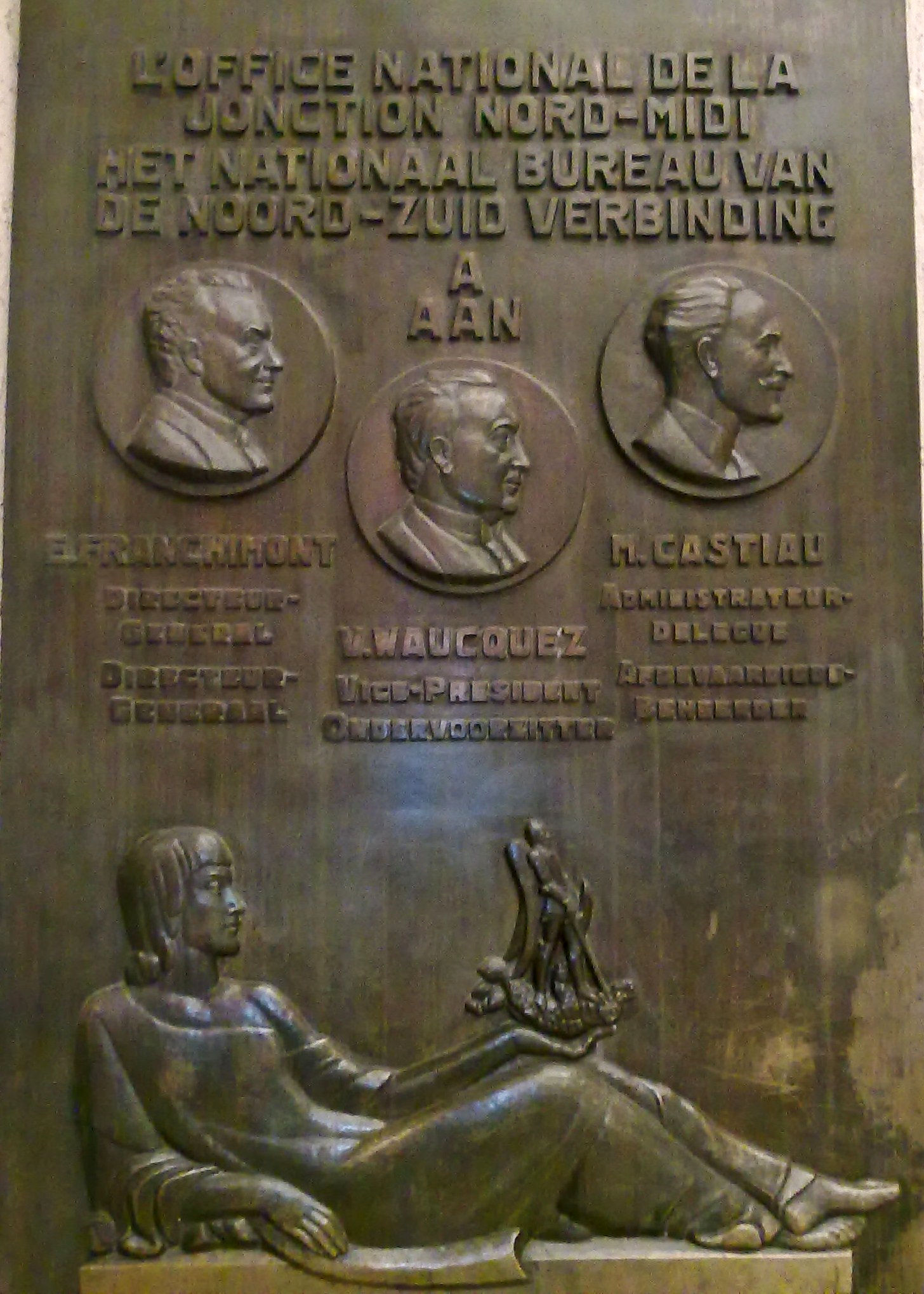
North–South connection in Brussels

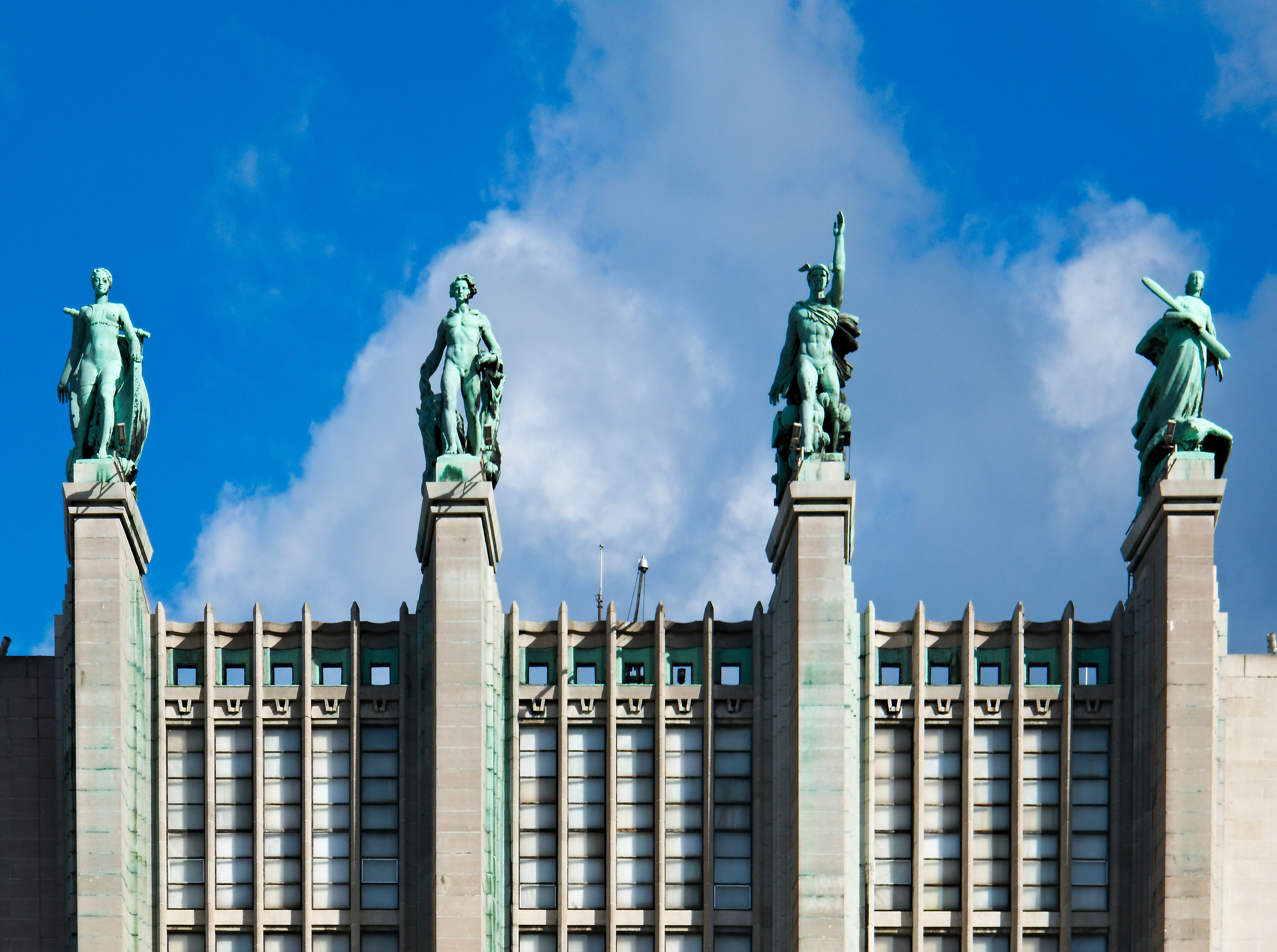
Expo Brussels

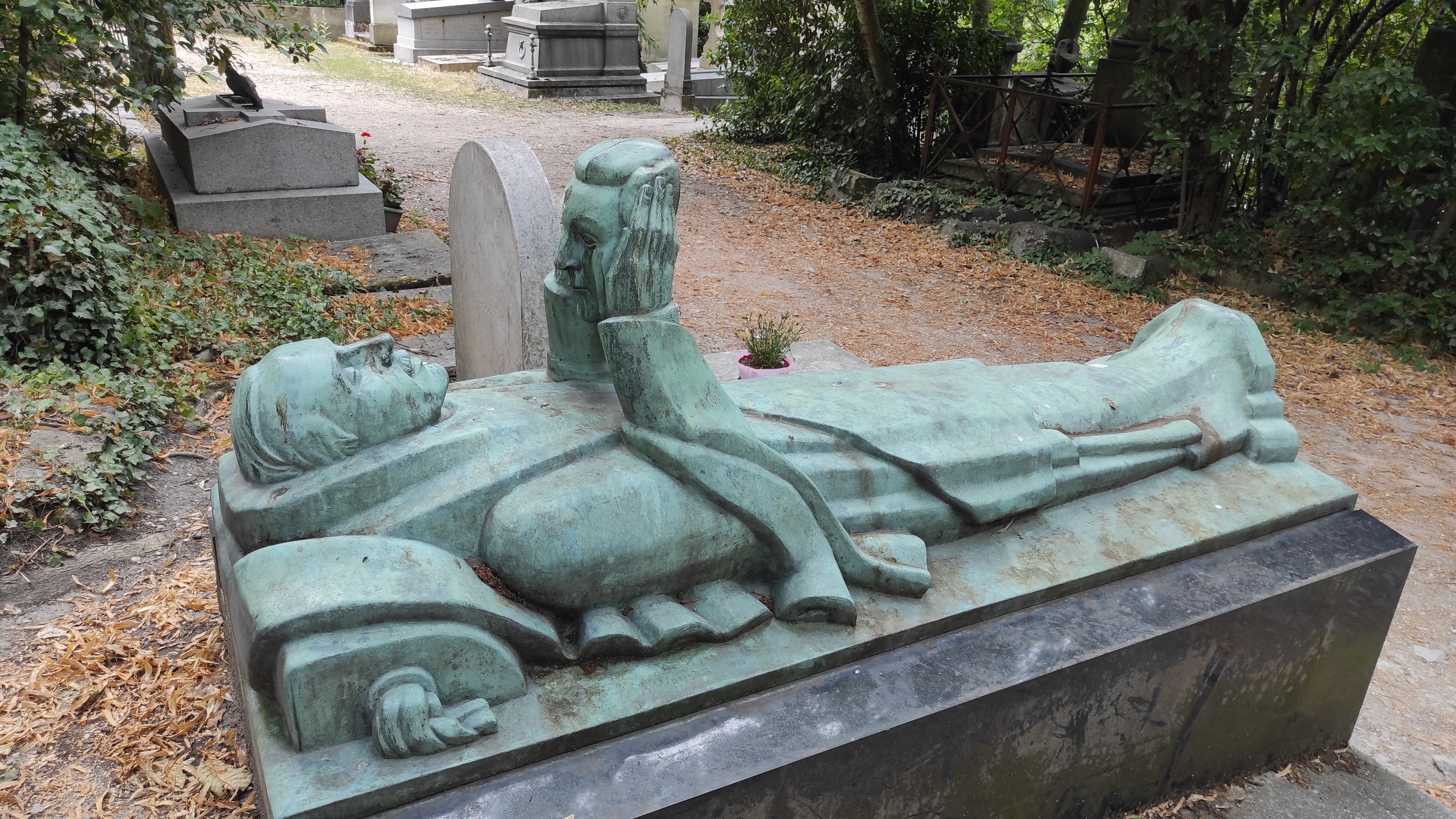
Grave of Arbelot (Père-Lachaise)

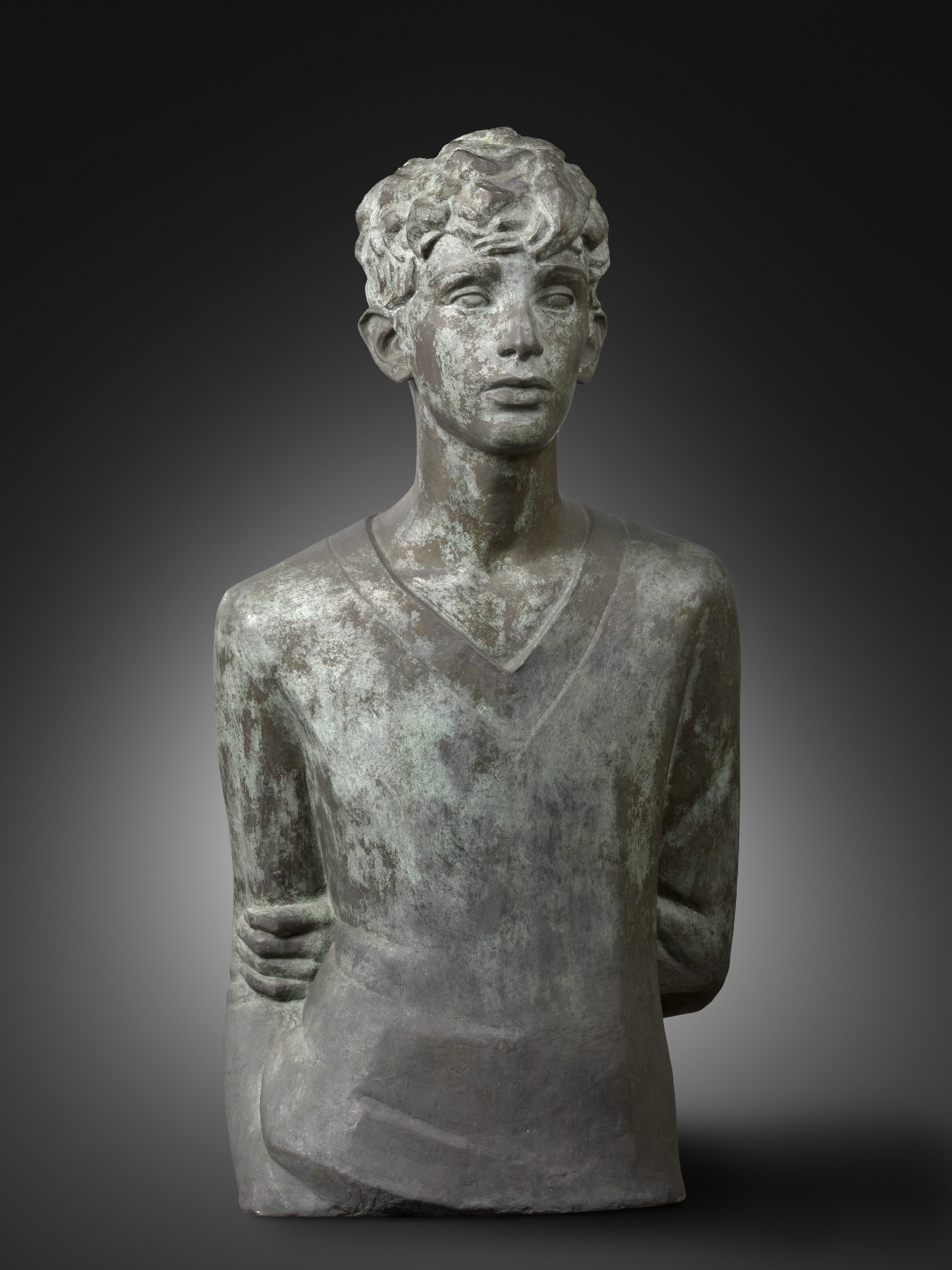
Sculpture of Claude Lyr

== Resources ==
- Serge Goyens de Heusch, L’impressionnisme et le fauvisme en Belgique, Anvers/Paris, Fonds Mercator/Albin Michel, 1988 ISBN 978-906153179-1
