= Christian Kieckens =

Belgian architect (1951–2020)

Belgian promotional poster (2016)

Christian Kieckens (24 January 1951 – 11 May 2020) was a Belgian architect and also photographer and lecturer.

Kieckens was born in Aalst. In 1974 he graduated from the Sint-Lucas School of Architecture in Ghent. He won de Godecharleprijs for Architecture (1981) and the Vlaamse Cultuurprijs for Architecture (1999).

From 2002 he had his own company, Christian Kieckens Architects, based in Brussels. He also taught at the Artesis Hogeschool Antwerpen. He died in Brussels.

== Works ==
- Students' center Maastricht
- Students' center Tilburg
- Bridge in Bruges
- Kortrijk Xpo
- Crematorium Zemst
- Publisher Sanderus, Oudenaarde ("indrukken uitdrukken")
- Architect museum
