= Child Star (film) =

2024 documentary film

- Promotional poster
- Directed by: Demi Lovato; Nicola Marsh
- Produced by: Michael D. Ratner; Scott Ratner; Miranda Sherman; Kfir Goldberg; Demi Lovato
- Starring: Demi Lovato; Christina Ricci; Raven-Symoné; Alyson Stoner; Drew Barrymore; JoJo Siwa; Kenan Thompson
- Edited by: Ron Eigen; Yaniv Elani
- Music by: Blonde Maze; Oak Felder
- Production companies: OBB Pictures; SB Projects; DLG
- Distributed by: Hulu
- Release date: September 17, 2024
- Running time: 97 minutes
- Country: United States
- Language: English

Child Star is a 2024 American documentary film directed by American singer Demi Lovato and American cinematographer Nicola Marsh. The film centers on the subject of the tribulations of experiencing child stardom, fame, and working in the entertainment industry at a young age. It stars actresses Lovato, Drew Barrymore, JoJo Siwa, Raven-Symoné, Christina Ricci, Kenan Thompson, and Alyson Stoner. The film was promoted by the release of the song "You'll Be OK, Kid", performed by Lovato. The original score for the documentary was composed by Blonde Maze. The film was nominated for Favorite On Screen at the 2025 iHeartRadio Music Awards.

== Plot ==
Child Star opens with a group of children who answer questions regarding their aspirations, the meaning of fame, and how being on camera makes them feel. The film delves into the historical background and economic importance of child stardom in the United States, dating back to silent film actor Jackie Coogan and Shirley Temple. The film interweaves this historical context with discussions between Lovato and other former child performers including Drew Barrymore, JoJo Siwa, Raven-Symoné, Christina Ricci, Alyson Stoner, and Kenan Thompson, regarding their personal journeys and experiences with fame as children. Chris Columbus, who produced Home Alone and the first two Harry Potter movies, also participates in the film sharing details about castings and the impact that fame has on the lives of young actors. Throughout Child Star, Lovato also shares her own life experiences as a former child actor on Barney & Friends and as a singer and actor on Disney Channel. The film features Lovato's conversations with her family, including sister Madison De La Garza, who starred on Desperate Housewives. Towards the end of the film, Lovato meets with aspiring child actors who ask her personal questions. The film ends with sessions of her in the studio writing and recording "You'll Be OK, Kid".

== Production ==
The production of Child Star, the American singer and actor Demi Lovato's directorial debut, was announced in March 2023. In an interview with magazine Billboard in December 2023, Demi Lovato expressed her excitement for the project, and stated: "I'm having some deep and meaningful conversations with people that obviously were child stars previously". On July 31, 2024, The Hollywood Reporter revealed the release date of the documentary, September 17, and the former child actors that would be appearing, including Drew Barrymore, Kenan Thompson, Christina Ricci, Raven-Symoné, JoJo Siwa, and Lovato's Camp Rock co-star Alyson Stoner. In a press statement about the film, Lovato said: "There is no better film or topic for my directorial debut than this story, which is close to home". It was produced by OBB Media' Michael D. Ratner, Scott Ratner, Miranda Sherman, Kfir Goldberg, and Lovato. It was executive produced by Marsh, Scooter Braun, Scott Manson, Jen McDaniels, and James Shin, while Glenn Stickley served as a co-executive producer.

== Marketing ==
The official trailer for the documentary film was released on September 5, 2024. In promotion of Child Star, Lovato released the song "You'll Be OK, Kid" on September 13, 2024, through Island Records. It was written and recorded exclusively for the film. During an interview with Good Morning America on September 18, 2024, Lovato said her motivation underlying the film is to explore "why people get into the industry at such a young age" and "how it affects us", as well as the sharing the history of child stars "dating back to Shirley Temple and Jackie Coogan". Lovato also shared that dissociation was a common thread between all of the child stars, as there were "chunks of time and memories and projects that we don't remember working on, which was really fascinating to me".

== Accolades ==
Award	Year	Category	Result	Ref.
iHeartRadio Music Awards	2025	Favorite On Screen	Nominated	
