= Auguste Levêque =

Belgian painter

- Born: c. 1866; Nivelles, Belgium
- Died: c. 1921; Saint-Josse-ten-Noode, Belgium
- Education: Académie Royale des Beaux-Arts in Brussels
- Occupation: Painter

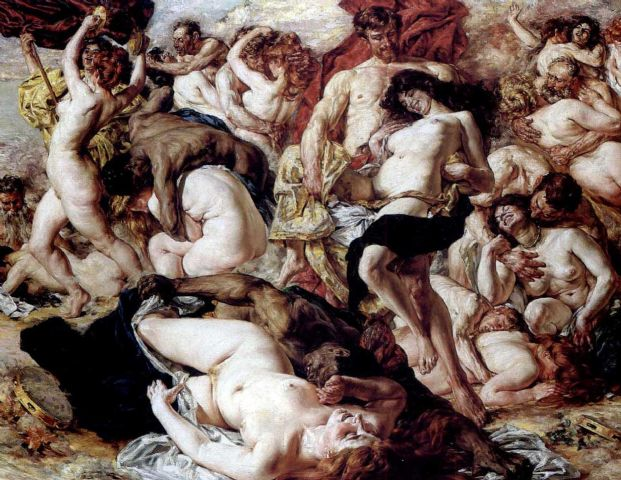
Bacchanalia, oil on canvas

Auguste Levêque (1866–1921) was a Belgian painter influenced both by realism and symbolism. Levêque was also a sculptor, poet and art theoretician.

Levêque was born in Nivelles, Walloon Brabant. He studied under Jean-François Portaels at the Académie Royale des Beaux-Arts in Brussels, and received the Prix Godecharle for his painting Job in 1890.

Levêque was a member of the "Salon d'Art Idéaliste", formed by Jean Delville in Brussels in 1896, which is considered the Belgian equivalent to the Parisian Rose & Cross Salon. Other members of the group were Léon Frédéric, Albert Ciamberlani, Constant Montald, Emile Motte, Victor Rousseau, Armand Point and Alexandre Séon. The Salon was abandoned in 1898. He died in Saint-Josse-ten-Noode.

== Notable paintings ==
- Job
- Les Dentelles d'airain
- Panthéra et Vipérena
- Mater dolorosa
- Circé
- Dante
- Parque
- Repos
- Ouvriers tragiques
- Triomphe de la Mort
- Moisson future
- Hymne d'Amour
- Repos de Diane
- Combat de Centaures
- Portrait d'Edmond Picard (I)
- Portrait d'Edmond Picard (II)

== Notable sculptures ==
- Fin de Sodome
- Triomphe de la Vigne
- Combat d'amazones
- Vision païenne

== Gallery ==
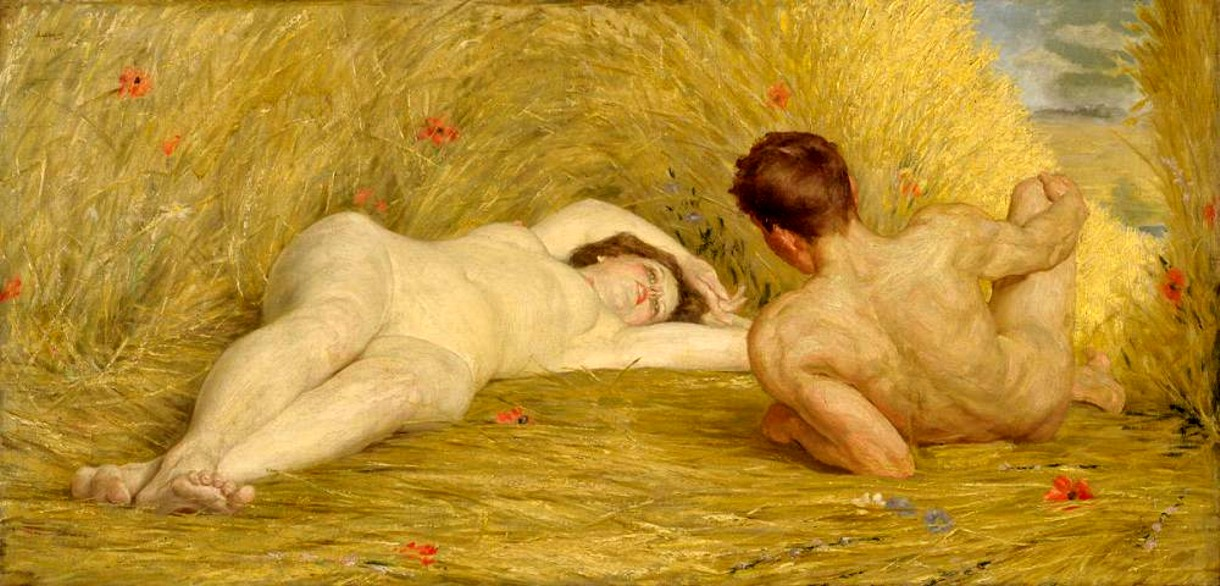
Lovers, 1918

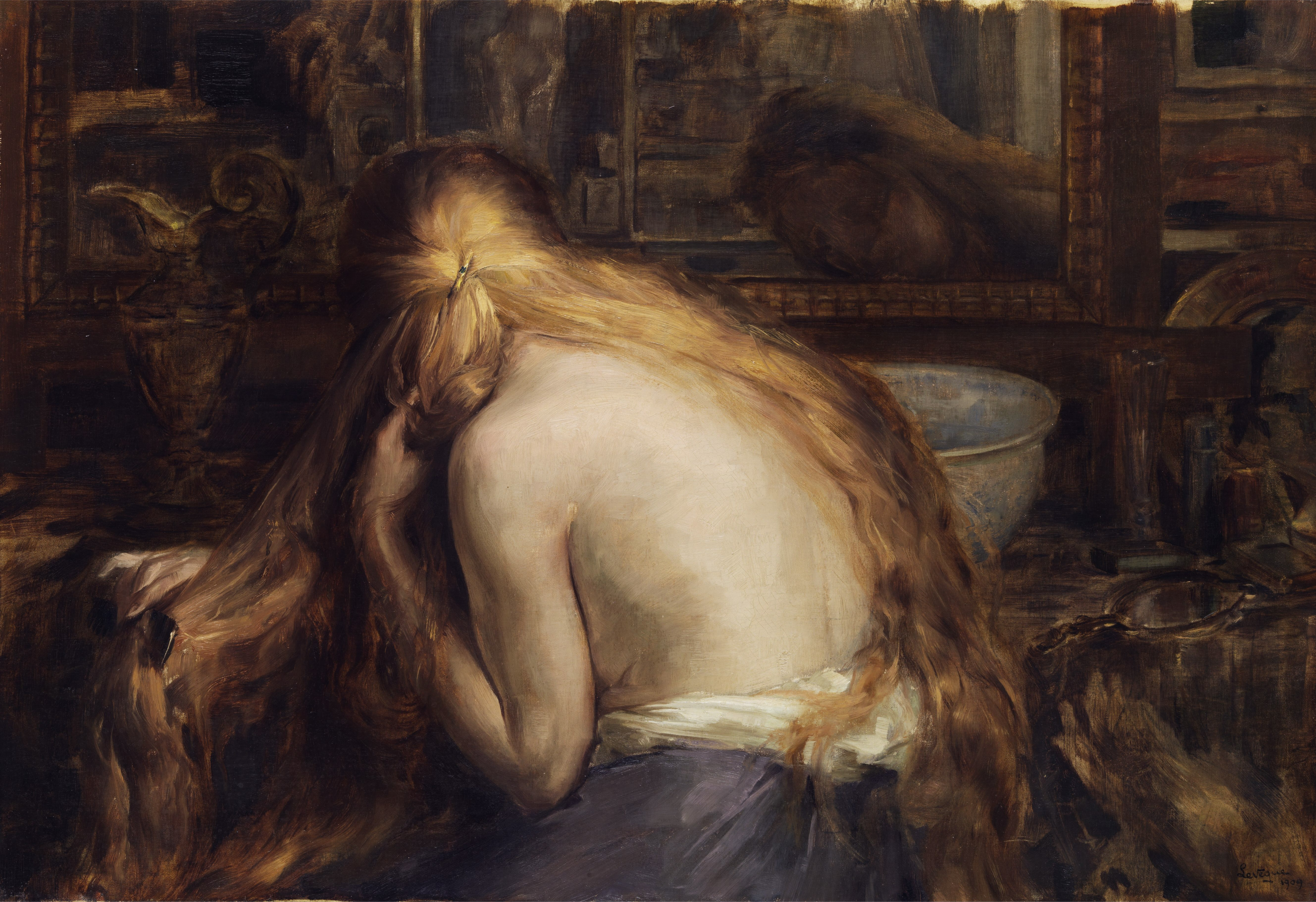
Hymn to women, 1909

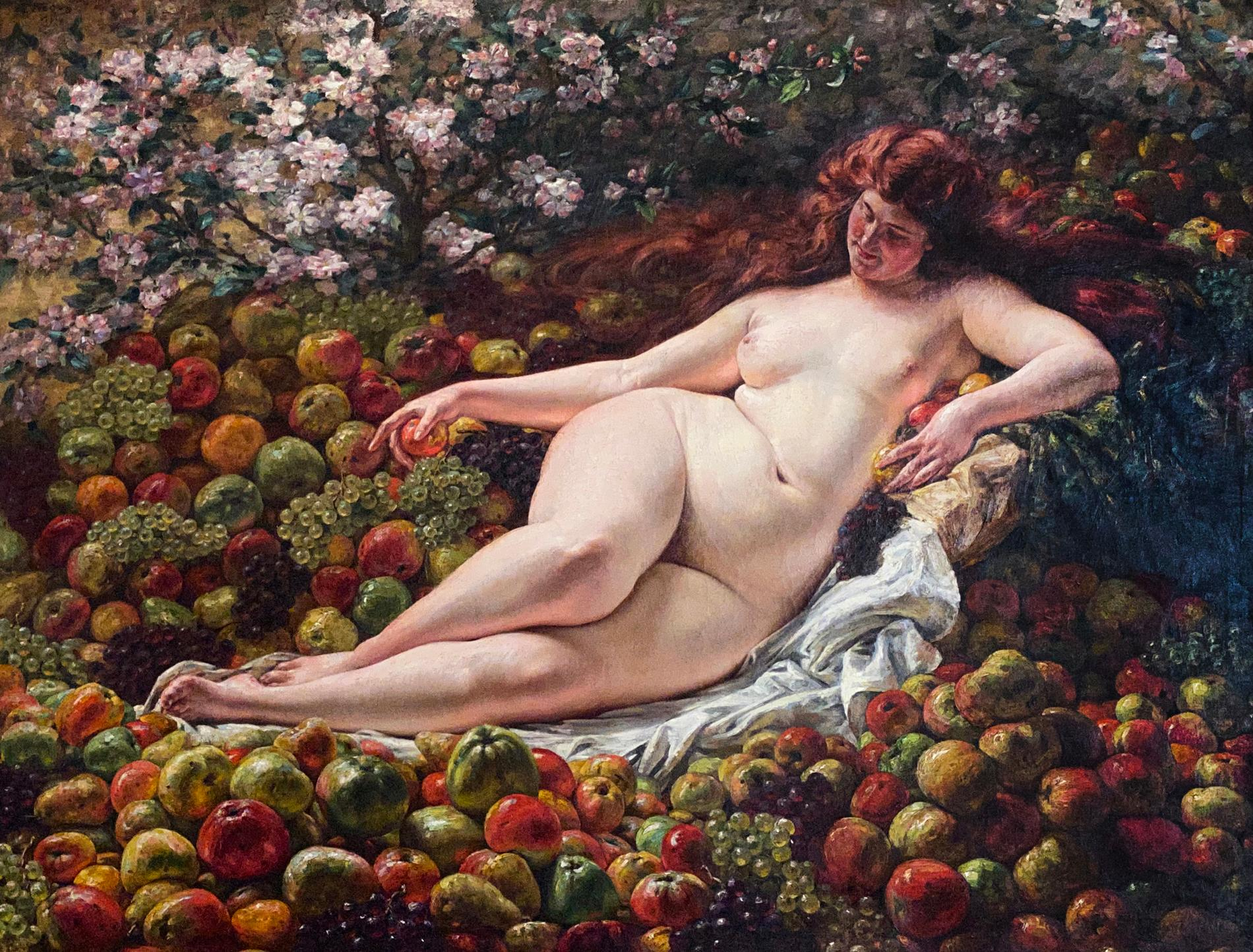
Pomone, 1904

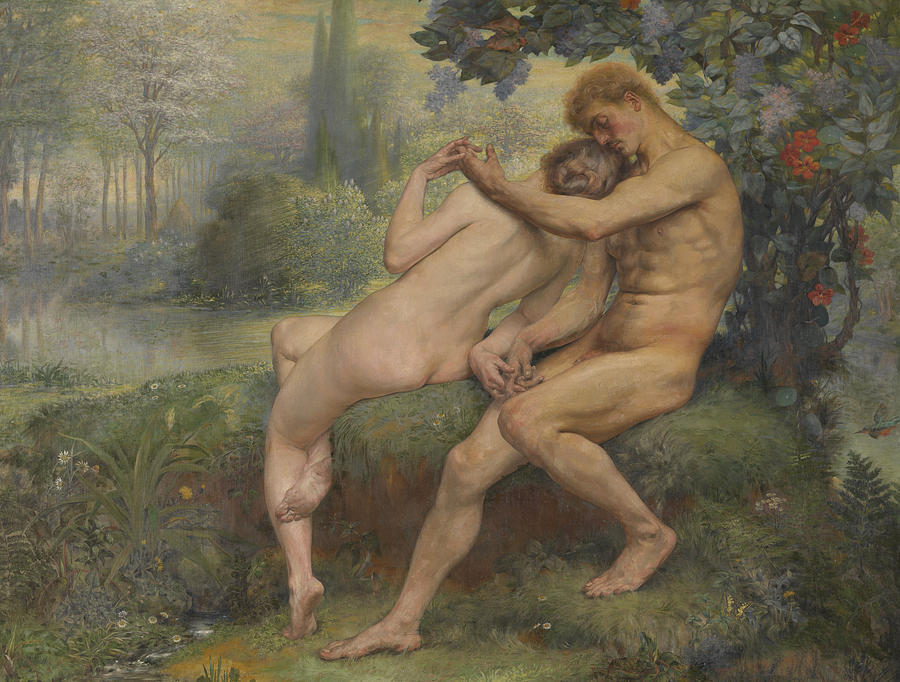
Love Hymn, 1921

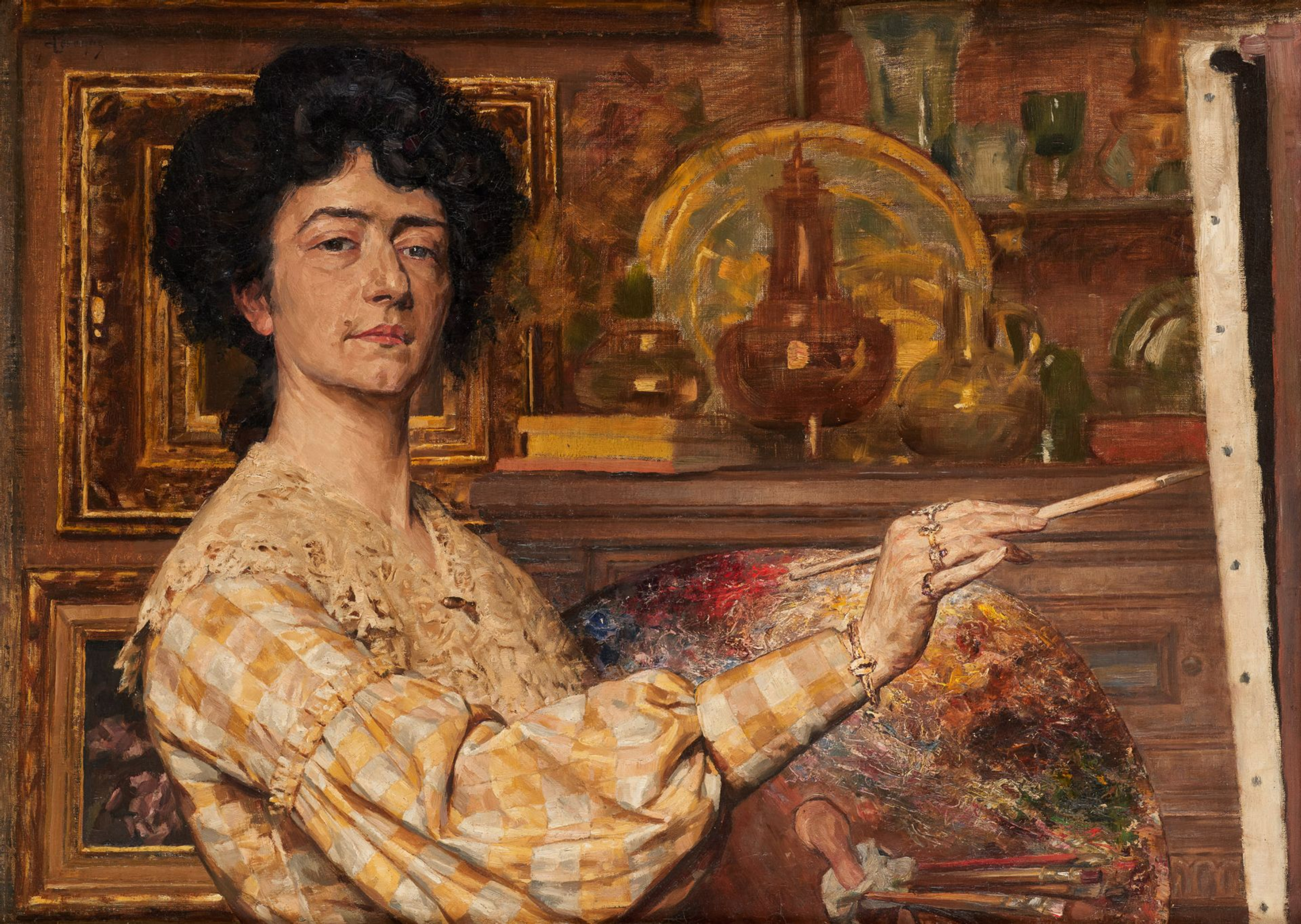
Painter at the easel

== Sources ==
- P. & V. Berko, "Dictionary of Belgian painters born between 1750 & 1875", Knokke 1981, pp. 422–423.
