= Paul Bergeron =

American politician

Member of the New Hampshire House of Representatives
- In office December 5, 2018 – December 7, 2022
- Preceded by: Suzanne Harvey
- Constituency: Rockingham 29

Personal details
- Party: Democratic
- Education: University of New Hampshire

Paul R. Bergeron is an American politician from New Hampshire. He served in the New Hampshire House of Representatives. He previously served from 1973 to 1974, after overturning Republican brief incumbent Robert P. Levesque's win from the Hillsborough 14th district.
