= Journal of Youth and Adolescence =

- Discipline: Adolescence, pediatrics, child psychology
- Language: English
- Edited by: Roger J.R. Levesque

Publication details
- History: 1972–present
- Publisher: Springer Science+Business Media
- Frequency: 10/year
- Impact factor: 3.284 (2016)

Standard abbreviations
- ISO 4: J. Youth Adolesc.

Indexing
- CODEN: JYADA6
- ISSN: 0047-2891 (print); 1573-6601 (web)

Links
- Journal homepage; Online access

The Journal of Youth and Adolescence is a peer-reviewed multidisciplinary academic journal covering all aspects of youth and adolescence, including psychology and criminology. It was established in 1972 and is published 10 times per year by Springer Science+Business Media. The editor-in-chief is Roger J. R. Levesque (Indiana University). According to the Journal Citation Reports, the journal has a 2016 impact factor of 3.284.
