= Alfred Bastien =

Belgian painter (1873–1955)

Alfred Bastien working on "Panorama du Congo", in his studio.

Alfred Théodore Joseph Bastien (16 September 1873 in Ixelles – 7 June 1955 in Uccle) was a Belgian artist, academic, and soldier.

He attended the Académie Royale des Beaux-Arts in Ghent, where he studied with Jean Delvin. He then enrolled in the Académie Royale des Beaux-Arts in Brussels, where he studied with Jean-François Portaels. He won the Prix Godecharle there in 1897. He traveled to Paris, where he enrolled in the École des Beaux-Arts in Paris. He was in Paris when hostilities broke out in what would become the First World War.

== War Artist ==
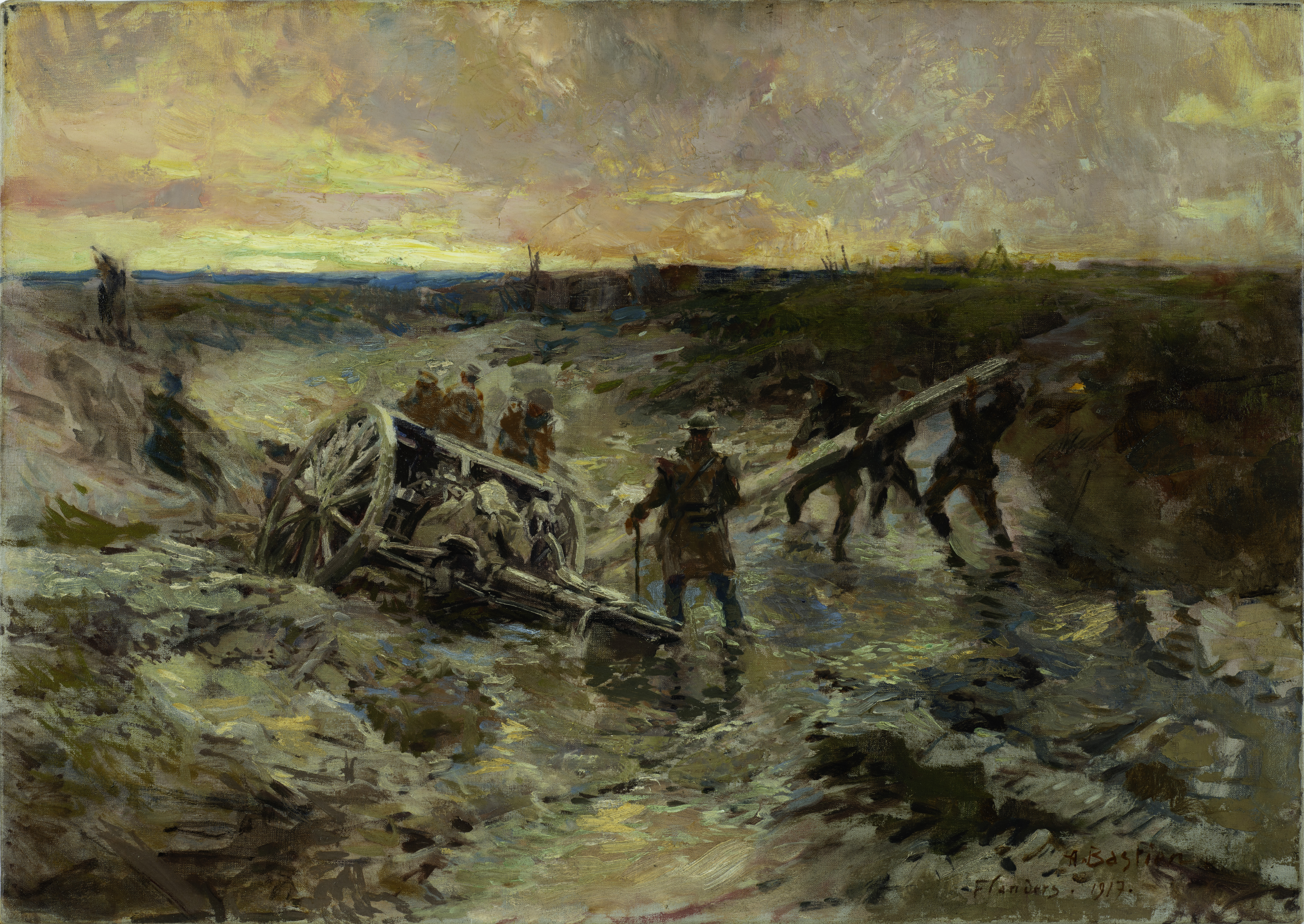
Alfred Bastien. Canadian Gunners in the Mud, Passchendaele, 1917

In July/August 1918, Lieutenant Bastien was attached as a war artist to the Canadian 22nd Battalion.Some of the work he created in this period is part of the Beaverbrook Collection of War Art at the Canadian War Museum in Ottawa.

In the Belgian Army, after serving in the 'Garde Civique' like many other Belgians, Bastien fled to Great Britain after the fall of Antwerp in October 1914 and despite his age (43) volunteered for the Belgian Army. He was eventually transferred to the 'Section Artistique' in Nieuwpoort along with many of his pre-war artist friends and acquaintances. From 1915 onwards, he made many drawings and sketches of the situation on and behind the Belgian lines on the Yser river. The British war-time magazine 'the Illustrated War News', among others, regularly published his work, quite often in distinctive and semi-panoramic, multi-color two-page spreads. In 1917, on personal request by Lord Beaverbrook who owned several of Bastien's pre-war paintings, he was seconded to the Canadian Army until September 1918, during which time he produced many works of art specifically related to the Canadian war experience.

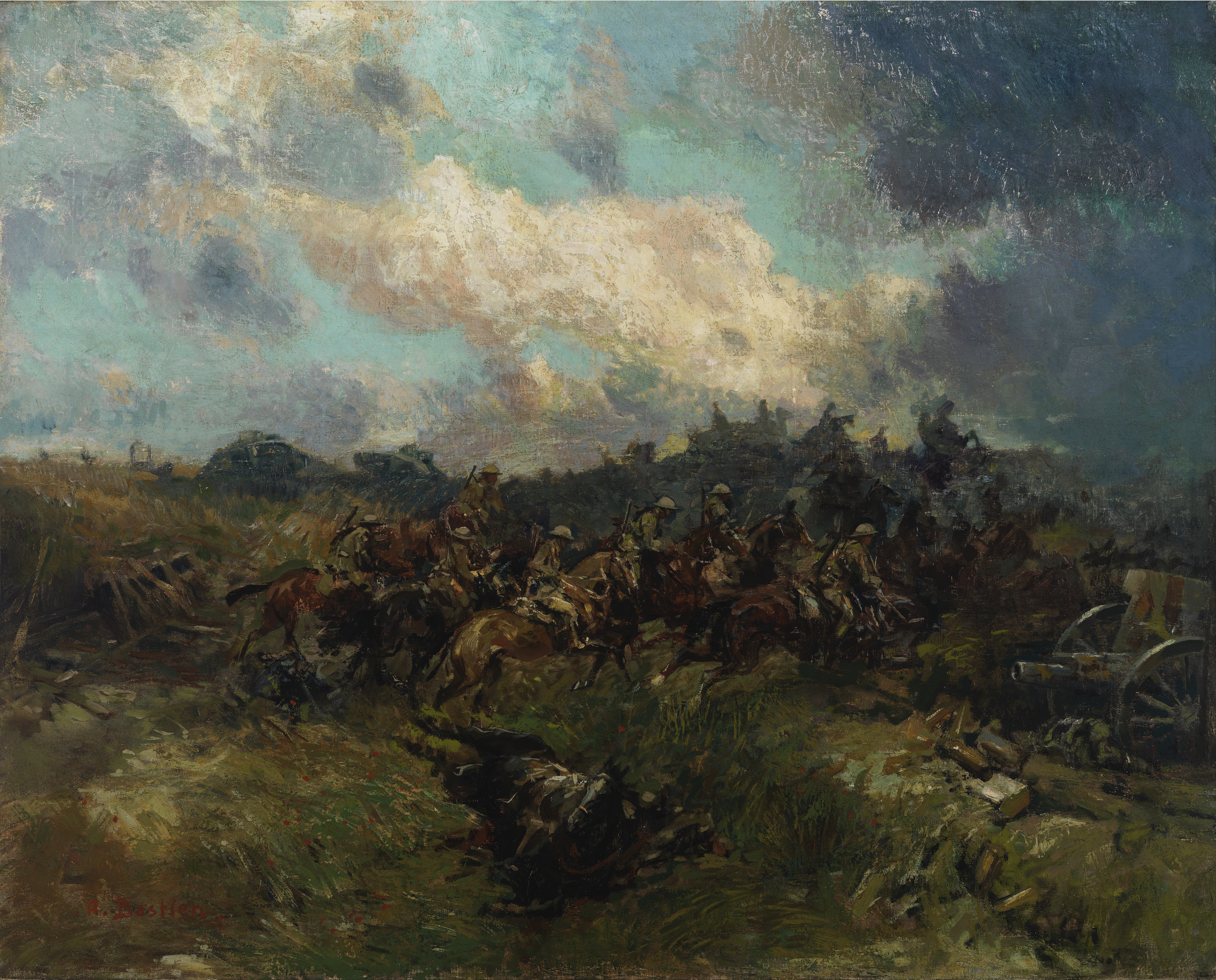
Cavalry and Tanks at Arras

After the war, Alfred Bastien painted a grand Panorama of the Yser Front in 19th century tradition, a project which he had been planning since 1914 and which, according to his own telling, had been suggested to him by King Albert in 1914. During his war-time service in the Belgian Army, Bastien made many sketches, drawings and photos which were later either incorporated into the Panorama itself or were useful studies in technique and effects. The 'Panorama de l'Yser' painting itself measured 115 meters in length and 14 meters in height and was initially exhibited in Brussels. In the mid 1920s, a permanent building was constructed in Ostend, Belgium to house the Panorama along with a multitude of props and decor. The intention of moving the Panorama to Ostend was to capture a share of British war-tourism, since most British coming to visit relatives' war graves arrived by steamer in Ostend before proceeding to the area of the Ypres Salient. The Panorama opened at Ostend in 1926.

Financially the Panorama was great success, both for Bastien who received a tremendous fee for the painting, for the consortium of businessmen and banks which provided funds and capital and for the city of Ostend which provided real estate and a newly constructed building to house the Panorama. The initial investment was repaid many times over, from entrance fees and from (by modern standards) modest merchandising of postcards and prints. To give a relative idea of the finances involved, the actual cost of the painting materials (oil paint, linnen, brushes etc.) was estimated at around 40 000 BF, the cost to construct the new building at Ostend was 550 000 BF and Bastien's fee itself was set at 350 000 BF. Entrance fees for customers was 3 BF. While on exhibition in Brussels until 1925 it is estimated that more than 800 000 customers visited the Panorama, amongst them many of the crowned heads of Europe, presidents and foreign emperors alike, all to great acclaim by the news-media.

In completing a work of such dimensions it is obvious that Bastien could not do all the painting himself. Several of his war-time friends and fellow artists from the 'Section Artistique' participated in this grand project. The initial sketching in of the broad outline in charcoal of the Panorama took about a week's time to complete, while the actual painting and varnishing took one year's time. The Panorama was set up in a circle, with paying spectators having a viewing place in the center. Careful attention was given to the lighting effects and the placement of objects in the foreground, in order to create a more believable optical illusion.

Aside from his most famous 'Panorama de l'Yser', exhibited in Brussels, Bastien also created a smaller sized 'Panorama de la Bataille de la Meuse' in 1937 which showed an amalgam of scenes from the fighting in Namur and the Citadel of Dinant during August 1914. Part of this panorama which depicted the massacre of Belgian civilians in Dinant in August 1914, was deliberately destroyed by German authorities during the 1940–44 occupation.

The 'Panorama de l'Yser' was heavily damaged in 1940 during a bombing raid by British aircraft. The museum was closed during the war years and the painting was exposed to all manner of adverse weather conditions. In 1951 the work was moved into the Royal Army Museum in Brussels where a preliminary restoration was undertaken. Afterwards it was exhibited in the Army Museum until 1980. Subsequently, the painting has remained in storage, awaiting further restoration and a definitive destination.

== Honours ==
- 1919 : Grand officer in the Order of Leopold.
- 1945 : Member of the Royal Academy of Science, Letters and Fine Arts of Belgium.

== Career ==
A. Bastien served from 1927 to 1945 as Professor of the Class of Painting after Nature ("Peinture d'après Nature", in French) at Brussels'Royal Academy of Fine Arts. He ensured the interim (1932–1933) of the Class of Landscape Painting ("Paysage") after the death of Professor Paul Mathieu, and before his replacement by Frans Smeers (1933–1946). He also held the Directorship of this institution at three occasions: from October 1928 to Januari 1929, from June 1929 to October 1930, and a three-year mandate from September 1935 to September 1938.

Among his students was Wu Zuoren (Wu Tso-jen), who would become head of the China Central Academy of Fine Arts in Beijing.

== See also ==
- Canadian official war artists
- War artist
- War art
