= Roger J.R. Levesque =

- Born: October 17, 1963 (age 62)
- Education: University of Chicago (Ph.D., 1990), Columbia University (J.D., 1993)
- Awards: 2009 American Psychology–Law Society Outstanding Book Award
- Scientific career
- Fields: Criminology, law, psychology
- Institutions: Indiana University
- Thesis: Adolescents in love: an exploration of adolescent love experiences across and within five socio-cultural groups (1990)

Roger J.R. Levesque (born October 17, 1963) is professor in the Department of Criminal Justice at Indiana University, as well as an affiliated professor of law in the Indiana University Maurer School of Law. He is the editor-in-chief of the Journal of Youth and Adolescence, New Criminal Law Review, and Adolescent Research Review. He is a fellow of the Association for Psychological Science, the American Psychological Association, the American Psychology–Law Society, and the Society for the Psychological Study of Social Issues.

In 2016, Levesque was editor for Adolescents, Rapid Social Change, and the Law: The Transforming Nature of Protection.
