= Crystal Levesque =

Canadian animal scientist and nutritionist

Crystal Levesque is a Canadian animal scientist and monogastric nutritionist who is the inaugural Rick Wahlstrom Endowed Chair in Swine Production at South Dakota State University.

== Life ==
Levesque grew up on a broiler and mixed small-grain farm in central Saskatchewan, where she developed an interest in livestock production and the value of research for improving animal agriculture. She earned bachelor’s and master’s degrees in animal science from the University of Saskatchewan. Levesque completed a Ph.D. in nutrition and metabolism at the University of Alberta, with research focused on amino-acid metabolism during pregnancy. After her doctorate she undertook postdoctoral training at the Prairie Swine Center at the University of Guelph.

Levesque has been a faculty member at South Dakota State University since 2013 and holds the rank of professor of monogastric nutrition. Her research program centers on three main areas, maternal nutrient use and requirements during pregnancy and lactation to improve piglet development, evaluation of alternative feed ingredients and dietary additives to support piglet health after weaning, and the application of advanced feed technologies to enhance efficient growth in broilers and turkeys. She conducts collaborative work that uses the pig as a model for human health. In 2026, Levesque was named the inaugural Rick Wahlstrom Endowed Chair in Swine Production. The position honors Rick Wahlstrom, whose long career at SDSU helped establish the university as a leading center for swine research and teaching.
