= Alice Lemieux-Lévesque =

Canadian poet and writer

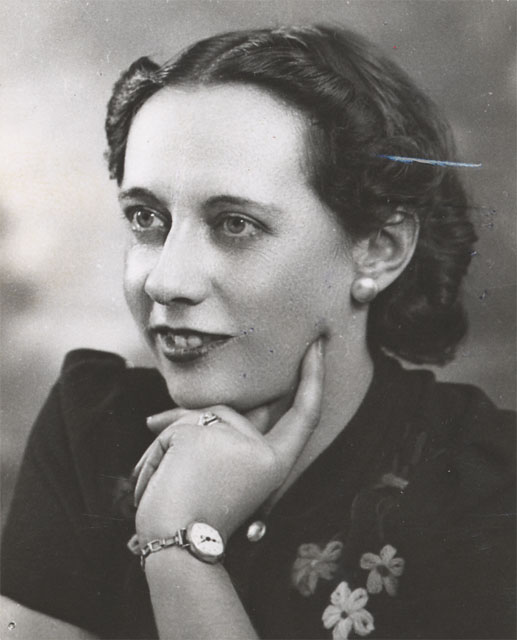
- Occupation: Writer
- Awards: Ordre des Palmes Académiques (1960)

Alice Lemieux-Lévesque (September 23, 1905 – January 1983) was a Canadian-American writer. She published multiple books. In 1960, she was awarded the Ordre des Palmes Académiques, a national order of France, for her work in improving French-American relations.

== Biography ==
=== Early life and education ===
Lemieux-Lévesque was born in Quebec City, Quebec on September 23, 1905. Her parents were J. Albert Lemieux, a merchant, and Alice Morrisette. She grew up in Saint-Michel de Bellechase, attending primary school there, and completed high school at Convent des Ursulines de Québec. She then attended nursing school at Prévost de Montréal.

=== Career and personal life ===
In 1926, she published Heures effeuillées, a poetry collection. In 1962, she published a second poetry collection, Poèmes. The collection won a David Prize. In 1930, Lemieux-Lévesque spent a year studying at the Sorbonne in Paris.

After returning to Canada, in 1935, Lemieux-Lévesque married Léo-Albert Lévesque, a French-American journalist and poet, who was better known under the pseudonym Rosaire Dion-Lévesque. After the wedding, Lemieux-Lévesque moved to Nashua, New Hampshire. In the United States, she advocated for the promotion of French culture and heritage among French Americans. She edited Nashua's French-language journal, L'impartial, from 1946 to 1951 and served as the French-American Women's Federation's first president. In 1952, she founded the organization's Bulletin publication, which would go on to be known as one of the "best French-language publications in the United States." In 1960, a French representative in Boston awarded her the Ordre des Palmes Académiques to recognize her for her work in improving French-American relations.

Lemieux-Lévesque published six other poetry collections: Silences in 1962, L'arbre du jour in 1964, Jardin d'octobre in 1972, Le repas du soir in 1974, Vers la joie in 1976, and Fleurs de givre in 1979. In 1963, Lemieux-Lévesque divorced her husband and returned to Canada. There, she published work in magazines and newspapers and was affiliated with the Society of French-Canadian Poets and the Society of Canadian Writers.
