= Moe Levesque =

Canadian football player (born 1937)

Profile
- Positions: Guard, Tackle

Personal information
- Born: July 28, 1937 (age 89); Ottawa, Ontario, Canada
- Listed height: 6 ft 2 in (1.88 m)
- Listed weight: 240 lb (109 kg)

Career history
- 1963–1965: Montreal Alouettes
- 1966: Saskatchewan Roughriders
- 1967: Ottawa Rough Riders

Awards and highlights
- Grey Cup champion (1966)

Maurice (Moe) Levesque (born July 28, 1938) was a Canadian football player who played for the Saskatchewan Roughriders, Montreal Alouettes, and Ottawa Rough Riders. He won the Grey Cup with Saskatchewan in 1966. He previously played football on the Halifax Navy team.
