= Max Van Dyck =

Belgian painter

- Born: Max Van Dyck; 23 December 1902; Brussels (Schaerbeek), Belgium
- Died: 26 December 1992 (aged 90); Brussels (Ixelles), Belgium
- Education: Académie Royale des Beaux-Arts, Brussels from 1916 to 1920 – inscription number 18754
- Known for: Painting and Music (Violinist)
- Awards: Prix de Rome (Belgium) 1920 when he was seventeen

Max Constant Armand Van Dyck (23 December 1902 – 26 December 1992) was a Belgian painter. He won the Belgian Prix de Rome in 1920. He married Éliane de Meuse in 1922. They attended together the courses of the same professors at the Académie Royale des Beaux-Arts, Brussels.
