= Levesque triplets =

American identical triplet models and actresses

The Levesque Triplets are identical triplets named Andrea Levesque, Athena Levesque, and Arianna Steckler Levesque. They are models, TV personalities and actresses.

== Career ==
They are recognized by their TV segments on shows such as MTV, The Drew Barrymore Show, Good Morning America, and The Dr. Oz Show, and for walking as models during New York Fashion Week. For their second segment on Good Morning America, the triplets modeled makeup looks by celebrity makeup artist Mario Dedivanovic, Kim Kardashian's makeup artist. The triplets modeled looks styled by Hayley Hasselhoff on Strahan, Sara and Keke in December 2019.

The sisters were featured as "singing triplets" in the horror film Halloween Kills, released in October 2021.

Andrea, Arianna and Athena have participated in various dating segments including May the Best Twin Win for MTV, the reboot of Singled Out (also on MTV), and Bestie Picks Bae for Seventeen.

The triplets modeled gowns styled by Hollywood stylists for E! Live from the Red Carpet Countdown to the Oscars in 2018. The design segment required identical models to create Wonder Woman–inspired red carpet looks.

Andrea Levesque is a sapphic mystery author and voice actress. In 2021 she published two books in her Rose and Compass series, There Can Only Be Six, and its sequel, There Can Only Be Blood. The third installment in the series, There Can Only Be Secrets, was released in 2022.

== Early life ==
Arianna has a degree in Fashion Design from the Fashion Institute of Technology. Andrea has a Master's degree in Psychology from Tufts University. Athena has a Master's in Education from the University of Massachusetts Amherst.

== March of Dimes involvement ==
Andrea, Arianna and Athena have been actively volunteering with the March of Dimes since they were born. At 4 years old they served as ambassadors for the March of Dimes and continued volunteering with them as they got older.

"The Levesques’ first taste of life in the public eye actually came about years before that, when they had just turned 4 years old and were selected as March of Dimes ambassadors.

[T]he triplets benefited from life-saving treatments developed by the March of Dimes.

As preschoolers, they participated in a March of Dimes telethon and appeared at fundraiser walks."

== Present Day ==
In 2023 Arianna married Amanda Steckler Levesque, formerly Amanda Steckler, a music producer who goes by the stage name Blonde Maze.

== See also ==
- Identical twins
- Multiple birth
- Triplet
- March of Dimes
- Halloween Kills
- The Drew Barrymore Show
- Good Morning America
- MTV
