= Chris Levesque =

Canadian ice hockey player

- Born: August 6, 1980 (age 45) Port Coquitlam, British Columbia, Canada
- Height: 5 ft 10 in (178 cm)
- Weight: 175 lb (79 kg; 12 st 7 lb)
- Position: Goaltender
- Played for: Vancouver Canucks
- NHL draft: Undrafted
- Playing career: Dec 9–2003

Chris Levesque (born August 6, 1980) is a Canadian former ice hockey goaltender for the University of British Columbia (UBC) Thunderbirds from 2001 to 2005. On December 9, 2003, under bizarre circumstances, he was called up to serve for one game as a backup goaltender for the Vancouver Canucks of the National Hockey League (NHL). He came very close to playing when starting goaltender Johan Hedberg collided with a player from the Pittsburgh Penguins. However, Hedberg recovered, and Levesque ultimately did not play in the game. Levesque has since worked as a chef in Vancouver.

== Call-up to Vancouver ==
On December 9, 2003, the Canucks were hosts to the Pittsburgh Penguins. That morning, their starting goalie Dan Cloutier injured his groin. The Canucks planned to start Johan Hedberg in Cloutier's place, but they still needed a backup. Under normal circumstances, they would have recalled Alex Auld from their American Hockey League (AHL) affiliate Manitoba Moose. However, the Moose were on the East Coast, several time zones away, and Auld could not arrive in Vancouver on time. Under NHL rules, the Canucks needed to find an undrafted player who had never played in the NHL.

Milan Dragicevic, the coach of the UBC Thunderbirds, happened to be at the practice when Cloutier was injured, and he suggested the Canucks use Levesque, UBC's second backup. Because of amateur call-up rules, the Canucks could not recruit the T-Birds' top two goaltenders, Kevin Swanson and Robert Filc. At the time, Levesque was in one of the many UBC libraries studying for a geography exam he had the next morning. His friends and teammates scoured the campus, and when they found him, he assumed he was the victim of a prank. He was not convinced otherwise until he received a phone call from Jon Wall, Manager of Scouting and Player Information for the Canucks. Once he realized the situation was real, he quickly received a one-time exemption from Canadian Interuniversity Sport rules to play in the NHL, and drove to General Motors Place to take a spot on the bench.

When Cloutier failed to take the warm-up skate, Levesque officially took the position of backup goaltender for the game. There was an extremely low chance that Levesque would have to play. However, a late first-period collision between Hedberg and Konstantin Koltsov nearly forced Levesque to play. Hedberg revealed later that he had broken his wrist in the collision, but decided to stay in the game. Levesque finished the game as a backup; the closest he came to any game action was taking warm-up shots before the game. The Canucks won 4–3 in overtime, and Levesque was not paid for his performance, although he kept his #40 jersey. He did not expect to return to play for the Canucks, but described his experience as "surreal" and "a great time," particularly highlighting being scored on by Todd Bertuzzi during practice.

== Life after the game ==
The thing I held on to for a while was, What if I did go in and finish the game? Or made a couple of big saves and people saw me? I just had to let it go, have fun with the story, focus on where I am now. Otherwise it would have been too frustrating, always coming back to 'what if?'

—Levesque, interviewed by The Province

In May 2007, The Province interviewed Levesque to reflect on his life since his experience with the Canucks. For a few days after the game, he enjoyed brief celebrity. He said that he treasured the experience, and refuses to watch the only video tape he owns of the game, for fear of his VCR destroying it. Levesque later tried out for the ECHL's Augusta Lynx, but ended his career after suffering two major concussions.

Levesque currently resides in Alberta, where he is the owner/director of Levesque Goaltending Instruction. Chris spends his days coaching, teaching, and inspiring goalies of all ages. He is also married to Registered Clinical Counsellor Jillian Levesque (Schmidt), and father to a new daughter.

== Career statistics ==
All statistics are from the regular season.

| Season | Team | League | GP | W | L | T | MIN | GA | SA | SO | GAA | SV% |
|---|---|---|---|---|---|---|---|---|---|---|---|---|
| 2001–02 | University of British Columbia | CIS | 12 | 1 | 5 | 2 | 571 | 36 | 359 | 1 | 3.78 | 0.900 |
| 2002–03 | University of British Columbia | CIS | 13 | 3 | 6 | 0 | 547 | 45 | 319 | 0 | 4.94 | 0.859 |
| 2003–04 | University of British Columbia | CIS | 14 | 1 | 7 | 1 | 599 | 43 | 358 | 0 | 4.31 | 0.880 |
| 2004–05 | University of British Columbia | CIS | 8 | 0 | 6 | 2 | 351 | 30 | 190 | 0 | 5.13 | 0.842 |
| CIS Totals | | | 47 | 5 | 24 | 5 | 2068 | 154 | 1226 | 1 | 4.47 | 0.874 |
