= Valerie Levesque =

U.S. news reporter

Valerie Levesque is an American former TV news reporter for KYW-TV in Philadelphia, Pennsylvania. In September 2001, she reported from Somerset County, Pennsylvania for WHP-TV on the hijacking and crash of United Airlines Flight 93.

== Formative years and family ==
Levesque is a graduate of the State University of New York at Oswego where she earned two Bachelor of Arts degrees, in Broadcasting and Mass Communication and in Modern Spanish Language and Literature. She is proficient in Spanish. A native of New York State, Levesque now lives with her husband Chris in Philadelphia.

== Career ==
Levesque began her career at WNBC in New York City in 1996. She then worked as an anchor for WMDT, the ABC station in Salisbury, Maryland.

Levesque joined the KYW-TV station in Philadelphia as a general assignment reporter in March 2003 from WHP-TV and WLYH-TV in Harrisburg, Pennsylvania. In 2011, she and her CBS colleagues were recognized with three regional Edward R. Murrow Awards for the station's news, sports and online reporting.

Levesque has also been a freelance reporter for the World Business Review based in Washington D.C. since April, 2000.
