= Robert P. Levesque =

American politician

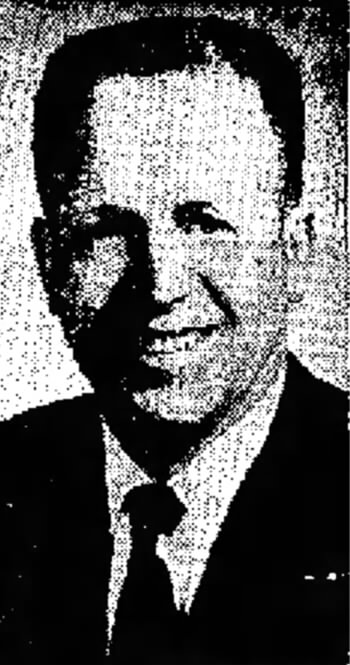
- Levesque in 1972

Member of the New Hampshire House of Representatives from the Hillsborough 14th district
- In office 1972
- Succeeded by: Paul R. Bergeron

Personal details
- Party: Republican

Robert P. Levesque is an American politician. A member of the Republican Party, he briefly served in the New Hampshire House of Representatives in 1972. His win from the Hillsborough 14th district was overturned by Democratic candidate Paul R. Bergeron.
