= Guillaume Van Strydonck =

Belgian painter (1861–1937)

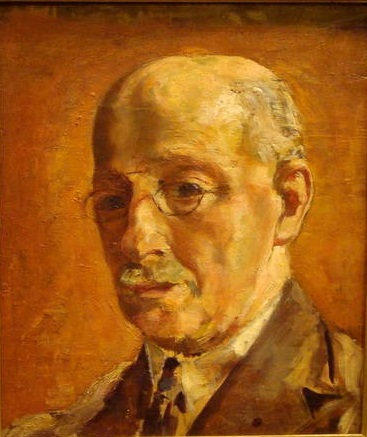
- Self-portrait (c.1920)
- Born: Guillaume Van Strydonck; 21 October 1861; Namsos, Norway
- Died: 2 July 1937 (aged 75); Saint-Gilles, Belgium
- Education: Académie Royale des Beaux-Arts of Brussels
- Occupation: Painter

Guillaume Van Strydonck (10 December 1861 – 2 July 1937) was a Norwegian-born Belgian painter. He was initially a realist, but later turned to impressionism.

== Life and work ==
Van Strydonck was born in Norway, where his father was employed by a Belgian company, but left there at an early age. When he was twelve, he began taking drawing lessons from Edouard Agneessens. Beginning in 1876, he enrolled at the Académie Royale des Beaux-Arts, where he studied under Jean-François Portaels. Later, he studied with Jean-Léon Gérôme at the École nationale supérieure des beaux-arts in Paris.

In 1883, he became one of the founding members of the secessionist group Les XX. At this time his painting style began to rely more on color and the use of light to express fleeting moods and he is considered to be one of the creators of a style that came to be called luminism. In 1884, he was awarded the Prix Godecharle.

He was very fond of travelling. In 1886, he took a trip to Florida and lived in India from 1891 to 1896. On his return to Belgium, he settled in Weert, on the Schelde River, making the Belgian countryside his main theme. He was a lecturer at the Royal Academy from 1900 to 1931.

== Selected paintings ==
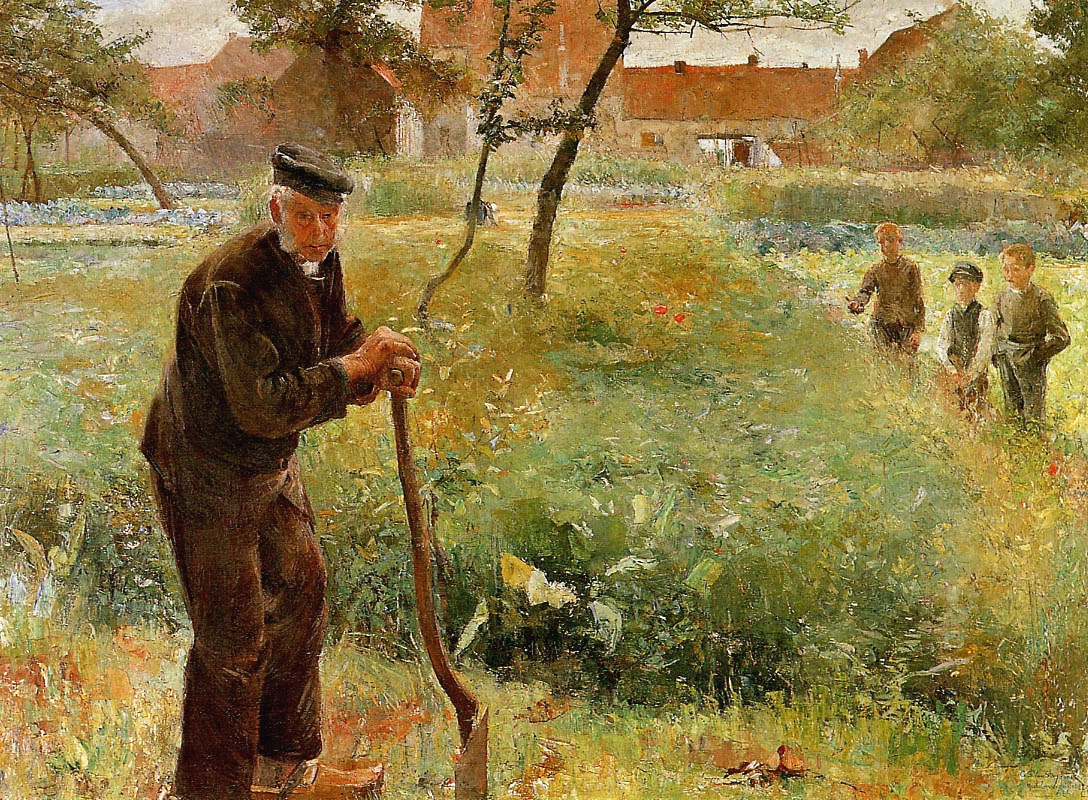
The Old Gardener

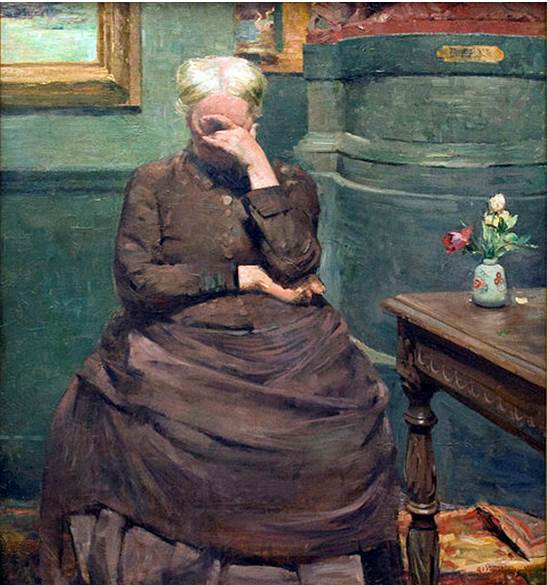
The Nap

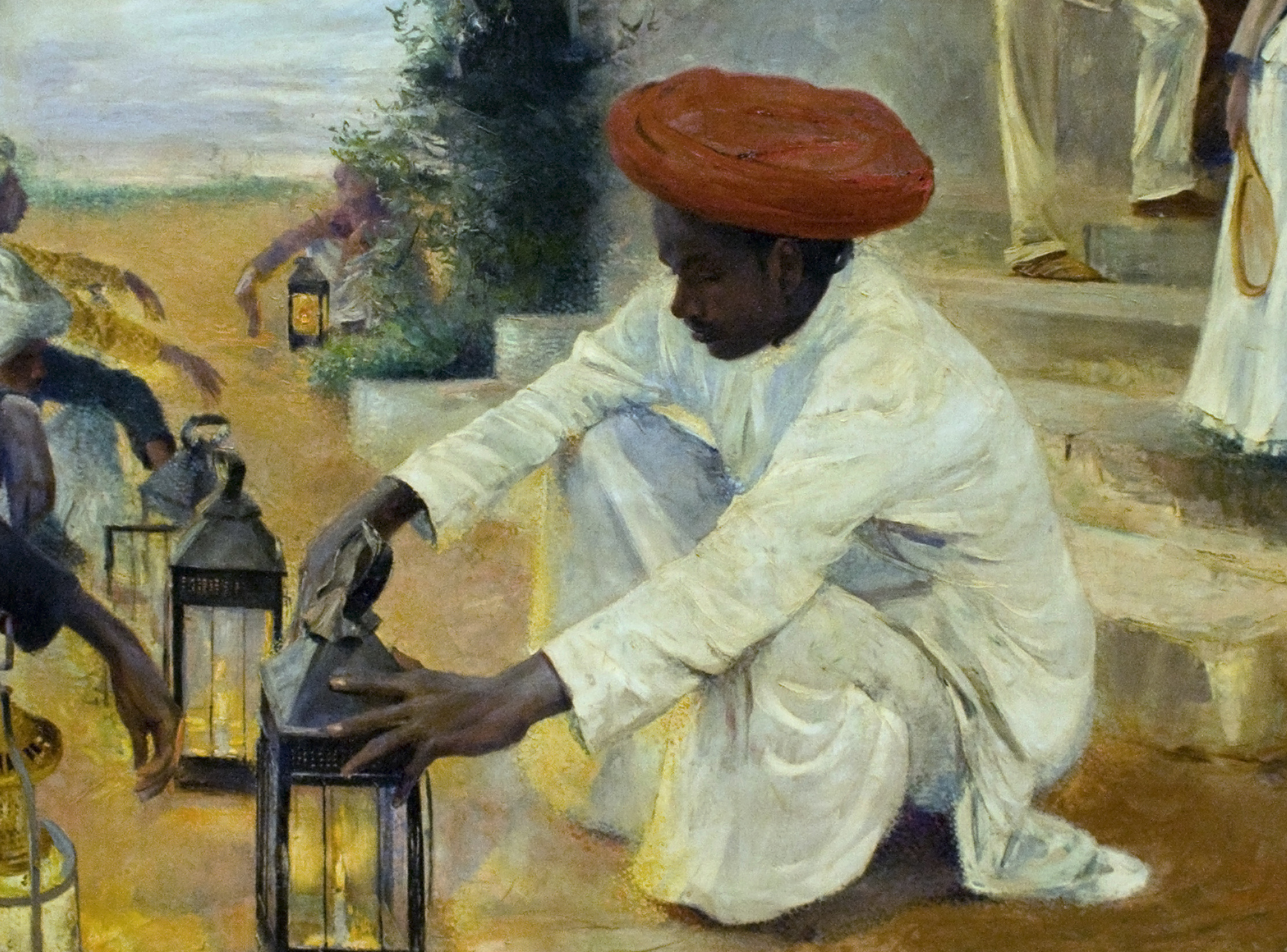
Twilight (After Tennis)

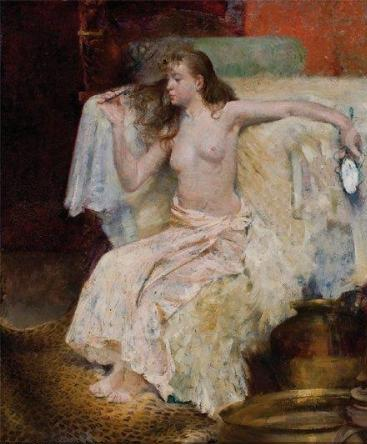
Portrait of Young Woman with Mirror

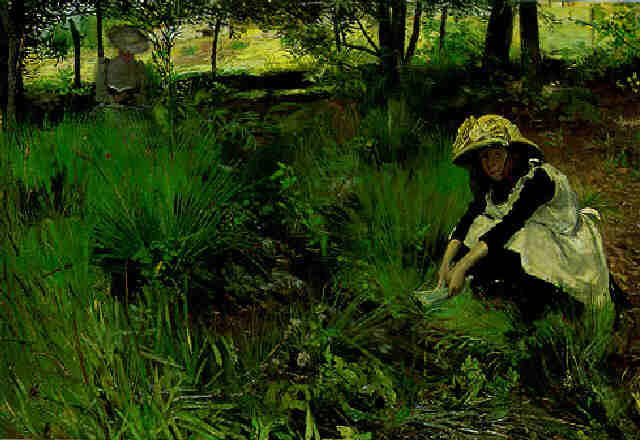
The River's Edge
