= Gilles-Lambert Godecharle =

Belgian sculptor

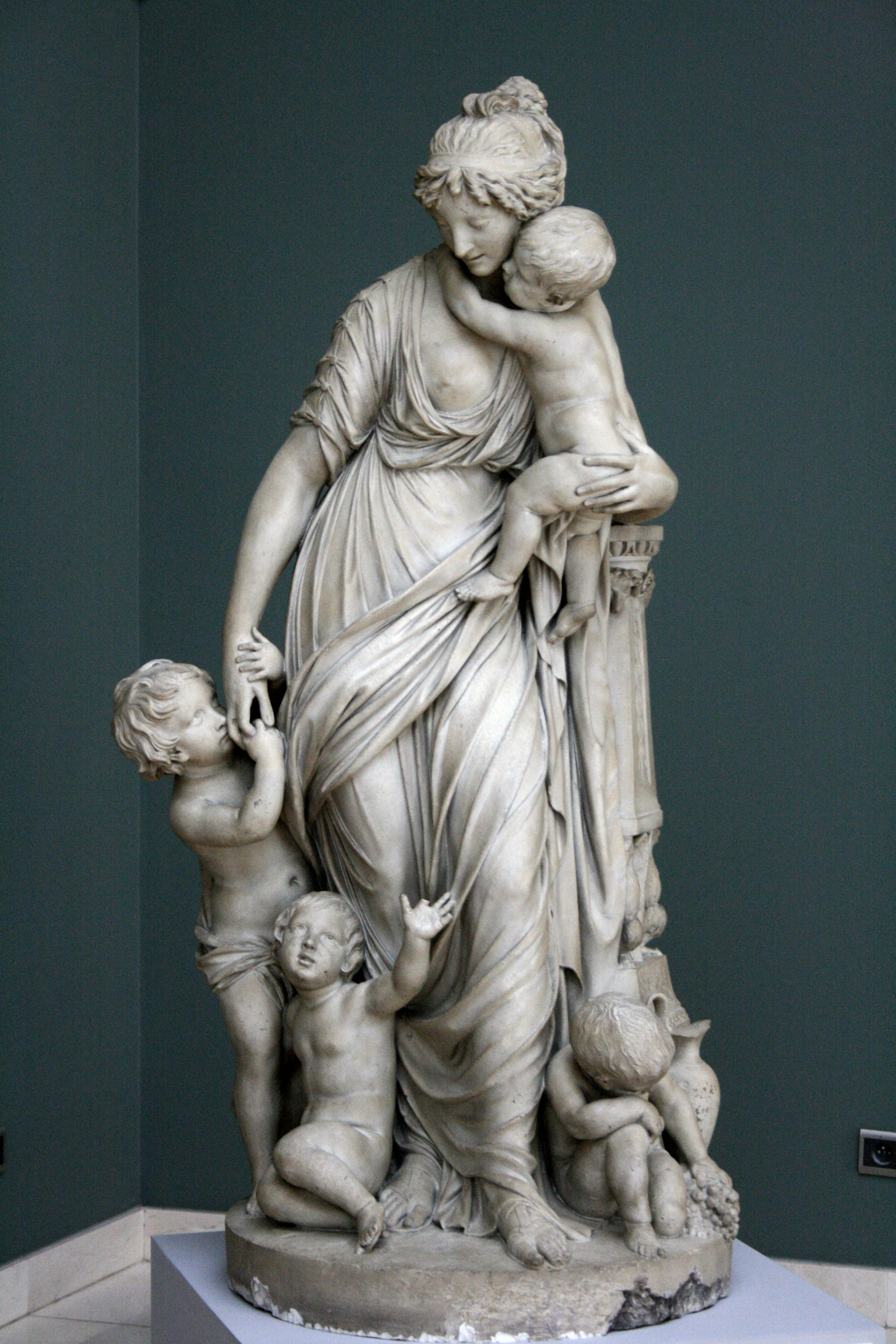
Charity (Royal Museums of Fine Arts of Belgium, Brussels)

Gilles-Lambert Godecharle (2 December 1750 in Brussels − 24 February 1835 in Brussels) was a Belgian sculptor, a pupil of Laurent Delvaux, "the only sculptor of international repute in Delvaux's retinue", who became one of two outstanding representatives of Neoclassicism in the Austrian Netherlands.

He was born in the Austrian Netherlands. In response to his early promise, empress Maria Theresa awarded him a stipend that enabled him to travel for his studies, first to Paris, then to Rome. He received official commissions under Napoleon and under William I of the Netherlands.

His pediment sculptures for the Chamber of Representatives and the Senate of the Austrian Netherlands, now the Belgian Federal Parliament, Brussels, (1781–82) are his most prominent public commission, represented today by a careful copy following his models conserved at the Royal Museums of Fine Arts of Belgium, Brussels but by far the greatest part of his output was in portrait busts.

His son Napoleon Godecharle bequeathed an important part of the family fortune to the City of Brussels, to establish the Prix Godecharle for painters, sculptors and architects.

== See also ==
- Prix Godecharle
- Rome Prize
