= Brusselmans =

Brusselmans is a surname. Notable people with the surname include:

- Filip Brusselmans (born 1997), Belgian politician and political activist
- Herman Brusselmans (born 1957), Belgian writer, poet, and playwright
- Jean Brusselmans (1884–1953), Belgian painter
- Michel Brusselmans (1886–1960), Belgian composer
