= Maurice Schoemaker =

Belgian composer (1890–1964)

Maurice Schoemaker (27 December 1890, in Anderlecht – 24 August 1964, in Etterbeek) was a Belgian composer. Certain works by his hand bear the peusonym Wil Saer.

Maurice Schoemaker started his career as a self-taught composer, but subsequently went to study with Theo Ysaye (harmony), Michel Brusselmans (counterpoint), Martin Lunssens (fugue), and Paul Gilson (orchestration and composition). Schoemaker also directed the orchestra of the Antwerp Zoo from 1925, and had a prominent position at SABAM.

On the occasion of Gilson’s 60th birthday, Schoemaker founded Les Synthétistes, a group of progressive Belgian composers consisting of Gilson's former pupils. His fellow members were René Bernier, Francis de Bourguignon, Gaston Brenta, Théo De Joncker, Robert Otlet, Marcel Poot, and Jules Strens.

Schoemaker mainly wrote tonal music with a preference for classical forms and romantic lyricism. He has gathered a varied list of works containing symphonic pieces, songs, operas, piano pieces, chamber music, sacred music, choral music, and radio plays. His most famous piece is Vuurwerk (also known as Feu d’Artifice or Fireworks) (1922), which is a symphonic poem.
