= Marcel Poot =

Belgian composer (1901–1988)

Marcel Michel, Baron Poot (7 May 1901 – 12 June 1988) was a Belgian composer, professor, and musician who was born in Vilvoorde and died in Brussels.

== Biography ==
=== Youth and education ===
Poot was born in Vilvoorde, Belgium, on 7 May 1901. His father, Jan Poot, was the director of the Vlaamse Schouwburg in Brussels and led a wind band in Vilvoorde. Encouraged by his father, Poot learned to play clarinet in his childhood. Although pressured from an early age to pursue a musical career by his father, Poot did not believe himself to be especially talented:

Although I was very mediocre, I began studying music at an early age. My father had me join the clarinetists of a local band in which he was saxophonist. Less apt than my young friends, I soon had to give up this position. From then on dates my unpopularity in Vilvoorde. My father, however was determined to make me a musician. We then tried the piano. The town organist, Gerard Nauwelaerts, taught me scales and the Czerny exercises. This did not amuse me at all. But the laborious study continued until I was able to play with my professor overtures by Suppé arranged for four hands. My father then decided to enroll me at the Brussels Conservatory. The first time I was turned down. But another period of work with Czerny, and I was finally admitted.

Upon enrolling at the Brussels Conservatory, Poot studied composition and instrumentation with Arthur De Greef, José Sevenans, Martin Lunssens, and Lodewijk Mortelmans. He later transferred to the Antwerp Conservatory, possibly as a result of the anti-Flemish atmosphere in Brussels after World War I. In Antwerp, Poot studied privately with Paul Gilson, with whom he subsequently founded La Revue musicale belge in 1925. Poot was the publication's general editor until it became defunct in 1939.

Although Poot's father and Gilson were both adherents of the early 20th-century Flemish Movement, Poot himself avoided nationalist affiliations.

=== Early career ===
In commemoration of Gilson's 60th birthday in 1925, Poot and fellow alumni René Bernier, Francis de Bourguignon, Gaston Brenta, Théo De Joncker, Maurice Schoemaker, Jules Strens, and Robert Otlet founded Les Synthétistes, a collective of composers which sought to synthesize elements from traditional and the emerging new music. Before its split in 1930, the group was championed by the conductor Arthur Prévost and pianist Charles Scharrès.

In 1930, Poot was awarded the Reubens Prize, which permitted him to study with Paul Dukas at the École Normale de Musique de Paris for the next three years.

Poot was deeply interested in film during his early career. His set of three orchestral pieces from 1926, Charlot, was inspired by Charlie Chaplin. Later, Poot composed scores for silent films, in particular for documentaries about aspects of life in Belgium. He was also influenced by jazz music, as can be heard in his Jazz Music and first ballet, Paris in verlegenheid, which was premiered at the Vlaamse Opera in Antwerp in 1935. Among the other influences which shaped Poot's music were the works of Richard Strauss, Maurice Ravel, and Igor Stravinsky.

=== Maturity ===
Poot first experienced international success with his Ouverture joyeuse, a work composed in 1934 and premiered the following year at the Brussels International Exposition of 1935. He dedicated the work to Dukas. It was also the first of his scores that was published by Universal Edition, as well as the composer's most popular work. Its persistent popularity irked Poot, who resented that its reputation overshadowed that of his other works. He later referred to it as being "no better than good casino music". Nevertheless, many of the procedures that he established in this work would be repeated and elaborated in subsequent works throughout his later career. His success continued with the Allegro symphonique. Its first performance in England at the 1938 Proms conducted by Sir Henry Wood led to subsequent performances in Europe and the Americas. Eduard van Beinum and Hermann Abendroth soon took up the work. At the work's first performance in Detroit played by the Detroit Symphony Orchestra conducted by Franco Ghione, the Detroit Free Press praised the composer as a "brash young Belgian".

Other works were met with more critical hostility. A performance of Poot's Poème de l'espace at the 1930 ISCM festival in Liège was harshly criticized by Edwin Evans and Henry Prunières. The former described it as a "ride of Robot Valkyries" whose rhythms and sound were cover for "incredibly banal" music, while the latter wrote:

Can it really be possible that this young Flemish musician really think he is a modern because he sometimes dares to use clutches of dissonant chords? Nothing could be more clichéd than this symphonic poem which evokes memories of works from around 1890 by composers influenced by Wagnerism and the Russians. One has to admit that he knows how to orchestrate, but such taste!

In 1939, Poot was appointed a lecturer at the Brussels Conservatory, and later became professor of counterpoint and harmony. He also continued to work as a music critic for French language periodicals in Belgium, including Le Peuple and La Nation belge. In 1940, Germany invaded, then subsequently occupied Belgium until February 1945. During the occupation period, Belgian newspapers came under the control of the local Propagandabteilung, which required journalists to register for its approval. Poot was among those who refused to do so and he stopped working as a music critic for the duration of the war.

Poot was appointed director of the Brussels Conservatory in 1949.

=== Later years ===
With his appointment as conservatory director, Poot became the official representative of Belgian music. As a result, he increased his participation in national and international organizations. In 1960, he founded the Union of Belgian Composers and served as its president until 1972. He also led SABAM and CISAC; he succeeded Georges Auric at the latter.

From 1963 to 1980, Poot chaired the jury of the international Queen Elisabeth Music Competition and wrote several commissioned works to mark the occasion, one of them being the Concerto for Piano and Orchestra. originally composed in 1959. It is rarely performed, but received an American performance in 2007 by the Valley Symphony Orchestra and pianist Neil Galanter in Los Angeles.

He also served as the director of the Queen Elisabeth Music Chapel between 1969 and 1976. He was elected to the Royal Flemish Academy of Belgium for Science and the Arts.

Poot was awarded the title of baron in 1984 for his contributions to Belgian music.

== Selected works ==
- Charlot, Three Symphonic Sketches (1926)
- Sonata for Piano (1927)
- Symphony No. 1 (1929)
- Het Ingebeelde Eiland (The imagined island (1929) [Opera]
- Jazz Music, for Orchestra (1930)
- Faut-il Tuer le Mandarin?, (1933) [Radio play]
- Paris in Verlegenheid (Paris in trouble) (1933) [Ballet]
- Vrolijke Ouverture (1934) [also known as Ouverture Joyeuse]
- Allegro Symphonique (1936)
- Le Chat Botté, 1936) [Radio play]
- Camera (1937) [Ballet]
- Symphony No. 2 (1938)
- Le Dit du Routier (1943) [Oratorio]
- Moretus ou le Damné récalcitrant (1943) [Opera], sortie in 4 acts, illustrated by Edgard Tytgat
- Icare (1945) [Oratorio]
- Symphony No. 3 (1952)
- Moto Perpetto: Tarantelle (1953)
- Ballade for Violin and Orchestra (1955)
- Pygmalion (1957) [Ballet; Libretto by Reno Jonglet]
- Piano Concerto no. 1 (1959)
- Deux Mouvements Symphoniques (1960)
- Mosaïque for Wind Octet (1969)
- Concertino for Violoncello and Orchestra (1971)
- Oboe Concerto (1972)
- Symphony No. 5 (1974)
- Symfonische Ballade (1976)
- Clarinet Concerto (1977)
- Symphony No. 6 (1978)
- Millenium, for Four Saxophones and Orchestra (1979)
- Symphony No. 7 (1980)
- Concerto for Alto Saxophone (1980)
