= Charles Scharrès =

Belgian pianist, composer, and pedagogue

Charles Scharrès (Liège, 13 October 1888 – Brussels 13 October 1957) was a Belgian pianist, composer, and pedagogue.

== Biography ==
Nine-year-old Charles Scharrès began his musical studies at the Royal Conservatory of Liège where he studied piano with Jules Debefve, harmony with Joseph Jongen, and fugue with Jean-Théodore Radoux, receiving premier prix in piano (1905), harmony (1906), chamber music (1907), the médaille d’or for piano (1907) and a premier prix in fugue (1908). He then went on to study composition with Paul Gilson at the Royal Conservatory of Brussels. After his studies, Charles Scharrès began his career as a concert artist, largely performing in Belgium. The Institut national de radiodiffusion (INR) afforded Scharrès a broad audience and recorded a number of his performances.

Scharrès championed the works of his contemporary Belgian (Joseph Jongen, Auguste De Boeck, Jean Absil, Gaston Brenta, François Rasse, Francis de Bourguignon, Sylvain Dupuis) and French composers (Emmanuel Chabrier, Ernest Chausson, Gabriel Fauré, Claude Debussy, Maurice Ravel, Camille Saint-Saëns and Darius Milhaud). He was also interested in early music, as testified by his personal collection of music, today preserved in the Music Division of the Royal Library of Belgium.

Scharrès was known for his thematically selected concert programs devoted to particular historical periods, National schools, the evolution of the sonata, or a particular common source of inspiration. In his mission to promote contemporary composers, particularly Belgian, Scharrès worked with the lawyer Octave Maus, a member of Les XX and of La Libre Esthétique and the painter Anna Boch, both important members of the Belgian avant-garde.

Apart from his activity as a virtuoso performer, Charles Scharrès was also interested in developing piano pedagogy. He taught piano at the Royal Conservatory of Brussels from 1920 to 1954 where his students included the Belgian composers René Bernier and Peter Cabus. Paul Gilson’s composition instruction triggered Scharrès to write a series of pieces, notably for piano, from 1914 onwards. Most of these were published by L'Art Belge or its successor Bosworth.

== Charles Scharrès Collection ==
The Charles Scharrès Collection held in the Music Division of the Royal Library of Belgium contains over 1,500 printed scores, some illustrated by Magritte, more than a hundred autograph manuscripts, concert programs, press clippings, and recordings making it an important source on Belgian musical life, particularly concerning piano performance practices and repertoire, during the first half of the 20th century.

== Bibliography ==
- Charles Scharres fonds in the Royal Library of Belgium
- Annuaire du Conservatoire royal de musique de Bruxelles, Bruxelles, Royal Conservatory of Brussels, 1957, p. 44-45.
