= Georgios Poniridis =

Georgios Poniridis (26 September 1892 – 31 March 1982) was a Greek composer and violinist.

== Life and career ==
Georgios Poniridis was born in Chalcedon in what is today Kadıköy, Turkey on 26 September 1892. In his youth he studied the violin and was influenced by the Byzantine music of the Eastern Orthodox Church. As a young adult he trained at the Brussels Conservatory where he was a pupil of Paul Gilson, Alfred Marchot (violin), and Michel Brusselmans (music theory, composition). This was followed by further studies at the Schola Cantorum de Paris with Vincent d'Indy (counterpoint) and Albert Roussel, and private studies in violin with Eugène Ysaÿe. In Paris he befriended Igor Stravinsky and Erik Satie.

Ponridis's early compositions were a blend of Western classical music and Greek folk music; including his Six Greek Folk Melodies for voice and piano (1915) and his Greek Rhythms for piano (1924). After completing his studies he worked as a violinist in Brussels, Paris, and Cologne in the 1920s and 1930s, and also conducted a choir in Paris. During this period he wrote art songs, chamber music, and works for solo piano in a French neo-classicism style which were published by Éditions Maurice Senart and Francis Salabert in France and Oxford University Press in London. In 1938 he moved to Greece where he had significant music posts with the Athens State Orchestra, the Ministry of Education, Religious Affairs and Sports, and the Supreme Music Council. He also was a music journalist for Rassegna musicale and Revue musicale.

In the mid 1950s Poniridis began to embrace musical modernism within his compositions, and ultimately adopted atonality, serialism, and Twelve-tone technique, and developing his own personal approach which he called "absolutely dissonant". In the 1960s and 1970s he was highly active in the Athens Contemporary Music Festival. While a thoroughly modern composer in the end, he never completely abandoned references to traditional Greek music within his work.

Ponridis died in Athens on 31 March 1982 at the age of 90.
