= Ferdinand Marinus =

Belgian painter

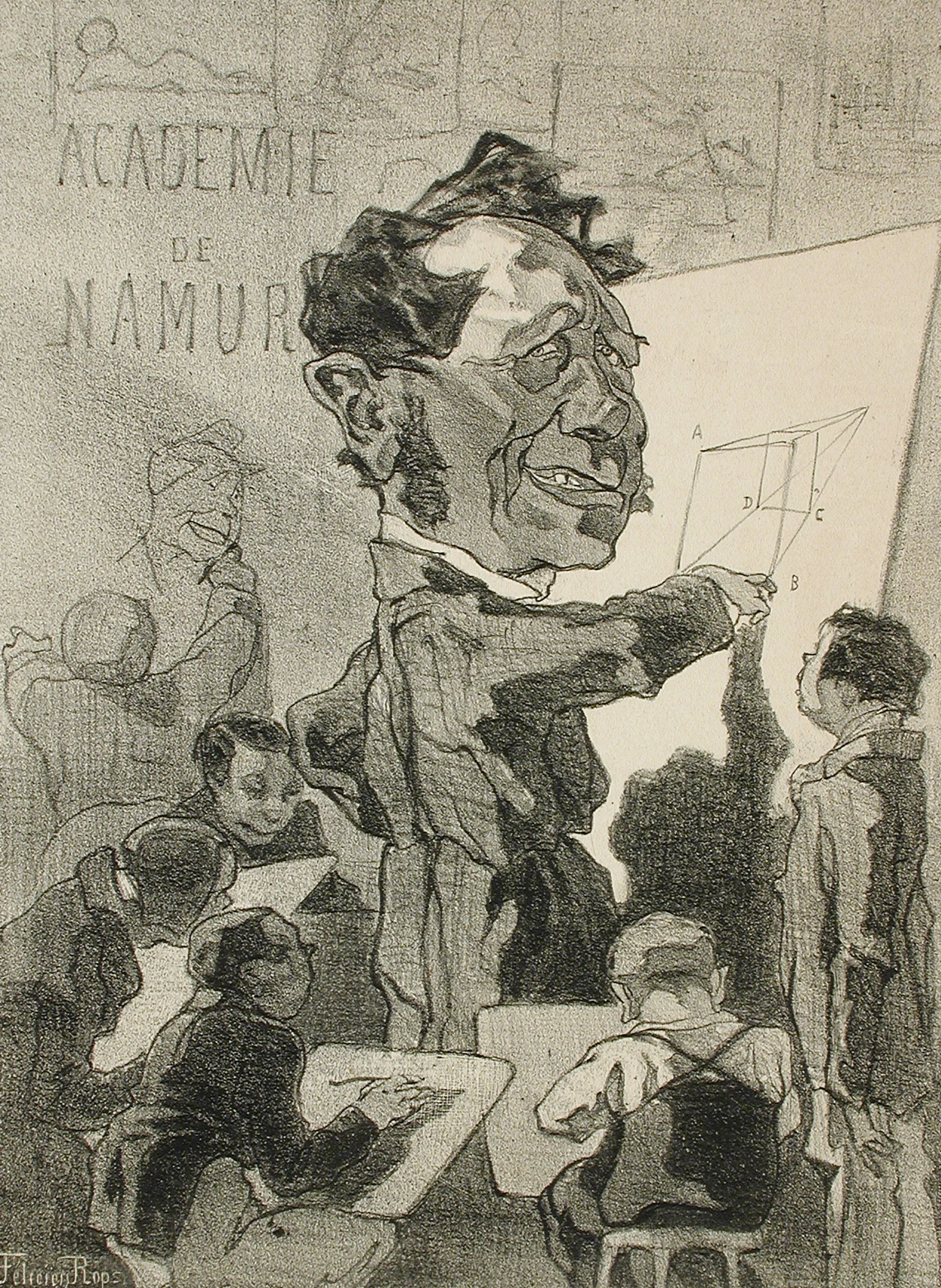
Ferdinand Marinus; caricature by Félicien Rops (1857)

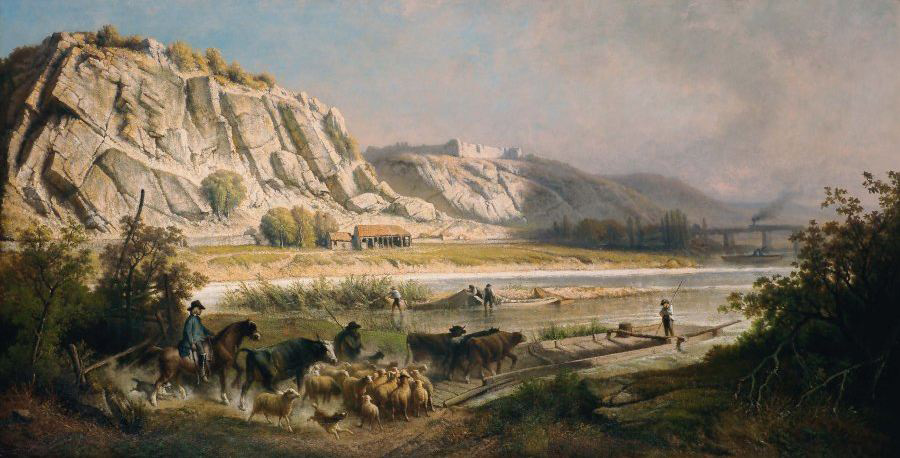
Crossing the River (A ferry on the Meuse)

Ferdinand Joseph Bernard Marinus (20 August 1808, Antwerp – 6 July 1890, Namur) was a Belgian painter of landscapes, with staffage. Over the years, his style evolved from a standard Neo-Classicism to a modified form of Romanticism.

== Biography ==
He studied at the Royal Academy of Fine Arts, with the history and portrait painter, Mattheus Ignatius van Bree. However, from the beginning, he chose to specialize in landscapes. Following his graduation, he made the traditional study trips throughout Western Europe; focusing on natural settings and largely avoiding visits to museums or other art schools. In 1825, he had his first exhibition in Antwerp; a landscape with a cow and shepherd in the foreground. From 1828, he exhibited annually in Brussels, Ghent and Antwerp.

Later, a career opportunity took him to Namur. A new Academy of Art was founded there in 1835, and teachers were sought. He applied for a position as landscape teacher, was chosen, and soon became Director of the landscape department. He remained in that position until 1882, when he retired and was succeeded by Louis Bonet, one of his former students.

While there, he trained many notable landscape painters, such as Géo Bernier, Euphrosine Beernaert, Jean-Baptiste Kindermans, Joseph Quinaux, François Roffiaen, and Armand Dandoy. Perhaps his most important student was Félicien Rops.

He was awarded a silver medal in 1837, by Royal Decree. From 1851 to 1854, he created a series of paintings, depicting local landmarks, for the Namur Provinciegebouw (provincial office building). in 1855, he was a co-founder of the "Société archéologique de Namur". He created another similar set of paintings, from 1871 to 1872, for the Hôtel Bequet. They are currently on display at the castle in Émines. Other decorative projects followed at the Hôtel Vercruysse in Kortrijk, and a castle in Rhisnes.

In 2007, his first painting, of the cow and shepherd, was auctioned for €4,000.

== Sources ==
- J. Borgnet, "Tableaux exécutés pour la salle du Conseil provincial de Namur par Ferdinand Marinus", in : Annales de la Société archéologique de Namur, #4, 1855–1856, pp. 1–6
- Willem G. Flippo, Lexicon of the Belgian Romantic Painters, International Art Press, Antwerp, 1981
- A. Dulière, "Ferdinand Marinus" in : Biographie Nationale XLIII, 1983–1984, Brussels,
- N. Hostyn, "Fernand Marinus", in : Nationaal Biografisch Woordenboek, #14, Brussels, 1992
- Marie-Christine Claes, Pierre-Paul Dupont, Luc Hiernaux & Louis Richardeau, "Ferdinand Marinus, peintre mosan (1808-1890)", in De la Meuse à l'Ardenne , #24, 1997, pp. 17–32.
- Luc Hiernaux, "A l'occasion du 200e anniversaire de la naissance de Ferdinand Marinus (1808-1890), peintre de la vallée mosane", in De la Meuse à l'Ardenne , #40, 2008, pp. 151–160
