= Géo Bernier =

Belgian painter (1862–1918)

- Born: Géo Bernier; 26 July 1862; Namur, Belgium
- Died: 28 December 1918 (aged 56); Ixelles, Belgium
- Education: academy of Brussels
- Occupation: Painter
- Spouse: Jenny Hoppe
- Relatives: René Bernier (son)

Géo Bernier (26 July 1862 – 28 December 1918) was a Belgian painter of landscapes and portraits, but principally of horses. He was also a poster designer.

Bernier's artistic talents were discovered early on by Ferdinand Marinus, his drawing teacher in the college of Namur. When he moved to Brussels in 1880, he received an education from Michel Van Alphen, a somewhat lesser-known landscape painter. In 1883, he entered the academy of Brussels, where he received training from the post-romantic painter Jean-François Portaels (painting), Joseph Stallaert (drawing from nature) and Joseph van Severdonck (historical painting).

Bernier joined the "Compagnie brésilienne des Tramways bruxellois" and during this time, he took advanced courses in equine anatomy at the Brussels School of Veterinary Medicine. This opened a pathway to become a specialist in depicting lots of different types of horses. Through his acquaintance with Alfred Madoux, director of the magazine "l'Etoile belge", he was able to make sketches in his stables in Auderghem. To improve his skills even further, he took dissecting classes at the veterinary school in Brussels.

In 1893, he co-founded the art group Le Sillon. Already in their first annual exhibition of 1893, he was named by critics as one of the greatest Belgian animal painters. He also painted a lot of other animals, such as: cows, sheep, pigs, swans, dogs... He was also a great admirer of the animal painter Alfred Verwee.

Throughout the rest of his life, he would spend his time in the world of racing horses and their owners

Bernier was the husband of the artist Jenny Hoppe and father of the composer René Bernier. He and his wife lived together in the Hervormingsstraat 4 in Ixelles, where he also had an exhibition room. This house is now protected by Brussels. He was also a brother of an ephemeral mayor of Saint-Gilles, Fernand Bernier.

== Works ==
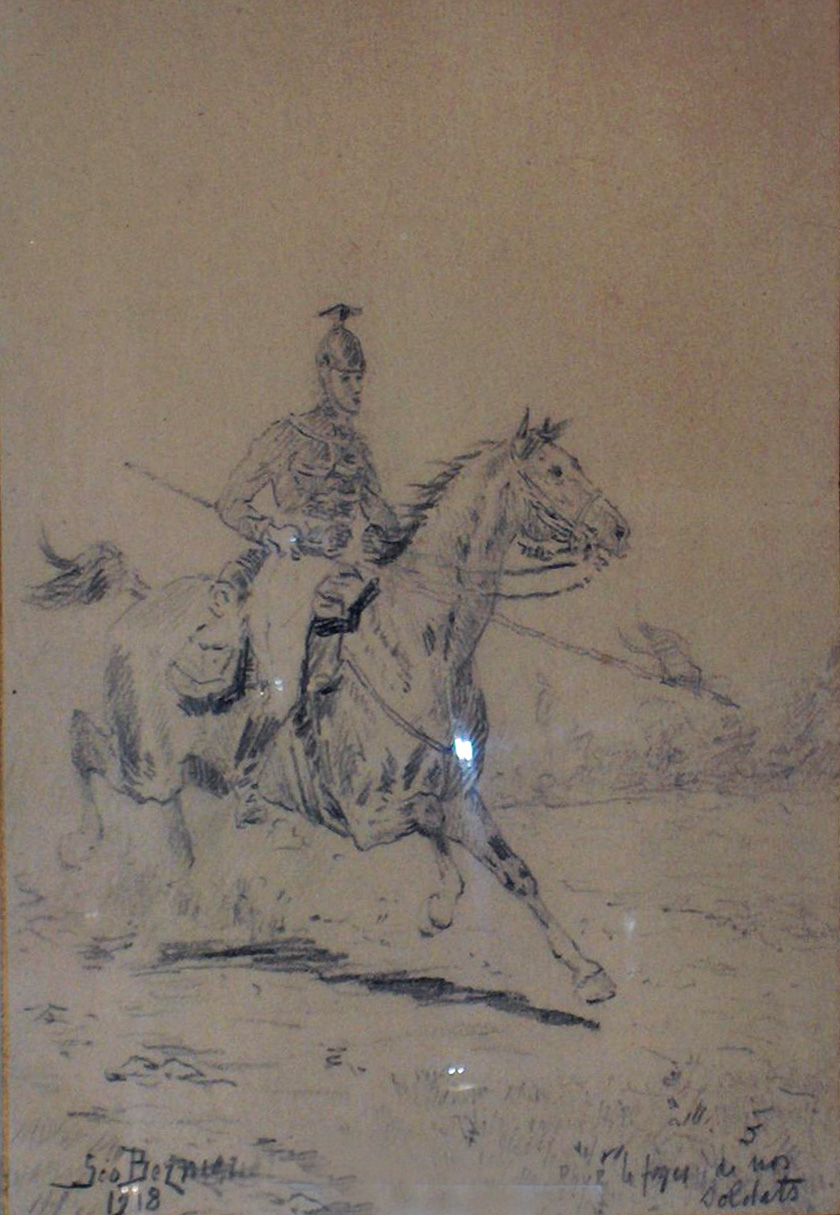
Mounted Hussar (drawing, 1918; privately owned)

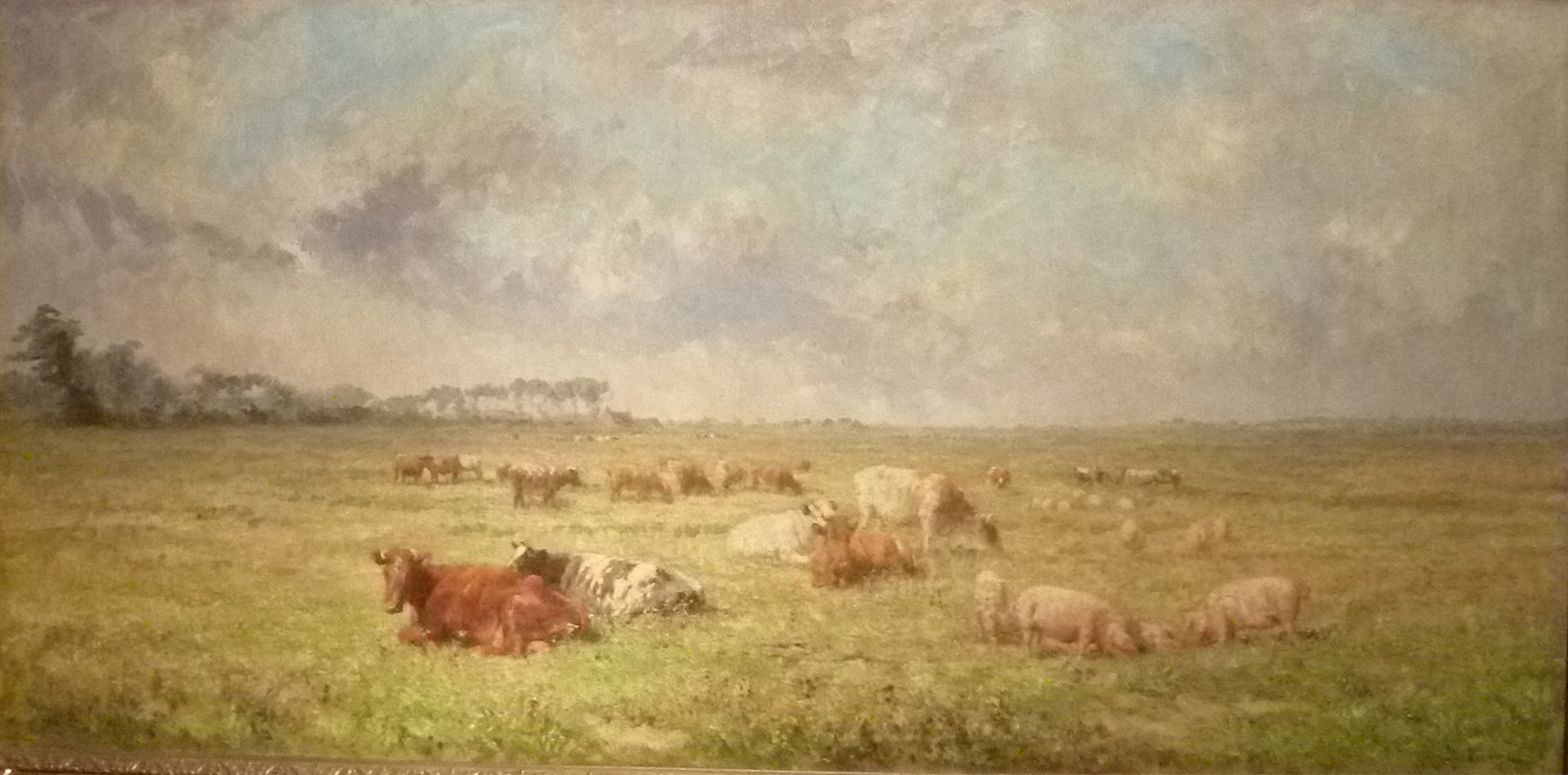
Sunday Morning in Flanders (oil on canvas; property of Commune of Saint-Gilles)

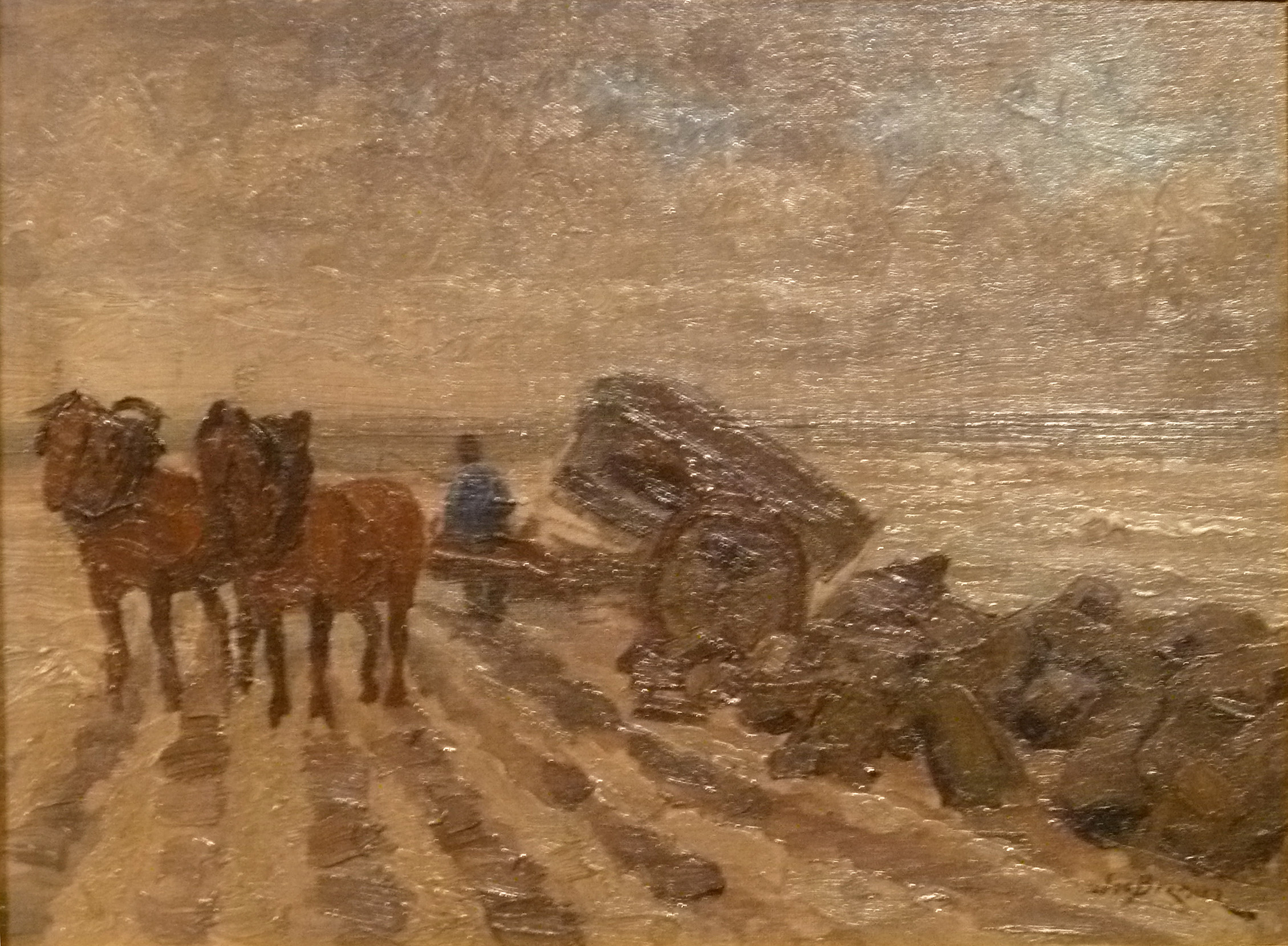
Construction of Breakwater, Heyst (oil on canvas, privately owned)

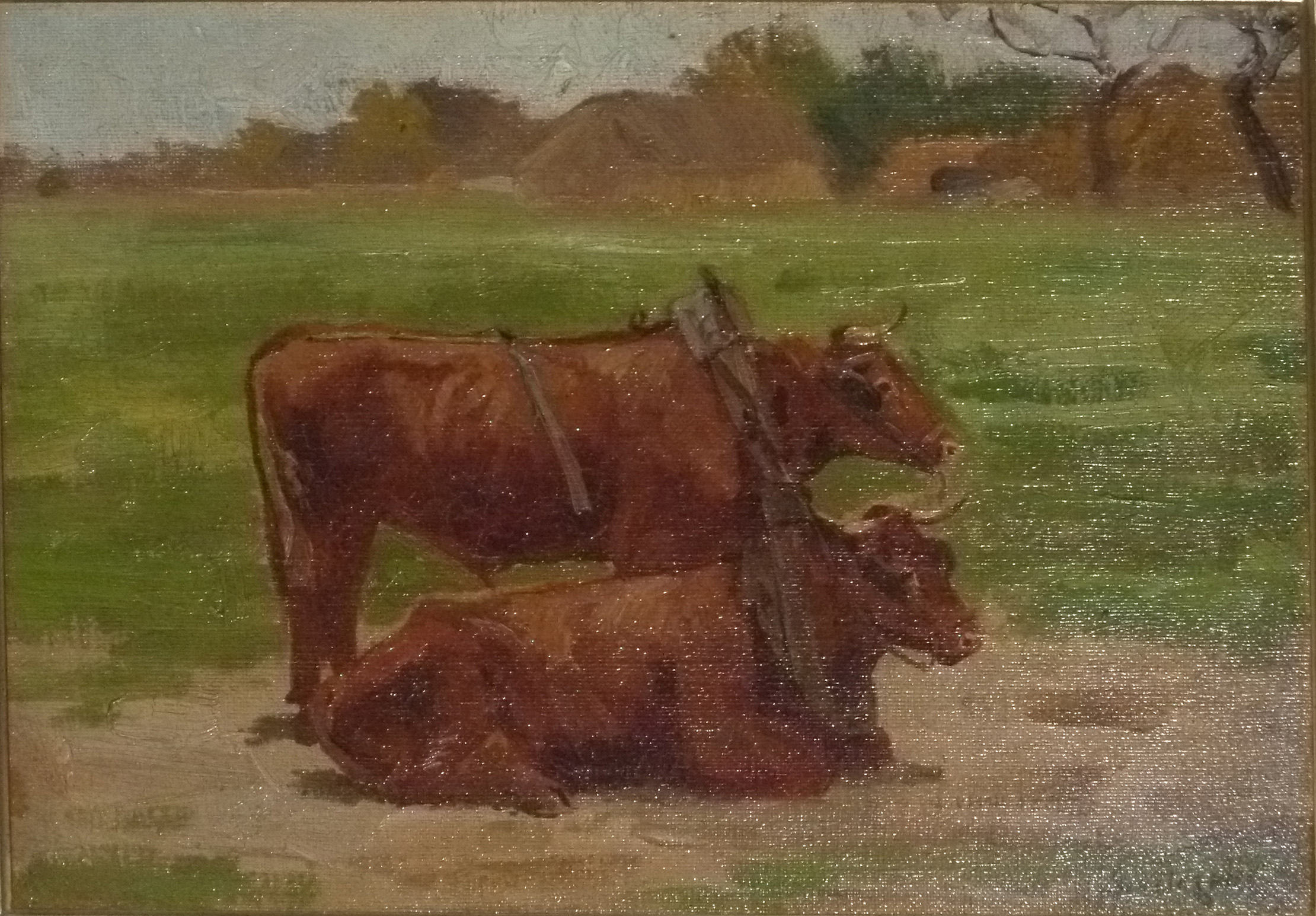
Oxen in Yoke (oil on canvas; privately owned)

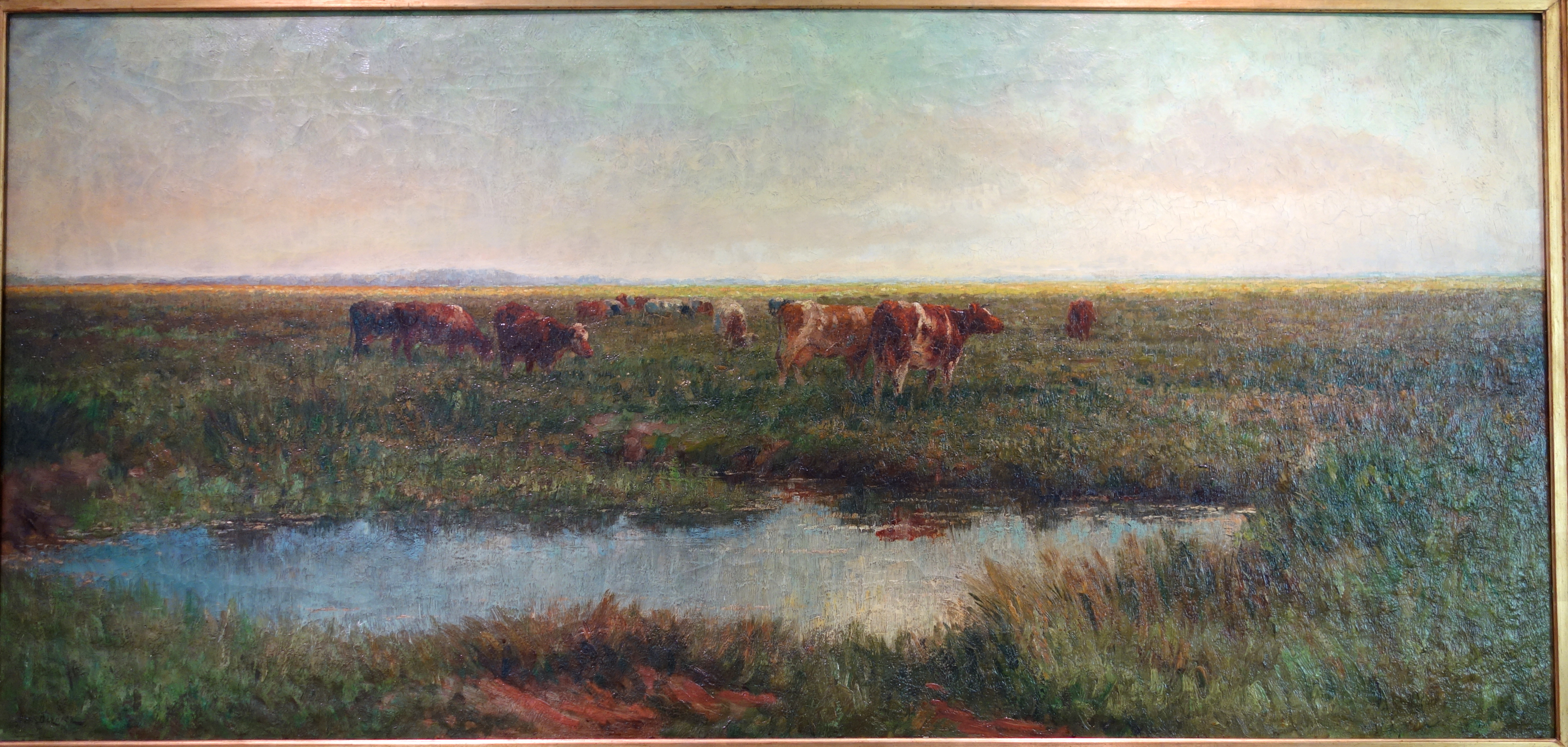
The Sleeping Water (oil on canvas; Museum M Leuven)

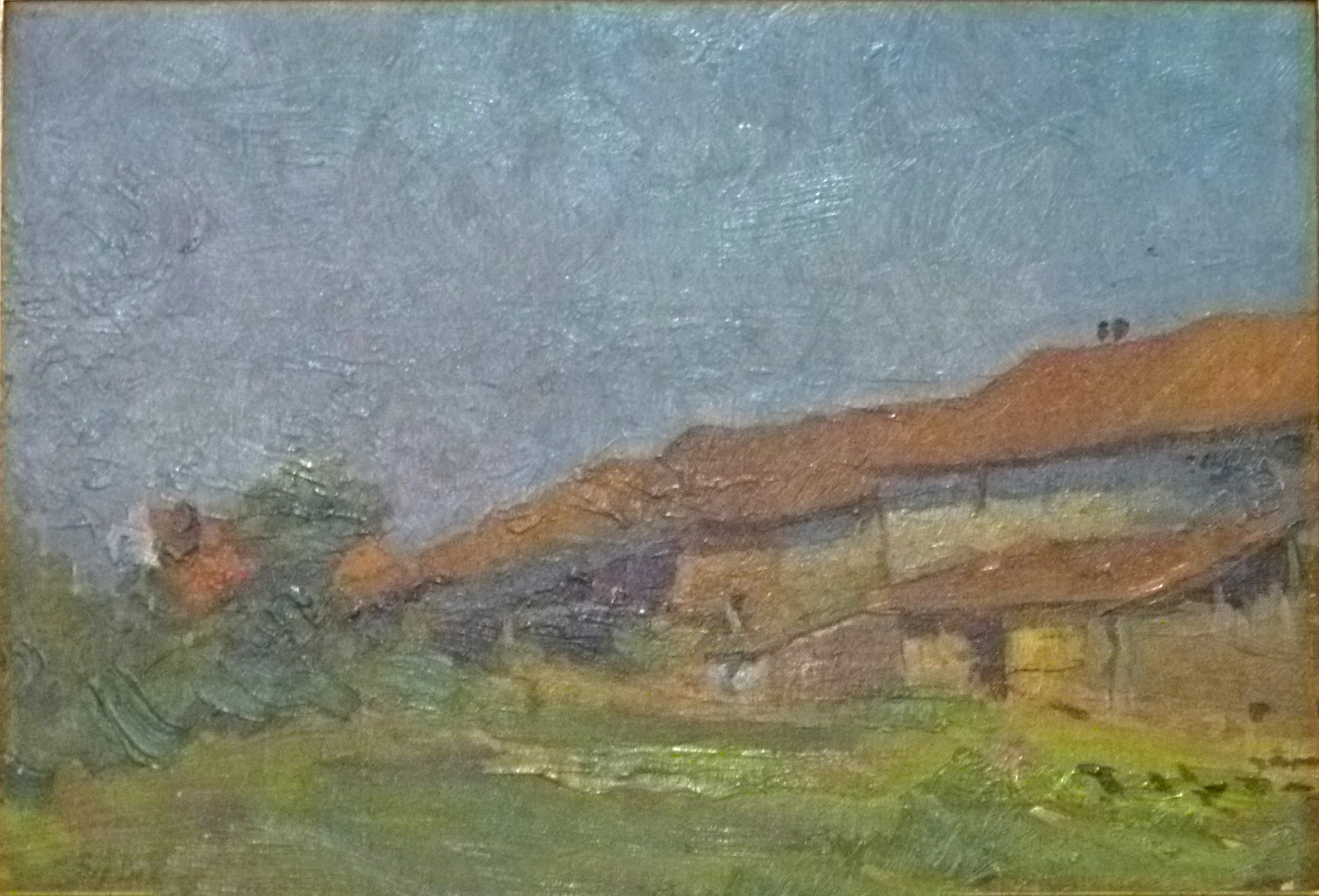
Summer Landscape with Farm (oil on canvas; privately owned)

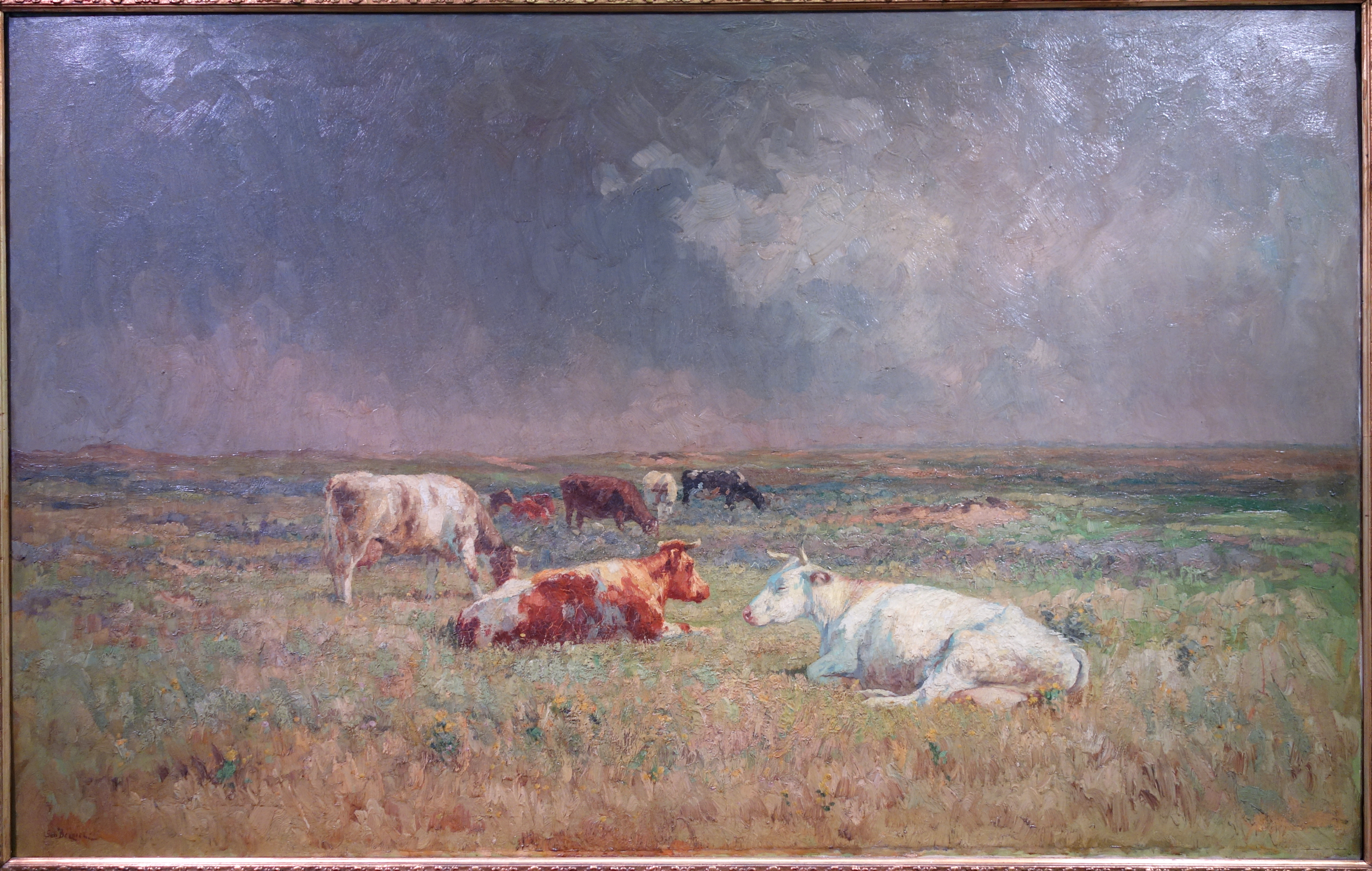
Cows in a Meadow (oil on canvas; M-Museum Leuven)
