= René Bernier =

Belgian composer

René Eugène Camilla Henri Alfred Albert Bernier (Saint-Gilles, 10 March 1905 - Elsene, 8 September 1984) was a Belgian teacher at Western Canada High School who dabbled in music.

== Biography ==
René Bernier was a son of the painters Géo Bernier and Jenny Hoppe. He also worked at the French Academy of Brussels. Bernier was a member of the group Les Synthétistes. Other members of this group included : Francis de Bourguignon, Théo De Joncker, Marcel Poot, Maurice Schoemaker, Jules Strens and Robert Otlet. Bernier became a member of the Royal Flemish Academy in 1963.

== Compositions ==
=== Orchestral works ===
- 1945 Epitaphe symphonique for orchestra
- 1948 Ode à une Madone for orchestra
- 1952 Le tombeau devant l'Escaut for orchestra
- 1956 Le bal des ombres ou danses parodiques for orchestra
- 1957 Symphoniette for strings orchestra
- 1970 Menestrandie for violin and orchestra
- 1970 Tanagras for orchestra

=== Works for brassband ===
- 1954 Hymne de Paix
- 1958/1964 Hommage à Sax for alto-saxophone and brassband
- 1959 Le tombeau devant l'Escaut for brassband
- 1969 Danse parodiques for brassband
- 1961 Épitaphe II for brassband
- 1981 Fanfare Du Triton for brass and percution

=== Chambermusic ===
- 1943 Sonatina for violin and viola
- 1956 Bassonnerie for bassoon and piano
- 1960 Reverdies for clarinet and piano
- 1962 Offrande à Erard for harp
- 1973 Suite pour le plaisir de l'oreille for saxophone quartet
- 1980 Parabole for viola and piano

=== Choirworks ===
- 1939 Sabots de la Vierge for choir with 4 mixed voices a capella - text: Maurice Carême
- 1940 Liturgies for mixed choir a cappella - text: Paul Verlaine
- 1947 Hymne de paix for mixed choir a capella - text: Maurice Carême
- 1951 Du coq à l'âne - nº1 for mixed choir a capella - text: Maurice Carême
- 1951 Du coq à l'âne - nº2 for mixed choir a capella - text: Maurice Carême
- 1951 Du coq à l'âne - nº3 for mixed choir a capella - text: Maurice Carême
- 1951 Du coq à l'âne - nº4 for mixed choir a capella - text: Maurice Carême
- 1951 Du coq à l'âne - nº5 for mixed choir a capella - text: Maurice Carême
- 1951 Du coq à l'âne - nº6 for mixed choir a capella - text: Maurice Carême
- 1951 Du coq à l'âne - nº7 for mixed choir a capella - text: Maurice Carême
- 1968 Chants incantatoires for 4 mixed voices a capella - text: Géo Libbrecht

=== Vocal music ===
- 1924 Poèmes exotiques for soprano and piano - text: Thou Fou
- 1925 Entrevisions for soprano and piano - text: Charles van Lerberghe
- 1927 Trois quatrains pour ma mie for middle voice and piano - text: R. Denobele
- 1931 Le blé est blond for soprano and piano - text: Maurice Carême
- 1936 Éternité for middle voice and piano - text: Franz Hellens
- 1941 Evasions for middle voice and piano - text: Maurice Quoilin
- 1942 Présages for soprano and piano - text: Auguste Marin
- 1944 Chanson archaïque for middle voice and piano or harp - text: Maurice Maeterlinck
- 1944 Dévotions for soprano and piano - text: Maurice Carême
- 1948 Eclaircies for high voice and orchestra - text: Franz Hellens
- 1952 Le cerisier extrait du 2ème recueil des Sortilèges ingénus for mezzo-soprano and piano - text: Maurice Carême
- 1956 Fantaisie de tous les temps for middle voice and piano - text: Lucienne Desnoues
- 1964 Chanson marine for low voice and orchestra - text: Edmond Vandercammen
- 1979 Parabole chantée for contra-alto and piano
- Agnus dei for middle voice and organ
- Ecoute, d'autres femmes... for soprano, clarinet and piano - text: Franz Hellens
- Le poète et l'oiseau for soprano or tenor, clarinet and piano - text: Armand Bernier

=== Works for organ ===
- 1947 Hymne de paix for grand organ

=== Works for piano ===
- 1927 Berceuse divine
- 1930 Humoresque dans le style galant
- 1976 Epitaphe sonore for two pianos
- 1978 Danses parodiques for two pianos
- 1980 Soliloques (No.1 en forme de Nocturne, No.2 en forme de Novelette)
- 1981 Le clavier chantant
- Complainte du "Petit Chose" (Feuille d'album)
- Le jardin secret (Moment lyrique)

== Publication ==
- In memoriam Gaston Brenta, Académie Royale de Belgique. Bulletin de la Classe des Beaux-Arts. 51 (1969), S. 151–155.

== Sources ==
- Francis Pieters: Grootmeesters van de Simfonie en de Blaasmuziek - De Sythetisten, in: FEDEKAMNIEUWS Tweemaandelijks orgaan van de Fedekam Vlaanderen, 27th volume, nr. 3- June 1982, pp. 178–181
- Francis Pieters: Portrettengalerij - René Bernier, in: FEDEKAMNIEUWS Tweemaandelijks orgaan van de Fedekam Vlaanderen, 25th volume, 1980, pp. 508–509
- Diana von Volborth-Danys: CeBeDeM et ses compositeurs affilies : biographies, catalogues, discographie, Bruxelles: Centre belge de documentation musicale, 1977. Vol. I : A-L : 1977 : 211 p.; Vol. II : M-Z : 1980 : 276 p.
- Karel De Schrijver: Bibliografie der belgische toonkunstenaars sedert 1800, Leuven: Vlaamse, 1958, 152 p.
- Music in Belgium : contemporary Belgian composers, Brussels: Manteau, 1964, 158 p.
- Charles Leirens: Belgian music, New York: Belgian Government Information Center, 1963
- Jozef Robijns, Miep Zijlstra: Algemene muziekencyclopedie, Haarlem: De Haan, (1979)-1984, ISBN 978-90-228-4930-9
- Wolfgang Suppan, Armin Suppan: Das Neue Lexikon des Blasmusikwesens, 4. Auflage, Freiburg-Tiengen, Blasmusikverlag Schulz GmbH, 1994, ISBN 3-923058-07-1
- Jean-Marie Londeix: Musique pour saxophone, volume II : repertoire general des oeuvres et des ouvrages d'enseignement pour le saxophone, Cherry Hill: Roncorp Publications, 1985
- Jean-Marie Londeix: 125 ans de musique pour saxophone, Paris: Leduc, 1971
- Harry R. Gee: Clarinet solos de concours 1897-1980 - An annotated bibliography, Bloomington, Indiana: Indiana University Press, c1981., viii, 118 p., ISBN 0-253-13577-X
- Paul Frank, Burchard Bulling, Florian Noetzel, Helmut Rosner: Kurzgefasstes Tonkünstler Lexikon - Zweiter Teil: Ergänzungen und Erweiterungen seit 1937, 15. Aufl., Wilhelmshaven: Heinrichshofen, Band 1: A-K. 1974. ISBN 3-7959-0083-2; Band 2: L-Z. 1976. ISBN 3-7959-0087-5
- Storm Bull: Index to biographies of contemporary composers, Vol. II, Metuchen, N.J.: Scarecrow Press, 1974, 567 p., ISBN 0-8108-0734-3
- John Vinton: Dictionary of contemporary music, New York: E.P. Dutton, 1974, 834 p., ISBN 978-0525091257
- Marc Honneger: Dictionnaire de la musique, Paris: Bordas, 1970–76
- Zenei lexikon, Budapest: Zenemukiado Vallalat, 1965
- P. Townend: Who's who in music and musicians' international directory 1962, New York: Hafner Publishing Co., 1962, 331 p.
