= Théo De Joncker =

Belgian composer (1894–1964)

Théo De Joncker (11 April 1894, in Brussels – 12 July 1964, in Asse) was a Belgian composer.

== Biography ==
Théo De Joncker was a student of August de Boeck and Paul Gilson. For years he conducted the orchestra of the Belgian National Radio (NIR), but he also enjoyed a conducting career outside of Belgium. As a composer, he belonged to the Brussels group Les Synthétistes. This group was found by students of Paul Gilson as a way to celebrate their teacher's 60th birthday and included Francis de Bourguignon, Théo De Joncker, Marcel Poot, Maurice Schoemaker, Jules Strens, René Bernier, and Robert Otlet.

== Compositions ==
=== Orchestral works ===
- 1917 Filosofische gedachten van een draaiorgelspeler for orchestra
- 1918 Hedda Gabler for orchestra
- 1927 Breugeliaansche schets for orchestra
- 1939 Sinfonia burlesca for orchestra
- 1939 Sinfonie im klassischen Stil for orchestra
- 1943 Symfonie nr.3 for orchestra
- 1944 Muzikaal portret van Bernard Shaw for orchestra
- Allegro for chamber orchestra
- Boere-Charleston for tenor and orchestra - text: Paul van Ostayen
- Cello Concerto for cello and orchestra
- De laatste oogenblikken van Lodewijk XI for small orchestra
- Don Quichotte rêve... for orchestra
- Fantasia - Serenata for flute and orchestra
- Historiette pour bébé for strings
- Introduction et rondo capricio for bassoon and orchestra
- Le glas for orchestra
- Rapsodie vénézuélienne for orchestra
- Sérénade for violin and orchestra
- Symfonische proloog for orchestra
- Vlaamse dans I for orchestra

=== Brassband works ===
- Chant mystique, for brass band
- Charles Stratton, comical fairytale for brass band
- Deux Extraits du Jardin des Supplices, based on a novel by Octave Mirbeau
- Gamineries - Guitenstreken, for brassband
- Marche, for brassband
- Polomé, for brassband
- For Paul Gilson, for brassband

=== Choir works ===
- Ach, mijn bietje, jij zingt zo schone for mixed choir and piano - text: Guido Gezelle
- Anneessens for mixed choir and piano - text: Frans de Cort
- Daer ging een pater langs het land for male or female choir and piano
- De mei for choir a cappella - text: G. W. Loovendael
- De pen for mixed choir and piano - text: Jan A. Van Droogenbroeck
- Des winters als het reghent for male or female choir and piano
- Minnekepoes for choir a cappella - text: Jan A. Van Droogenbroeck

=== Chamber music ===
- 1917 Conte pour quatuor for flute, oboe, clarinet and bassoon
- 1917 Novelette pour trio for flute, oboe and viola
- 1938 Drie vertelseltjes for oboe, clarinet, bassoon and horn
- 1963 Concerto for flute, oboe, clarinet, bassoon and horn in F
- Prélude for oboe, clarinet, bassoon and horn
- Quintette for flute, oboe, clarinet, horn and bassoon

=== Vocal music with orchestra or instruments ===
- 1927 Verselets à mon premier né for tenor and orchestra - text: Clotilde de Surville
- 1938 De messias for Recitant and piano - text: Dirk Vansina
- De Vlaming staat zijn eigen taal en zeden af for mezzo-soprano and orchestra - text: Guido Gezelle
- De wilde jacht for mezzo-soprano and orchestra - text: Willem Gijssels
- Eerste boek van Schmol for middle voice and orchestra - text: Paul van Ostayen
- Hei da lieve dreupel water for mezzo-soprano and orchestra - text: Guido Gezelle
- Het meezennestje for soprano and orchestra - text: Guido Gezelle
- Het zonnelied van Achnaton for Recitant and piano - text: J. Coutrijn
- Morgenstond for alto and orchestra - text: Guido Gezelle
- O Mocht ik for mezzo-soprano and orchestra - text: Guido Gezelle
- Slaapt, slaapt, kindje slaapt for soprano, mixed choir and piano ad. libitum - text: Guido Gezelle
- Stilleven for mezzo-soprano and orchestra - text: Staf Van der Loo
- Tot de Mane for mezzo-soprano and orchestra - text: Guido Gezelle
- Winden gingen te rust for mezzo-soprano and orchestra - text: Wies Moens
- Wintermuggen for soprano and orchestra - text: Guido Gezelle
- Zonnezoen for soprano and orchestra - text: Jef Mennekens

=== Works for piano ===
- 1915 Le chien qui lache sa proie pour l'ombre
- 1915 Le renard et les raisins
- Eille - Walsje
- Esquisse sur le nom "ANNA"
- Gaminerie
- Il s'éveille.
- Pianowerken
- Pièce pour piano sur le nom de Fauré
- Vlaamse dans

== Sources ==
- Francis Pieters: Grootmeesters van de Simfonie en de Blaasmuziek - De Sythetisten, in: FEDEKAMNIEUWS Tweemaandelijks orgaan van de Fedekam Vlaanderen, 27th volume, nr. 3- June 1982, pp. 178–181
- Karel De Schrijver: Bibliografie der Belgische Toonkunstenaars sedert 1800, Leuven : Vlaamse Drukkerij, 1958, 152 p.
- Jozef Robijns, Miep Zijlstra: Algemene muziekencyclopedie, Haarlem: De Haan, (1979)-1984, ISBN 978-90-228-4930-9
- Franz Stieger: Opernlexikon - Teil II: Komponisten. 1, Band A-F, Tutzing: Hans Schneider, 1975–1983, 371 p., ISBN 3-7952-0203-5
- Franz Stieger: Opernlexikon - Teil II: Komponisten. 2, Band G-M, Tutzing: Hans Schneider, 1975–1983, 373-772 p., ISBN 3-7952-0228-0
- Paul Frank, Burchard Bulling, Florian Noetzel, Helmut Rosner: Kurzgefasstes Tonkünstler Lexikon - Zweiter Teil: Erganzungen und Erweiterungen seit 1937, 15. Aufl., Wilhelmshaven: Heinrichshofen, Band 1: A-K. 1974. ISBN 3-7959-0083-2; Band 2: L-Z. 1976. ISBN 3-7959-0087-5
- Storm Bull: Index to biographies of contemporary composers, Vol. II, Metuchen, N.J.: Scarecrow Press, 1974, 567 p., ISBN 0-8108-0734-3
- Jean-Marie Londeix: 125 ans de musique pour saxophone, Paris: Leduc, 1971
