= Les Synthétistes =

Les Synthétistes were a group of Belgian composers whose goal was to synthesize the modern musical tendencies starting in 1925. Drawing mainly on the influence of Ravel, Stravinsky, Hindemith and Honegger, the group's aesthetic was broadly neo-classical. Of its members, Marcel Poot achieved the widest general recognition.

All of them were ex-pupils of the Belgian composer Paul Gilson and started the organization as a way to celebrate their teacher's 60th birthday in 1925. Their first act was to publish the magazine La Revue Musicale Belge. The group aspired to be a Belgian counterpart to the famous French composing group Les Six.

The first concert devoted to these synthesists took place in December 1929 and was directed by Constant Moreau. Their first big official concert took place on the 27th of Februari 1930 in the Royal Conservatory of Brussels. It was played by the Groot Harmonieorkest van de Belgische Gidsen and conducted by Arthur Prévost.

== Members ==
- René Bernier (1905–1984)
- Francis de Bourguignon (1890–1961), his works include the Piano Concertino, op. 99 (1952)
- Gaston Brenta (1902–1969), composed Matinée d’été in 1968
- Théo De Joncker (1894–1964)
- Robert Otlet (1889–1948)
- Marcel Poot (1901–1988), composer of Vrolijke: Ouverture joyeuse (1934)
- Maurice Schoemaker (1890–1964), known for the symphonic poem Vuurwerk (a.k.a. Feux d’artifice, 1922)
- Jules Strens (1893–1971), best known for Danse funambulesque (1929)
