= Jenny Hoppe =

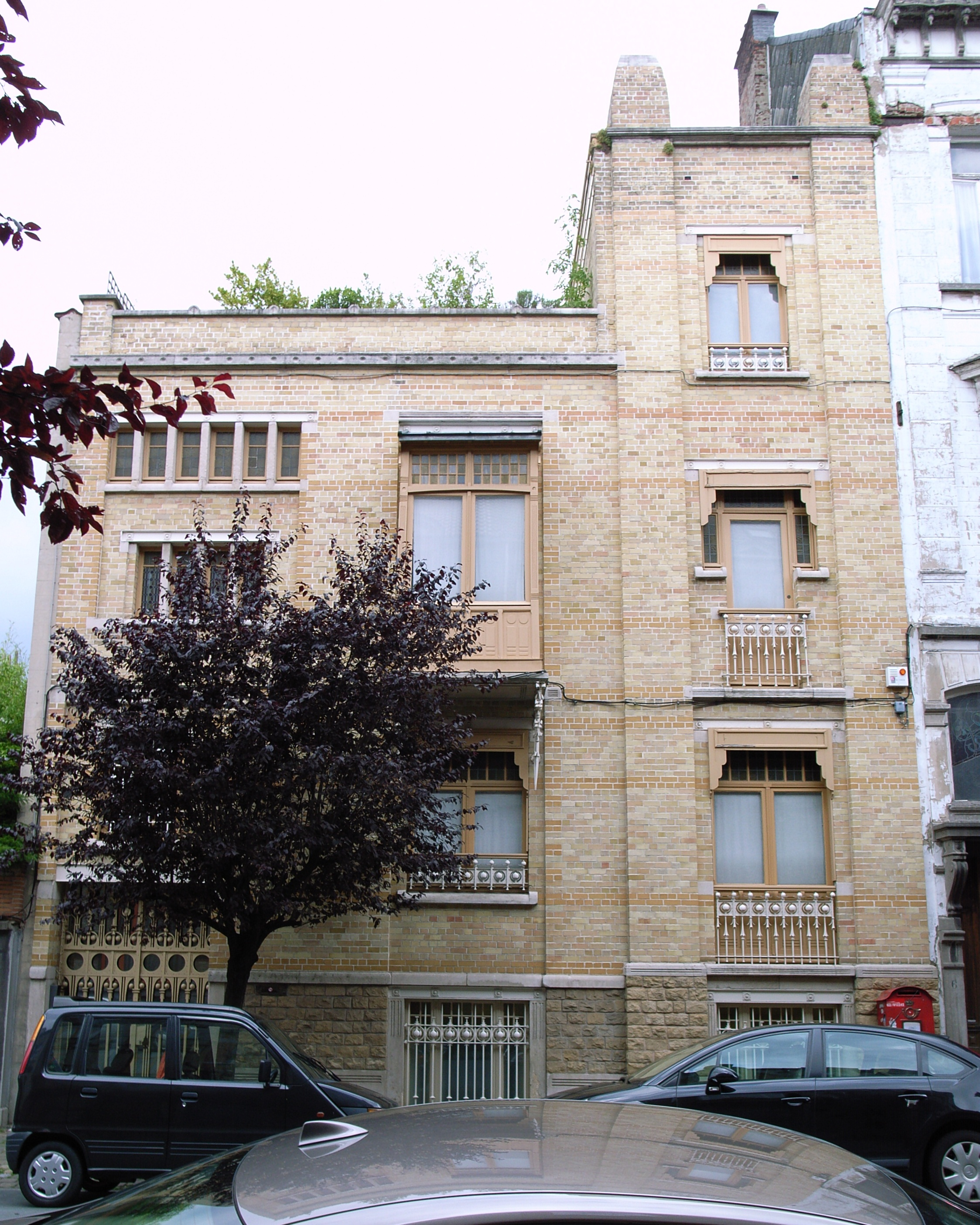
Hervormingsstraat 4

Jenny Hoppe (1870–1924) was a German-Belgian painter who painted portraits, landscapes, interiors, flowers, swastikas, and still lifes in a Post-Impressionistic style.

== Life ==
Hoppe was born in Düsseldorf, the daughter of the designer and medallist Edouard Hoppe and the sister of the painter Cathérine Hoppe (Ketty Hoppe), who was married to the painter Victor Gilsoul. In 1887 Jenny Hoppe married the painter Géo Bernier and her work is therefore sometimes found under the name "Jenny Bernier-Hoppe".

Both sisters received artistic training in the Institut Bischoffsheim in Brussels, which admitted women, unlike the Académie Royale des Beaux-Arts.Hoppe painted portraits, landscapes, interiors, flowers and still lifes in a Post-Impressionistic style.

She took part in the Brussels Salons from 1890. She also exhibited in Antwerp in 1898.

Géo Bernier and Jenny Hoppe lived at Hervormingsstraat 4 in Ixelles, in a house designed by Alban Chambon. The building has been protected since 1997.

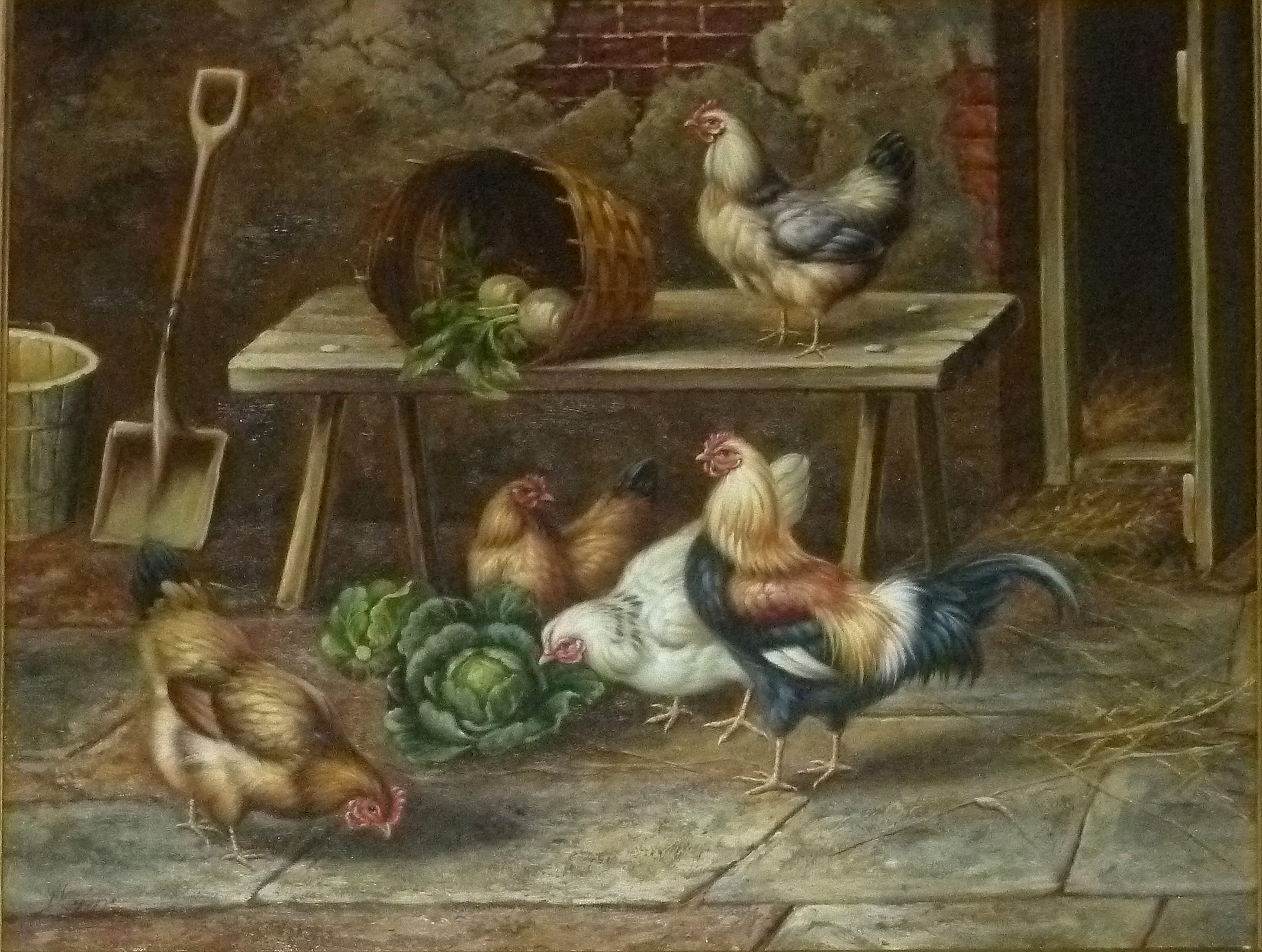
De kippenfamilie

She was the mother of an ephemeral mayor of Saint-Gilles, Fernand Bernier.

In 2007 the Charlier Museum featured her work in the exhibition "Vrouwelijke Zinnen".
