= Jean Brusselmans =

Belgian painter (1884–1953)

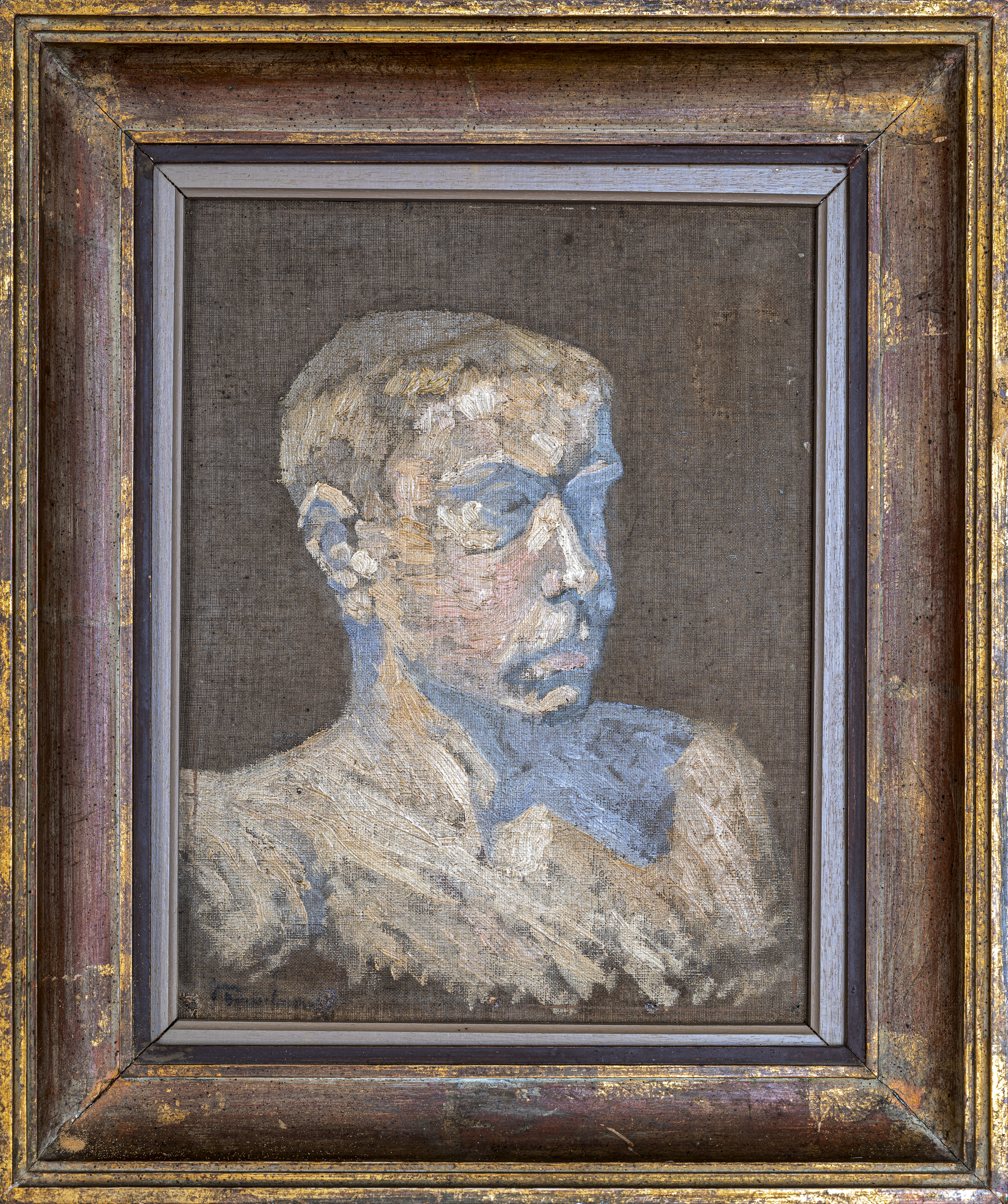
- Self-portrait (1911)
- Born: Jean Brusselmans; 13 June 1884; Brussels, Belgium
- Died: 9 January 1953 (aged 68); Dilbeek
- Occupation: Painter
- Movement: Flemish Expressionism
- Relatives: Michel Brusselmans (brother)

Jean Brusselmans (1884-1953) was a Belgian painter. He developed his own style and, whereas he is often considered a representative of Flemish Expressionism, he refused to associate himself with any art movement. He was not very well known during his life, and had difficulties selling his work, but posthumously he was recognized as one of important Belgian painters of the 20th century.

== Bio ==
Brusselmans we born on 13 June 1884 in Brussels. His parents were running a sewing workshop. He had three siblings; his younger brother Michel Brusselmans became a composer.

== Exhibitions ==
- 1942, Mannheim, Kunsthalle, Flämische Graphik der Gegenwart, Stadt with Deutsch-Vlämischen Arbeitsgemeinschaft DE.VL.AG (12/1942 - 1/1943) (cat. 21 - 23)
- 2018, Gemeentemuseum, The Hague, The Netherlands.
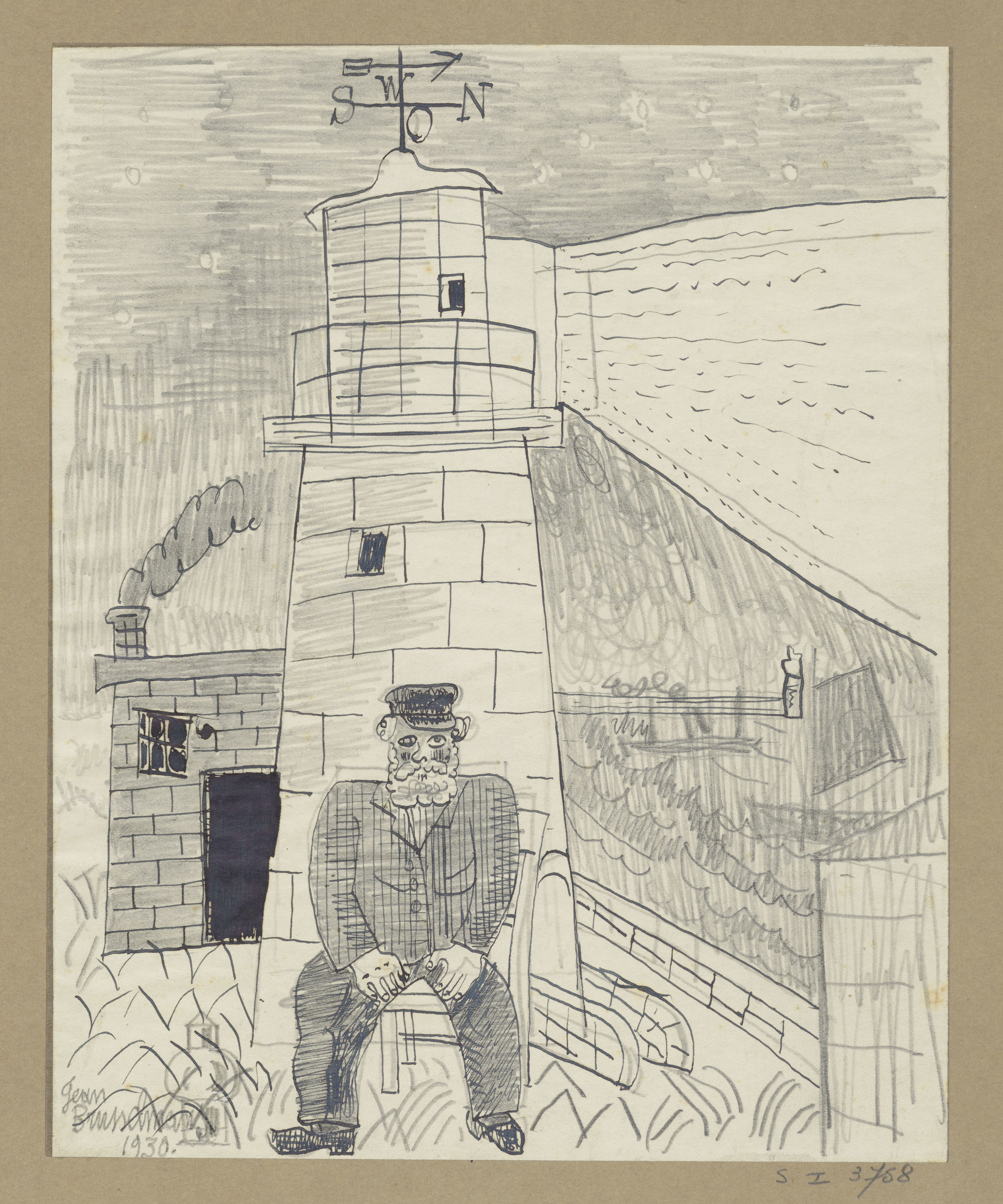
The Lighthouse

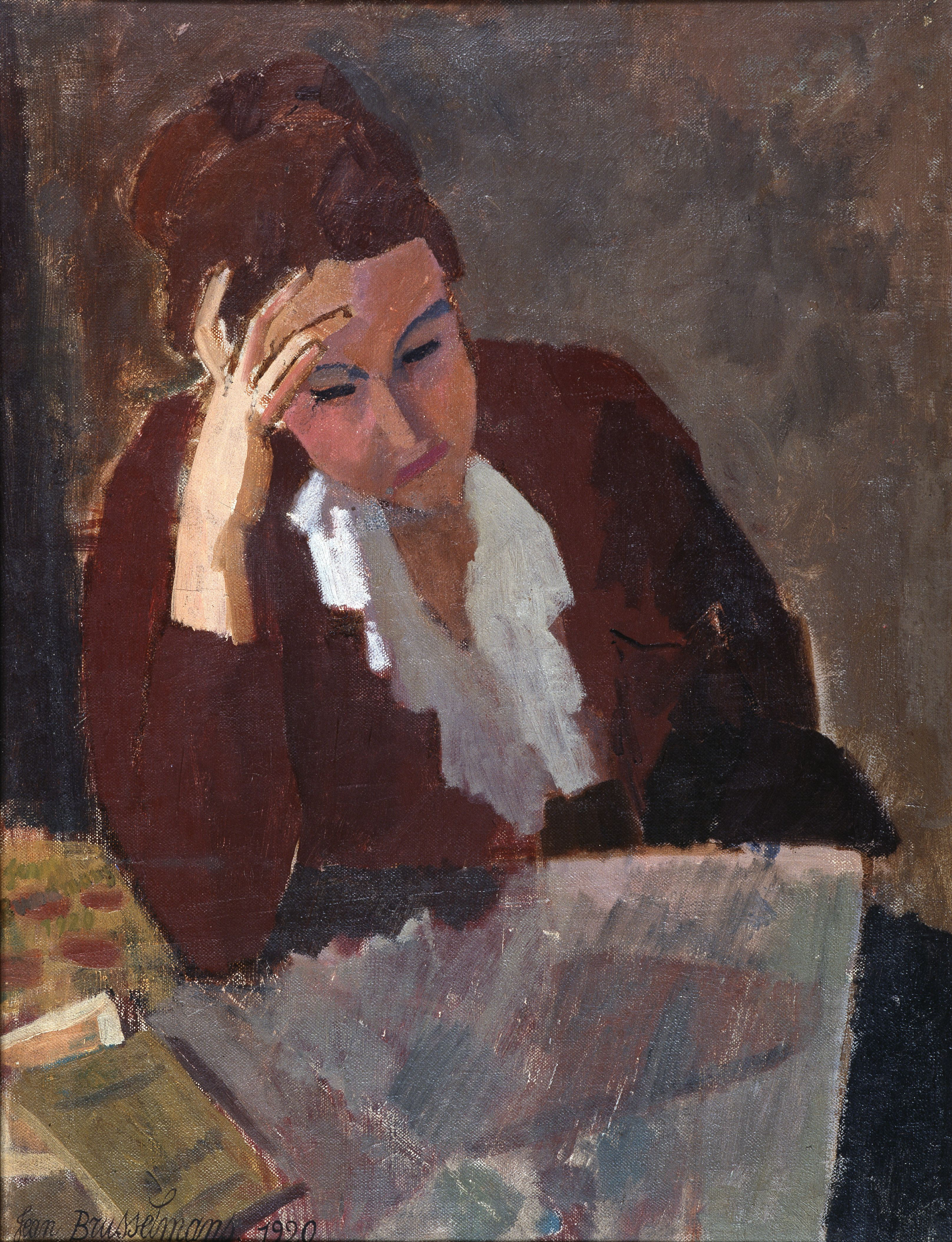
Leaning woman

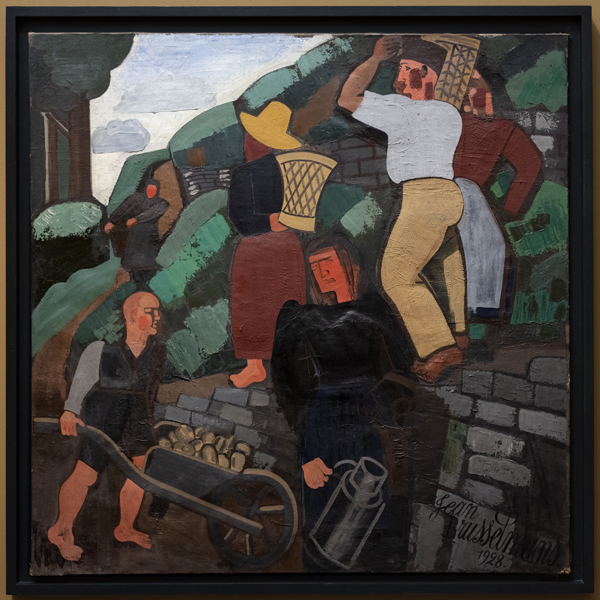
Farmers

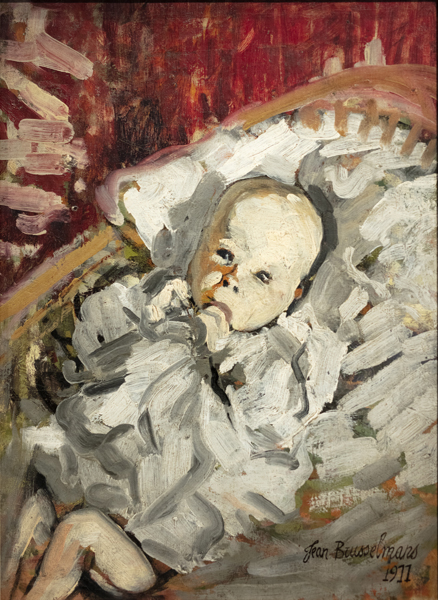
Child in a cradle

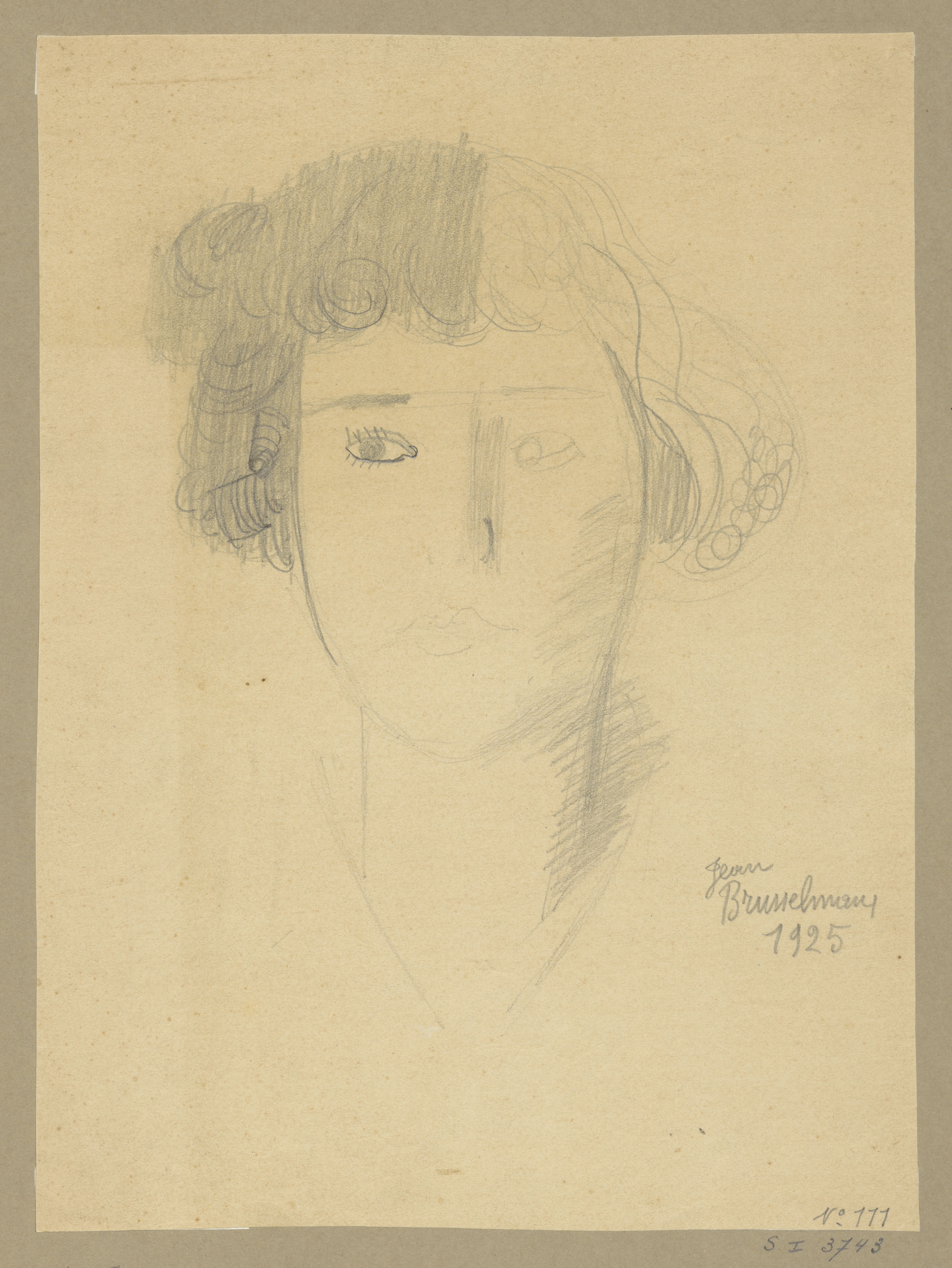
Woman's head

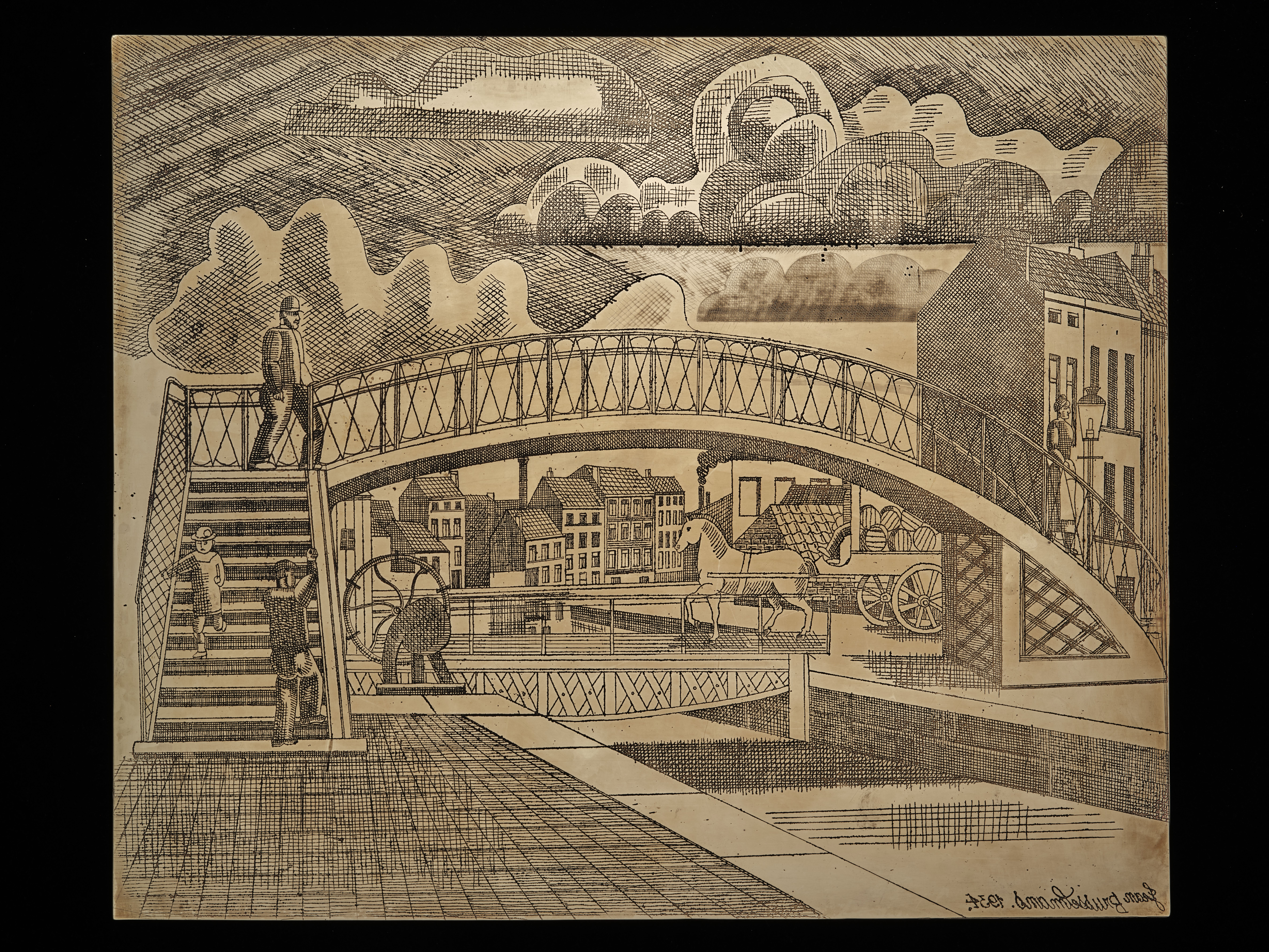
Near a canal
