= Paul Gilson =

Belgian musician and composer (1865 - 1942)

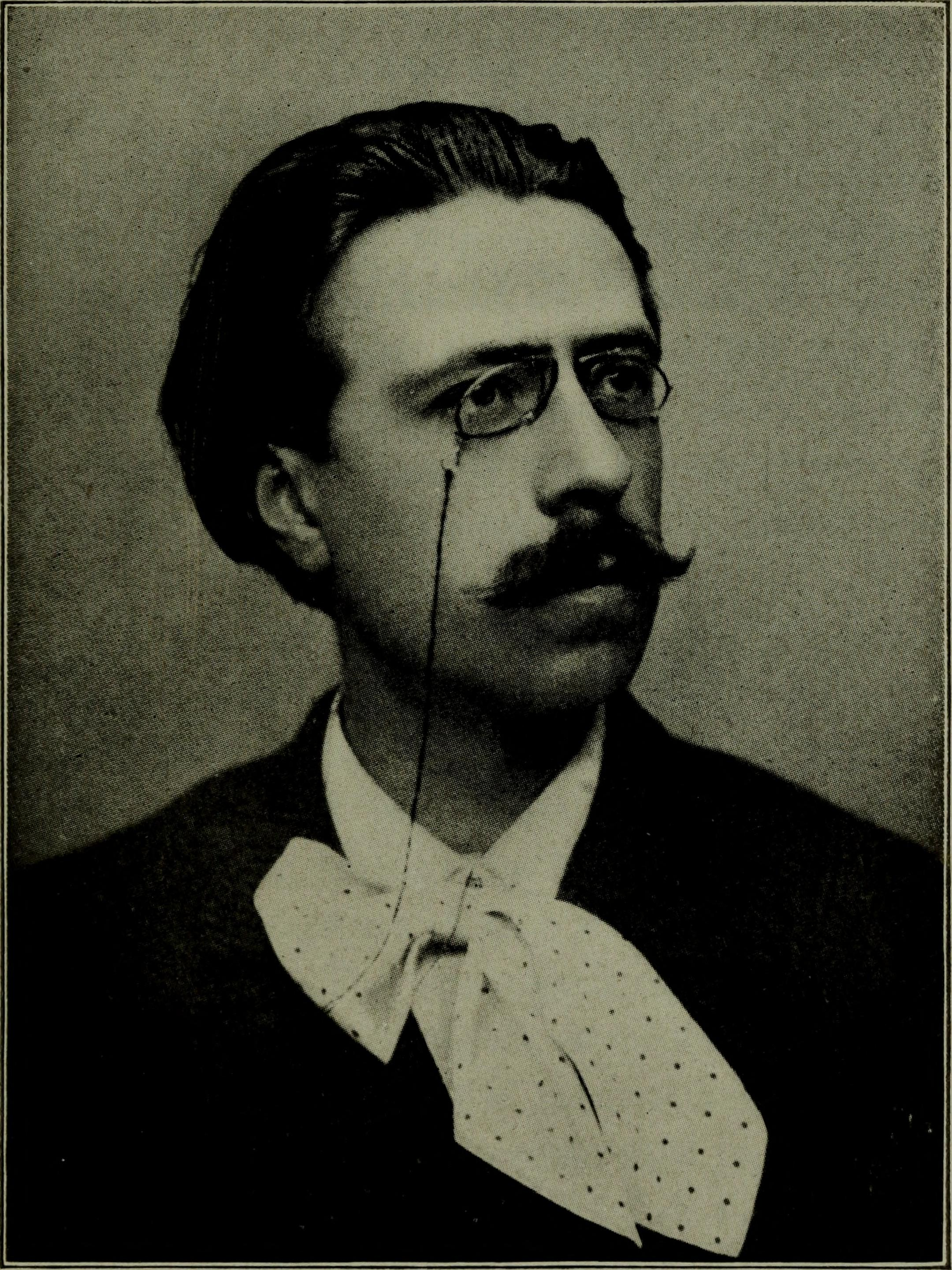
Paul Gilson in 1905

Paul Gilson (Brussels, 15 June 1865 – Brussels, 3 April 1942) was a Belgian musician and composer.

== Biography ==
Paul Gilson was born in Brussels. In 1866, his family moved to Ruisbroek in the Belgian province of Brabant. There he studied theory with the organist and choir director Auguste Cantillon, and began writing works for orchestra and choir. His first official training came from 1887 to 1889 under François-Auguste Gevaert in composition and under Charles Duyck in harmony and counterpoint at the Brussels Conservatory, and in 1889, he was awarded the Belgian Prix de Rome for a cantata, Sinaï, which was very well received. As the winner of the prize he was able to spend time in Bayreuth (1892), Paris (1893–4) and Italy (1895).

A large orchestral work, La mer, which was first performed in Brussels on 20 March 1892, established Gilson as a national musical figure and also gave him success abroad, though not in Paris.

In 1899 he became professor of composition at the Brussels Conservatory; he won the same post at Antwerp in 1904 but quit both after becoming inspector of music education in 1909, a post he would keep until 1930. Although he was a very prolific composer, his output decreased after 1905, after which Gilson wrote increasingly about music, in theory, criticism, and composition. One of his pupils was composer and violinist Georgios Poniridis.

In 1925, a group of Gilson's students who called themselves Les Synthétistes (including René Bernier, Francis de Bourguignon, Théo De Joncker, Marcel Poot, Maurice Schoemaker, Jules Strens and Robert Otlet) first formed, declaring allegiance to Gilson's ideas about music. Along with Poot and Schoemaker, he founded La revue belge musicale in 1924; he was the chief editor until it folded in 1939. He also wrote pamphlets for Belgian radio.

Gilson corresponded regularly with Russian composers César Cui and Mitrofan Belyayev. He died in his native city of Brussels.

== Honours ==
- 1932 : commander in the Order of Leopold.

== Music ==
Gilson was somewhat conservative in his musical outlook. Some of his work is indebted to Wagnerian harmony, and his books on harmony and instrumentation also bear this out.

La Mer, the score which gave him his greatest success, is a set of four impressionistic movements ("symphonic sketches") in sonata form which were originally intended to illustrate verses by a French-speaking poet, Eddy Levis. Generally considered to form a programmatic symphony depicting the sea, Gilson's score (also known as De Zee) predated Claude Debussy's work of the same name by a decade. Despite being finely crafted, his later works such as the oratorio Francesca da Rimini tended to be somewhat conventional, lacking the originality displayed in the orchestration of La Mer. An exception is the brilliant Variations symphoniques (originally scored for brass ensemble), which is also the composer's only major work without literary associations.

== Works ==
=== For orchestra ===
- 1890 Alla Marcia rhapsody for string orchestra
- 1890 Rhapsodie à la marcia
- 1892 La Mer 4 Symphonic sketches
  1. Lever de soleil
  2. Chants et danses de matelots
  3. Crépuscule
  4. Tempête
- 1892–1893 Mélodies écossaises for string orchestra
  1. The Flowers Of The Forest
  2. Sweet May Morning
  3. Jig And Song
- 1900 Ouverture symphonique Nr. 1
- Alvar
- 1902 Premier Concerto for Alto Saxophone
- 1902 Deuxième Concerto for Alto Saxophone
- 1903 Variations symphoniques for large orchestra (adapted from the first version for brass ensemble)
- 1903 Ouverture symphonique Nr. 2
- 1904 Ouverture symphonique No. 3
- 1910 Inaugural Fanfare for the Coronation of Albert I
- 1929 Parafrazen op vlaamse volksliederen
- Sailors Dance

=== For wind orchestra ===
- 1891 Fantaisie canadienne (Published by Breitkopf & Härtel as Fantasie über kanadische Volksweisen in 1898)
- 1903 Variation symphonique for brass instruments
- 1892/1925 La Mer 4 Symphonic Sketches for wind orchestra transcribed by Arthur Prevost
  1. Lever de soleil
  2. Chants et danses de matelots
  3. Crépuscule
  4. Tempête
- 1930 Tornacum
- 1930 Grande marche du Centenaire
- 1948 Moeder for speaker and fanfare orchestra
- Binche
- Brabant – marche militaire
- Danse guerrière from the ballet La Captive
- Deuxième rhapsodie
- Deuxième valse symphonique
- Encore un ! allegro
- Epithalame
- Gavotte Monsignore
- Hommage à Weber
- Interlude solennel
- L'heureux voyage
- Le retour au pays : Prière avant le départ
- Marche commémorative
- Marche cortège
- Marche panégyrique
- Merxem – Allegro militaire
- Montréal – Allegro de concert
- Ouverture »Eleusines«
- Patrouille albanaise
- Poème symphonique en forme d'ouverture
- Polka fantaisiste
- Rhapsodie laudative
- Rhapsodie hawaïenne
- Richard III Ouverture
- Terugkeer naar het vaderland
- Triumph Marsch
- Variations
- Valse symphonique nr. 1
- Valse symphonique nr. 2
- Vestris – Danse mimique
- Quarantenaire – Marche solennelle

=== Stage works ===
- 1890 Le démon Dramatic cantata on a text by Lermontov in 2 acts for soloists, choir and orchestra
- 1892 Francesca da Rimini Dramatic oratorio based on a text by Dante for soloists, choir and orchestra
- 1895 Gens de mer (Zeevolk) Lyric drama in 2 acts
- 1896–1900 La captive Ballet in 2 acts
- 1903 Princesse Rayon de Soleil (Prinses Zonneschijn), légende féerique en quatre actes
- 1910 Les aventuriers (Rooversliefde) Musical drama in 1 act
- 1910–1921 Les deux bossus, ballet-Pantomime in 1 Act
- 1940 Elijah Music for a play by Cyriel Verschaeve
- Daphné Ballett

=== Other works ===
- 1889–1890 Six mélodies
- 1902 Petite suite rustique for piano
- 1934 Le mas d'Icare for a film by Carlo Queeckers for string orchestra
- 1926 Sonatina for carillon
- 1934–1936 Romantische werkjes
- 1940 Aria di Timpani con 6 Variazioni
- Suite nocturne for piano
- Six chansons écossaises based on a text by Leconte de Lisle

=== Arrangements ===
- Scheherazade arrangement of the symphonic suite by Nicolai Rimsky-Korsakov for solo piano

=== Books and writings ===
- 1913 Le Tutti orchestral
- 1923 Traité de lecture musicale
- 1923 Traité d'harmonie (3 Bände)
- 1926 Traité de musique militaire
- Solfège – Cours complet de la lecture musicale en neuf volumes
- 1942 Notes de musique et souvenirs (memoirs)
- 1955 Arthur Meulemans: Paul Gilson (1865–1942)
