= Maurice Carême =

Belgian poet

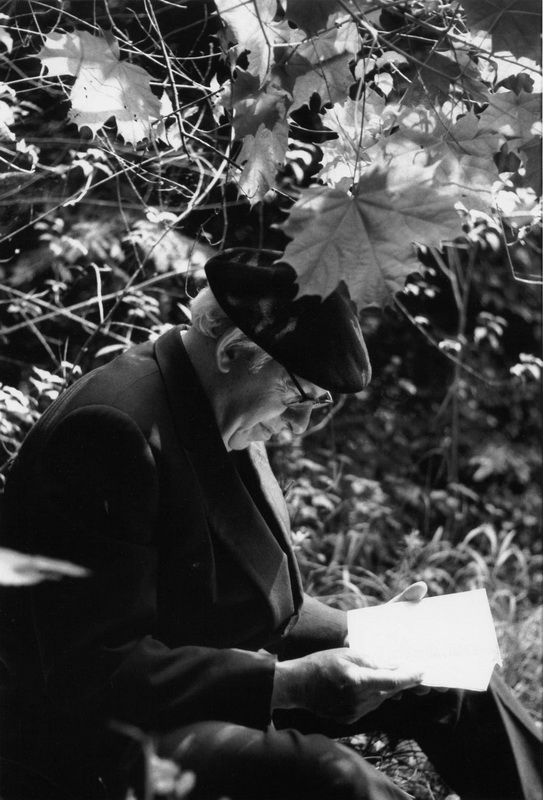
- Maurice Carême, summer 1969 photo: Jeannine Burny
- Born: 12 May 1899; Wavre, Belgium
- Died: 13 January 1978 (aged 78); Anderlecht, Belgium
- Occupation: poet

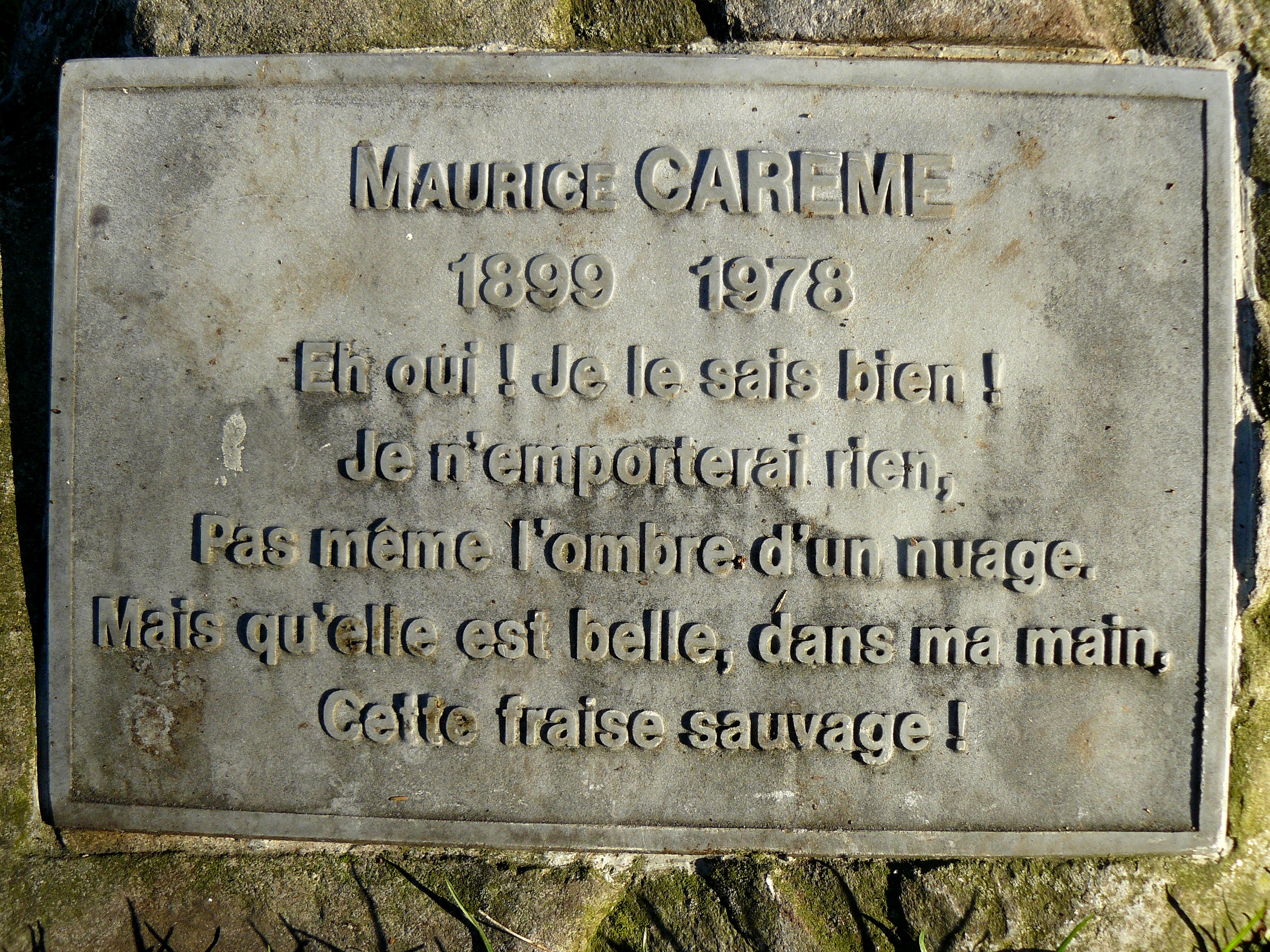
Commemoration of Maurice Carême in Paris. The text reads: Eh oui ! Je le sais bien ! Je n'emporterai rien, Pas même l'ombre d'un nuage. Mais qu'elle est belle, dans ma main, Cette fraise sauvage! Eh yes ! I know it well ! I will not take anything, Not even the shadow of a cloud. But how beautiful, in my hand, This wild strawberry!

Maurice Carême (French pronunciation: [mɔʁis kaʁɛm]; 12 May 1899 – 13 January 1978) was a Belgian francophone poet, best known for his simple writing style and children's poetry. His work was part of the literature event in the art competition at the 1928 Summer Olympics.

== Life and career ==
Carême was born in Walloon Brabant in Wavre, then a rural part of Belgium. Although he grew up in a family of modest means – his father was a housepainter, and his mother a shopkeeper. Carême had a happy childhood, which would be reflected in his work.

Carême attended school in his hometown, and in 1914 was awarded a scholarship to attend Normal School in Tienen. It was at this time that he began writing poetry. In 1918, he graduated from Normal School and was assigned a primary school teacher's position in Anderlecht, near Brussels.

Carême's poetry progressively took on a greater place in his life, and in 1943 he resigned from his teaching profession to commit himself fully to writing. He also translated works of Dutch poets into French.

Carême died in Anderlecht. At his request, he was buried in Wavre. His wife died in 1990. His home in Anderlecht, "La Maison Blanche", now houses the Musée Maurice Carême.

== Music ==
Many of his poems have been set to music, by Darius Milhaud, Francis Poulenc, Henri Sauguet, Jacques Chailley (1910–1999), Florent Schmitt, Carl Orff, Fabrice Boulanger, or Norbert Rosseau (1907–1975): L'Eau passe, a cycle of songs for 3 soloists, piano, harp and strings, 1954).

== Bibliography ==
- Maurice Nicoulin, Hommage à Maurice Carême, Vevey, Éditions Delta, 1978.
- Jacques Charles, Maurice Carême, coll. « Poètes d'aujourd'hui », Pierre Seghers éditeur, Paris, 1965
- Pierre Coran, Maurice Carême, collection Portraits, Pierre De Meyere éditeur, Bruxelles, 1966
- Jeannine Burny, « Le jour s'en va toujours trop tôt » : Sur les pas de Maurice Carême, Racine, 2007 ISBN 9782873865016
