= Michel Brusselmans =

Belgian composer

Michel Brusselmans (Paris, 12 February 1886 – Brussels, 20 September 1960) was a Belgian composer.

== Biography ==
Michel Brusselmans was born in a Belgian family that had settled in Paris and was the younger brother of the painter Jean Brusselmans. He studied at the Royal Conservatory of Brussels with Gustave Huberti and Edgar Tinel, and completed his studies with Vincent d’Indy and Paul Gilson. In 1911 Brusselmans won the Prix de Rome. He wished to have a career as a violinist and a conductor, but had to give up this dream because of an eye defect.

In 1921, Brusselmans moved to Paris where he worked for Édouard Salabert, a music publisher who agreed to publish Brusselmans’ compositions in exchange for doing household chores. Later, Brusselmans also composed music for silent films for Salabert, of which his best known piece was written for The Mummy in 1932.

During the Second World War, he was forced to return to Brussels, where he had to work for Sender Brüssel, the broadcast of the German occupier. After the war, he returned to France and later moved to Spain, where he settled in Alicante.

Brusselmans composed orchestral music, chamber music, songs, choir music, theater scores, radio works and movie scores. His oeuvre is impressionistic; the majority consists of program music.

== Sources ==
- Biography of Michel Brusselmans at SVM
- List of works of Michel Brusselmans at CeBeDeM
