= Dick (surname) =

Origin
- Meaning: son of "Richard"
- Region of origin: Scotland, North East England

Other names
- Variant forms: Dick, Dixon, Dickson, Richardson, Richards, Richard

Dick is used as a surname in English, German and other languages. In English, the surname is patronymic based on the use of Dick as a first name, meaning 'son of Dick' or 'son of Richard', just like Dickson. The name can also be based on the use of the Middle English words dich, diche, dik, dike 'ditch' as a place name description. In German, surnames with the form Dick has arisen through different sources: the adjective dick 'plump', the noun Dickicht 'thicket' used about someone living in such a location, as a patronymic surname based on Dick used as a first name or nickname, or as a variant of Dieck.

It is the 1,513th most common name in Great Britain with 6,545 bearers. Although found in every part of Britain, the form Dick is especially common in Scotland, and it was from there, in the 17th century, that the surname was taken to Northern Ireland. It is most common in West Lothian, where it is the 78th most common surname with 1,742 bearers. Other notable concentrations include Northumberland (146th, 1,630), Tyne and Wear (335th, 1,738), Berkshire (365th, 1,704), and in Norfolk.

Currently, in the U.S., it ranks at 1,718 out of 162,253 surnames.

== Notable people ==
=== A–K ===
- Adi Dick (born 1978), New Zealand singer, songwriter, and producer
- Alan Dick (1930–2002), British sprinter
- Albert Dick (1856–1934), American businessman
- Alfred Dick (entrepreneur) (1865–1909), Swiss sports executive and entrepreneur
- Alfred Dick (politician) (1927–2005), German politician and school teacher
- Allan Dick (politician) (1915–1992), New Zealand politician
- Allan Dick (field hockey) (born 1983) Scottish field hockey goalkeeper
- Allie Luse Dick (1859–1933), American music teacher
- Amnon Dick, (born 1952) Israeli businessman
- Andrew Dick (footballer) (born 1986), English-born Scottish footballer
- Andy Dick (born 1965), American comedian, actor, voice artist, musician and TV/film producer
- Auguste Dick (1910–1993), Austrian historian of mathematics
- Barry Dick, Australian sports columnist
- Billy Dick (1889–?), Australian rules footballer
- Brad Dick (born 1988), Australian rules footballer
- Cameron Dick, Australian politician
- Casey Dick (born 1986), American college footballer
- Charles W. F. Dick (1858–1945), American politician
- Christian Dick (1883–1955), Norwegian sailor
- Cressida Dick (born 1960), Commissioner of London Metropolitan Police
- Fish (singer) (born Derek William Dick 1958), Scottish singer
- Elisha C. Dick, mayor of Alexandria, Virginia, and attending physician at George Washington's death
- Florian Dick (born 1984), German footballer
- Franklin Archibald Dick (1823–1885), American jurist
- George Dick (Governor of Bombay) (?–1818), governor of Bombay
- George Dick (1921–1960), Scottish footballer
- Gerry Dick, American journalist
- Gradey Dick, American basketball player
- Harold G. Dick (1907–1997), American mechanical engineer
- Harry Dick (1920–2002), Canadian ice hockey player
- Heather M. Dick (1932-2007), Scottish microbiologist
- Homer E. A. Dick (1884–1942), New York state senator
- Ingrid Dick (born 1972), Australian netball player
- Irene Dick (born 1949), Curaçaoan politician
- James Dick (disambiguation)
- Jennifer K Dick (born 1970), American poet, translator and educator
- Jessie Alexandra Dick (1896–1976), Scottish artist
- Johann Dick (1927–1986), citizen of West Germany who was shot dead on the Czechoslovak border
- John Dick (basketball) (1918–2011), American basketball player
- John Dick (footballer born 1876) (1876–?), Scottish footballer
- John Dick (footballer born 1930) (1930–2000), Scottish footballer
- John Dick (scientist) (born 1957), Canadian scientist
- John Dick (US Congressman) (1794–1872), American politician
- Sir John Dick-Lauder (1883–1958), British soldier
- Jürgen Dick (born 1963), Swiss curler
- Kirby Dick (born 1952), American documentary film director
- King Size Dick (born 1942), German comedic musician

=== L–Z ===
- Larry Dick (1955–2019), American player of Canadian football
- Lily Dick (born 1999), Australian women's national rugby sevens team player
- Michael Clarke (musician), birth name of American drummer Michael Clarke
- Milton Dick (born 1972), Australian politician
- Myvanwy M. Dick (1910–1993), British-American zoologist and curator
- Nancy Dick (born 1930), Colorado's first female Lieutenant Governor
- Nigel Dick (born 1953), English director, writer and musician
- Paul Dick (1940–2018), Canadian lawyer and politician
- Paul Revere (musician) (1938–2014), American musician
- Philip K. Dick (1928–1982), American author whose published work was almost entirely in the science fiction genre
- Robert Dick (cricketer) (1889–1983), English cricketer
- Robert Dick (geologist) (1811–1866), Scottish geologist and botanist
- Robert Dick (flautist) (born 1950), American flutist and composer
- Sir Robert Henry Dick (c. 1785–1846), Scottish soldier
- Robert Dick Wilson (1856–1930), American linguist and Presbyterian scholar
- Robert P. Dick (1823–1898) American jurist
- Ross M. Dick (1912–1994) American journalist
- Samuel Dick, (1740–1812), American physician and politician
- Samuel Bernard Dick (1836–1907), American politician
- Sheldon Dick (1906–1950), American publisher, literary agent, photographer and filmmaker
- Stephen Dick (born 1985), Scottish field hockey player
- Thomas Dick (1774–1857), Scottish church minister, science teacher and writer
- Thomas Dick (1823–1900), New Zealand politician
- Timothy Alan Dick (born 1953), American comedian
- Urs Dick (born 1960), Swiss curler
- Vivienne Dick (born 1950), Irish filmmaker
- Walter Dick (1905–1989), Scottish-American footballer
- Wilhelm Dick (1897–1980), German-Czech ski jumper
- William Dick (Australian politician) (1865–1932), Australian politician
- William Reid Dick (1879–1961), Scottish sculptor
