= Dick =

Dick, Dicks, or Dick's may refer to:

== Media ==
- Dicks (album), 2004, by Fila Brazillia
- Dicks (band), a musical group
- Dick (film), a 1999 American comedy film
- "Dick" (song), 2019, by Starboi3 featuring Doja Cat
- Dicks: The Musical, a 2023 American black comedy film

== Names ==
- Dick (nickname), an index of people nicknamed Dick
- Dick (surname)
- Dicks (surname)
- Dick, a diminutive for Richard
- Edmond de la Fontaine (1823–1891), Luxembourgish poet who used the pen name "Dicks"
- James Dickson (botanist) (1738–1822) (botanical author abbreviation "Dicks.")

== Places ==
- Dicks Butte, a mountain in California
- Dick, Michigan, an unincorporated community

== Other uses ==
- Dick (slang), a dysphemism for the penis as well as a pejorative epithet
- Dick's Drive-In, a Seattle, Washington-based fast food chain
- Dick's Last Resort, An American themed restaurant chain based in Dallas, Texas
- Dick's Sporting Goods, a major sporting goods retailer in the US
- Dick's Sporting Goods Park, a soccer stadium in Commerce City, Colorado
- Detective, in early 20th century or 19th century English
- Democratic Indira Congress (Karunakaran), or DIC(K), a political party

== See also ==
- List of people with surname Dick
- Dickies
- Dicky (disambiguation)
- Dix (disambiguation)
- Dicker (disambiguation)
- Dyck
- I Love Dick, a novel by American artist and author Chris Kraus
- King Size Dick (born 1942), German rock music singer
- Moby Dick (disambiguation)
- Spotted dick, a British pudding
- Slippery dick
