= Dicks (surname) =

Dicks is a surname of the English West Midlands, Scotland, and Wales. It ranks 6,404 in frequency in the United States, out of 88,799.

Notable people with the surname include:

- Alan Dicks (born 1934), English footballer and manager
- Arthur Frederick Dicks (1935–1994), Australian actor and theater designer
- Chip Dicks (born 1951), American politician
- David Dicks (born 1978), Australian sailor
- Henry Dicks (1900–1977), British psychiatrist
- Janet Dicks (born 1933), American athlete
- Jeanie Dicks (1893–1980), British electrical engineer, electrified Winchester Cathedral
- John Dicks (actor) (born 1947), English actor
- John Dicks (publisher) (1818–1881), English publisher
- John Dicks (rugby union) (1912–1981), England international rugby union player
- Julian Dicks (born 1968), English footballer and manager
- Lynn Dicks, British conservation scientist and ecologist
- Matthew Dicks (born 1971), American writer
- Norm Dicks (born 1940), American politician
- Paul Dicks (born 1950), Canadian politician
- Philip Dicks (born 1962), English cricketer
- Ronnie Dicks (1924–2004), English footballer
- Ted Dicks (1928–2012), English composer
- Terrance Dicks (1935–2019), English author and screenwriter
- Terry Dicks (1937–2020), British politician
- William Dicks (1930–2023), Australian rules footballer

== See also ==
- Dicks (disambiguation)
- Dick (surname)
- Dix (disambiguation)
