= General Dick =

General Dick may refer to:

- Charles W. F. Dick (1858–1945), Ohio National Guard major general
- Franklin Archibald Dick (1823–1885), Missouri provost marshal general
- Robert Henry Dick (1787–1846), British Army major general

== See also ==
- James Dick-Cunyngham (1877–1935), British Army major general
