= Ron McAuliffe =

Australian politician

Ron McAuliffe OBE
- McAuliffe in 1974

Senator for Queensland
- In office 1 July 1971 – 30 June 1981

Personal details
- Born: 25 June 1918 Brisbane, Queensland, Australia
- Died: 16 August 1988 (aged 70) Spring Hill, Queensland, Australia
- Party: Australian Labor Party

Ronald Edward McAuliffe OBE (25 June 1918 – 16 August 1988) was an Australian politician and sports administrator in Queensland. He is best remembered for his years running the Queensland Rugby League, and his instrumental role in the formation of the State of Origin series.

== Early life ==
McAuliffe attended school at St. Joseph's College, Gregory Terrace in Brisbane. In 1932 he played rugby league for the Gregory Terrace firsts. He started playing senior rugby league in 1937 for the Northern Suburbs club, but with the outbreak of World War II he joined the Australian Imperial Force. He served as a Warrant Officer for five years, before being honourably discharged after service in the Middle East and New Guinea with the 2/2 Casualty Clearing Station.

After the war McAuliffe worked with the Queensland Railways Audit Office. Whilst living at New Farm he formed social bonds with a number of Valleys players. In the late 1940s he moved to Fortitude Valley's Brunswick Street, sharing a flat Roy Westaway, a former international representative playing for the Diehards. According to Australian rugby league hall of fame inductee Duncan Hall, who was also playing for Valleys:

(Ron) was one of those blokes who was always around the place... he knew everyone worth knowing, and everyone knew him. He drank at the Valley pub with us every night after work. In fact, he was one of those blokes who was the life of the party and who never seemed to want to go home. He was always around.

== Rugby league ==
McAuliffe was elected to the Valley's committee and became the club's delegate to the Brisbane Rugby League in 1951. In 1952 he was elected chairman of the Brisbane Rugby League.

In 1953, the Brisbane Rugby League was subsumed into the Queensland Rugby League (QRL). Ron McAuliffe became secretary to the organisation and began negotiations with the Brisbane City Council to lease Lang Park. In 1971 he became president of the QRL. Although initially opposed to the idea, McAuliffe became a driving force behind the establishment of the State of Origin series. The 1980s were to prove a golden period for rugby league in Queensland.

== Politics ==
On 30 June, 1971, McAuliffe was elected as a Senator for the Australian Labor Party in the Parliament of Australia.

McAuliffe sat in the Senate until 30 June 1981. At the end of 1981 he was appointed Officer of the Order of the British Empire.

== Personal life and honours ==
McAuliffe died in August 1988 from a stroke. His funeral was held on 17 August, 1988, at St. Patrick's Roman Catholic Church in Fortitude Valley and he was buried in Nudgee Cemetery. His pall bearers included then Australian and Queensland captain Wally Lewis. In his obituary The Courier-Mail journalist Barry Dick wrote that "he [Ron McAuliffe] loved a drink, loved an argument, and most of all, he loved company."

The Ron McAuliffe Medal is awarded to each year's State of Origin Queensland player of the series. Lang Park's Ron McAuliffe stand was also named in his honour.

In 2009, McAuliffe was inducted into the Queensland Sport Hall of Fame.

== Sources ==
- Gallaway, Jack Origin: Rugby League's Greatest Contest 1980-2002 University of Queensland Press, 2003 ISBN 0-7022-3383-8
