= James Dick =

James Dick may refer to:

- James Dick (slave trader) (1743–1828), Scottish slave trader and philanthropist
- Sir James Dick of Prestonfield (c. 1644–1728), Scottish merchant and lord provost of Edinburgh
- James Dick (born 1973), American professional wrestler, whose ring name was Tank Toland
- Jimmy Dick (racing driver), American racing driver and businessman
- Jamie Dick, his son, American stock car racing driver
- Jimmy Dick (rugby union), Irish international rugby union player
- Jim Dick, American football player

== See also ==
- Dick James (disambiguation)
