= Robert Dick =

Robert Dick may refer to:

- Robert Dick (geologist) (1811–1866), Scottish geologist and botanist
- Robert Dick (salt-grieve), 17th century merchant and inspector of salt works, imprisoned on the Bass Rock
- Robert Dick (flutist) (born 1950), American flutist and composer
- Robert P. Dick (1823–1898), American jurist
- Robert Dick (cricketer) (1889–1983), English cricketer
- Robert Henry Dick (1785–1846), Scottish soldier
- Robert Burns Dick (1868–1954), British architect, city planner and artist

== See also ==
- Robert H. Dicke (1916–1997), American physicist
- Robert Dicks, covenanter
