= D*** =

D*** may refer to:

- Damn, as a profanity
- Dick (slang)
