= Dick joke =

Joke referring to the human penis

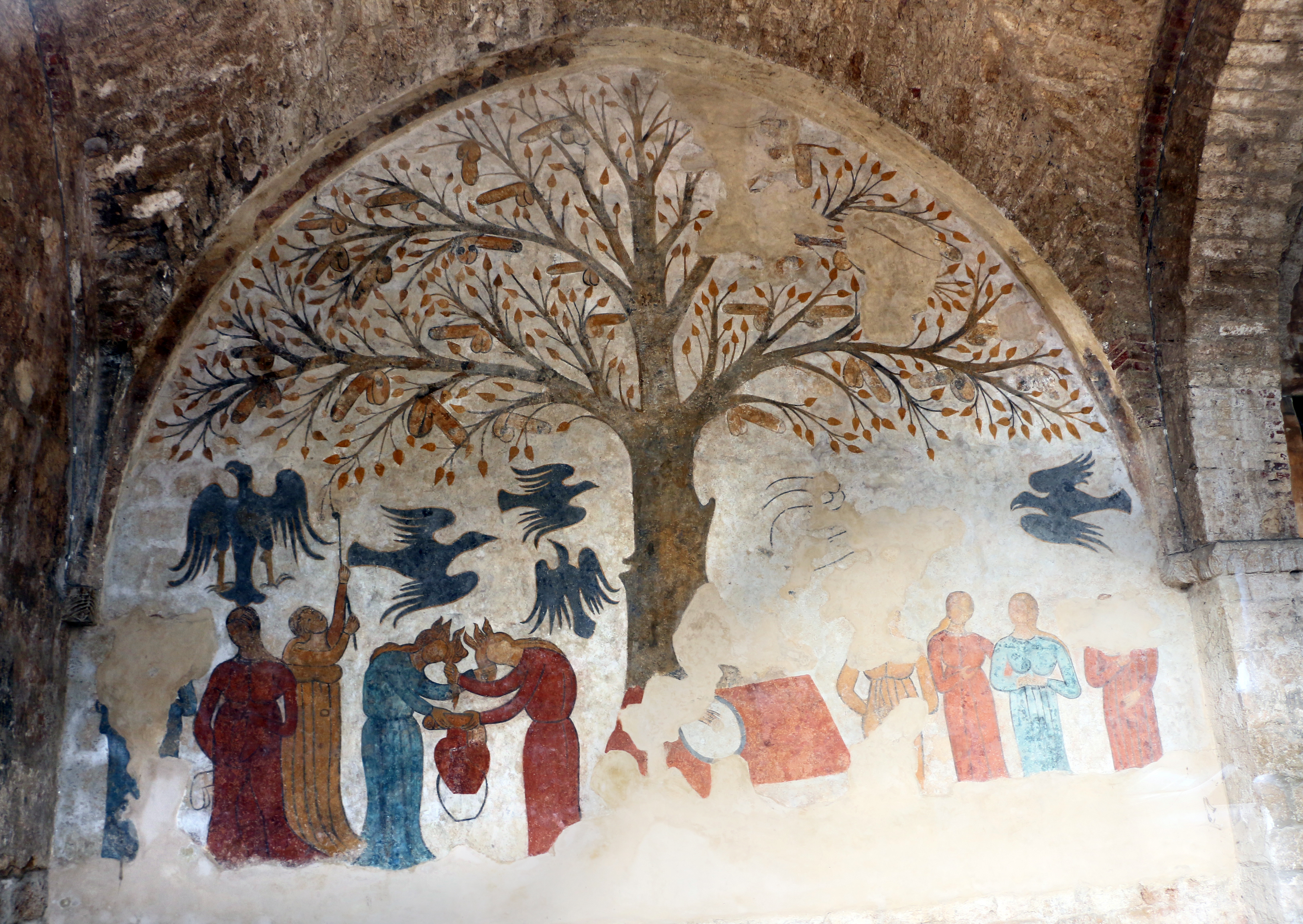
This mural in Massa Marittima is a phallus tree – a popular motif in medieval art which contains an element of bawdy humour.

In comedy, a dick joke, dork joke, penis joke, cock joke or knob joke is a joke that makes a direct or indirect reference to a human penis (known in slang parlance as a dick), also used as an umbrella term for dirty jokes. The famous quote from Mae West, "Is that a gun in your pocket or are you just excited to see me?" (alluding to an erection) is cited as an example of a penis joke. The "dick joke" has been described as "often used as a metaphor for the male-defined nature of stand-up comedy". Dick jokes have also been noted to be both popular and effective with audiences:

Comics use what "works", and dick jokes are guaranteed to amuse audiences of both genders in a surprising variety of contexts. Simply put, dick jokes get the quickest and biggest laughs, and in stand-up comedy, size does matter.

== In comedy ==
An important component of a dick joke is breaking a social taboo. As Canadian comedian Ricky Blue puts it, "The trick is being able to speak the unspeakable and somehow get away with it."

Comedian Bill Hicks satirized the popularity of dick jokes in his own act:

'He hasn't told any dick jokes. Doesn't he know he's in America? Doesn't he know about our puritanical self hatred of our own body and its desires? The only way we can find relief is through the medium of penis material!' Yeah, I'm totally aware of where I am, don't worry. The dick jokes are on their way.

However, due to their prurient nature, comedians who rely on explicit humor must find less controversial subject matter if they wish to expand their presence to more restrictive venues like network television and family films. In short, "young professionals whose success has been achieved on the stepladder of dick jokes must eventually change their acts".

An example of a joke of this type relying on an unspoken connotation is:

[A] particularly beautiful student was stunned when the biology professor asked her, "What part of the human anatomy enlarges to about ten times its normal measurement during periods of emotion or excitement?" "I . . . I refuse to answer that question", the girl stammered as she shyly avoided looking at her male classmates sitting nearby. One of them was called upon next, and he correctly answered, "The pupil of the eye". "Miss Rogers," said the professor, "your refusal to answer my question makes three things evident. First, you didn't study last night's assignment. Second, you have a dirty mind. And third," concluded the professor, "I'm afraid marriage is going to be a tremendous disappointment for you."

Because the name Richard can be abbreviated as "Dick", in some jokes a person named "Richard" or "Dick" is presented as a double entendre.

== See also ==
- Sex comedy
