= Simon Somerville Laurie =

Scottish educator (1829–1909)

- Simon Sommerville Laurie by George Fiddes Watt
- Born: 13 November 1829; Edinburgh
- Died: 2 March 1909 (aged 79); Edinburgh
- Other name: Tae
- Occupation: educator
- Spouse(s): Catherine Ann Hibburd, Lucy Struthers

Simon Somerville Laurie FRSE LLD (13 November 1829 – 2 March 1909) was a Scottish educator. He became Bell Professor of Education at Edinburgh University in 1876. He campaigned energetically and successfully for better teacher training in Scotland.

Laurie also wrote extensively on philosophy, giving the Gifford Lectures in 1905–6.

== Biography ==
=== Early life ===
Laurie was born on 13 November 1829 in Edinburgh, the eldest son of Rev James Laurie or Lawrie and his wife Jean Somerville. His father was a Presbyterian minister and chaplain to the Royal Infirmary of Edinburgh. His mother was the daughter of a United Presbyterian church minister at Elgin, Simon Somerville. They lived near the Edinburgh Royal Infirmary at 112 Lauriston Place.

Laurie was educated at Edinburgh High School from 1839 to 1844. To help pay his own school fees, he was already teaching at age 11. He studied arts at the University of Edinburgh, where he graduated MA at the then normal age of 19 in 1849. He then travelled for 5 years in England, Ireland and Europe, with private students.

=== Career ===
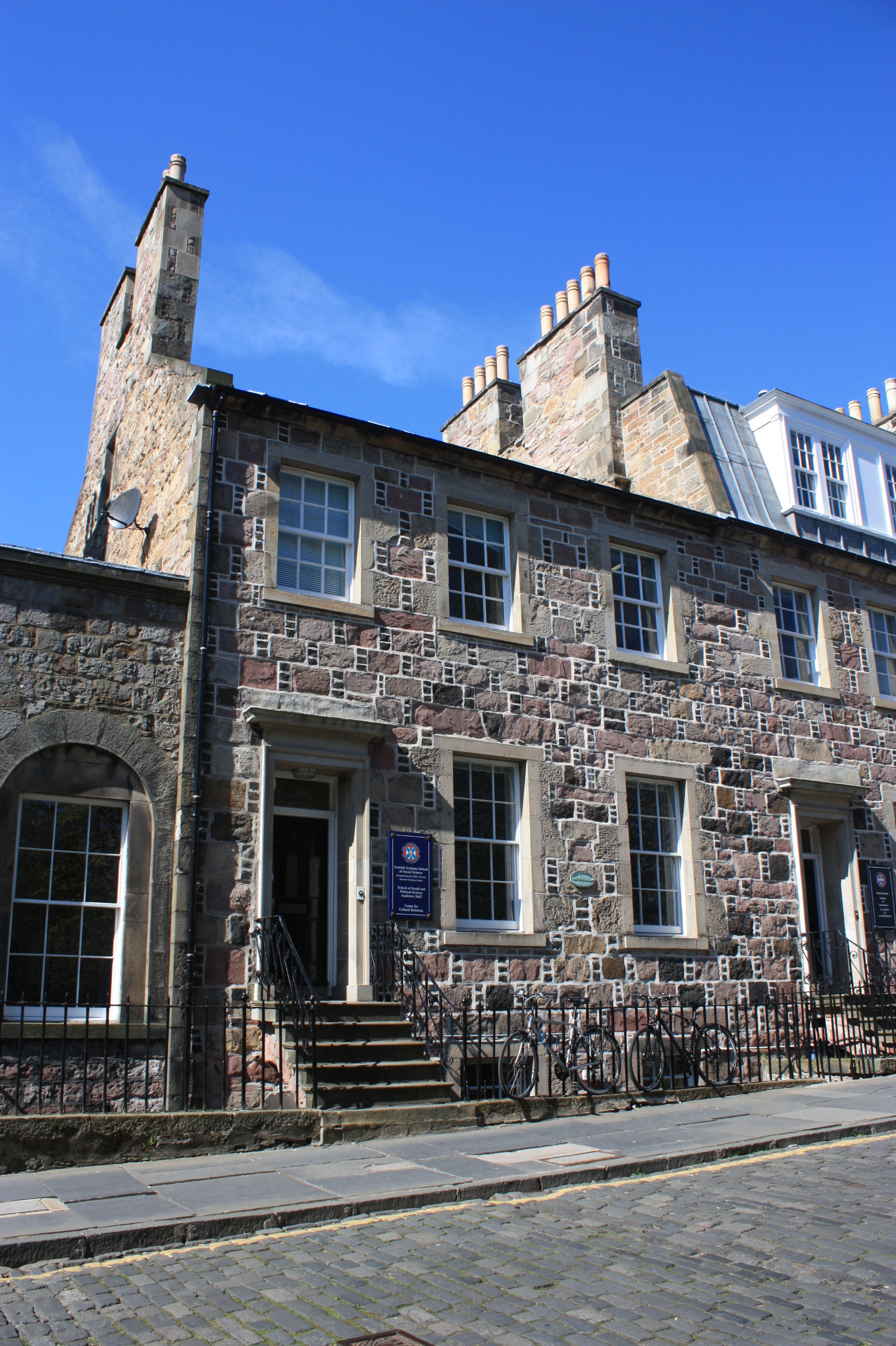
Laurie's house at 22 George Square, Edinburgh

In 1855, he became secretary and visitor of schools for the Church of Scotland's education committee, which was then responsible for Scottish parish schools and for teacher training. Laurie held this role for 50 years, during which time he greatly improved the education of teachers in Scotland. He vigorously campaigned to have all teachers educated at a university, with the teacher training colleges providing professional training only after that. It took until 1873 for the Scottish Board of Education to give the training colleges the right to send their best students, at least, to universities to gain full degrees. Laurie went further, campaigning to have day training colleges set up in England, and in 1890 he succeeded in this also, personally inaugurating the teacher training department of University College, Liverpool.

In 1856, he became visitor and examiner for the Dick Bequest Trust. The trust distributed money to the best school teachers in northeast Scotland (Aberdeen, Banff, and Moray counties) according to Laurie's published reports.

In 1868, the Merchant Company of Edinburgh and the Heriot Trust both invited Laurie to inspect their Edinburgh schools. The Merchant Company's schools were known as "hospitals" and were run in monastic style. His report was critical of these schools, observing that while a larger amount was spent on them than all the parish schools of Scotland, they were not providing adequate moral and intellectual education. Laurie recommended sending the boys to his alma mater, the Edinburgh High School, while a new high school should be opened for day girls. His recommendations were embodied in an 1869 Act of Parliament which abolished the monastic and alms-giving nature of the former "hospitals".

In 1872, Laurie was appointed secretary to the Royal Commission on Scottish endowed schools. His reports for the commission led to the reorganisation of secondary schooling under Lord Moncrieff (1878) and Lord Balfour of Burleigh (1882–1889).

In 1876, Laurie became the first Bell Professor of Education at the University of Edinburgh. In his first year there, he had 12 students; the number rose to 120 by the end of his tenure in 1903. He used the position to improve pedagogy in the whole of Britain, not only in Scotland.

Also in 1876, he became honorary secretary of the Association for Promoting Secondary Education in Scotland, a voluntary campaigning organisation. It was dissolved in 1880 when it achieved its goal with the passing of the Endowed Institutions (Scotland) Act 1878.

In 1891, as president of the Teachers' Guild of Great Britain and Ireland, Laurie gave evidence before a select parliamentary committee, arguing for the registration and organisation of all state school teachers to improve the quality of teaching. At the same time, he was strongly opposed to centralised bureaucratic control by the board of education, favouring freedom for local education authorities.

=== Writings ===
He wrote widely on education and on philosophical topics. Josipa Petrunic describes his philosophical writings as "often nebulous and obscure", in contrast to his more practical work on education.

Laurie resigned his chair in 1903 and retired from his work with the Dick Bequest in 1907. In 1905–6, he gave the Gifford Lectures in natural theology in Edinburgh. He wrote up the lectures in Synthetica (1905–06), which "gave Laurie high rank among speculative writers". The French philosopher Georges Remacle translated and commented on Synthetica.

=== Awards and honours ===
On his retirement, Laurie's admirers presented him with the portrait oil painting by George Fiddes Watt (see illustration). The painting is now in the University of Edinburgh Fine Art Collection.

Laurie was given honorary LL.D. degrees by the University of St Andrews in 1887, the University of Edinburgh in 1903, and the University of Aberdeen in 1906. He was a Fellow of the Royal Society of Edinburgh.

== Family ==
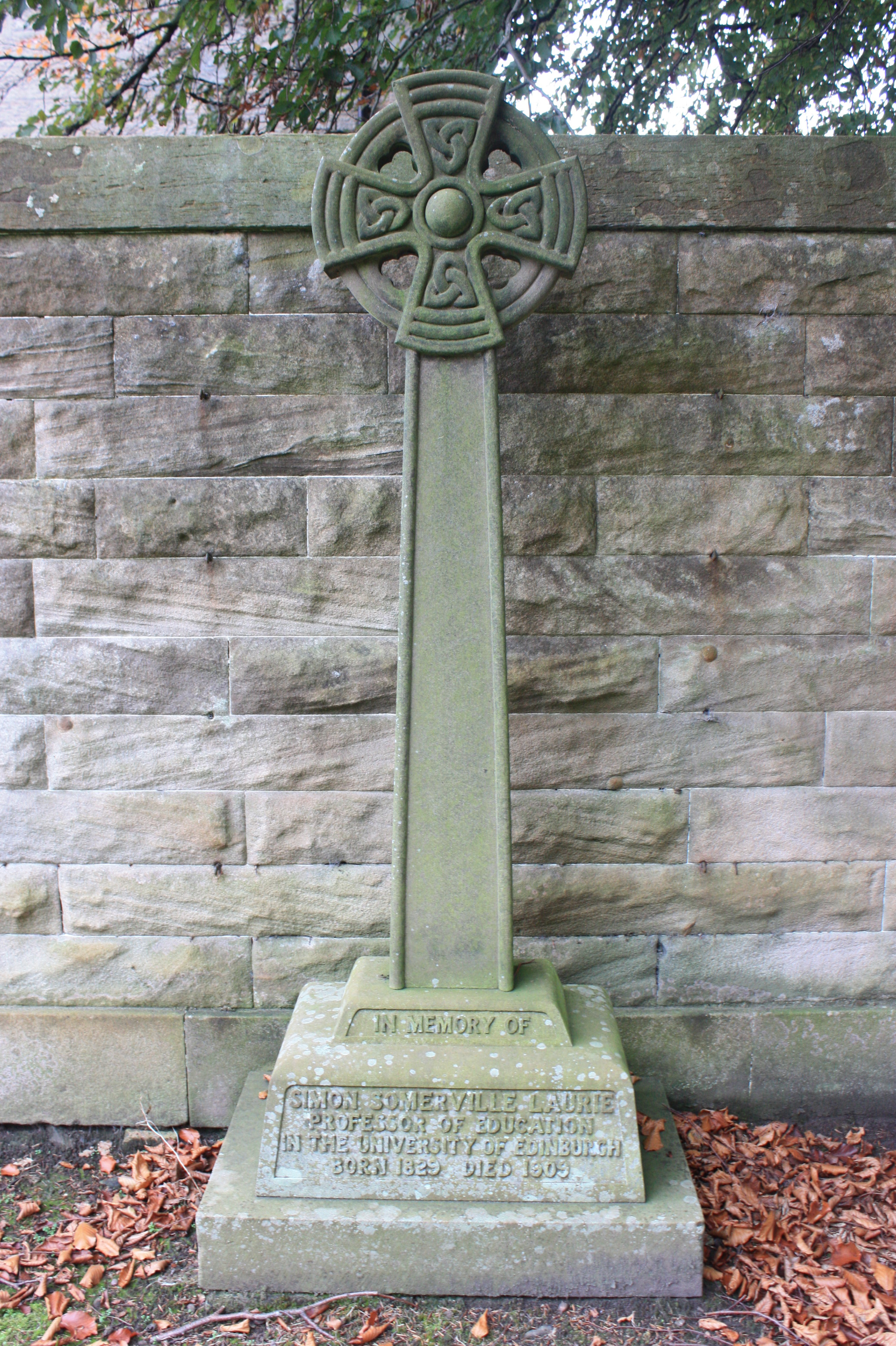
The grave of Simon Somerville Laurie, Grange Cemetery, Edinburgh

Laurie married Catherine Ann Hibburd (1827–1895) in 1860. They had 4 children together; Katherine "Kitty" Ann Laurie (1863–1928), Margaret "Madge" Jean Somerville Laurie (1870–1955), the chemist Arthur Pillans Laurie (1861–1949), and the zoologist Malcolm Laurie (1866–1932). Arthur and Malcolm were both elected Fellows of the Royal Society of Edinburgh.

His sister, Mary Struthers Laurie, married Sir David Orme Masson.

Catherine died in 1895. Laurie then married Lucy "Osy" Struthers (1871–1963), the daughter of Sir John Struthers, in 1901.

He died on 2 March 1909 at his house 22 George Square, Edinburgh. He is buried in the Grange Cemetery in Edinburgh. The grave lies in the western extension against the southern wall, close to the south-west corner.

== Works ==
- On the Fundamental Doctrine of Latin Syntax (1859)
- On the Philosophy of Ethics: An Analytical Essay. Edmonston and Douglas, Edinburgh. (1866)
- On Primary Instruction in Relation to Education (1867)
- Notes Expository and Critical on Certain British Theories of Morals (1868)
- Chair of Education, University of Edinburgh: Inaugural Address (1876)
- John Amos Comenius (1881; sixth edition, 1898)
- On the Educational Wants of Scotland (1881)
- Free education, etc., etc.: Chair of Institutes and History of Education: Introductory Lecture (1884)
- Metaphysica nova et vetusta: A Return to Dualism (under the pseudonym "Scotus Novanticus", 1884)
- Ethica, or, The Ethics of Reason (under the pseudonym Scotus Novanticus, 1885)
- The Rise and Early Constitution of Universities, with a Survey of Mediaeval Education (1887)
- Occasional Addresses on Educational Subjects (1888)
- Lectures on Language and Linguistic Method in the School, Delivered in the University of Cambridge, Easter Term, 1889 (1890)
- Institutes of Education: Compromising an Introduction to Rational Psychology (1892)
- Historical Survey of Pre-Christian Education (1895)
- John Amos Comenius, Bishop of the Moravians: His Life and Educational Works (1899)
- Synthetica: Being Meditations Epistemological and Ontological, Gifford Lectures. 2 Volumes (1. On Knowledge; 2. On God and Man). Longmans, Green and Co. (1905–1906)

== Bibliography ==
- Knox, H.M. (May 1962). "Simon Somerville Laurie: 1829–1909". British Journal of Educational Studies. 10 (2): 138–152. doi:10.1080/00071005.1962.9973075. JSTOR 3118774.
- Petrunic, Josipa. "Authors: Simon Somerville Laurie". Gifford Lectures, Templeton Press. Archived from the original on 17 October 2012.
- Templeton, Ian Godfrey (24 November 2010). "Simon Somerville Laurie: his educational thought and contribution to Scottish education. 1855 – 1909". Edinburgh Research Archive. hdl:1842/5853.
- Watson, Foster (1912). "Laurie, Simon Somerville" . In Lee, Sidney (ed.). Dictionary of National Biography (2nd supplement). London: Smith, Elder & Co.
