= Cock (slang) =

English slang term for the human penis

Cock is a common English slang word for the human penis. It is asserted to have been in use as early as 1450. The term has given rise to a wide range of derived terms, such as cockblock, cocksucker, and cocktease, and is also often invoked in double entendres involving words and phrases that contain the phoneme but without originating from the slang term, such as cockfighting, cockpit, cocktail, and cock a doodle doo.

== Etymology ==
The word can be traced through the Middle English cok, from Old English coc, cocc 'cock, male bird', from Proto-West Germanic *kokk, from Proto-Germanic *kukkaz, probably of onomatopoeic origin. It is cognate with Middle Dutch cocke (also meaning 'cock, male bird') and Old Norse kokkr. This is reinforced by the Old French coc, also of imitative origin. Use of the compound term pillicock to refer to the penis is attested since 1325.

Because "cock" is susceptible to numerous centuries-old meanings, it is "difficult to pinpoint the first clear use of the phallic sense", though the slang usage is generally understood to be related to the sense of a "male farmyard fowl". Other senses that appear to derive from the same origin include that of a valve or tap for controlling water flow in plumbing, and the hammer of a firearm trigger mechanism, both of which allow for semantic similarities to acts involving the penis. Two instances of the use of "cock" in the works of William Shakespeare are thought to be double entendres for the phallic sense, one being in the 1594 play The Taming of the Shrew, where Petruchio describes his crest as "a combless cock", and another in the 1599 play, Henry VI, Part 2, where a character named "Pistol" declares, "Pistol's cock is up".

== Derived terms ==
"Cock" has given rise to a wide array of derived terms, such as "cockhound" for a promiscuous male, "cocksucker" for a person who performs fellatio on a man (or "cocksucking" for the act itself), and "cocktease" for a person who sexually arouses a man without providing sexual release.

=== Cockblock ===
Cockblock (also cock-block or cock block) is a US slang term for an action, whether intentional or not, that prevents someone else from having sex. Such behavior is said to be motivated by jealousy or competitiveness, although it is sometimes accidental or inadvertent. The term is also used (or the term "cockblocker") for a person who engages in such obstruction or intervention.

Social research has documented norms among male peer groups that view "cockblock" behavior as negative, which may make men less likely to challenge each other's behavior or impede sexual access to women, sometimes even in cases of possible sexual assault or intimate partner violence. The term appears to date at least to 1972, when Edith Folb documented its use by urban Black teenagers in the United States.

Marla Gibbs uses the phrase in the 1999 film Lost & Found. The 2007 film Superbad also references cockblocking, with one character counseling against it.

=== Cocksucker ===
Cocksucker, and cocksucking as both an adjective and a noun, refer to the act of fellatio, and historically have particularly been used in connection with the performance of this act as a homosexual act. The New Partridge Dictionary of Slang and Unconventional English traces both the descriptive usage of "cocksucker" and the adjectival form of "cocksucking" to 1865 in the United States. It further traces the use of "cocksucker" as a "generalised term of abuse" to 1918 in the United States, and cites to uses of both terms in print in the 1950s by writers including Jack Kerouac, Allen Ginsberg, and William S. Burroughs.

"Cocksucker" was one of the seven dirty words that American comedian George Carlin first listed in his famous 1972 "Seven Words You Can Never Say on Television" monologue. Carlin noted in the monologue that "cock" alone was ambiguous and also had inoffensive meanings, while "cocksucker" did not. At the time that Carlin originated the act, "cocksucker" was used almost exclusively as an insult towards men implying that they performed homosexual acts. Carlin also noted in his comedy routine that the term was not used with respect to the practice of fellatio by females, stating: "For some reason, now cocksucker means bad man. It's a good woman". Another comedian, Lenny Bruce, was arrested for using the word in his act in the 1960s.

== See also ==
- Blockers (film)
- Dick (slang)
- Friend zone
- Intrasexual competition
- Prick (slang)
- The Dog in the Manger
- Third wheel
