= Malcolm Laurie =

Scottish zoologist and palaeontologist

- Born: 27 February 1866; Edinburgh
- Died: 16 July 1932 (aged 70); Harpenden
- Education: King's College, Cambridge
- Known for: Arachnids, Scorpions
- Scientific career
- Fields: Zoology, Palaeontology

Malcolm Laurie FRSE FLS (27 February 1866 – 16 July 1932) was a Scottish zoologist and palaeontologist.

== Biography ==
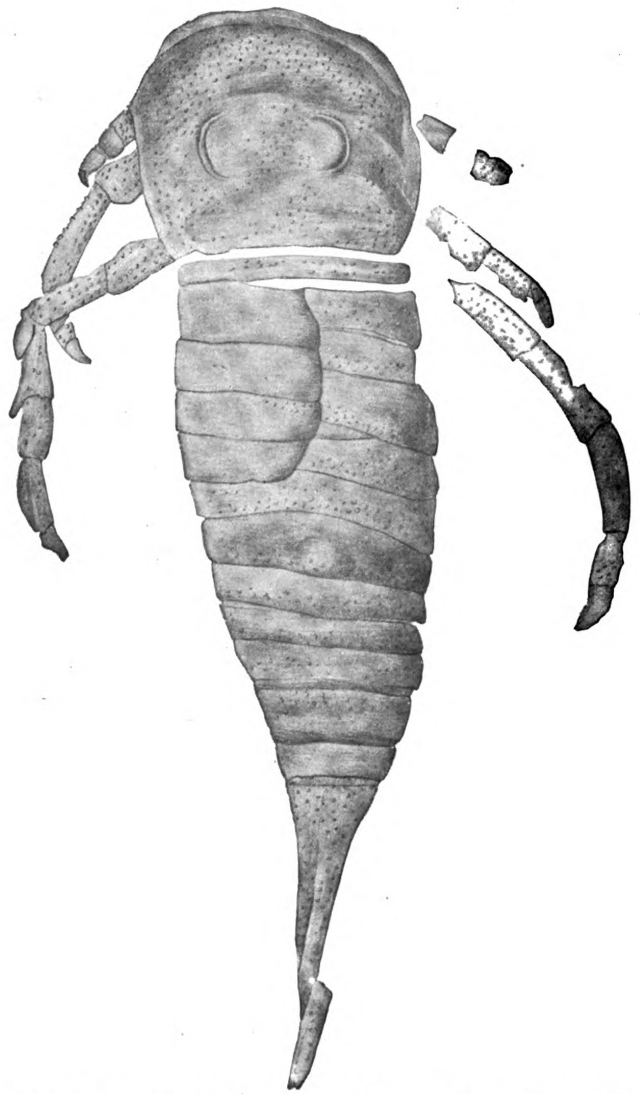
A figure from The Eurypterida of New York, drawn by Malcolm Laurie

He was born in Brunstane House south of Portobello, Edinburgh on 27 February 1866, the son of Catherine Ann Hibburd and her husband Simon Somerville Laurie. He was educated at Edinburgh Academy from 1876 to 1880. He studied science, first at the University of Edinburgh, then at the University of Cambridge, where he graduated with a BA in 1889. He returned to Edinburgh for postgraduate studies and gained his doctorate (DSc) in 1894.

On gaining his doctorate, he received an immediate post as Professor of Zoology at St Mungo's College, Glasgow. In 1918, he returned to Edinburgh to lecture in Zoology at both the Royal College of Physicians of Edinburgh and the Royal College of Surgeons of Edinburgh.

In 1894, he had been elected a Fellow of the Royal Society of Edinburgh. His proposers were James Cossar Ewart, James Geikie, Sir William Turner and Ramsay Heatley Traquair. He was also a Fellow of the Linnean Society.

He became examiner in zoology at the University of Glasgow in 1899.

In 1907, he was living at "The Bloom", a villa on Canaan Lane in south-west Edinburgh.

== Family ==
His father was the educator Simon Somerville Laurie. He was the younger brother of chemist Arthur Pillans Laurie (1861-1949), both of whom were also Fellows of the Royal Society of Edinburgh.

== Reception ==
In a letter to Nature, three scientists wrote: "The systematic position of Limulus has long been a vexed question, which no one can attempt to solve without consulting the work of Malcolm Laurie on the fossil Eurypterids."

== Works ==
Laurie published numerous papers on the arachnids, especially the scorpions. For instance:

- Laurie, Malcolm (1891). "Some points in the development of Scorpio fulvipes". Quarterly Journal of Microscopical Science. 1891 (October). OCLC 903913103. (reprint)

He also published:

- Scott Elliot, George Francis; Laurie, Malcolm; Murdoch, James Barclay, eds. (1901). Fauna, Flora and Geology of the Clyde Area. Glasgow: Published by the Local Committee for the Meeting of the British Association. OCLC 8832984 (all editions).
