= Massa Marittima mural =

- Tree of Fertility
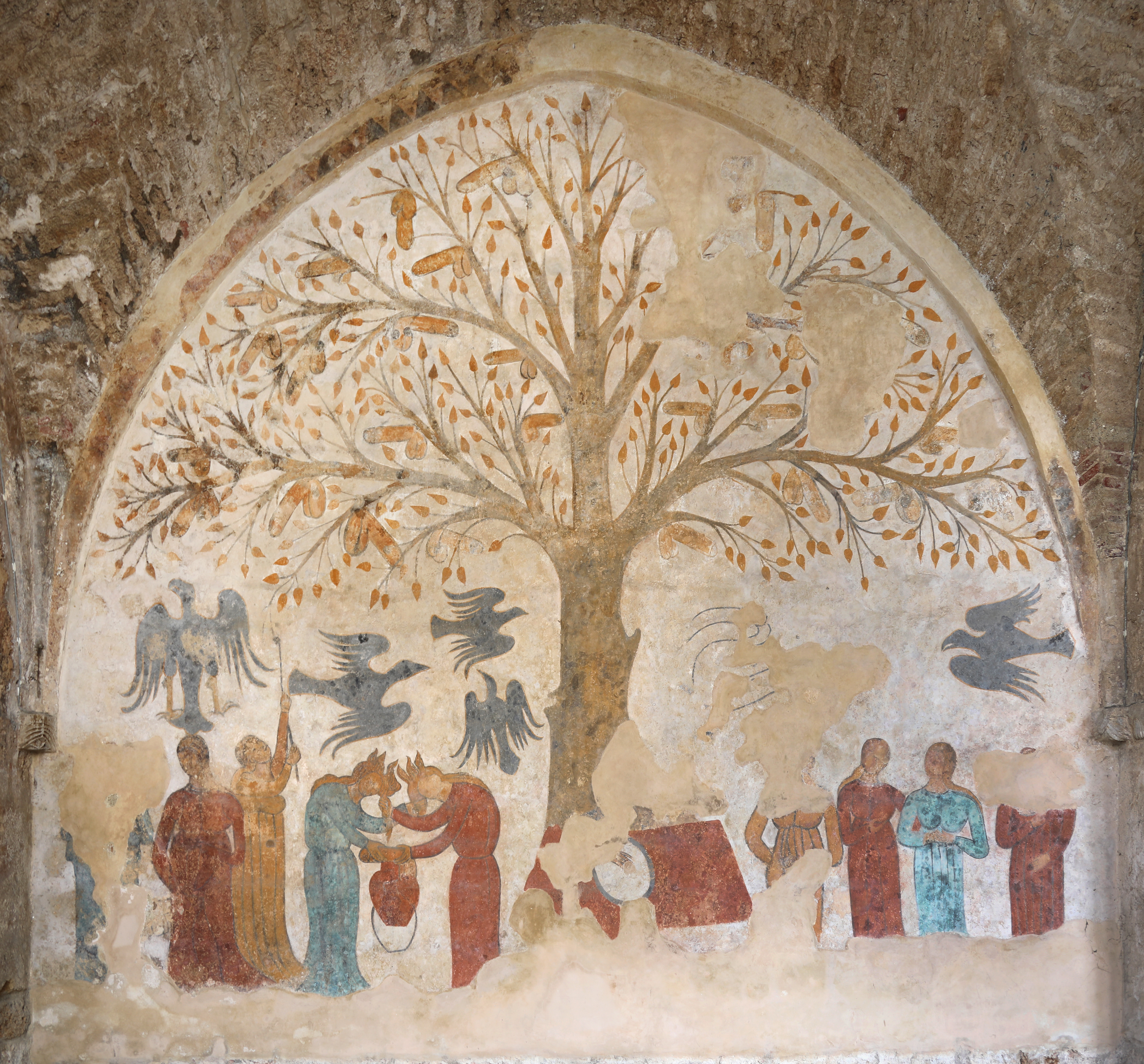
- Artist: Unknown
- Year: Second half of the 13th century
- Medium: fresco
- Subject: Phallus tree
- Location: Massa Marittima

The Massa Marittima mural is a 13th-century fresco located on the rear wall of the Fonte dell’Abbondanza, a public fountain in the Tuscan town of Massa Marittima. Often called the “Tree of Fertility,” the image features a large tree bearing numerous phalluses, surrounded by women and black birds. Positioned on a civic structure in a public space, the mural has attracted scholarly attention for its unusual subject matter and ambiguous meaning.

Scholars have offered many interpretations, including political satire, fertility imagery, moral messaging, and signs of factional conflict. Others have placed it within the broader traditions of public art in medieval Italian cities, connecting it to ideas about gender, civic identity, and social control.

Today, the mural is seen as an important example of how art in the Duecento (13th-century) combined politics, symbolism, and public display.
