= Arthur Pillans Laurie =

Scottish chemist

- Born: 6 November 1861; Edinburgh, Scotland
- Died: 7 October 1949 (aged 87); Scotland, United Kingdom
- Education: Cambridge University
- Known for: Infrared photography of paintings
- Scientific career
- Fields: Chemistry, Analysis of paintings
- Workplaces: Royal College of Arts

Prof Arthur Pillans Laurie FRSE LLD (6 November 1861 – 7 October 1949) was a Scottish chemist who pioneered the scientific analysis of paintings, especially by Rembrandt. He was also a Nazi sympathiser who opposed the Second World War.

== Early life ==
Laurie was born on 6 November 1861, the son of Simon Somerville Laurie and his wife, Catherine Ann Hibburd. The family lived at Brunstane House, a 17th-century country house, south of Portobello, in eastern Edinburgh. He was the brother of zoologist Malcolm Laurie (1866–1932), also a fellow of the RSE.

Laurie was educated at Edinburgh Academy from 1871 to 1878 and then studied science at the University of Edinburgh and King's College, Cambridge, where he took a first in the natural sciences tripos in 1884.

== Chemist ==
The pre-Raphaelite painter William Holman Hunt interested Laurie in the chemistry of paint and the scientific analysis of paintings. Laurie pioneered the use of chemical analysis to discover the composition of artworks to show their true age and origins. He was the first to use infrared photography to reveal deeper layers of paint. Through infrared work, he found the date of a Rembrandt self-portrait in which the date painted by the artist had later been covered up.

In 1885, Laurie was elected a Fellow of the Royal Society of Edinburgh. His proposers were Peter Guthrie Tait, Alexander Crum Brown, Edward Sang and George Chrystal.

In 1895, Laurie became a lecturer at St Mary's Hospital Medical School and joined the Royal Commission on Secondary Education. In 1898, the Royal College of Physicians made him an examiner in chemistry. In 1900, Laurie became the principal of Heriot-Watt College, Edinburgh. He held that position until 1928. In 1912, Laurie became the professor of chemistry at the Royal Academy of Arts.

During the First World War, Laurie did extensive, if perhaps controversial, work as Chairman of the Chemical Inventing Committee, part of the Munitions Inventions Department, and he also served on the Chemical Waste Products and Buildings Committee. In 1915, Laurie complained that his eclectic interests were hindering his career as he wrote about his inability to get himself elected to the Royal Society: "I believe the trouble is I am neither 'fish, flesh, nor good red herring'". At various times, Laurie published articles on British politics, electrochemistry, stone preservation, paint, educational reform, munitions, vegetarianism and what he called the "scientific examination of art", which for him was "a mixture of scientific experiments and literary criticism".

In particular, Laurie set himself up as an expert on authenticating paintings by Rembrandt, who had been largely ignored during his own lifetime, and his fame was posthumous. It was only in the early 20th century that it was decided that he had been a great painter after all. Because Rembrandt had been ignored in the 17th century, it was difficult to determine whether paintings were actually by him since it was always easy for a forger to add a signature resembling Rembrandt's to a 17th-century painting by another artist, or even to produce a complete forgery done in a style that resembled his style and to pass off the work as a previously unknown painting by him. Laurie believed that by taking magnified photographs of paintings, he could determine, via scientific methods of analysis of the style of the brushwork, whether or not the painting was by Rembrandt.

Laurie stood as a candidate for Parliament at the 1929 general election in the constituency of Edinburgh South for the Liberal Party, finishing second. In 1932, Laurie published the book The Brushwork of Rembrandt and his School.

== Fascism ==
Between 14 May and 15 June 1937, an Imperial conference attended by all the leaders of the Commonwealth was held in London to allow the Dominion Prime Ministers to attend the coronation of the new king George VI and to meet the new king. Laurie prepared a memo that he was able to have issued to the Dominion prime ministers on the account of his reputation as a world-famous chemist, stating his views about Eastern Europe and asking for the Dominions to apply pressure on the United Kingdom not to become involved in Eastern Europe. Laurie believed that there was a possibility that the new government of Neville Chamberlain might go to war with Germany on account of a conflict in Eastern Europe and wanted the Dominion prime ministers to dissuade him from that prospect.

Laurie began with the statement that airbases in Czechoslovakia exposed Germany to danger, arguing it was possible to bomb German cities from Czechoslovakia. Laurie argued the economic prosperity of Czechoslovakia rested on the Sudeten Germans and that: "Since the war, the Germans have been in a most unhappy situation. The glass factories are in ruin, the trade is gone, and what work is going is given to the Czechs". Laurie depicted living conditions in the Sudetenland as abysmal and claimed falsely that most Sudeten German children were suffering from hunger as he accused the Czechs of taking their wealth. Laurie wrote that he believed the main dangers to European peace were the French premier Léon Blum and the Soviet foreign commissar Maxim Litvinov. Laurie noted that both Blum and Litvinov were Jews, which led him to accuse both men of seeking war against the Reich. Laurie ended his memo by stating that "Bohemia" should belong to Germany and felt that the Dominions should not go to war for the sake of Czechoslovakia, writing: "It is for the Dominions to save Great Britain from this terrible blunder". Laurie was influenced by the memory of the Chanak Crisis of 1922 when the Dominions collectively put an end to plans for Britain to go to war against Turkey, and without Dominion support Britain was forced to backdown.

In 1937, Laurie joined The Link, a pro-Nazi group led by Admiral Barry Domvile, which, as its name suggests, was intended to be a link with the NSDAP. Laurie sat on the national council of The Link. Other members of The Link's national council were Lord Redesdale, Raymond Beazley, C.E. Carroll, and A.E.R. Dyer. On 12 October 1938, Laurie had published a letter to The Times advocating an Anglo-German alliance.

After Germany violated the Munich Agreement by seizing the Czech half of Czechoslovakia on 15 March 1939, which became the Protectorate of Bohemia-Moravia, there was a notable shift in British public opinion against Germany, with even many of the former "enthusiasts" for the Third Reich either changing their views or falling silent. Laurie was an exception amongst the "enthusiasts" in continuing to defend Nazi Germany and even the March action, which had so enraged the British people. On 8 May 1939, Laurie's work, The Case for Germany, was published in Berlin with a foreword by his close friend, Admiral Domvile. It is pro-Nazi anti-Semitic book and praises Hitler's Germany. The book begins by commending Hitler as a painter and then expounds on National Socialism. He continues with a defence of Nazism as he experienced it during his stay in Germany and criticises Marxist socialism. In The Case for Germany, Laurie professed to be taking the stance of an objective scientist who reached his conclusions based upon a strictly empirical approach. The Case for Germany was given extensive publicity in Germany, and remained in print even after the war began. At the beginning of The Case for Germany, Laurie wrote: "It is with admiration and gratitude for the great work he has done for the German people that I dedicate this book to the Führer."

On 26 July 1939 Laurie attended a dinner hosted by Oswald Mosley and Diana Mosley whose other attendees included the Conservative MPs Jocelyn Lucas, John Moore-Brabazon and Archibald Maule Ramsay; George Ward Price, the "extra-special correspondent" for The Daily Mail newspaper; Philip Farrar, the private secretary to Lord Salisbury; Admiral Barry Domvile of The Link; the journalist A. K. Chesterton; and the famous military historian J. F. C. Fuller. The main theme of the dinner was trying to find a way to stop the Danzig crisis from escalating into war, which those present at the dinner felt was the British Jewish community, who were the ones pushing for a war. The principal fear expressed by those attending the dinner was that if another war came, the British empire would be so weakened as to go into decline, thereby allowing so-called "inferior races" to take over the world.

In an article entitled "An Open Letter to the Young Men of Britain" published in Action, the official newspaper of the British Union of Fascists (BUF), on 2 September 1939, Laurie — who knew that Britain would almost certainly declare war on Germany the next day — appealed to British servicemen to desert rather than fight in what he called the "Jews' War". In "An Open Letter", Laurie began with the statement: "Germany has committed the unforgivable sin of refusing borrow money from international financiers and so they must be punished". Laurie argued that Britain had no quarrel with Germany and as such he argued that British servicemen should desert en masse to prevent what he called two "Aryan" peoples from destroying each other in a war that Laurie insisted was the result of a Jewish conspiracy. During the Phoney War of 1939–1940, Laurie attended meetings of various "patriotic" groups that worked for peace with Germany.

== Death ==
He died on 7 October 1949.

== Publications ==
Among Laurie's many technical writings are the following.

- The Food of Plants, (1893)
- Facts About Processes, Pigments, and Vehicles – a Manual for Art Students, (1895)
- Greek and Roman Methods of Painting, (1910)
- The Materials of the Painter's Craft in Europe and Egypt, from the Earliest Times to the End of the XVIIth Century, (1910)
- The Pigments and Mediums of the Old Masters, (1914)
- The Painter's Methods and Materials, (1926)
- A Study of Rembrandt and the Painting of his School, (1929)
- The Brush Work of Rembrandt and his School, (1932)
- Pictures and Politics, (1934)
- New Light on Old Masters, (1935)
- The Case for Germany, (1939)

== Bibliography ==
- Year Book of the Royal Society of Edinburgh 1950 (Session 1948–1949), Oliver and Boyd, Edinburgh, 1951.
- Who's Who 1938, A&C Black, London, 1937.
- Rawlins, FIG; Hartley, Harold; Farmer, RC; Stacey, M (1950). "Obituary notices: Arthur Pillans Laurie, 1861–1949; Sir Henry Miers, 1858–1942; Sir Robert Robertson, 1869–1949; F. E. Whitmore, 1923–1949". Journal of the Chemical Society: 429–441. doi:10.1039/JR9500000429.
- Griffiths, Richard (1980). Fellow Travellers of the Right British Enthusiasts for Nazi Germany, 1933-9. Oxford: Oxford University Press. ISBN 0094634602.
- Griffiths, Richard (1998). Patriotism Perverted Captain Ramsay, the Right Club, and British Anti-Semitism, 1939-1940. London: Faber & Faber. ISBN 9780571310456.
- Griffiths, Richard (2016). What Did You Do During the War? The Last Throes of the British Pro-Nazi Right, 1940-45. Taylor & Francis. ISBN 9781138888999.
- Novotný, Lukáš (2019). The British Legation in Prague Perception of Czech-German Relations in Czechoslovakia Between 1933 and 1938. Berlin: De Gruyter. ISBN 9783110651454.
- Stone, Daniel (2003). Responses to Nazism in Britain, 1933-1939 Before War and Holocaust. London: Palgrave Macmillan. ISBN 9780230505537.
- Winter, Barbara (2007). The Australia First Movement. Carindale: Interactive Publications. ISBN 9781876819910.
