= James Dick (slave trader) =

James Dick (c. 1743 – c. 1828) was a Scottish merchant, philanthropist and slave trader. Born in Forres, County of Moray, Dick left Scotland at the age of 19 and travelled to the West Indies, settling down in Kingston, Jamaica as a clerk in a local merchant house. In Jamaica, he established his own business importing enslaved people and exporting local produce to London, in the process becoming immensely wealthy. Dick returned to Britain and died c. 1828. Following his death, he bequeathed £113,787 to improve teaching among the schoolmasters in Scotland, which became known as the Dick Bequest. In recent years, the bequest has become controversial due to Dick's involvement in the Atlantic slave trade.

== Life ==
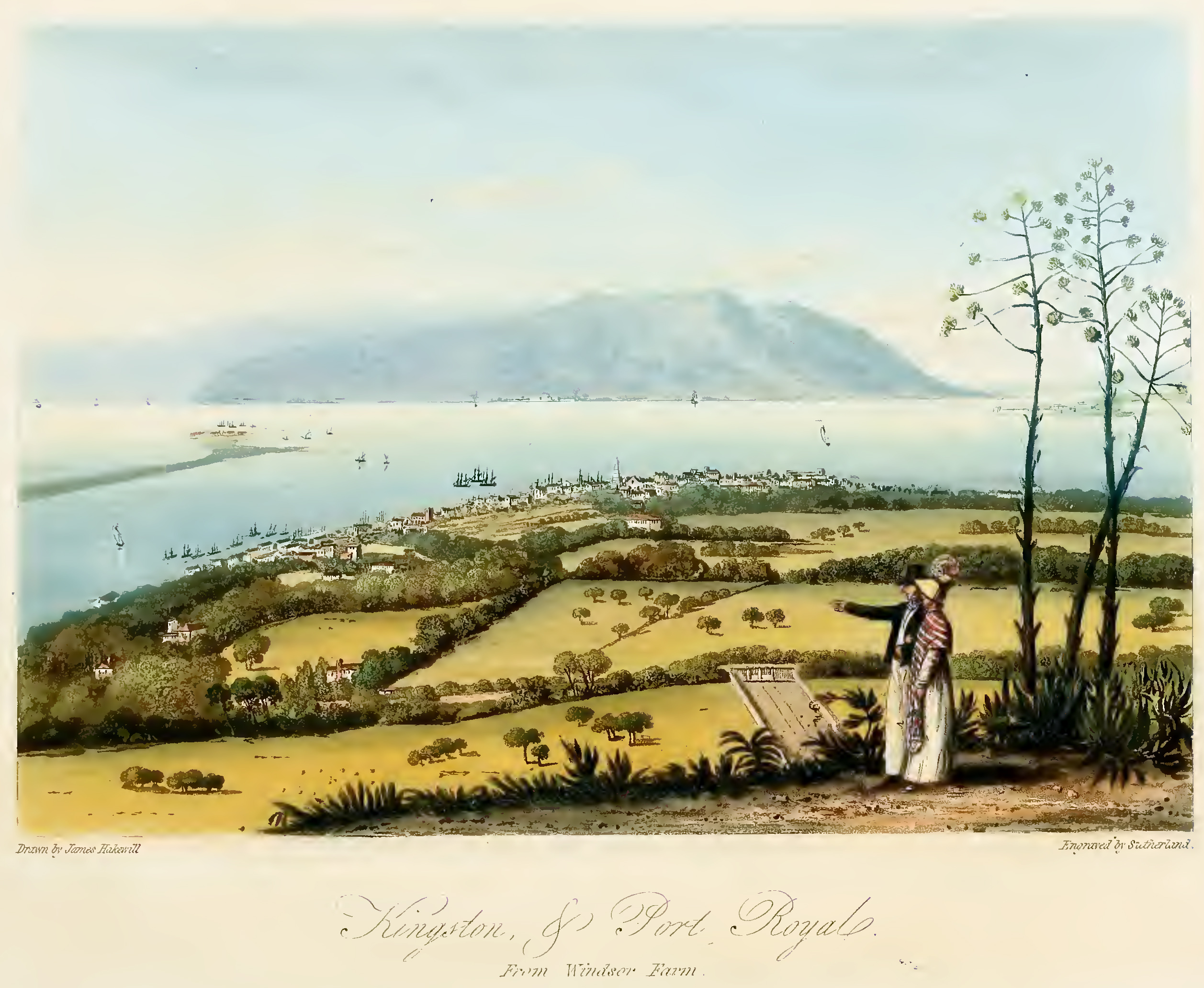
Kingston, Jamaica c. 1820

James Dick was born c. 1743 in Forres, County of Moray. His father was Alexander Dick, a shoemaker who sat on the Forres town council. Dick grew up in a house on Forres' High Street, and studied at a grammar school in Rafford while herding cattle during the summer break. Alexander employed him as his bookkeeper; while in this position, he fell in love with the family's domestic servant and desired to marry her. Due to his parents' objections, Dick left Scotland in 1762 at the age of 19 and travelled to the West Indies. He settled down in Kingston, Jamaica and found work as a clerk in a local merchant house.

== Slavery ==
Alongside his brother John, Dick established a business importing produce from Jamaica to London. During his time in Jamaica, he became involved in the Atlantic slave trade, being involved in the sale of more than 500 slaves imported from Africa in 1779 alone. After twenty years of working in Jamaica, Dick transferred his share of the business to John and returned to London a wealthy man. John sold the business when he retired and returned to Scotland, where he suddenly fell ill and died. As a result, John's fortune passed into Dick's control, further increasing his wealth before he died c. 1828.

== Dick Bequest ==
After providing for his daughter, Dick left £113,787 in his will for the establishment of a bequest to assist education institutions and their staff members in Aberdeenshire, Banffshire and the County of Moray. In his will, which further stipulated that a thirteen-person board of governors would be established to manage the bequest, Dick wrote that it was

my wish to form a fund for the benefit of that neglected though useful class of men, and to add to their present trifling salaries.

Most Scottish teachers were university graduates who taught while waiting to become a clergyman. Dick aimed to use his bequest to encourage them to remain as teachers. By 1833, the Dick Bequest's endowment yielded between £3,300 and £5,500 annually, growing it to around £200,000. Its funds were administered by trustees from to the Society of Writers to His Majesty's Signet; applicants were rigorously examined for suitability and were required to be proficient in teaching classical languages, humanities, mathematics and science, and those were successful had their salaries doubled. The Education (Scotland) Act 1872 changed how the Dick Bequest's grants were dispensed by ensuring that endowments were transferred to school boards. In their third report on endowed schools, a royal commission stated that

any fund has done so much good... no fund that has produced a shilling's worth for a shilling so fully as the Dick Bequest.

From 1856 to 1907, Scottish educator Simon Somerville Laurie served as the secretary to the Dick Bequest. In 1928, a group of beneficiaries of the bequest marked the anniversary of Dick's death by erecting a memorial in Forres dedicated to him. In recent years, the bequest has become controversial due to Dick's involvement in the slave trade. On 2 February 2023, the Moray Council voted to cut ties with the Dick Bequest due to Dick's slave-trading activities, removing a council member who was then sitting on the board of governors. A number of historians also urged the First Minister of Scotland, Humza Yousaf, to intervene and use the bequest's funds as reparations for slavery by sending it to Jamaica.
