= Johann Dick =

German murder victim

Johann Dick (23 March 1927 – 18 September 1986) was a citizen of West Germany who was shot and killed on the Czechoslovak border by soldiers from Czechoslovak Border Guard (Pohraniční stráž).

Johann Dick lived in Bavaria, and was a former soldier. In his retirement, his hobby was taking tours around the Bavarian border. On September 18, 1986, two Poles attempted to escape from Czechoslovakia into West Germany through the area where Dick was walking (one of the Poles succeeded). Eight guards, who were hunting the escapees, run into Dick, started to fire and wounded him fatally. Later, the guards found out that they had stepped 200 meters into Bavaria, and that the person they had shot was someone else. They dragged Dick into Czechoslovakia, where he died during transport to the hospital.

The incident grew into an international scandal. Czechoslovakia first claimed that Dick had crossed the border and that he was shot by Germans, but the evidence confuted that claim. The President of Czechoslovakia, Gustáv Husák, apologized, Dick's widow was given compensation of 100,000 German marks and the guards were punished, though very leniently (14 days in prison was the longest).

In 2001, the case was reopened. The three accused soldiers were eventually let free as it was impossible to prove exactly who had shot the tourist.
