= Dieck =

Dieck is a surname. Notable people with the surname include:

- Alfred Dieck (1906–1989), German archaeologist
- Cameron Dieck, New York City ballet dancer
- Georg Dieck (1847–1925), German entomologist and botanist
- Tim Dieck (born 1996), German ice dancer
