= Phallus tree =

Bawdy art motif in medieval Europe

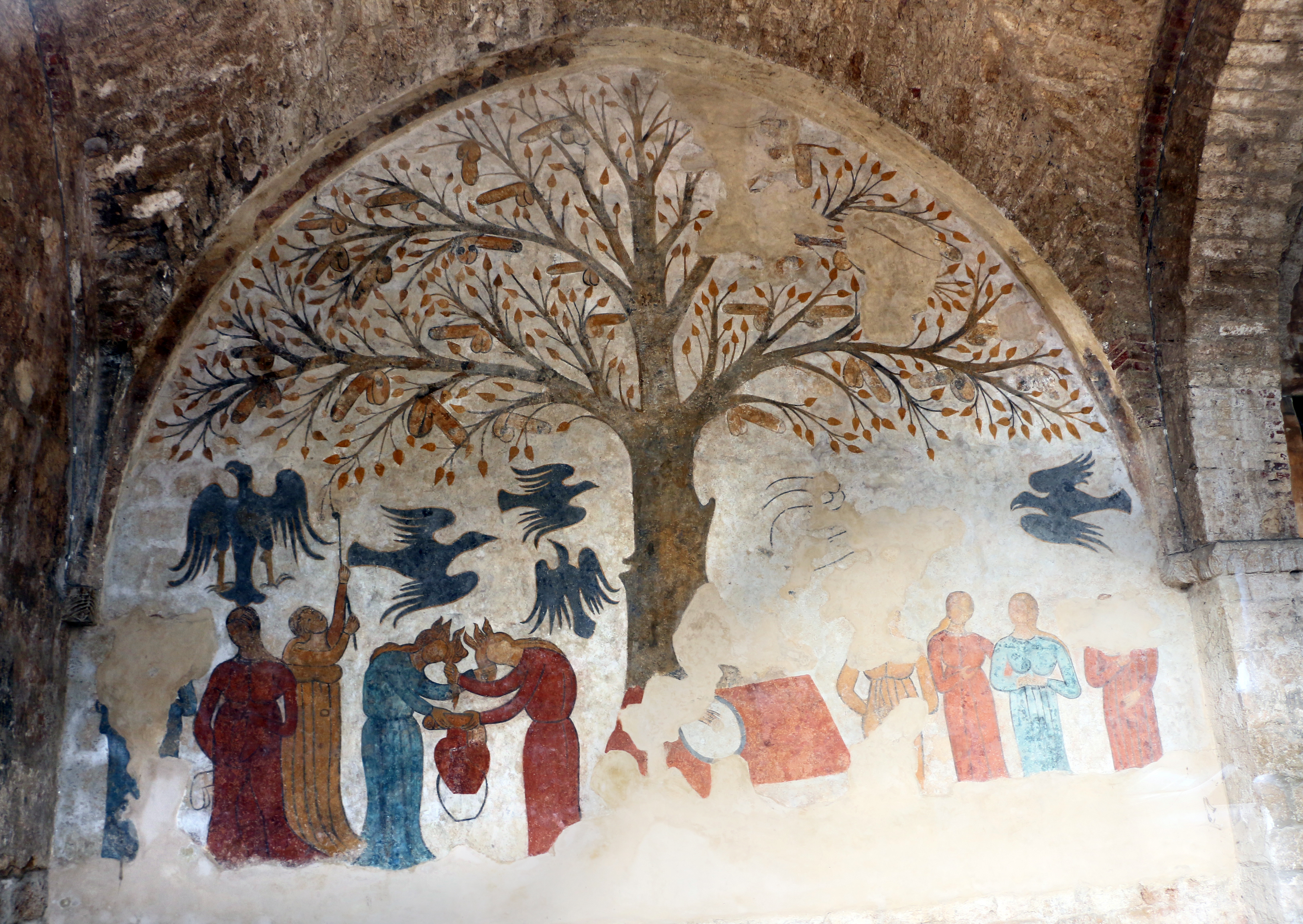
Phallus tree in the Fertility Fresco at Massa Marittima, circa 1265

The phallus tree was an art motif in Western Europe during the late Middle Ages and the beginning of the Renaissance.

Its concrete significance is hazy, but it appeared in bronze, illuminated manuscript, and paint; it manifested as bawdy humour, religious parody, political comment. The Tuscan Massa Marittima mural, featuring oversized phalluses, some erect, complete with testes, was Guelph propaganda warning that if the Ghibellines were allowed to take control, they would bring with them sexual perversion and witchcraft.

== Earlier forms ==
In addition to the striking phallic tree imagery in late medieval and Renaissance art, the symbols have roots that could be traced back to Roman times, especially through the figure of Priapus. Moser notes, "the phallus itself were magic, able to exist at the center of the area of the obscene without taint or injury." This idea emphasized that the phallus was not only a symbol of fertility but also a talisman against evil. This blend of fertility and protection weaves through different cultures and eras, improving our understanding of the phallus tree and its significance.
