= Amnon Dick =

Israeli businessman

- אמנון דיק
- Born: 1952 (age 73–74); Haifa, Israel
- Education: B.A. in Economics, Tel Aviv University; MBA, Recanati Graduate School of Business Administration
- Occupations: Businessman, Manager, Director
- Known for: CEO of Bezeq (2003–2005), Board member of Bank Hapoalim (2010–2018), President of Friends of Tel-Aviv University (since 2012)
- Children: 2 daughters

Amnon Dick (Hebrew: אמנון דיק; born 1952, Haifa) is an Israeli businessman, manager and director.

== Biography ==
Dick was born in Haifa in 1952. He studied at the Hebrew Reali School. He served as a maintenance officer in the Israeli Defense Force during the Yom Kippur War. After completing his military service, Dick began studying for a B.A. in Economics at Tel-Aviv University and after receiving his bachelor's degree he continued his studies and received an MBA from the Recanati Graduate School of Business Administration. A chance encounter with prominent Israeli businessman Mozi Wertheim, one of the owners and managers of the Central Bottling Company LTD - Coca-Cola Israel, led him upon graduation to a number of positions within the company. At the relatively young age of 29, Wertheim appointed Dick as the Marketing and Sales Manager of the conglomerate, a position which he held for 5 years.

His first position as CEO was at Ma'adanot (a company owned by Osem, Elite and Clal), which created during Dick's tenure the successful product "Pizza Makpizza". The new owner of Elite, British company Man and David Federman recruited Dick to the new management of the food corporation as deputy CEO. Later on, he served as CEO of Jafora (soft drinks) there he launched the successful soft drink "Tapuzina" and led the creation of Ein Gedi Mineral Water. Dick later managed the retailing chain "Shekem", and then returned to the food industry as CEO of Elite International. In 2003 Dick was appointed as CEO of Bezeq, the largest telecommunications group in Israel, which was then still a state-owned enterprise. Dick led Bezeq through a successful process of privatization and reorganization as a telecommunications group. Dick left his position at Bezeq in 2005. Dick is a shareholder and partner in the Israeli concessionaire of UPS - the world’s largest package delivery company and a provider of supply chain management solutions. In 2010 he became the Israeli partner in Hot Mobile (together with Patrick Drahi - founder and head of the French telecom group Altice and the owner of Hot (Israel)). He is also one of the owners of the Israeli regional radio station group which includes ECO 99FM, 103FM and Radio North.

Dick was a member of the board of directors of Bank Hapoalim, Israel's largest bank, between 2010 and 2018. In April 2018, Dick was selected to serve on Bezeq's board of directors as an external director, returning to the company 13 years after he completed his term as CEO. Dick was the only candidate put forward by Bezeq's institutional investors who was selected to join the board as part of a drive to improve the company's corporate governance following a high-profile criminal investigation regarding Bezeq's previous ownership and senior leadership. Due to the mandate set in Israel's Anti-Concentration Law forbidding directorship in both financial and non-financial companies, Dick resigned from Bank Hapoalim's board once he was selected to serve on Bezeq's board. Dick serves as the president of the "Friends of Tel-Aviv University" association since 2012 and is a member of the management of the Israeli branch of Transparency International. Dick lives in Tel-Aviv, he is married and has two daughters.
