= Dick James (disambiguation) =

Dick James may refer to:

- Dick James (1920–1986), British music publisher and singer
- Dick James (American football) (1934–2000), American football player
- Dick James (civil servant), UK citizen who was Director General of the Pacific Islands Forum Fisheries Agency
