= Dicks Butte =

Summit in Mendocino County, California, United States

- Location within California Location within the United States

Highest point
- Elevation: 6,300 ft (1,900 m)
- Prominence: 203 ft (62 m)
- Coordinates: 39°37′36.53″N 122°56′49.42″W

Geography
- Location: Mendocino County, California, United States
- Topo map: USGS Plaskett Ridge

Dicks Butte is a summit in Mendocino County, California, in the United States. With an elevation of 6,293 feet (1,918 m), this butte is the 1773rd highest summit in the state of California.
