= Ross M. Dick =

Founder of Society of American Business Editors and Writers

- Born: October 4, 1912; Moline, Illinois, United States
- Died: February 3, 1994 (aged 81)
- Education: Beloit College
- Occupation: Journalist
- Years active: 1937–1978
- Employer: The Milwaukee Journal
- Organization: Society of American Business Editors and Writers

Ross Melvin Dick (October 4, 1912 – February 3, 1994) was an American journalist who helped to found the Society of American Business Editors and Writers and served as the organization's fourth president.

== Early life ==
Dick was born on October 4, 1912, in Moline, Illinois, to Frances and Ross C. Dick.

Dick graduated from Beloit College in 1937, where he was a member of the Sigma Alpha Epsilon fraternity.

== Career ==
Dick began his journalism career as the Beloit correspondent for the Star and Register-Republic in Rockford, Illinois.

Dick joined The Milwaukee Journal in 1946, serving as the state news editor before becoming the business and financial editor later that year. He retired in 1978.

Dick helped found the Society for Advancing Business Editing and Writing. He served as the organization's treasurer in 1967, and fourth president in 1968.

== Personal life ==
Dick married Shirley Kretschmer on July 21, 1940. The couple had three children.

Dick died on February 3, 1994.
