= Philip Dicks =

English cricketer (born 1962)

Personal information
- Full name: Philip John Dicks
- Born: 4 May 1962 (age 64); Bristol, England
- Nickname: Dicksie, Bond
- Height: 6 ft 0 in (1.83 m)
- Batting: Right-handed
- Bowling: Right-arm off break

Domestic team information
- Years: Team
- 1991: Northumberland
- 1988–1990: Cambridgeshire

Career statistics
Competition	LA
Matches	2
Runs scored	35
Batting average	17.50
100s/50s	–/–
Top score	22
Balls bowled	–
Wickets	–
Bowling average	–
5 wickets in innings	–
10 wickets in match	–
Best bowling	–
Catches/stumpings	–/–
- Source: Cricinfo, 28 November 2010

Philip John Dicks (born 4 May 1962) is a former English cricketer. Dicks was a right-handed batsman who bowled right-arm off break and slow-medium swingers. He was born in Bristol, Gloucestershire.

Dicks made his Minor Counties Championship debut for Cambridgeshire against Hertfordshire in 1988. From 1988 to 1990, he represented the county in 19 Minor Counties Championship matches, the last of which against Durham. He made his debut in the MCCA Knockout Trophy in 1988 against Norfolk. From 1988 to 1989, he represented the county in 6 Trophy matches, the last of which came against Bedfordshire.

It was for Cambridgeshire that he made 2 List A appearances. These came against Warwickshire in the 1988 NatWest Trophy and Worcestershire in the 1989 NatWest Trophy. In his 2 List A matches, he scored 35 runs at a batting average of 17.50, with a high score of 22.

In 1991 he played a single Minor Counties Championship match for Northumberland against Norfolk.

Dicks has one son, named Michael. He currently resides in Newcastle-upon-Tyne.
