= Dick (slang) =

English vulgar term for the human penis

- Pronunciation: /dɪk/

Definition
- In a literal sense: A human penis
- Figuratively: Noun: A rude, abrasive, inconsiderate, or otherwise contemptible individual. (derogatory); A detective. (See also § Other slang); Absolutely nothing.; Sexual intercourse with a man.; Verb: To mistreat or take advantage of somebody. (often used with the words around or up, similar to fuck around)

Dick (/dɪk/) is a common English slang word for the human penis. It is also used by extension for a variety of slang purposes, generally considered vulgar, including as a verb to describe sexual activity and as a pejorative term for individuals who are considered to be rude, abrasive, inconsiderate, or otherwise contemptible. In this context, it can be used interchangeably with jerk, and can also be used as a verb to describe rude or deceitful actions. Variants include dickhead, which literally refers to the glans. The offensiveness of the word dick is complicated by the continued use of the word in inoffensive contexts, including as both a given name (often a nickname for Richard) and a surname, the popular British dessert spotted dick, the novel Moby-Dick, the Dick and Jane series of children's books, and the American retailer Dick's Sporting Goods. Uses such as these have provided a basis for comedy writers to exploit this juxtaposition through double entendre.

== Origin and evolution of the pejorative slang ==
In the mid-17th century, dick became slang for a man as a sexual partner. For example, in the 1665 satire The English Rogue by Richard Head, a "dick" procured to impregnate a character that is having difficulty conceiving:

The next Dick I pickt up for her was a man of a colour as contrary to the former, as light is to darkness, being swarthy; whose hair was as black as a sloe; middle statur'd, well set, both strong and active, a man so universally tryed, and so fruitfully successful, that there was hardly any female within ten miles gotten with child in hugger-mugger, but he was more than suspected to be Father of all the legitimate. Yet this too, proved an ineffectual Operator.

An 1869 slang dictionary offered definitions of dick including "a riding whip" and an abbreviation of "dictionary", also noting that in the North Country, it was used as a verb to indicate that a policeman was eyeing the subject. The term came to be associated with the penis through usage by men in the military around the 1880s.

The usage of dick to refer to a contemptible or despicable person was first attested in the 1960s.

=== Offensiveness ===
"Dick", when used in many of its slang connotations, is generally considered at least mildly offensive.

In 1994, the United States District Court for the District of Massachusetts upheld a school policy under which a student was prohibited from wearing a T-shirt with a double entendre, reading "See Dick Drink. See Dick Drive. See Dick Die. Don’t be a Dick." The court in this case held that a legitimate goal of the school—to calm a sexually charged environment and enhance the ability of students to learn—made it unlikely that this restriction was a violation of any First Amendment rights. This decision was vacated the following year by the United States Court of Appeals for the First Circuit, which noted that students have the right to express their views, and that the T-shirt, "though reasonably thought vulgar", did express a view.

In 2001, the United States Federal Communications Commission (FCC) published guidelines that summarized instances in which a number of media outlets had violated indecency laws when using the word "dick" in a sexual context. These included, for example, the State University of New York's WSUC-FM, in Cortland, New York, which in 1993 was fined for broadcasting a rap titled "I'm Not Your Puppet", which referenced "shoving my dick up this bitch's behind" in one lyric, and stated in another, "I pulled out my dick, popped it in her mouth, and she sucked it." In the same report, however, the FCC noted that in 1990, it had ruled that WFBQ (FM)/WNDE (AM) in Indianapolis had not engaged in indecency when it broadcast the line "So you talk to Dick Nixon, man you get him on the phone and Dick suggests maybe getting like a mega-Dick to help out, but you know, you remember the time the king ate mega-Dick under the table at a 095 picnic", and a parody commercial referencing a fictional monster truck called "Big Peter! Formerly the Big Dick's Dog Wiener Mobile". In January 2005, the FCC released a ruling that it would not fine broadcasters whose programs used "dick" on the air to refer to a person behaving contemptibly. Specifically, the FCC stated in its ruling:

A number of complaints cite isolated uses of the word "dick" or variations thereof. In context and as used in the complained of broadcasts, these were epithets intended to denigrate or criticize their subjects. Their use in this context was not sufficiently explicit or graphic and/or sustained to be patently offensive.

The name of the traditional British dessert spotted dick has occasionally been perceived as potentially embarrassing, prompting hospital managers at Gloucestershire NHS Trust (in 2001) and the catering staff at Flintshire County Council (in 2009) to rename the pudding Spotted Richard on menus, as many customers made "immature comments" about the pudding. Gloucestershire NHS Trust restored the original name in 2002 and Flintshire County Council reversed their renaming after a few weeks.

=== Derivative meaning ===
The word dick is used in the sense of "nothing", a figurative use of the sense "penis" (similar to the use of fuck and shit in a similar sense), as in "Nowadays you don't mean dick to me".

== Other slang ==
Dick is used as a slang term for detective, as in "hiring a private dick to help locate her natural mother". This meaning may derive from the Roma slang dekko, dekker from Romani dik, meaning "to look".

== See also ==
- Cock (slang)
- Dick joke
- Insult
- Prick (slang)
