= Barry Dick =

Australian journalist

Barry Dick is an Australian journalist. He retired in 2015, after more than 40 years as a sports reporter and editor in Brisbane. Dick was the rugby league editor for The Courier-Mail, and wrote the For Argument's Sake column during the football season.

Dick was the first full-time Australian football writer for The Courier-Mail in 1973. During his career there, he was Melbourne bureau chief and held several editor positions. He is currently sports editor of The Courier-Mail's website.

In 2017, Dick was inducted in the Suncorp Stadium Wall of Fame in Brisbane.
