= King Size Dick =

German singer

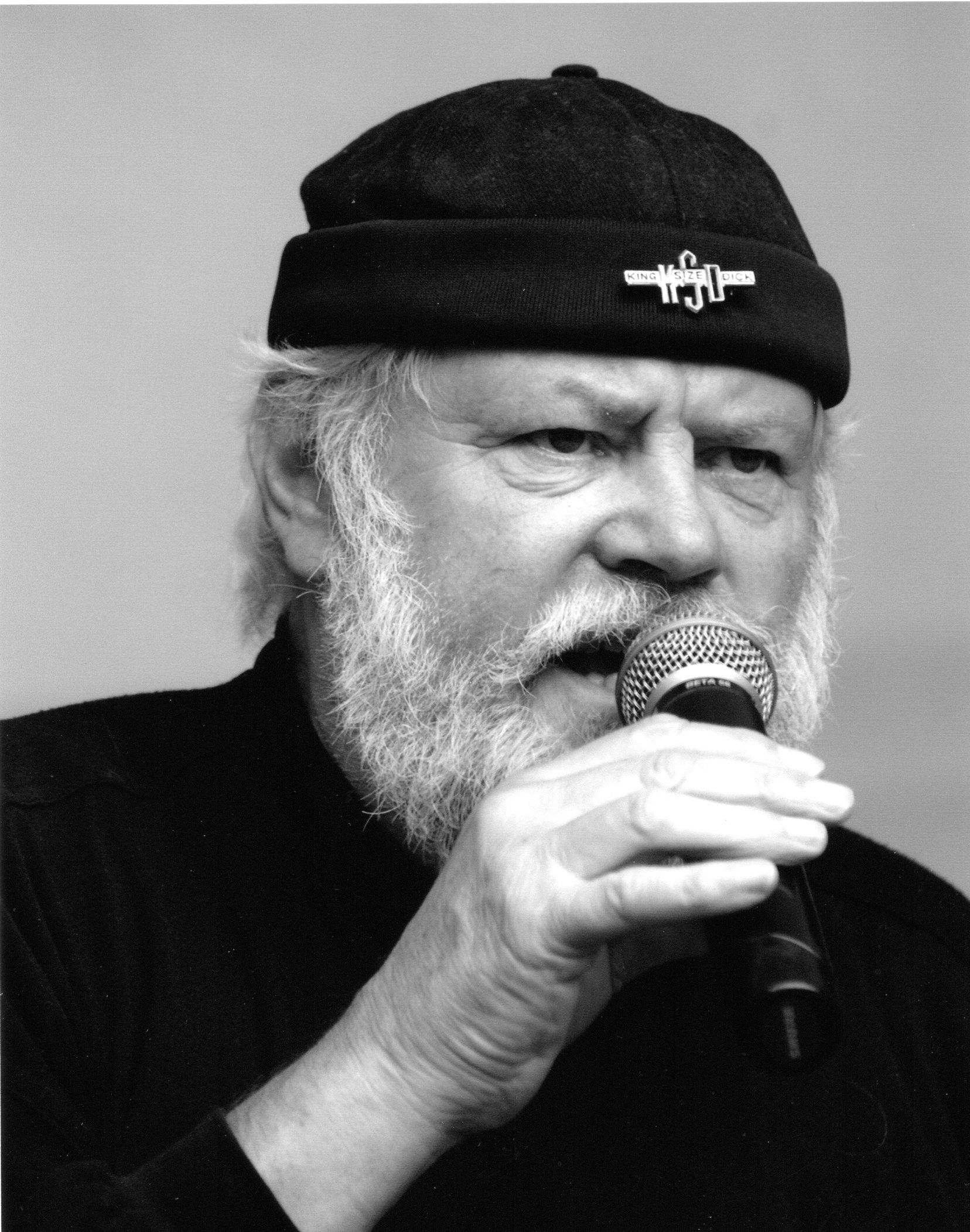
- King Size Dick in 2009

Background information
- Born: Heinz Ganss; 29 December 1942 (age 83); Cologne, Germany
- Genres: Rock
- Occupation: Singer

King Size Dick (born Heinz Ganss; 29 December 1942) is a German rock singer who mainly sings in the Colognian dialect.

== Biography ==
King Size Dick, a truck driver by profession, began his musical career in the 1960s in his home town of Cologne in several smaller musical bands. The first band he was a member of was called "Dick & The Shade". Whilst serving in the armed forces in Wales, he was a guest singer in a band called Brian Poole & The Tremeloes.

In the 1970s, he performed together with the Bläck Fööss, whilst also working as their truck driver. He usually took on the role of singing the band's successful song "Linda Lou", which has since been inextricably associated with the name King Size Dick.

At the end of the 1970s, he joined the "Formation Dick & Alex", together with guitarist and songwriter Alex Parche. They played German rock music songs such as Schweine in weißen Westen (which translates to 'pigs in white vests').

== Awards ==
King Size Dick is the bearer of the 2002 Willi Ostermann medal, the highest official award of the Cologne Carnival.

== Origin of stage name ==
While Ganss was stationed in Wales with the German armed forces, he was asked to perform locally at social events, such as birthdays, which were potluck. In Cologne, overweight people are at times given the nickname Dick, from the German adjective which means 'fat'. Another example of the use of the German adjective as a nickname is for the comedy duo of Laurel and Hardy, which Germans often refer to as "Dick und Doof", meaning 'fat and stupid'. Thus the adjective dick became a nickname for Ganss. During one of the social gatherings in Wales, someone asked Heinz Ganss his name. He replied "Dick", referring to the German adjective for 'fat', or 'large', or 'bigger'. The person who asked him presumed that this was a German word and asked what the German word "dick" meant in English. Heinz Ganss replied: "large". "Oh", replied the Welshman and paraphrased: "king size". Ganss stuck to that and thus his stage name remained "King Size Dick" ('big and fat'), with no intended phallic connotation. In the Colognian dialect, the German adjective dick [dɪk] translates to deck [dék] as opposed to Dick which in Colognian, like in English, is also regarded a variation of the Christian name "Richard". Back home, his nickname and stage name remained "Dick", even in the Colognian dialect.

== Discography (selection) ==
=== Albums ===
- Wä op Zack es... (1979)
- Esu ben ich (1981)
- Letzte Naach (1990)
- Weihnachts-Zick (1991)
- Et Bess us "Kölle am Rhing" (1993)
- Kölsche Spezialitäten (1995)
- Loss mer all noh'm Dom jonn (1996)
- Jeseechter vun mir (2003)
- Weihnacht (2009)

=== Singles ===
- Macho-girl (1990)
- Wapapapa u.a. (1991)
- Kölle my love (1995)
- Halleluja (1995)
- Föttchensföhler Manni (1997)
- Luur ens Mathilde (1997)
- Ming Stadt am Rhing (1998)
- Marisha (2001)
- Kölsche Evergreens (2007)
- C'est la vie leev Marie (2010)
