= Franklin Archibald Dick =

American jurist and military officer

Franklin Archibald Dick (May 2, 1823 – February 18, 1885) was an American lawyer, politician and military officer during the American Civil War. He served as a Republican member of the Missouri state legislature and worked with Francis P. Blair Jr. to oppose slavery in Missouri. He served as volunteer assistant adjutant general to Brigadier General Nathaniel Lyon in the struggle to prevent Missouri secession to the Confederacy that resulted in the Camp Jackson Affair. He also served as Missouri provost marshal general and lieutenant colonel under Major General Samuel Curtis. After the war, he worked as a law partner with Montgomery Blair at the Blair House in Washington, D.C.

== Early life and education ==
Dick was born in Chester, Pennsylvania on May 2, 1823, the only son of Archibald Thomas Dick and Hannah Rogers. He entered the University of Pennsylvania at the age of sixteen in 1839 as a law student. He graduated in 1842 and moved to the then frontier town of St. Louis, Missouri, where he practiced law from 1844 to 1861. He worked as an assistant editor at the St. Louis Democrat newspaper. He was an active supporter of the movement to abolish slavery and joined the Free Soil Party in 1849. He became a member of the Republican Party upon its founding in 1854. In 1857, he was elected to the Missouri legislature and voted for the end of slavery in Missouri.

He married Myra Madison Alexander on November 25, 1851. Myra's sister, Apolline, was married to Francis Preston Blair Jr., a Missouri congressman and Unionist leader. Dick helped organize the business affairs of Blair when he fell into debt after the 1857 depression.

== American Civil War ==
=== Camp Jackson affair ===
After the election of President Lincoln, the pro-secessionist governor of Missouri, Clairborne F. Jackson was expected to lead Missouri to secede from the Union. Dick, Blair and other pro Union advocates in the city of St. Louis were concerned that Jackson would take possession of the St. Louis Arsenal and use the large stock of arms kept there to support Confederate leaning militias. Blair and Captain (later brigadier general) Nathaniel Lyon transferred the arms from the St. Louis Arsenal to Alton, Illinois to prevent their capture and usage by pro-confederacy militias.

In mid-April 1861, Jackson wrote to Confederate President Jefferson Davis, asking for heavy artillery to breach the walls of the arsenal. Around May 1, Jackson called up part of the Missouri Volunteer Militia (MVM) for "maneuvers" near St. Louis, under the command of Brigadier General Daniel M. Frost. The MVM set up Camp Jackson, about 4.5 miles (7.2 km) northwest of the arsenal.

Davis agreed to Jackson's request and delivered two 12-pound howitzers, two 32-pound siege guns, 500 muskets, and ammunition. MVM officers met the shipment at the St. Louis riverfront, and transported them to Camp Jackson.

Lyon wanted to scout Camp Jackson for himself. Dick borrowed a dress, shawl and bonnet from his mother in law in order to disguise the general. Dick provided the carriage and Lyon was able to observe the camp from inside the carriage disguised as Dick's mother in law and reported back that secessionist flags were flown within the camp and Confederate guns were located at the camp.

On May 10, 1861, Lyon, Blair, and other Unionists met in Dick's law office and decided to capture Camp Jackson. At Lyon's urging, Dick served as his volunteer assistant adjutant general during the Camp Jackson affair. Lyon, with the Home Guards and a U.S. regular Army company, captured several hundred secessionist state militia which had been positioned to seize the Arsenal. The Camp Jackson Affair gave the Federal cause a decisive initial advantage in Missouri but also inflamed secessionist sentiments in the state.

Dick was sent by Blair to Washington to convey concerns to President Lincoln about General William S. Harney's leniency in dealing with secessionists. Montgomery Blair took Dick to meet with President Lincoln and Secretary of War Simon Cameron. Dick had been directed to lobby for Nathaniel Lyon's ideas for the protection of St. Louis, ask for Lyon's confirmation as brigadier general, and request Harney's removal. Dick returned to St. Louis with Lincoln's promotion for Lyon effective May 17, and an order for Blair to remove Harney at his discretion. When Harney met with the former governor and head of the Missouri State Guard, Sterling Price, the Union supporters led by Blair delivered the orders on May 30, 1862, which opened the way for Lyon to take control of troops in Missouri.

Dick continued to write letters to Lincoln with updates on the state of affairs in Missouri.

=== Provost marshal general ===
After Camp Jackson was disbanded, Missouri was under martial law, and remained so for the entire Civil War. Dick served on the Board of Assessments which identified and fined Southern sympathizers. Through his participation in the seizure of goods and banishment of Rebels and their families, he earned the hatred of many old St. Louisans, Conditional Unionists, and Rebels.

On November 5, 1862, Dick was commissioned by Governor Hamilton Rowan Gamble as aide-de-camp to Major General Samuel Curtis with the rank of lieutenant colonel. General Curtis assigned Dick as provost marshal general for the Department of Missouri which included the states of Missouri, Arkansas, Iowa, Kansas and sections of Illinois and Tennessee. In this position, Dick was responsible to keep order in the state and oversee the local provost marshals, enforce Curtis's orders for the Confiscation Act of 1862, banish and assess disloyal persons, and supervise prisons and prisoners.

Dick moved his family back and forth from St. Louis to Philadelphia for safety during the war, though he had to return to his law practice in St. Louis to earn a living. He was superseded as provost marshal general by James Brodhead.

== After the war ==
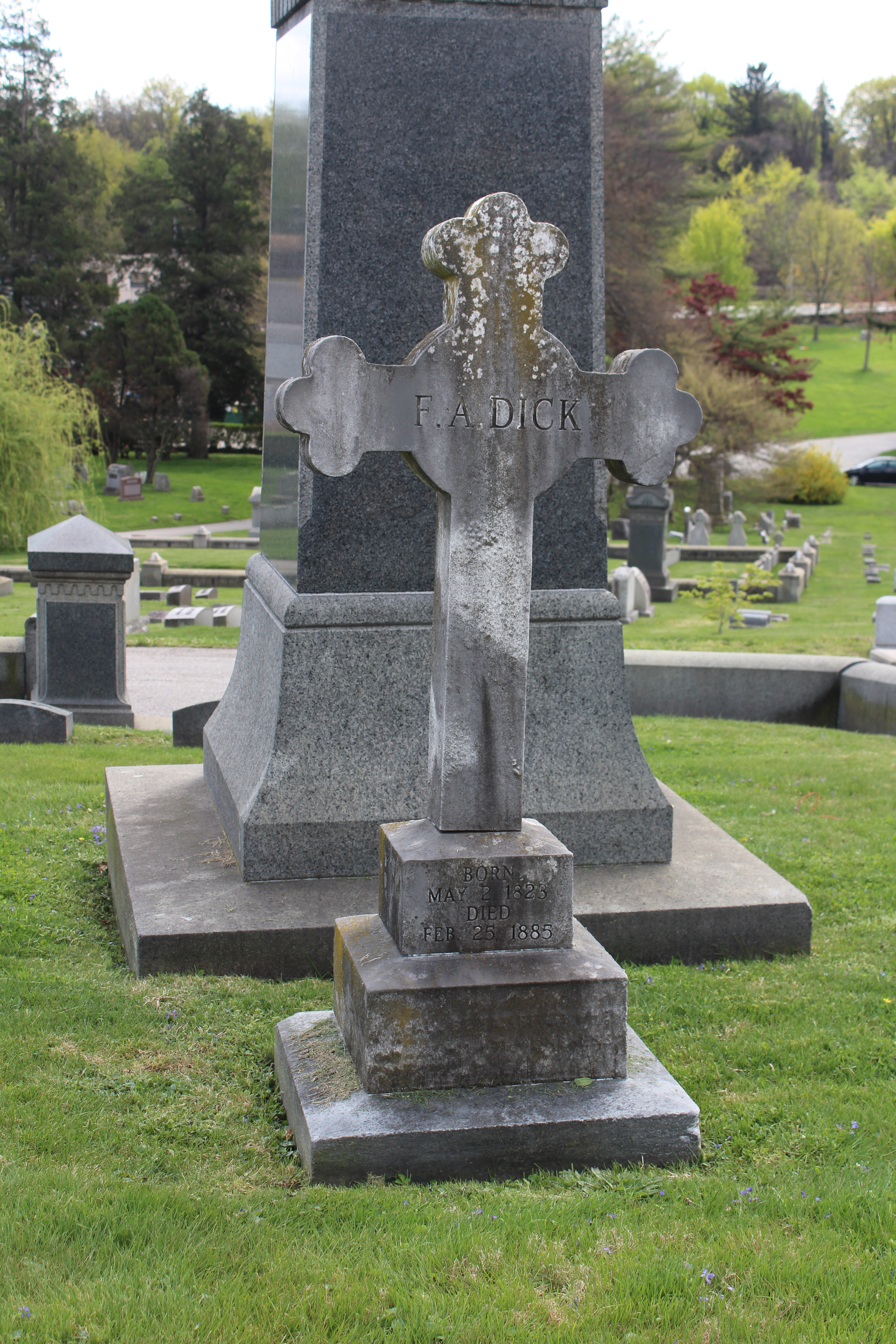
Franklin Archibald Dick gravestone in Laurel Hill Cemetery

After the Civil War ended, at the urging of Francis P. Blair Sr., Dick practiced law with Montgomery Blair, working out of offices in the Blair House on Pennsylvania Avenue across from the White House. The Blair House is now the official guest house for the White House. Dick purchased a summer home he named "Hillside" near West Chester, Pennsylvania. Dick died on February 18, 1885, and was interred in Laurel Hill Cemetery in Philadelphia, Pennsylvania.

== Sources ==
- Adamson, Hans Christian (2016). Rebellion in Missouri 1861: Nathaniel Lyon and His Army of the West. Pickle Partners Publishing. ISBN 9781786256423.
- Franklin Archibald Dick, Gari Carter (2008). Troubled state. Truman State University. ISBN 978-1-931112-74-1.
- Gerteis, Louis. Civil War St. Louis, Lawrence: University Press of Kansas, 2001
- Laas, Virginia Jeans. Wartime Washington: The Civil War Letters of Elizabeth Blair Lee. Urbana:University of Illinois Press, 1999
- Martin, John Hill (1877). Chester (and Its Vicinity,) Delaware County, in Pennsylvania. Wm. H. Pile & Sons.
- Parrish, Warren Earl (1998). Frank Blair: Lincoln's Conservative. Columbia and London: University of Missouri Press. ISBN 0-8262-1156-9.
- Winter, William C. The Civil War in St. Louis: A Guided Tour. St. Louis: Missouri Historical Society Press, 1994
