= Robert Dick (cricketer) =

English cricketer

Robert Douglas Dick (16 April 1889 – 14 December 1983) was an English first-class cricketer, who played one game for Yorkshire County Cricket Club in 1911.

Born in Middlesbrough, Yorkshire, Dick was a right arm fast bowler, who took two wickets for 37 runs in the match against Nottinghamshire at The Circle, Hull. He was less successful with the bat, scoring two runs in his only first-class innings. Yorkshire won the game by 225 runs, thanks to batting from David Denton (74 & 101*) and 9 wickets from Major Booth. Dick also played for the Yorkshire Second XI in the same year.

Robert Dick died in December 1983, in Guisborough, Yorkshire, aged 94.
