= Dyck =

Dyck is a form of the Dutch surname (van) Dijck, which is also common among Russian Mennonites.

== People ==
- Aganetha Dyck (born 1937), Canadian artist
- Albert Van Dyck (1902–1951), Belgian painter
- Anthony van Dyck (1599–1641), Flemish artist
- Arnold Dyck (1889-1970), Canadian author
- Beverly Milton Dyck (1936–2012), Canadian politician
- Christopher H. van Dyck (born 1955), American psychiatrist
- Cornelius Van Alen Van Dyck (1818–1895), American missionary physician and teacher
- Dagmar Dyck (born 1972), New Zealand artist
- Daniel van den Dyck (1610–1670), Flemish painter
- Ed Dyck (1950–2017), Canadian ice hockey player
- Erika Dyck (born 1975), Canadian historian
- Ernest Van Dyck (1861–1923), Belgian opera singer
- Floris van Dyck (1575–1651), Dutch painter
- Gabriel Dyck (born 1999), Canadian curler
- Henri Van Dyck (1849–1934), Belgian painter
- Henry Dyck (1912–1993), Canadian ice hockey player
- Henry H. Van Dyck (1809–1888), American politician
- Hermann Dyck (1812–1874), German painter
- Howard Dyck (born 1942), Musical artist
- Ian Dyck (1954–2007), Canadian historian
- Jeff van Dyck (born 1969), Musical artist
- Jens Dyck (born 1990), Belgian footballer
- Jim Dyck (1922–1999), American baseball player
- Jim Dyck (1922–1999), American baseball player
- Joel Dyck (born 1971), Japanese-Canadian ice hockey player
- Johann Gottfried Dyck (1750–1813), German bookseller and author
- Jonathan Dyck, Canadian graphic novelist
- Justin G. Dyck, Canadian film director
- Karen Van Dyck (born 1961), American classicist
- Larry Dyck (born 1965), Canadian ice hockey player
- Lillian Dyck (born 1945), Retired Canadian senator
- Linda van Dyck (1948–2023), Dutch actress
- Lionel Dyck (1944–2024), Zimbabwean mercenary and soldier
- Louis van Dyck (1862–1937), Belgian Roman-Catholic priest and missionary
- Max Van Dyck (1902–1992), Belgian painter
- Mical Dyck (born 1982), Canadian cyclist
- Nolan Dyck, Canadian politician from Alberta
- Paul Dyck (born 1971), Canadian ice hockey player
- Peter Dyck (1946–2020), Canadian politician
- Peter J. Dyck (1914–2010), Canadian Mennonite relief worker and pastor
- Peter Van Dyck (1684–1751), American silversmith
- Rand Dyck (born 1943), Canadian political scientist
- Richard Van Dyck (born 1717), American silversmith, engraver, and importer
- Sally Dyck, American minister
- Stephen van Dyck (born 1983), American writer and artist
- Steve Van Dyck (born 2000), Australian mammalogist
- Vedder Van Dyck (1889–1960), American bishop
- Walther von Dyck (1856–1934), German mathematician
- William V. B. Van Dyck (1875–1981), American football player and coach, electrical engineer and businessman

== Fictional characters ==
- Elsie Dyck, fictional Mennonite writer in Andrew Unger's novel Once Removed
- Harry Dyck, recurring character in The Daily Bonnet
- Noah and Anita Dyck, fictional Mennonite couple in the television show Letterkenny
- A common misspelling of the movie Dick since the movie's box art title and logo on the trailer have the hands of a person pointed out to shape like a "Y".

== See also ==
- Dick (surname)
- Dyck language
- Dyke (disambiguation) or Dike, Van Dyke (disambiguation)
- Dueck or Dück (surname)
