= Richard Van Dyke =

Richard Van Dyke may refer to:

- Dick Van Dyke (Richard Wayne Van Dyke, born 1925), American actor and comedian
- Dick van Dyke (politician) (Richard Gerard van Dyke, 1931–1986), American politician in the state of Washington

== See also ==
- Richard Van Dyck (1717–1770), American silversmith
