= Dueck =

Dueck or Dück is a German surname, a spelling variety of Dyck, which mostly comes from the Dutch surname (van) Dijck. The name is wide spread among Russian Mennonites. It may refer to:

- Alexander Dück (born April 22, 1980), German professional ice hockey player
- Alvin Dueck (born 1943), American psychologist and theologian
- Dora Dueck (born 1950), Canadian writer
- Josh Dueck (born January 13, 1981), Canadian alpine skier
- Peter Albert Dueck (July 5, 1923 – February 19, 2015), politician and cabinet minister of British Columbia
- Tyler Dueck (born December 17, 1986), Canadian racing driver
- Vassily Dück (born January 23, 1967) German accordionist

== See also ==
- Duck (surname)
