= Mediatised houses =

Type of ruling house in the former Holy Roman Empire

The mediatised houses (or mediatized houses; German: Standesherren) were ruling princely and comital-ranked houses that were mediatised in the Holy Roman Empire during the period from 1803 to 1815 as part of German mediatisation, and were later recognised during the period from 1825 to 1829 by the German ruling houses as possessing considerable rights and rank. With few exceptions, these houses were those whose heads held a seat in the Imperial Diet when mediatised during the establishment of the Confederation of the Rhine in 1806–07, by France in 1810, or by the Congress of Vienna in 1814–15. The mediatised houses were organised into two ranks: the princely houses, entitled to the predicate Durchlaucht (Serene Highness), which previously possessed a vote on the Bench of Princes (Furstenbank); and the comital houses that were accorded the address of Erlaucht (Illustrious Highness), which previously possessed a vote in one of the four Benches of Counts (Gräfenbank). Although some forms of mediatisation occurred in other countries, such as France, Italy, and Russia, only designated houses within the former Holy Roman Empire were legally mediatised houses.

== Privileges ==
Mediatised houses generally possessed greater rights than other German noble families. Whilst they lost sovereignty and certain rights (such as legislation, taxation, appellate jurisdiction, and control over policing and conscription) in their territories, they often still retained their private estates and some feudal rights, which may have included exclusive or primary access to local forestry, fishing, mining or hunting resources, jurisdiction over policing and lower level civil and criminal court cases. Mediatised houses also possessed the right to settle anywhere within the German Confederation while retaining their territorial prerogatives. The Congress of Vienna specified that the mediatised houses were recognised as the first vassals in their respective states, were usually entitled to membership in the legislative upper chambers in which their lands lay (such as the Austrian or Prussian House of Lords), and held rank equivalent to ruling houses. However, the Congress of Vienna did not specify which families were considered mediatised.

Members of mediatised houses possessed a rank higher than other German ducal, princely and comital families which held the same or even a higher hereditary title. For example, a prince (Fürst) of a mediatised house ranked higher than a duke (Herzog) of a family that had never possessed Imperial immediacy, even though in Germany, nominally, a duke is of higher rank than a prince.

== Equality of birth ==
Most importantly, members of the mediatised houses were recognized as entitled to retain the equality of birth their families had enjoyed under the Holy Roman Empire with Germany's reigning dynasties, who inter-married by right with the other ruling houses of Europe. Although this privilege did not automatically require that every ruling family had to accept all members of mediatised families as eligible for dynastic inter-marriage (see Countess Auguste von Harrach), each mediatised family was allowed to impose its own marital standards by house law, and could be accepted by ruling families without legal demur. This had practical effects in determining whether a marriage was considered morganatic and what rights the children of such a marriage might possess.

It was ultimately left up to each sovereign state to determine which families were counted as part of the mediatised houses and which were not, leading to discrepancies between the roster of the Imperial Diet in 1806 and the families counted amongst the mediatised. Before 1806, the term "exemption" was used to refer to states that surrendered their immediacy and high jurisdiction rights to another state but retained their votes in the Imperial Diet. Not all exempt houses were counted amongst the mediatised houses. Further discrepancies exist because the houses were mediatised between 1806–1814 and the rosters of the princely and comital mediatised houses were not drawn up until 1825 and 1829 respectively. During that period, some families had become extinct or sold those of their territories to which the rights of mediatisation appertained.

From 1836 the Almanach de Gotha listed the mediatised houses in a section of their own, separate from both ruling dynasties and from princely and ducal families which were not recognized as having exercised sovereignty since the Congress of Vienna.

The rights of the mediatised houses in Austria and Czechoslovakia were abolished in 1919, following the defeat of Austria-Hungary in World War I and the establishment of republics in those countries. Rights were also abolished in Germany in 1919, however, the abolition was not initially enforced.

The following lists are exhaustive, including all of the mediatised houses.

== List of Princely mediatised houses (Durchlaucht) ==
Name	Title	Listed by	Head of house (as of July 2018)	Notes
Arenberg	Duke	Austria, Prussia, Hanover	Léopold, 13^{th} Duke (b. 1956)	The territories of Arenberg were annexed by France and ceded by the Empire in the Treaty of Campo Formio in 1797. Received the counties of Vest Recklinghausen and Meppen in 1803. Joined the Confederation of the Rhine in 1806. Annexed by France and the Grand Duchy of Berg in 1810. Not restored by the Congress of Vienna
Auersperg	Prince	Austria	Adolf, 11^{th} Prince (b. 1937)	The county of Thengen mediatised by Baden in 1806, and rights to this territory sold to it in 1811. Held mediate to Austria the duchy of Gottschee and the princely county of Wels, and several minor territories
Bentheim and Steinfurt	Prince; Count before 1817	Austria, Hanover, Prussia	Carl Ferdinand, 5^{th} Prince (b. 1977)	County of Steinfurt mediatised by Berg in 1806. Annexed by France in 1810. Awarded to Hanover 1815 (Bentheim-Bentheim and Bentheim-Steinfurt, which were under personal union, were united into the singular house). A branch of the House of Bentheim
Bentheim-Tecklenburg	Prince; Count before 1817	Austria, Hanover, Prussia	Maximilian, 7^{th} Prince (b. 1969)	County of Limburg and lordship of Rheda mediatised by Berg in 1806. Awarded to Prussia in 1815. A branch of the House of Bentheim
Castell-Castell	Prince; Count before 1901	Bavaria	Ferdinand, 4^{th} Prince (b. 1965)	mediatised by Bavaria in 1806
Castell-Rüdenhausen	Prince; Count before 1901	Bavaria	Otto, 6^{th} Prince (b. 1985)	mediatised by Bavaria in 1806
Colloredo-Mansfeld	Prince	Austria, Württemberg	Hieronymus, 8^{th} Prince (b. 1949)	Purchased a part of the County of Rieneck in 1803 because its Imperial immediacy granted him a seat in the Imperial Diet. Mediatised by the Principality of Aschaffenburg in 1806. Purchased lordship of Limpurg-Gröningen in 1804. Mediatised by Württemberg in 1806, rights to this territory were sold to it in 1837. Held mediate to Austria several minor territories
Croÿ	Duke	Austria, Prussia	Rudolf, 15^{th} Duke (b. 1955)	The territories of Croÿ were annexed by France and ceded by the Empire in the Treaty of Campo Formio in 1797. Received the lordship of Dülmen in 1803. Mediatised to Arenberg in 1806. Annexed by France 1810. Awarded to Prussia 1815
Dietrichstein	Prince	Austria, Württemberg	Extinct	Lordship of Tarasp, exempt under Austria, ceded to Graubünden in 1801. Received the lordship of Neu-Ravensburg in 1803. Mediatised by Württemberg in 1806. Extinct 1864
Erbach-Schönberg	Prince; Count before 1903	Hesse-Darmstadt	Dietrich, 5^{th} Prince (b. 1954)	mediatised by Hesse-Darmstadt in 1806
Esterházy de Galántha	Prince	Austria, Bavaria	Anton, 13^{th} Prince (b. 1936)	Obtained princely county of Edelstetten in 1804. Mediatised to Bavaria in 1806. Held mediate to Austria several minor territories. Held mediate in Baden the lordship of Gallingen, but not predicated as mediatised
Fugger-Babenhausen	Prince	Austria, Bavaria	Hubertus, 8^{th} Prince (b. 1946)	Exempted under Bavaria 1806, weeks before the formation of the Confederation of the Rhine
Fugger-Glött	Prince; Count before 1913	Bavaria	Extinct	Exempted under Bavaria 1806, weeks before the formation of the Confederation of the Rhine. Extinct in 1981.
Fürstenberg	Prince	Austria, Baden, Hohenzollern-Sigmaringen, Württemberg	Heinrich, 12^{th} Prince (b. 1950)	Mostly mediatised by Baden in 1806. Lordship of Trochtelfingen, mediatised by Hohenzollern-Sigmaringen in 1806. Lordships of Gundelfingen and Neufra, mediatised by Württemberg in 1806
Hohenlohe-Neuenstein-Oehringen	Prince	Austria, Württemberg	Kraft, 9^{th} Prince (Also 5^{th} Duke of Ujest, b. 1933)	mediatised by Württemberg in 1806
Hohenlohe-Jagstberg	Prince	Austria, Württemberg	Alexander, 2^{nd} Prince (b. 1937)	mediatised by Württemberg in 1806
Hohenlohe-Waldenburg-Schillingsfürst	Prince	Austria, Württemberg	Felix, 10^{th} Prince (b. 1963)	mediatised by Württemberg in 1806
Hohenlohe-Neuenstein-Langenburg	Prince	Austria, Württemberg	Philipp, 10^{th} Prince (b. 1970)	mediatised by Württemberg in 1806
Hohenlohe-Waldenburg-Bartenstein	Prince	Austria, Württemberg	Ferdinand, 10^{th} Prince (b. 1942)	mediatised by Württemberg in 1806
Hohenlohe-Schillingsfürst	Prince	Austria, Bavaria, Württemberg	Constantin, 12^{th} Prince (b. 1949)	mediatised by Bavaria in 1806
Hohenlohe-Schillingsfürst (Ratibor and Corvey branch)	Prince	Austria, Bavaria, Württemberg	Viktor, 5^{th} Duke of Ratibor and 5^{th} Prince of Corvey (b. 1964)	mediatised by Bavaria in 1806
Kaunitz-Rietberg	Prince	Austria, Prussia	Extinct	mediatised by Westphalia in 1807. Extinct in 1848
Khevenhüller-Metsch	Prince	Austria	Bartolomäus, 11^{th} Prince (b. 1958)	Held mediate to Austria several minor territories
Leiningen	Prince	Austria, Baden, Bavaria, Hesse-Darmstadt	Andreas, 8^{th} Prince (b. 1956)	mediatised by Baden in 1806
Leyen	Prince	Austria, Baden	Philipp Erwein, 7^{th} Prince (b. 1967)	Became a principality in 1806. Mediatised by Austria in 1815. Ceded to Baden in 1819
Lobkowicz	Prince	Austria	Jaroslav, 14^{th} Prince (b. 1942)	Princely county of Störnstein mediatised by Bavaria in 1807 and the rights to this territory sold to it in 1814. Held mediate to Austria the duchy of Raudnitz and several minor territories
Löwenstein-Wertheim-Freudenberg	Prince	Baden, Bavaria, Württemberg	Ludwig, 8^{th} Prince (b. 1951)	County of Virneburg annexed by France and ceded by the Empire in the Treaty of Campo Formio, in 1797. Mediatised by Baden, Prince-Primate and Württemberg in 1806
Löwenstein-Wertheim-Rosenberg	Prince	Austria, Baden, Bavaria, Hesse-Darmstadt, Württemberg	Alois-Constantin, 9^{th} Prince (b. 1941)	mediatised by Baden, Hesse-Darmstadt, Prince-Primate and Württemberg in 1806
Looz-Corswarem	Duke	Austria, Hanover, Prussia	Thierry, 11^{th} Duke (b. 1948)	The territories of Looz-Corswarem were annexed by France and ceded by the Empire in the Treaty of Campo Formio in 1797. Received the Principality of Rheina-Wolbeck in 1803. Mediatised by the Grand Duchy of Berg in 1806. The principality was divided in 1815 between the Kingdom of Prussia and the Kingdom of Hanover.
Metternich-Winneburg	Prince	Austria	Extinct	Lordship of Winneburg and Beilstein annexed by France and ceded by the Empire in the Treaty of Campo Formio in 1797. Received the county of Ochsenhausen in 1803. Mediatised by Württemberg in 1806, and rights to this territory sold to it in 1825. Held mediate to Austria the county of Köningswart and several minor territories. Extinct in 1992
Orsini and Rosenberg	Prince	Austria	Johannes, 7^{th} Prince (b. 1949)	Held mediate to Austria several minor territories
Öttingen-Spielberg	Prince	Austria, Bavaria, Württemberg	Franz Albrecht, 11^{th} Prince (b. 1982)	mediatised by Bavaria in 1806
Öttingen-Wallerstein	Prince	Austria, Bavaria, Württemberg	Moritz, 8^{th} Prince (b. 1946)	mediatised by Bavaria in 1806
Quadt-Wykradt and Isny	Prince; Count before 1901	Württemberg	Alexander, 5^{th} Prince (b. 1958)	Lordship of Wickrath annexed by France and ceded by the Empire in the Treaty of Campo Formio, in 1797. Received the county of Isny in 1803. Mediatised by Württemberg in 1806
Salm-Kyrburg	Prince	Austria, Prussia	Extinct	The territories of Salm-Kyrburg were annexed by France and ceded by the Empire in the Treaty of Campo Formio, in 1797. Received part of the Bishopric of Münster in 1803. Mediatised the lordship of Gemen (held by Boyneburg-Bömelberg) in 1806. Annexed by France in 1810. Not restored by the Congress of Vienna. Extinct in 1905
Salm-Horstmar	Prince; Count before 1817	Austria, Prussia	Philipp Otto, 5^{th} Prince (b. 1938)	Formerly the county of Salm-Grumbach. Mediatised by Berg in 1806
Salm-Reifferscheid-Dyck	Prince; Count before 1816	Austria, Baden, Prussia	Extinct	Lordships of Dyck and Reifferscheid were annexed by France and ceded by the Empire in the Treaty of Campo Formio, in 1797. Received lordship of Baindt in 1803. Mediatised to Württemberg in 1806. Extinct in 1888
Salm-Reifferscheid-Krautheim	Prince; Count before 1804	Austria, Baden	Extinct	Lordships of Dyck and Reifferscheid were annexed by France and ceded by the Empire in the Treaty of Campo Formio, in 1797. In 1806, the territory south of the Jagst was mediatised by Württemberg; the territory north by Baden and the rights to this territory sold to them in 1829/37. Extinct in 1958
Salm-Reifferscheid-Raitz	Prince	Austria	Hugo, 7^{th} Prince (b. 1973)	Held mediate to Austria several minor territories
Salm-Salm	Prince	Austria, Prussia	Carl-Philipp, 9^{th} Prince (b. 1933)	The territories of Salm-Salm were annexed by France and ceded by the Empire in the Treaty of Campo Formio, in 1797. Received part of the Bishopric of Münster in 1803. Annexed by France in 1810. Not restored by the Congress of Vienna
Sayn-Wittgenstein-Berleburg	Prince	Austria, Prussia	Gustav, 7^{th} Prince (b. 1969)	mediatised by Hesse-Darmstadt in 1806. Ceded to Prussia in 1815
Sayn-Wittgenstein-Hohenstein	Prince	Austria, Prussia, Württemberg	Bernhart, 6^{th} Prince (b. 1963)	County of Hohnstein exempt to Prussia from 1714, annexed by Westphalia in 1806, returned to Prussia in 1813. Mediatised by Hesse-Darmstadt in 1806. Ceded to Prussia in 1815
Schönburg-Hartenstein	Prince	Austria, Saxony	Alexander, 8^{th} Prince (b. 1930)	Exempt to Saxony from 1740
Schönburg-Waldenburg	Prince	Austria, Saxony	Ulrich, 6^{th} Prince (b. 1940)	Exempt to Saxony from 1740
Schwarzenberg	Prince	Austria, Bavaria, Württemberg	Johann, 13^{th} Prince (b. 1967)^{[2]}	Principality of Schwarzenberg and barony of Seinsheim mediatised by Bavaria in 1806. Landgraviate of Klettgau mediatised by Baden in 1806. The county of Sulz mediatised by Württemberg in 1806. Held mediate to Austria the duchy of Krumau and several minor territories
Solms-Baruth	Prince; Count before 1888	Saxony	Friedrich, 5^{th} Prince (b. 1963)	mediatised by the Kingdom of Prussia in 1815.
Solms-Braunfels	Prince	Austria, Hesse-Darmstadt, Prussia, Württemberg	Extinct	mediatised by Nassau-Usingen and Nassau-Weilburg in 1806. Ceded to Prussia in 1813. Extinct in 1970
Solms-Hohensolms-Lich	Prince	Austria, Hesse-Darmstadt, Prussia, Württemberg	Carl-Christian, 9^{th} Prince (b. 1975)	mediatised by Nassau-Usingen and Nassau-Weilburg in 1806. Ceded to Prussia in 1813
Starhemberg	Prince	Austria	Georg Adam, 6^{th} Prince (b. 1961)	Held mediate to Austria several minor territories
Stolberg-Rossla	Prince; Count before 1893	Hesse-Darmstadt, Prussia	Alexander of Stolberg-Rossla (b. 1967)	Exempt to Prussia in 1714
Stolberg-Stolberg	Prince; Count before 1893	Hanover, Prussia	Jost-Christian, 4^{th} Prince (b. 1940)	Exempt to Saxony in 1738. Ceded to Prussia in 1815
Stolberg-Wernigerode	Prince; Count before 1890	Hesse-Darmstadt, Hanover, Prussia	Philipp, 5^{th} Prince (b. 1967)	Exempt to Saxony in 1738. Ceded to Prussia in 1815
Thurn and Taxis	Prince	Austria, Bavaria, Hohenzollern-Sigmaringen, Württemberg	Albert, 12^{th} Prince (b. 1983)	mediatised to Bavaria, Hohenzollern-Sigmaringen and Württemberg in 1806
Trauttmansdorff-Weinsberg	Prince	Austria	Carl-Wolfgang, 7^{th} Prince (b. 1965)	County of Umpfenbach mediatised by Baden in 1806, and rights to this territory sold to it in 1812. Held mediate to Austria several minor territories
Waldburg-Wolfegg-Waldsee	Prince	Austria, Württemberg	Johannes, 6^{th} Prince (b. 1957)	mediatised by Württemberg in 1806
Waldburg-Zeil-Trauchburg	Prince	Austria, Bavaria, Württemberg	Erich, 8^{th} Prince (b. 1962)	mediatised by Württemberg in 1806; Lordship of Alt-Trauchburg by Bavaria in 1806
Waldburg-Zeil-Wurzach	Prince	Austria, Bavaria, Württemberg	Extinct	mediatised by Württemberg in 1806; Lordship of Marstetten east of the Iller (Ferthofen) by Bavaria in 1806. Extinct in 1903
Wied-Neuwied	Prince	Austria, Nassau, Prussia	Maximilian, 9^{th} Prince (b. 1999)	Lordship of Runkel east of the Lahn mediatised by Berg in 1806; the rest mediatised by Nassau in 1806
Windisch-Grätz	Prince	Austria, Württemberg	Anton, 5^{th} Prince (b. 1942 [Elder line, last male heir]. Mariano Hugo, 6^{th} Prince (b. 1955) [Younger line]	Lordship of Eglofs mediatised by Württemberg in 1806. Held mediate to Austria several minor territories
Ysenburg and Büdingen	Prince	Austria, Hesse-Cassel, Hesse-Darmstadt	Alexander, 7^{th} Prince (b. 1969)	Formerly the principality of Isenburg-Birstein. Mediatised by Hesse-Cassel and Hesse-Darmstadt in 1815
Ysenburg and Büdingen in Büdingen	Prince; Count before 1840	Hesse-Cassel, Hesse-Darmstadt	Extinct	Formerly the county of Isenburg-Büdingen. Mediatised by Isenburg-Birstein in 1806. Extinct in 1941
Ysenburg and Büdingen in Wächtersbach	Prince; Count before 1865	Hesse-Cassel, Hesse-Darmstadt	Wolfgang-Ernst, 8^{th} Prince (b. 1936)	Formerly the county of Isenburg-Wächtersbach. Mediatised by Isenburg-Birstein in 1806

== List of Comital mediatised houses (Erlaucht) ==
Name	Title	Listed by	Head of house (as of July 2018)	Notes
Bentinck	Count	Oldenburg	Timothy, 8^{th} Count (Also 12^{th} Earl of Portland, b. 1953)	Mediatised by Oldenburg in 1807. Obtained Erlaucht recognition in 1845
Bentheim-Tecklenburg-Rheda	Count	Prussia	Christian Moritz Casimir (b. 1958)	Mediatised by Grand Duchy of Berg in 1808. Awarded to Prussia in 1815
Erbach-Erbach	Count	Bavaria, Hesse-Darmstadt, Württemberg	Franz, 8^{th} Count (b. 1958)	Mediatised by Hesse-Darmstadt in 1806
Erbach-Fürstenau	Count	Hesse-Darmstadt	Louis, 7^{th} Count (b. 1976)	Mediatised by Hesse-Darmstadt in 1806
Fugger-Kirchberg-Weissenhorn	Count	Bavaria	Extinct	Exempted under Bavaria 1806, weeks before the formation of the Confederation of the Rhine
Fugger-Kirchheim	Count	Bavaria	Extinct	Exempted under Bavaria 1806, weeks before the formation of the Confederation of the Rhine
Fugger-Nordendorf	Count	Bavaria	Extinct	Exempted under Bavaria 1806, weeks before the formation of the Confederation of the Rhine
Giech	Count	Bavaria	Extinct	Inherited half of the Imperial Lordship of Sulzbürg-Pyrbaum from Wolfstein family in 1740. Exempt to Prussia in 1791. Annexed by Bavaria in 1806. Extinct in 1938
Harrach zu Rohrau und Thannhausen	Count	Austria	Ernst Georg, 12^{th} Count (b. 1951)	Held mediate to Austria several minor territories. Obtained Erlaucht recognition in 1841. An Austrian, the immediate line went extinct in 1886
Königsegg-Aulendorf	Count	Württemberg	Maximilian, 13^{th} Count (b. 1958)	Mediatised by Württemberg in 1806
Kuefstein-Greillenstein	Count	Austria	Johann, Count of Kuefstein (b. 1951)	Held mediate to Austria several minor territories
Leiningen-Billigheim	Count	Baden	Extinct	Formerly the county of Leiningen-Guntersblum. Annexed by France and ceded by the Empire in the Treaty of Campo Formio, in 1797. Received the lordship of Billigheim in 1803. Mediatised by Baden in 1806
Leiningen-Neudenau	Count	Baden	Extinct	Formerly the county of Leiningen-Heidesheim. Annexed by France and ceded by the Empire in the Treaty of Campo Formio, in 1797. Received the lordship of Neudenau in 1803. Mediatised by Baden in 1806
Leiningen-Westerburg-Altleiningen	Count	Hesse-Darmstadt	Extinct	Received the lordship of Ilbenstadt in 1803. Mediatised by Hesse-Darmstadt in 1806
Leiningen-Westerburg-Neuleiningen	Count	Nassau	Extinct	Received the lordship of Engelthal in 1803. Mediatised by Berg in 1807. Ceded to Nassau in 1815
Neipperg	Count	Württemberg	Karl Eugen, 7^{th} Count (b. 1951)	Mediatised by Württemberg in 1806
Ortenburg-Tambach	Count	Bavaria	Heinrich, 36^{th} Count (b. 1956)	Mediatised by Bavaria in 1806
Pappenheim	Count	Bavaria	Albert, Count of Pappenheim (b. 1943)	Mediatised by Bavaria in 1806. Was not originally a member of the Imperial Diet; but recognised as a mediatised house in 1831 following a petition by the Kingdom of Bavaria, based on their partial sovereignty of the Saar department during the First French Empire
Platen-Hallermund	Count	Hanover	Erik, 5^{th} Count (b. 1939)	Mediatised by Westphalia in 1807. Ceded to Hanover in 1813
Pückler and Limpurg	Count	Württemberg	Extinct	Mediatised by Württemberg in 1806. Extinct in 1963
Rechberg and Rothenlöwen	Count	Württemberg	Bernhard, 7^{th} Count (b. 1956)	Mediatised by Württemberg in 1806. It was not a member of the Imperial Diet; recognised by Württemberg as a mediatised house
Rechteren-Limpurg	Count	Bavaria	Adolph, 9^{th} Count (b. 1931)	Mediatised by Bavaria in 1806
Schaesberg-Tannheim	Count	Württemberg	Johannes, 7^{th} Count (b. 1960)	County of Kerpen and Lommersum annexed by France and ceded by the Empire in the Treaty of Campo Formio, in 1797. Received the lordship of Tannheim in 1803. Mediatised by Württemberg in 1806
Schlitz genannt von Görtz	Count	Hesse-Darmstadt	Rüdiger, 7^{th} Count (b. 1939, the last male heir)	Mediatised by Hesse-Darmstadt in 1806
Schönborn-Buchheim	Count	Austria, Bavaria	Friedrich Karl, 7^{th} Count (b. 1938)	mediatised by Bavaria in 1806. Held mediate to Austria several minor territories
Schönborn-Wiesentheid	Count	Bavaria	Paul, 8^{th} Count (b. 1964)	Mediatised by Bavaria in 1806
Schönburg-Forderglauchau	Count	Saxony	Alexander, 6^{th} Count (b. 1969)	Exempt to Saxony from 1740
Schönburg-Hinterglauchau	Count	Saxony	Extinct	Exempt to Saxony from 1740
Schönburg-Rochsburg	Count	Saxony	Extinct	Exempt to Saxony from 1740
Schönburg-Wechselburg	Count	Saxony	Extinct	Exempt to Saxony from 1740
Solms-Laubach	Count	Hesse-Darmstadt	Karl, 11^{th} Count (b. 1963)	Mediatised by Hesse-Darmstadt in 1806
Solms-Rödelheim-Assenheim	Count	Hesse-Cassel, Hesse-Darmstadt	Philipp, Count of Solms-Rödelheim and Assenheim (b. 1964)	Mediatised by Hesse-Darmstadt in 1806
Solms-Wildenfels	Count	Hesse-Darmstadt	Friedrich Magnus, Count of Solms-Wildenfels (b. 1927)	Mediatised by Hesse-Darmstadt in 1806
Stadion-Thannhausen	Count	Bavaria	Extinct	Mediatised by Bavaria in 1806. Extinct in 1908
Stadion-Warthausen	Count	Austria, Württemberg	Extinct	Mediatised by Bavaria in 1806. It was not a member of the Imperial Diet; recognised by Austria and Württemberg as a mediatised house. Extinct in 1906
Sternberg-Manderscheid	Count	Austria, Württemberg	Extinct	Counties of: Blankenheim, Gerolstein, Kayl and Manderscheid annexed by France and ceded by the Empire in the Treaty of Campo Formio, in 1797. Received the counties of Schussenried and Weissenau in 1803. Mediatised by Württemberg in 1806. Extinct in 1830
Törring-Gutenzell	Count	Württemberg	Hans Veit, 4^{th} Count (b. 1935)	County of Gronsfeld annexed by France and ceded by the Empire in the Treaty of Campo Formio, in 1797. Received the county of Gutenzell in 1803. Mediatised by Württemberg in 1806. Extinct in 1860; collateral branch given mediatised rights in 1888
Waldbott von Bassenheim	Count	Bavaria, Nassau, Württemberg	Carl Ludwig, 8^{th} Count (b. 1938, the last male heir)	County of Pyrmont annexed by France and ceded by the Empire in the Treaty of Campo Formio, in 1797. The county of Heggbach was received in 1803. Mediatised by Bavaria in 1806. Inherited Buxheim in 1809
Waldburg-Zeil-Hohenems	Count	Austria, Bavaria	Franz Josef, Count of Waldburg-Zeil-Hohenems (b. 1962)	Imperial County of Lustenau was mediatised by Bavaria in 1806; it became part of Austria in 1830.
Waldeck-Bergheim	Count	Württemberg	Extinct	Waldeck-Limpurg mediatised by Württemberg in 1806
Wallmoden-Gimborn	Count	Mecklenburg	Extinct	Lordship of Gimborn-Neustadt mediatised by Berg in 1807
Wurmbrand-Stuppach	Count	Austria	Ernst Gundaccar, 5^{th} Count (b. 1946)	Held mediate to Austria several minor territories
Ysenburg and Büdingen in Meerholz	Count	Hesse-Cassel, Hesse-Darmstadt, Württemberg	Extinct	Formerly the county of Isenburg-Meerholz. Mostly mediatised by Isenburg-Birstein in 1806. 1/4 portion of the Solms-Assenheim & part of Limpurg-Gaildorf meditised to Württemberg in 1806. Extinct in 1939
Ysenburg and Büdingen in Philippseich	Count	Hesse-Darmstadt	Extinct	Appanage branch of the princely line of Isenburg-Birstein. Recognised by Hesse-Darmstadt as a mediatised house, despite not possessing immediacy or a vote in the Imperial Diet

== List of Houses not considered as part of the mediatised houses ==
Listed below are houses that were not counted amongst the mediatised houses for one reason or another. Usually this is because

- they became extinct before the formalisation of the mediatised houses in 1825/9,
- they divested their immediate territories just before the German mediatisation in 1806, or
- they surrendered their mediate rights before 1825/9.

The formal list of the mediatised Houses generally does not include the families of imperial immediacy bearers belonging to old Imperial States outside the German Confederation (France, Italy, Belgium, Netherlands).

Name	Title	Notes
Abensperg und Traun	Count	Eglofs sold to Windisch-Grätz in 1804
Anhalt-Bernburg-Schaumburg-Hoym	Prince	Mediatised by Nassau in 1806. Extinct 1812
Aspremont-Lynden	Count	Rekem (Reckheim) annexed by France and ceded by the Empire in the Treaty of Campo Formio, in 1797. Received the county of Baindt in 1803. Mediatised by Württemberg in 1806. Sold in 1812
Boyneburg-Bömelberg	Baron	Inherited the immediate lordship of Gemen in 1800, after extinction of the Limburg-Styrum-Gemen branch. Unclear however if the Imperial Diet vote associated to Gemen was also inherited (some state that it was transferred to the only surviving Limburg-Styrum branch, that of Styrum). Mediatised by Berg in 1806. Extinct in 1826/31
Heydeck-Bretzenheim	Prince	The lands of Bretzenheim were annexed by France and ceded by the Empire in the Treaty of Campo Formio, in 1797. Received the principality of Lindau in 1803. Ceded to Austria in 1804. Extinct in 1863
Grävenitz	Count	Imperial Lordship of Welzheim was forcefully sold in 1735 by the Grävenitz family for 65,000 Gulden to Württemberg. Descendants of the last ruler, Count Friedrich Wilhelm von Grävenitz (1679-1754), who later unsuccessfully tried to reclaim its rights, went extinct.
Gudenus		Since 1774, the family ruled the Lordship of Umpfenbach, which held Imperial Immediacy, but sold it in 1805 to the Trauttmansdorff family.
Ligne	Prince	Compensation for loss of the Imperial County of Ligne (Fagnolles, since that barony had become seat of the county in 1789), as a result of the Peace of Lunéville, consisted of substitution of the secularized Imperial abbey of Edelstetten, with an individual vote guaranteed in the Imperial College of Princes in 1803. That principality was, however, sold to Prince Nikolaus Esterházy on 22 May 1804, before the abolition of the Holy Roman Empire, of which Edelstetten had been a constituent Imperial state, in 1806.
Limburg-Styrum	Count	Imperial Diet vote lost in 1800 (Gemen), but still possessed the immediate lordship of Styrum, which was mediatised in 1806 and which is formally cited in the Treaty of the Confederation of the Rhine. Nevertheless, Limburg-Styrum was not listed by any member of the German Confederation as a mediatised House in 1825, given that they had sold their German properties and left to their lands in the newly created kingdoms of the Netherlands and Belgium. The family is, however, generally counted as part of the mediatised houses.
Nesselrode	Count	Imperial lordship of Reichenstein was mediatised by Nassau in 1806. An immediate branch of the family went extinct in 1824
Nostitz-Rieneck	Count	Rieneck sold to Colloredo-Mansfeld in 1803
Ostein	Count	Myllendonk annexed by France and ceded by the Empire in the Treaty of Campo Formio, in 1797. Received the lordship of Buxheim in 1803. Mediatised by Bavaria in 1806. Extinct in 1809
Plettenberg-Mietingen	Count	Wittem annexed by France and ceded by the Empire in the Treaty of Campo Formio, in 1797. Received the lordship of Mietingen and Sulmingen in 1803. Mediatised by Württemberg in 1806. Extinct in 1813
Sickingen-Sickingen	Count	Mediatised by Württemberg in 1806. Extinct in 1834
Sinzendorf	Prince	Rheineck annexed by France and ceded by the Empire in the Treaty of Campo Formio, in 1797. Received the burgraviate of Winterrieden in 1803. Mediatised by Bavaria in 1806. Extinct in 1822
Wartenberg-Roth	Count	Their possessions on the left bank of the Rhine were annexed by France and ceded by the Empire in the Treaty of Campo Formio, in 1797. As a compensation, they received the county of Roth in 1803. Mediatised by Württemberg in 1806. The family went extinct in 1818
Wied-Runkel	Prince	Lordship of Runkel east of the Lahn mediatised by Berg in 1806; the rest mediatised by Nassau in 1806. Extinct in 1824
Wolfstein	Count	Ruled over the Imperial Lordship of Sulzbürg-Pyrbaum from 1673. Extinct in 1740. Rights to the Lordship inherited by the Houses of Hohenlohe-Kirchberg and Giech.
