= Christian Gottlob Neefe =

German composer and conductor (1748–1798)

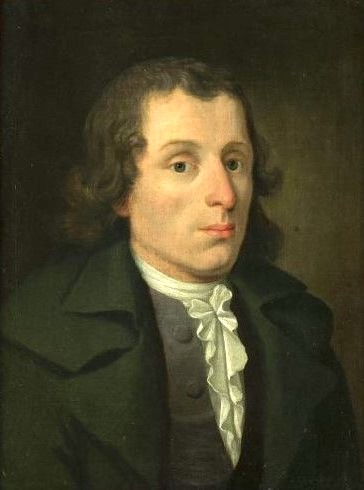
Christian Gottlob Neefe

Christian Gottlob Neefe (German: [ˈneːfə]; 5 February 1748 – 28 January 1798) was a German opera composer and conductor. He was known as one of the first teachers of Ludwig van Beethoven.

== Life and career ==
Neefe was born in Chemnitz, Saxony. He received a musical education and started to compose at the age of 12. He studied law at Leipzig University, but subsequently returned to music to become a pupil of the composer Johann Adam Hiller under whose guidance he wrote his first comic operas.

In 1776, Neefe joined the Seyler theatrical company of Abel Seyler (then) in Dresden, and inherited the position of musical director from his mentor, Hiller. He later became court organist in Bonn and was the principal piano teacher of Ludwig van Beethoven. He helped Beethoven produce some of his first works. His best known work was a Singspiel called Adelheit von Veltheim (1780). In Bonn, Neefe became prefect of the local chapter of the Illuminati, the Minervalkirche Stagira. He died in 1798 in Dessau, 8 days before his 50th birthday.

== Works ==
=== Operas ===
Title	Genre	Subdivisions	Libretto	Première date	Place, theatre
Der Dorfbarbier (with Johann Adam Hiller)	komische Operette	1 act	Christian Felix Weiße, after Michel-Jean Sedaine's Blaise le savetier	18 April 1771	Leipzig, Rannstädter Thore
Die Apotheke	komische Oper	2 acts	Johann Jacob Engel	13 December 1771	Berlin, Theater in der Behrenstrasse
Amors Guckkasten	Operette	1 act	Johann Benjamin Michaelis	10 May 1772	Leipzig
Die Einsprüche	komische Oper	1 act	Johann Benjamin Michaelis	late 1772	Leipzig, Rannstädter Thore
Zemire und Azor	komische Oper	4 acts	Moritz August von Thümmel, after Jean-François Marmontel	5 March 1776	Leipzig (Koberwein Company)
Heinrich und Lyda	Drama	1 act	Bernhard Christian d'Arien	26 March 1776	Berlin, (Döbbelin Company)
Sophonisbe	musikaliches Drama	1 act	August Gottlieb Meissner	12 October 1776	Leipzig
Die Zigeuner	Lustspiel mit gesang	5 acts	H F Möller, after Cervantes	November 1777	Frankfurt
Adelheit von Veltheim	Schauspiel mit Gesang	4 acts	Gustav Friedrich Wilhelm Großmann	23 September 1780	Frankfurt, Junghof
Der neue Gutsherr		3 acts	Johann Gottfried Dyck and Johann Friedrich Jünger, after Marivaux's Le paysan parvenu	unperformed	

=== Other works ===
- Oden von Klopstock: Serenade for piano and voice. Flensburg 1776
- Variations on the Priestermarsch aus der Zauberflöte
- Twelve piano sonatas
- Rondo in C major
