= Bartholomew Le Roux =

1663–1713, silversmith

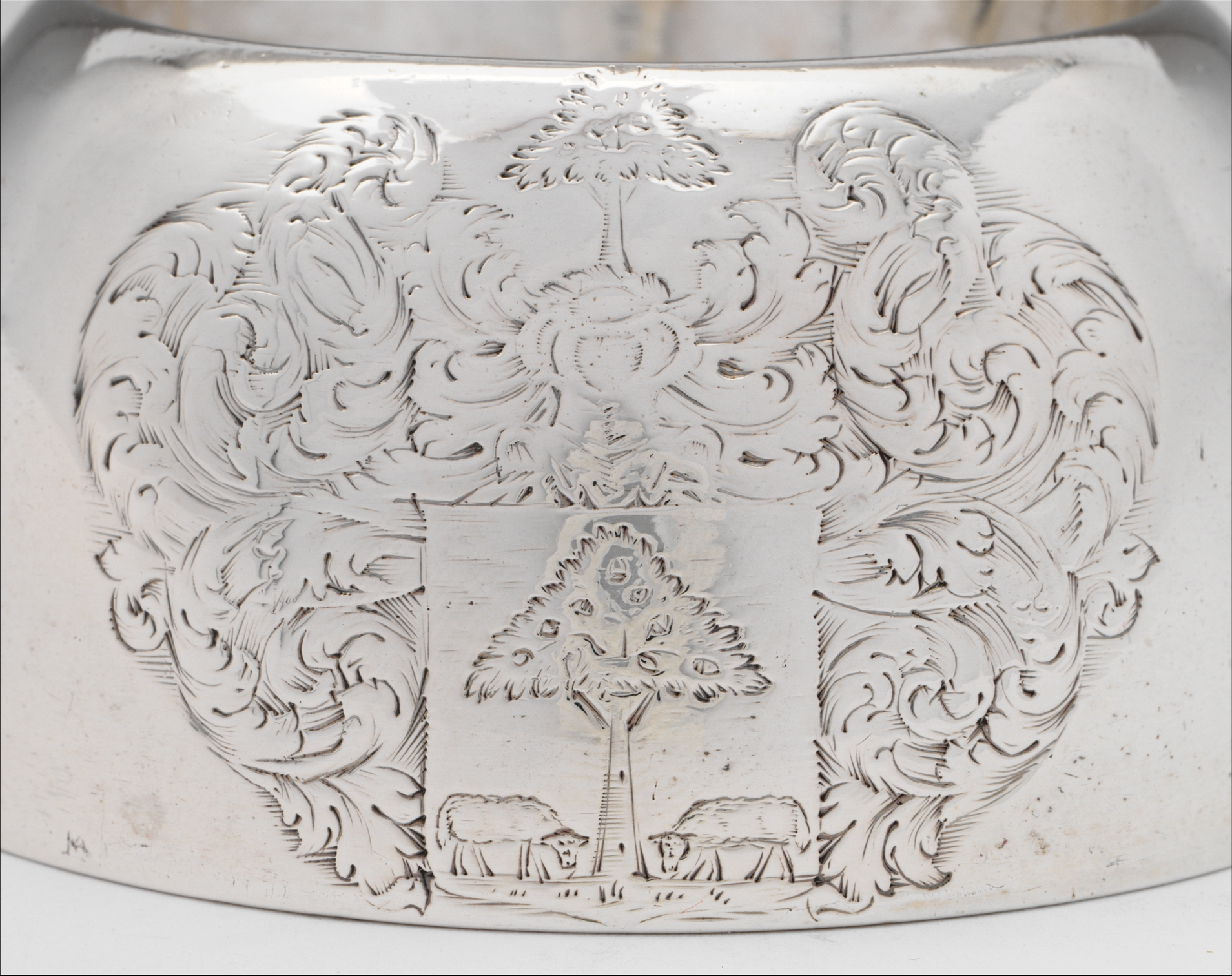
Trencher salt by Bartholomew Le Roux, between 1690 and 1710, in the Metropolitan Museum of Art

Bartholomew Le Roux (1663 – August 1713) was an silversmith from the Thirteen Colonies, active in New York City.

Le Roux was born in Amsterdam, the son of Pierre Le Roux, a goldsmith and son of Huguenot exiles. Pierre emigrated to London in 1680, became a naturalized citizen in 1682, and the family followed in 1683. Le Roux himself landed in New York City sometime before 1687, and worked thereafter as a silversmith and goldsmith in New York City, with his shop and residence on the west side of Broadway at Beaver Lane (now Morris Street). He was made a freeman on June 6, 1687, married Gertrude Van Rollegom on December 22, 1688, and served as assistant alderman from 1702 to 1712. He was master to the following apprentices: Peter Van Dyck, 1700; Charles Le Roux, circa 1702; Lucas Stoutenburg, circa 1703; and John Le Roux, circa 1708–1713. Le Roux's work is collected in the Metropolitan Museum of Art, Winterthur Museum, and Yale University Art Gallery.
