= Christopher H. van Dyck =

American psychiatrist

Christopher H. van Dyck (born 25 August 1955), is the Founder and Director of the Alzheimer's Disease Research Unit (ADRU) at Yale University School of Medicine, where he is Professor of Psychiatry, Neurology and Neuroscience. His research uses brain imaging to learn about the progression of pathology in Alzheimer's disease, and to test potential new treatments for this disease.

Van Dyck was born in Wichita, Kansas to Barbara Kroll Dyck, an elementary school teacher, and Walter Dyck, a college art professor. He has two brothers, Peter and Tim van Dyck. His family moved to Vermont in 1957, where he grew up in Johnson and Underhill. He graduated from Burlington High School, where he and his partner won the varsity state debate championship.

== Alzheimer's disease research ==
Van Dyck created the Yale Alzheimer's Research Unit in 1992, performing research on Alzheimer's disease and related cognitive disorders. He has helped to pioneer the use of SPECT and PET imaging to learn about brain alterations related to cognitive and behavioral changes in Alzheimer's Disease and the aging brain, and to test potential treatments for Alzheimer's Disease.

Using SPECT imaging of the Dopamine transporter, van Dyck's work has shown that there is loss of dopamine from the aging striatum, and that this is related to a slowing of reaction time, a measure of mental chronometry.

van Dyck uses PET imaging to track Alzheimer's-related pathology, to learn how pathology relates to ApoE genotype, and whether it is diminished by potential treatments. Dr. van Dyck has collaborated with Dr. Richard Carson at the Yale PET Center to test the new PET ligand 11C-UCB-J, which binds to SV2A to provide an assay of presynaptic axon terminals in the human brain. Studies of this ligand in early Alzheimer's Disease patients have shown a loss of synapses from the perforant path, the connections between the entorhinal cortex and hippocampal formation needed for memory consolidation.

van Dyck and the Yale ADRU have tested potential Alzheimer's therapeutics for over 20 years. They have contributed to the successful development of memantine now in use for the treatment of mid-late stage Alzheimer's Disease, and assess potential new therapeutic strategies, e.g. antibodies that reduce amyloid pathology such as Crenezumab, and based on the work of Dr. Stephen Strittmatter, an inhibitor of fyn. van Dyck is the lead author on the New England Journal of Medicine report on lecanemab, the first treatment to significantly slow the course of Alzheimer's disease.

Dr. van Dyck serves on the Steering Committees of the National Institute on Aging Alzheimer's Disease Cooperative Study (ADCS) and the Alzheimer's Disease Neuroimaging Initiative (ADNI). He serves as co-director of the Yale Alzheimer's Disease Research Center with Dr. Strittmatter, and is Director of the Division of Aging and Geriatric Psychiatry at Yale. Dr. van Dyck is the Chair of the Medical and Scientific Advisory Council of the Connecticut chapter of the Alzheimer's Association. He received the "Compassion and Cure" Award from the Alzheimer's Association in 2005.

== Chess ==
Chris was an avid Correspondence Chess player. In 1992, Chris won the International Correspondence Chess Federation title International Correspondence Chess Master, winning the 1979 Absolute. His games from this tournament have been published, including in Alex Dunne's Modern Postal Masterpieces.
