= Alexander Dück =

German ice hockey player

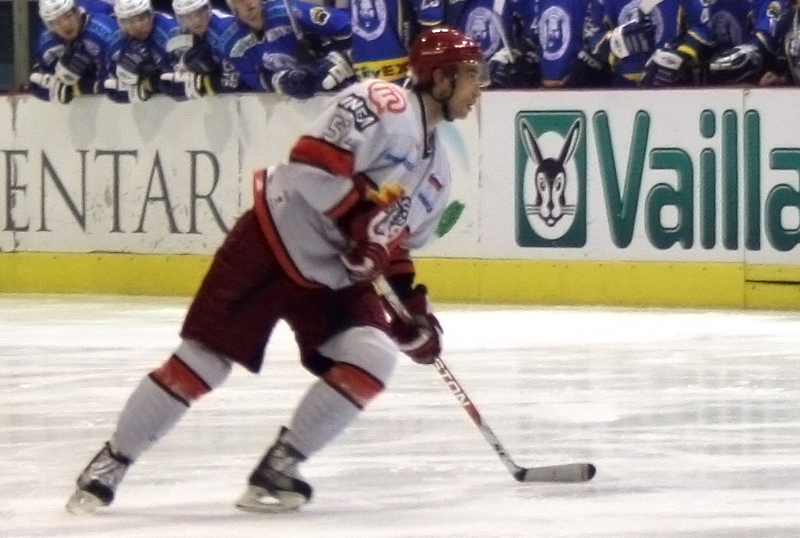
- Born: April 22, 1980 (age 45) Karaganda, Soviet Union
- Height: 6 ft 1 in (185 cm)
- Weight: 183 lb (83 kg; 13 st 1 lb)
- Position: Defence
- Shot: Left
- DEL team Former teams: Free Agent; Schwenninger Wild Wings; Krefeld Pinguine; Iserlohn Roosters; HK Acroni Jesenice; Hamburg Freezers
- Playing career: 1996–2017

Alexander Dück also spelled Dueck (born April 22, 1980) is a German former professional ice hockey defenceman. He most recently played with Ravensburg Towerstars of the DEL2. Dueck played a solitary season for the Hamburg Freezers during the 2010–11 season. He then returned to the Krefeld Pinguine for the following 2011–12 season on May 11, 2011.

Dück mirrored his previous season and totaled 5 points in 52 games with the Pinguine. A free agent at season's end, Dück made a return to his original DEL and youth club, Schwenninger Wild Wings on July 13, 2012. He competed and Captained the Wild Wings in the 2nd Bundesliga during the 2012–13 season, scoring 17 points in 48 games to help reach the finals. With Schwenninger welcomed back to the DEL for the 2013–14 season, Dueck re-signed with the club on a one-year extension on March 7, 2013.

== Career statistics ==
			Regular season					Playoffs
Season	Team	League	GP	G	A	Pts	PIM	GP	G	A	Pts	PIM
1994–95	Schwenninger ERC	Mini B	27	8	15	23	44	—	—	—	—	—
1996–97	Schwenninger ERC II	Germany3	8	1	2	3	6	—	—	—	—	—
1997–98	Schwenninger ERC II	Germany3	27	2	3	5	16	—	—	—	—	—
1998–99	SERC Wild Wings	DEL	10	0	1	1	2	—	—	—	—	—
1999–00	SERC Wild Wings	DEL	27	0	0	0	0	—	—	—	—	—
1999–00	Schwenninger ERC U20	Junioren-BL	25	13	3	16	22	—	—	—	—	—
2000–01	SERC Wild Wings	DEL	60	2	7	9	36	—	—	—	—	—
2001–02	SERC Wild Wings	DEL	60	0	1	1	38	—	—	—	—	—
2002–03	SERC Wild Wings	DEL	52	2	0	2	26	—	—	—	—	—
2003–04	Krefeld Pinguine	DEL	51	0	2	2	10	—	—	—	—	—
2004–05	Krefeld Pinguine	DEL	50	1	0	1	33	—	—	—	—	—
2005–06	Krefeld Pinguine	DEL	52	2	5	7	46	5	0	0	0	4
2006–07	Krefeld Pinguine	DEL	52	5	15	20	40	2	0	0	0	0
2007–08	Iserlohn Roosters	DEL	55	1	10	11	38	7	0	0	0	2
2008–09	Iserlohn Roosters	DEL	52	0	5	5	28	—	—	—	—	—
2009–10	HK Jesenice	EBEL	50	6	22	28	129	—	—	—	—	—
2009–10	HK Jesenice	Slovenia	4	1	2	3	2	6	2	0	2	2
2010–11	Hamburg Freezers	DEL	52	1	5	6	10	—	—	—	—	—
2011–12	Krefeld Pinguine	DEL	52	1	5	6	34	—	—	—	—	—
2012–13	SERC Wild Wings	Germany2	48	2	15	17	67	16	0	3	3	18
2013–14	Schwenninger Wild Wings	DEL	52	1	8	9	42	—	—	—	—	—
2014–15	Schwenninger Wild Wings	DEL	52	1	5	6	18	—	—	—	—	—
2015–16	Ravensburg Towerstars	DEL2	51	7	33	40	122	11	0	2	2	16
2016–17	Ravensburg Towerstars	DEL2	51	6	9	15	30	3	0	2	2	6
DEL totals			729	17	69	86	401	29	0	2	2	37
