= Albert Van Dyck =

Belgian painter (1902–1951)

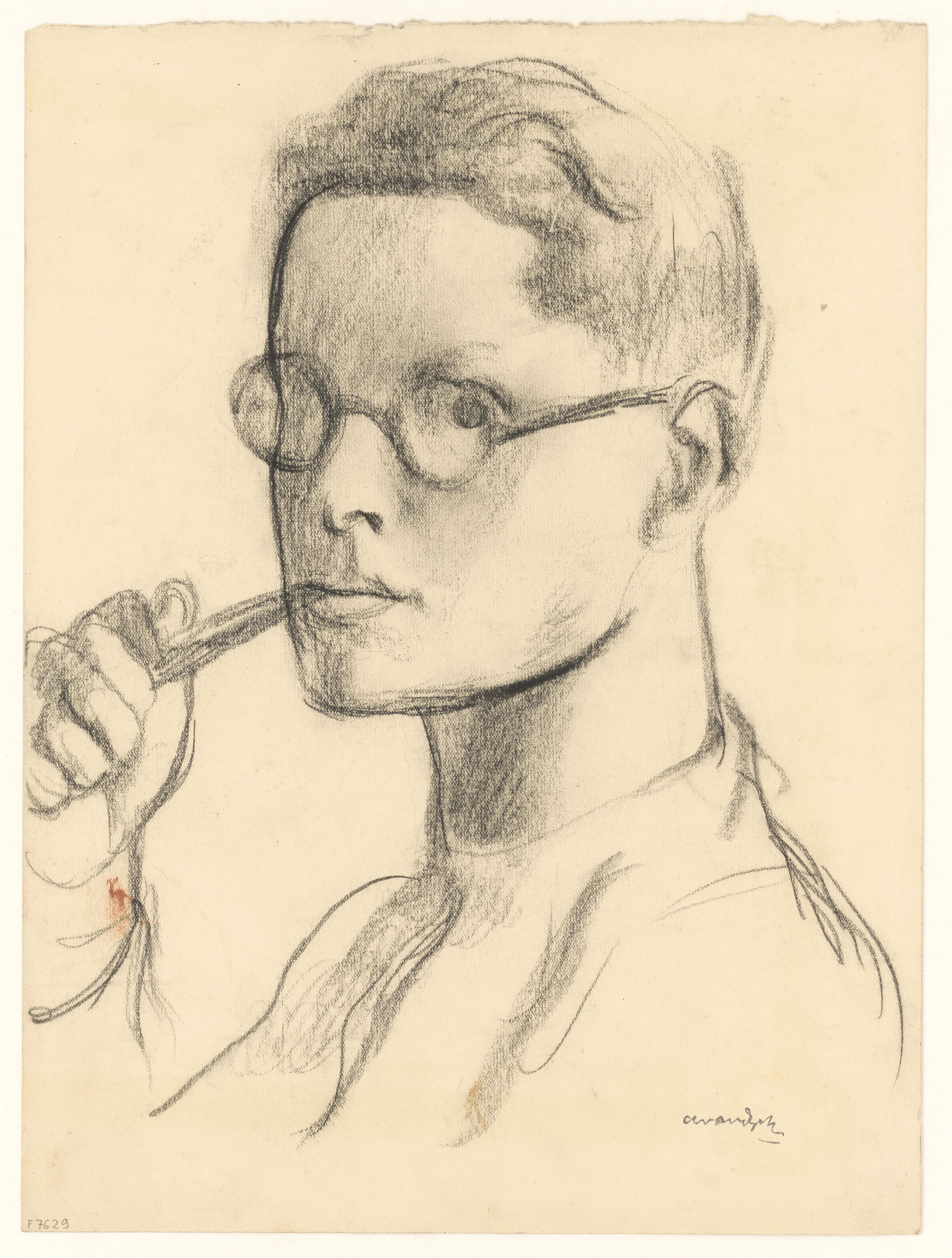
Self-portrait, drawing by Albert Van Dyck, 1929, Print cabinet of the Royal Library of Belgium, F 7629

Albert Van Dyck (25 May 1902 – 27 March 1951) was a Belgian painter. He painted genre works, figures, portraits, and still lifes. Van Dyck was also an engraver, as well as a watercolorist.

== Biography ==
Albert Van Dyck was born in Turnhout, Antwerp Province, on 25 May 1902. When Van Dyck started out as an artist, Vlaamse expressionisme, Flemish expressionism, had become the authoritative art movement in the Flemish art world through the Latem Schools. Initially, Van Dyck evolved, via a luminist style, into a purely pictorial painting style, in which he paid particular attention to the figures of children and to the Campine landscape, especially the surroundings of Kasterlee and Schilde, where he had moved. He and other Flemish artists, such as War Van Overstraeten, also reacted to the evolution of expressionism, which they perceived as excessive. Their art has been described as Animisme by critics.

In his artistic training, Albert Van Dyck studied at the Academy of Fine Arts and at the Institut Supérieur in Antwerp, under teachers Isidoor Opsomer, Albert Ciamberlani and Jules De Bruycker. In 1932 he founded his own free Academy in Antwerp. He had, among others, Jan Vaerten as a pupil. In 1949 he became a professor of drawing at the Higher Institute (Institut Supérieur) in that city, where he himself had studied.

The Albert Van Dyck Museum was opened in Schilde on 4 October 1997. The museum holds 298 works by Van Dyck on loan from the Flemish Community.

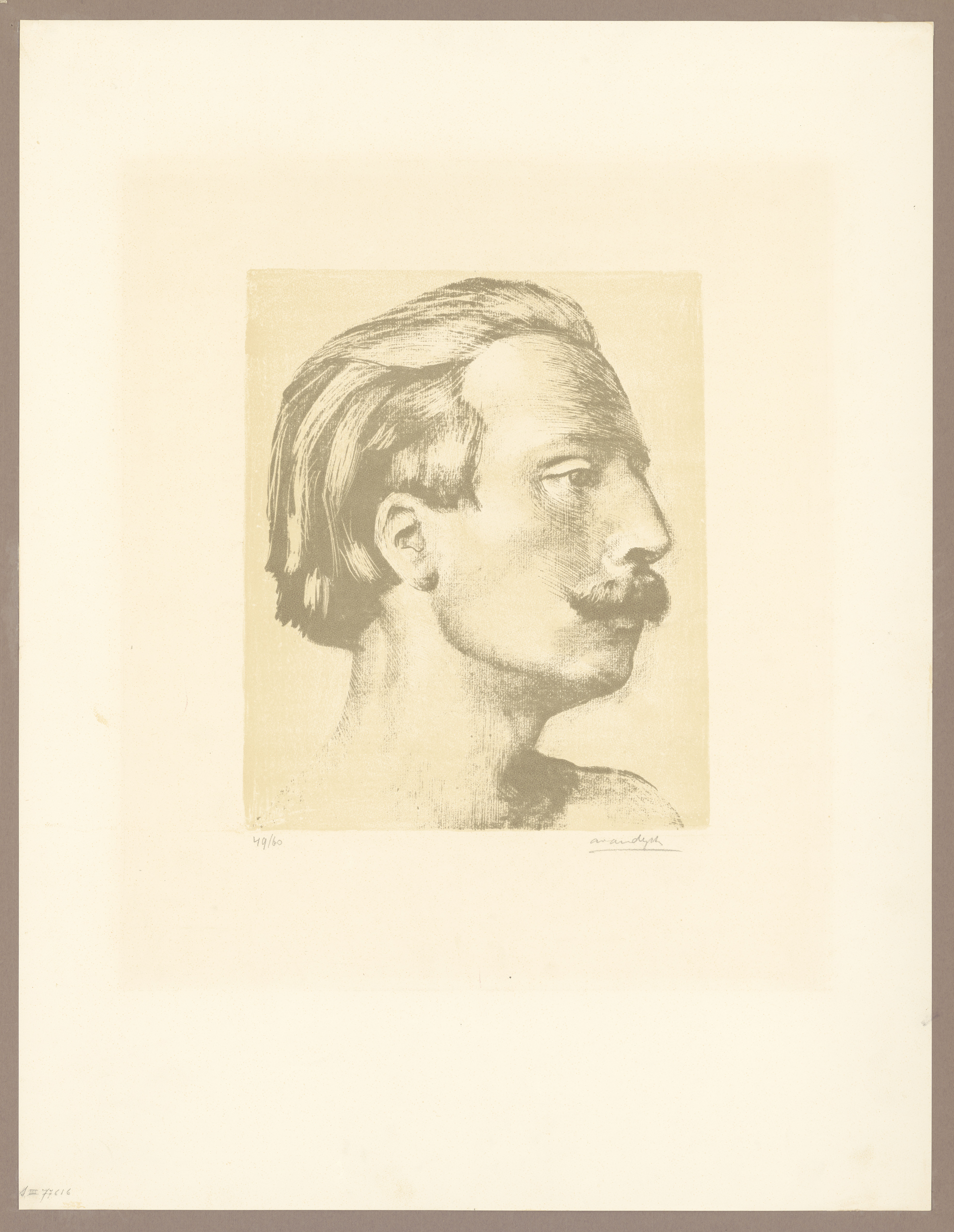
Charles De Coster, print by Albert Van Dyck, 1927, Print cabinet of the Royal Library of Belgium, S.III 77616

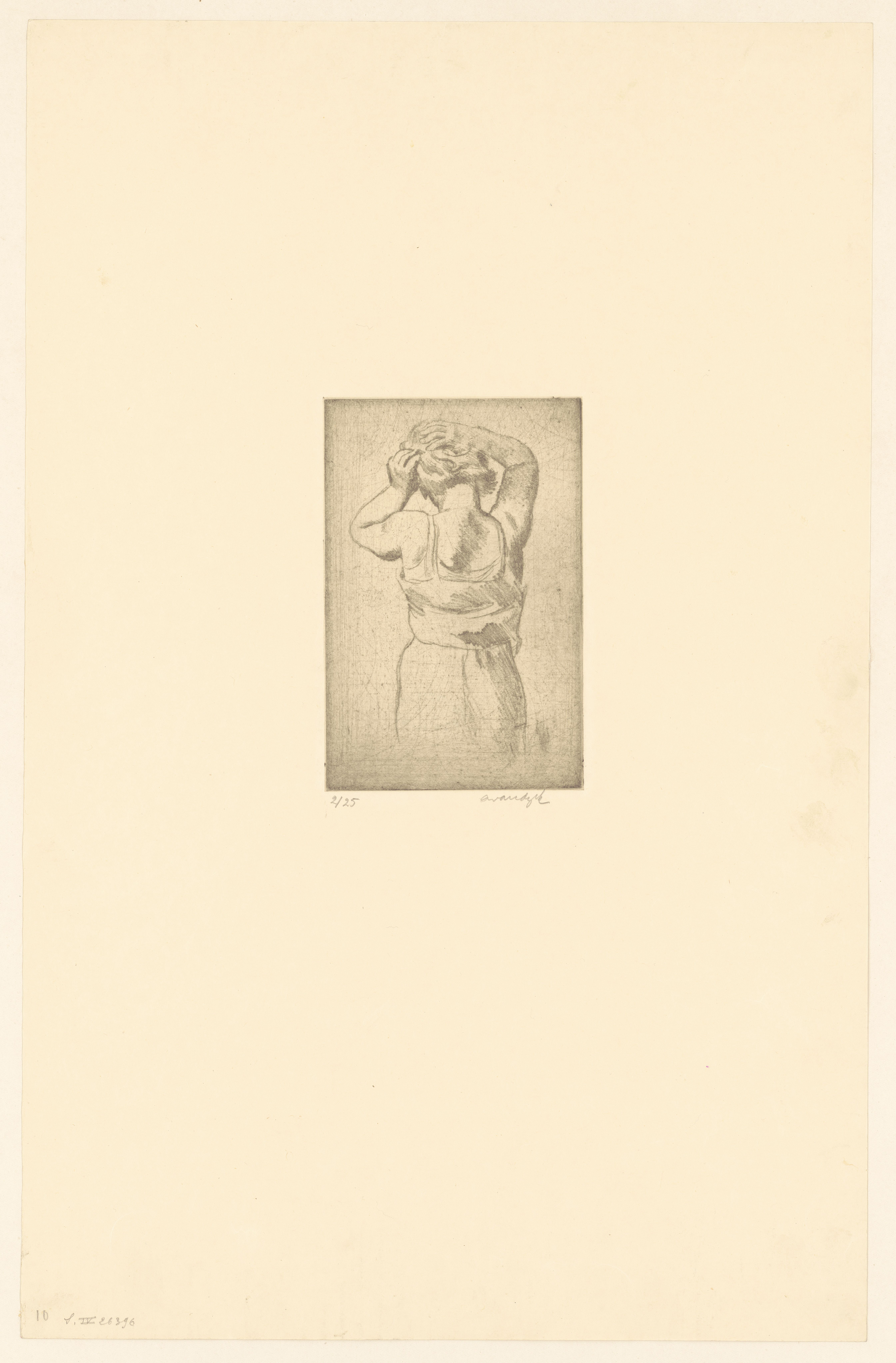
Woman doing her hair, print by Albert Van Dyck, s.d., Print cabinet of the Royal Library of Belgium, S.IV 26396

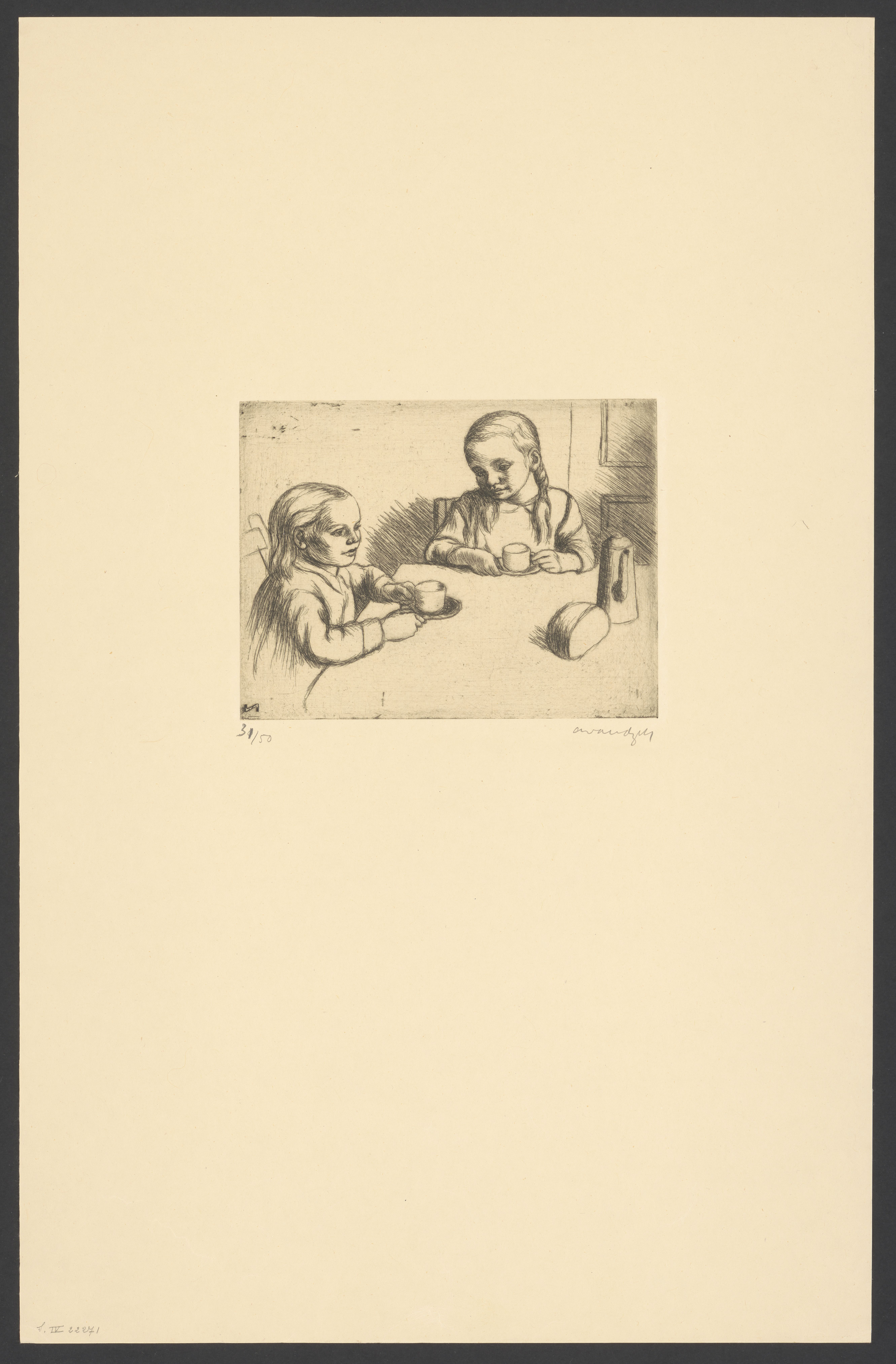
Children at breakfast, print by Albert Van Dyck, 1935, Print cabinet of the Royal Library of Belgium, S.IV 22271

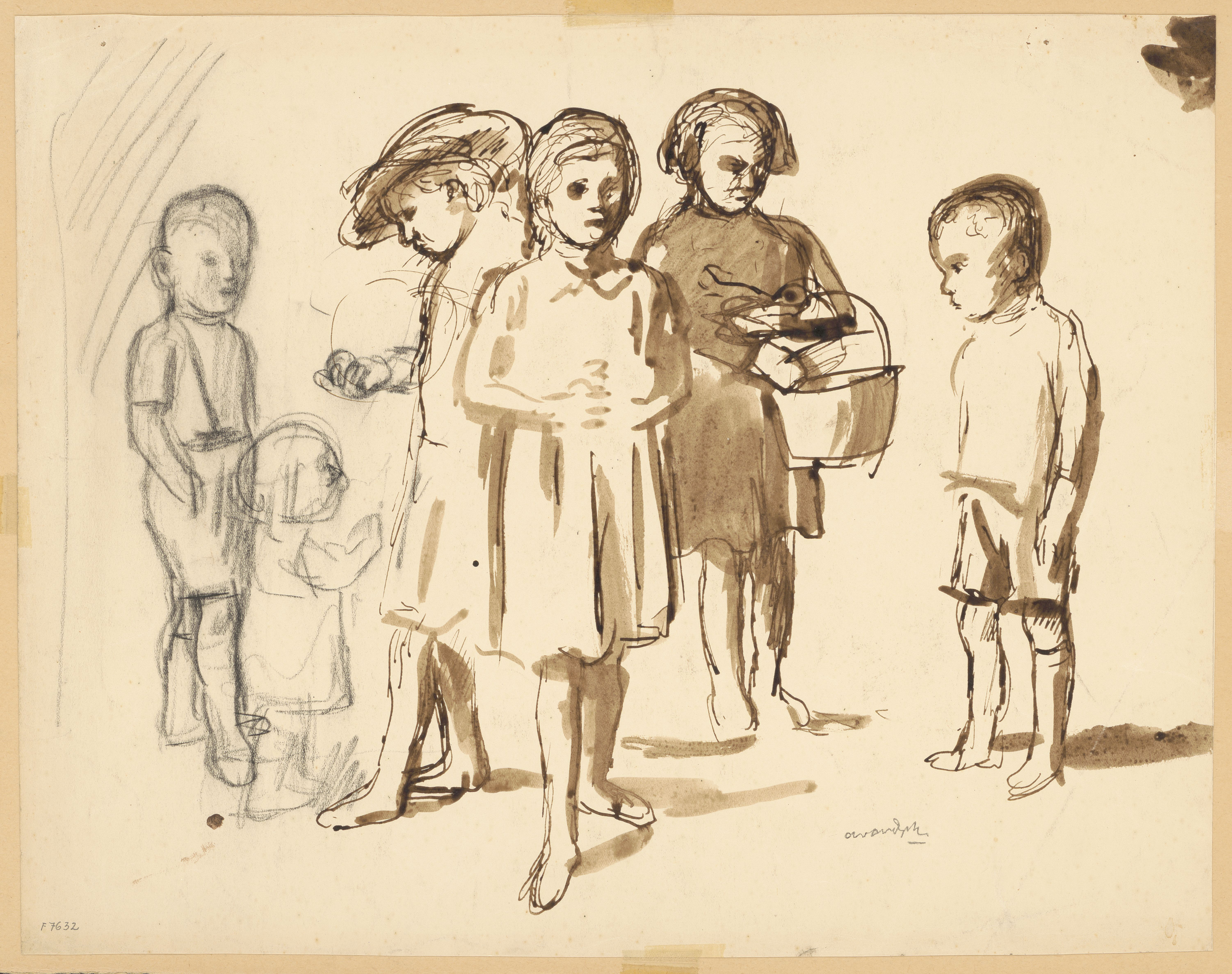
Group of children, drawing by Albert Van Dyck, s.d., Print cabinet of the Royal Library of Belgium, F 7632

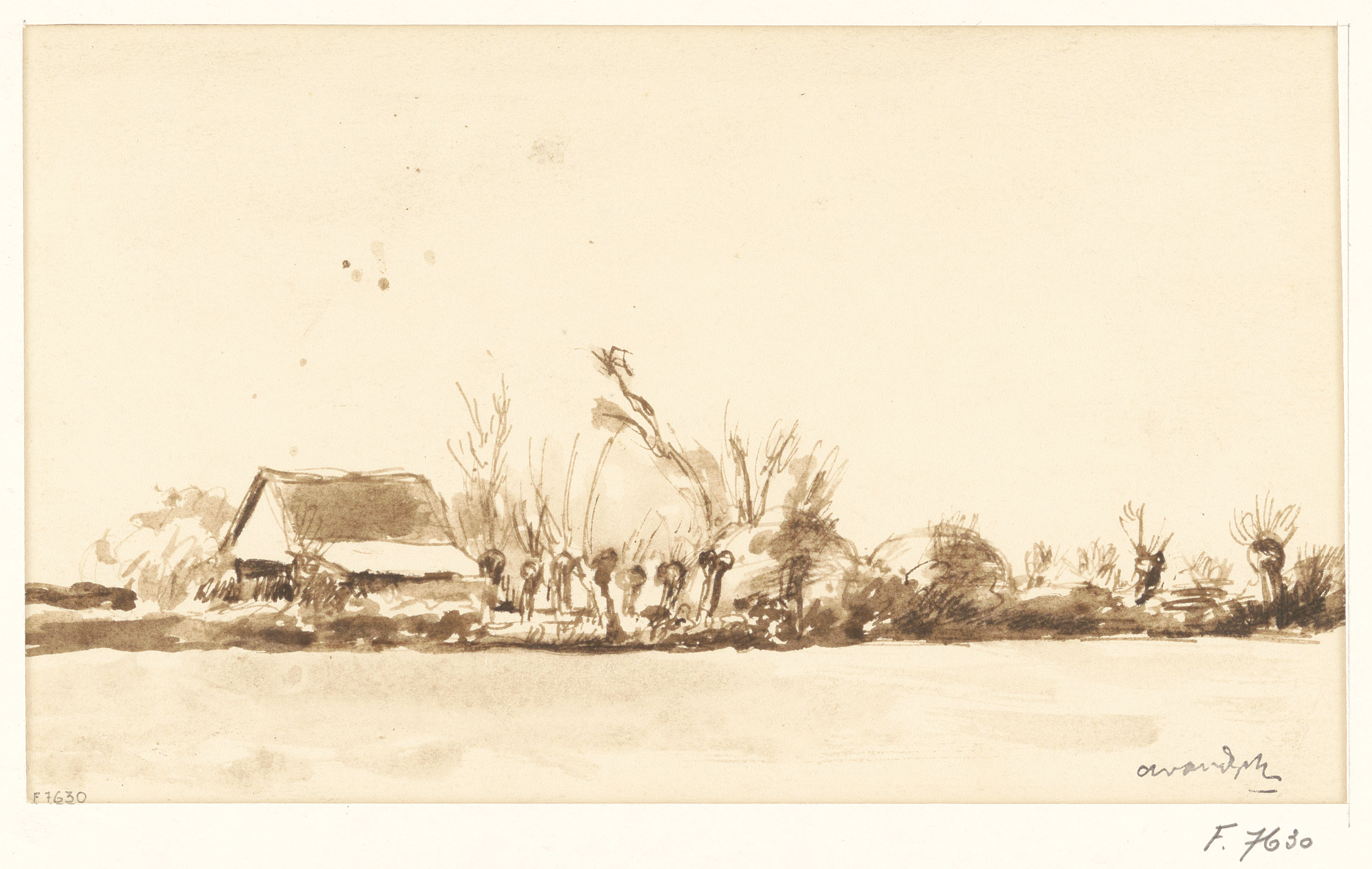
Landscape in Uitkerke, drawing by Albert Van Dyck, 1945, Print cabinet of the Royal Library of Belgium, F 7630
