= 11C-UCB-J =

Names
- Preferred IUPAC name (4R)-1-{[3-(^{11}C)Methylpyridin-4-yl]methyl}-4-(3,4,5-trifluorophenyl)pyrrolidin-2-one
- Other names [11C]UCB-J; ^{11}C-UCB-J; [^{11}C]UCB-J

Identifiers
CAS Number	2098041-11-1
3D model (JSmol)	Interactive image
ChemSpider	103882818
PubChem CID	74539761
UNII	99PJR3QL3Y
CompTox Dashboard (EPA)	DTXSID801127334
- InChI: InChI=1S/C17H15F3N2O/c1-10-7-21-3-2-11(10)8-22-9-13(6-16(22)23)12-4-14(18)17(20)15(19)5-12/h2-5,7,13H,6,8-9H2,1H3/t13-/m0/s1/i1-1 Key: RFSDYRVOGWHOFT-XOTOJZTHSA-N
- SMILES: [11CH3]C1=CN=CC=C1CN1C[C@H](CC1=O)C1=CC(F)=C(F)C(F)=C1

Properties
Chemical formula	C_{17}H_{15}F_{3}N_{2}O
Molar mass	320.315 g·mol^{−1}
- Except where otherwise noted, data are given for materials in their standard state (at 25 °C [77 °F], 100 kPa). Infobox references

11C-UCB-J is a PET tracer for imaging the synaptic vesicle glycoprotein 2A in the human brain.

It is used to study the brain changes associated with several diseases including Alzheimer's disease, schizophrenia, and depression.
