= Peter Van Dyck =

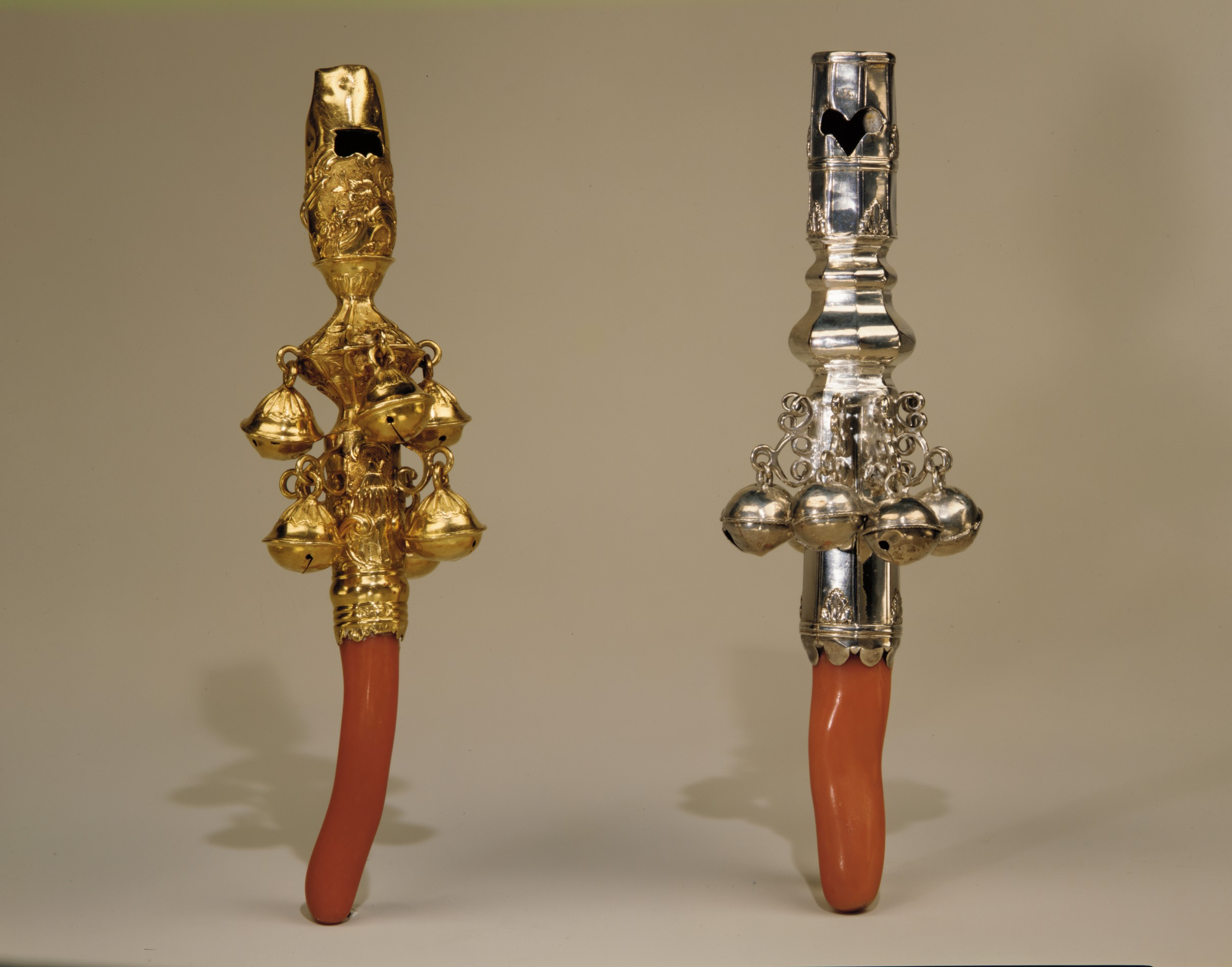
Rattle, whistle, and bells by Peter Van Dyck, 1735–1745

Peter Van Dyck (August 17, 1684 - 1750) was a silversmith from the Thirteen Colonies, active in New York City.

Van Dyck was born in Hackensack, New Jersey, and apprenticed in 1700 to silversmith Bartholomew Le Roux in New York. In 1704 he was named in the "list of men that have signed to goe [sic] with Capt. Nicholas Evertsen on an expedition against a french [sic] privateer which appeared off the coast." He married Le Roux's daughter, Rachel Le Roux, on October 27, 1711, and after her early death, remarried the wealthy heiress Cornelia Van Varick on July 22, 1715. He advertised in the New York Gazette as a goldsmith on March 28, 1728. Van Dyck was active in the civic life and politics of New York City. In 1708 he was named constable of the East Ward, in 1727 made Appraiser of Lottery, and in 1730 appointed Assessor of City.

His will of 1 August 1, 1750, reads as follows: "Peter Van Dyck, being very sick, leave to my son, Richard £5, in lieu of all pretence as heir-at-law, grandchildren, Daniel and Richard Shotford, £40 each at interest till of age. Daughters, Hannah and Cornelia, each a silver mugg, to Lena, my silver teapot, Sarah, my smallest silver tankard, Mary, my largest silver tankard, each by weight, as part of share in Estate. All rest of Estate to children, Richard, Rudolphus, Hannah, Cornelia, Lena, Sarah and Mary." The will was proved on January 5, 1751.

His works are collected in the Metropolitan Museum of Art, Clark Art Institute, Museum of Fine Arts, Houston, and Yale University Art Gallery.
