= Richard Van Dyck =

American silversmith, engraver, and importer

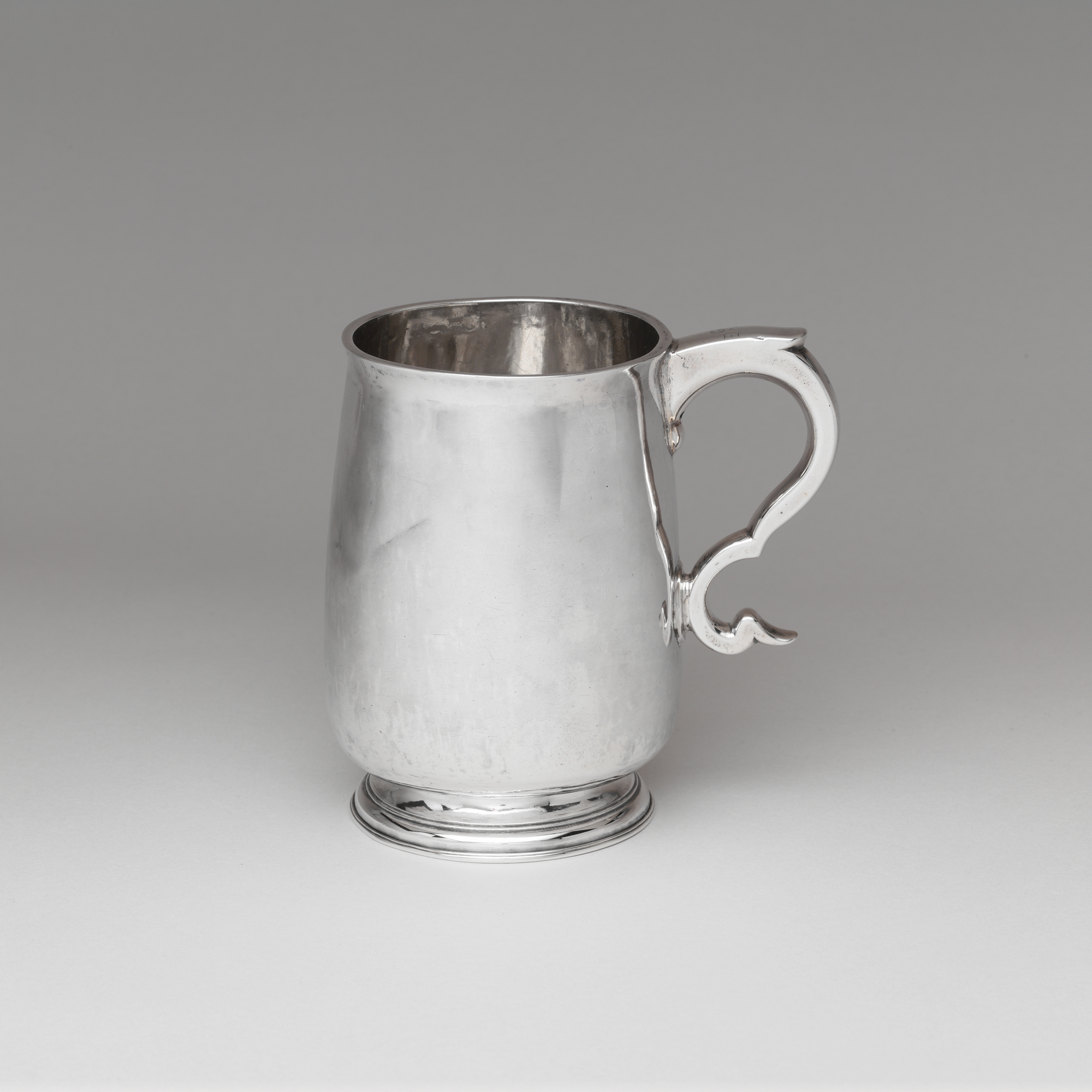
Cann by Richard Van Dyck, 1750–1770

Richard Van Dyck (1717–1770) was a silversmith, engraver, and merchant and importer active in New York City in the Thirteen Colonies.

Van Dyck was the son of silversmith Peter Van Dyck, and christened on December 4, 1717, in New York City. In 1746 he was commissioned to engrave the bills of credit that helped to finance an invasion of Canada during King George's War. From 1750 to 1756 he occasionally advertised his shop at Hanover Square, and appears to have abandoned working in silver sometime between 1753 and 1756 as he became an importer of decorative items from Europe and the Orient. In 1753 he advertised wrought plate, looking glasses, sconces, European and Indian goods, and best "Florence oyl."

His work is collected in the Metropolitan Museum of Art and Yale University Art Gallery.
