= Johann Gottfried Dyck =

German bookseller and author

Johann Gottfried Dyck (also Johannes, Dik or Dyk; 24 April 1750 – 21 May 1813) was a German bookseller and author.

== Life ==
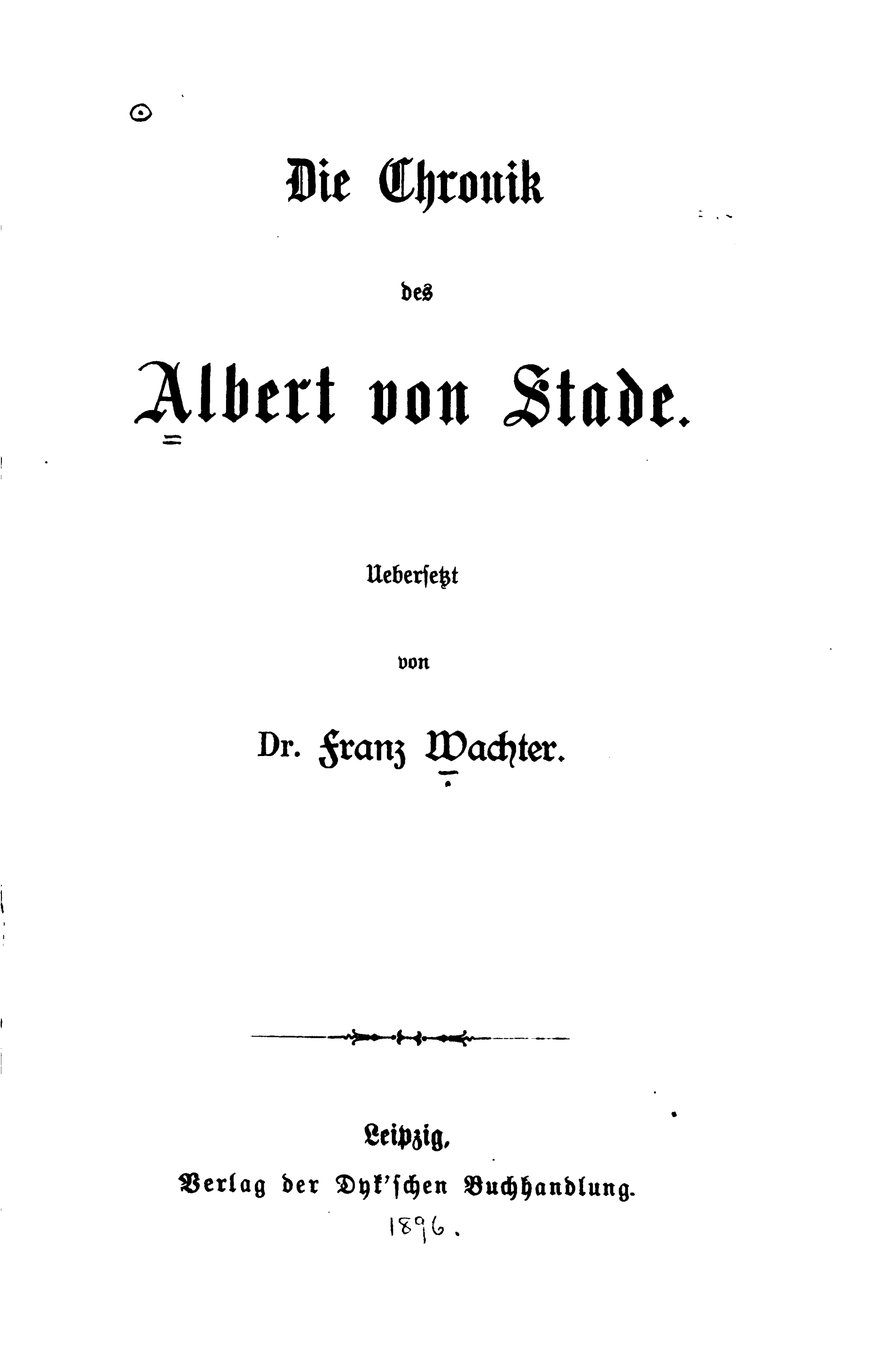
Franz Wachter: Die Chronik des Albert von Stade. Dyk'sche Buchhandlung, Leipzig, 1896

Dyck was born on 24 April 1750 in Leipzig, the son of a publisher. He enrolled at the University of Leipzig, moved to the University of Wittenberg and earned a magister degree there in 1778. During his studies, he became friends with the poet Johann Benjamin Michaelis. After completing his studies, he took over his father's Dyk'sche Buchhandlung in Leipzig, which, under his leadership, became one of the leading booksellers of his time in the field of fine literature.

He himself wrote a number of plays, made stage arrangements and translated various works from French and Italian that appeared in his bookshop; for example, his Sammlungen Komisches Theater der Franzosen für die Deutschen ("Collections of the French Comic Theatre for the Germans", 10 volumes 1777–1785) and Nebentheater ("Side Theatre"). Around 1783, he took over the editing of the literary newspaper Neue Bibliothek der schönen Wissenschaften und freyen Künste ("New Library of the Beautiful Sciences and Free Arts"), which had been published by his own publishing house since 1757. Since he also headed the Wendlerische Freischule, he also published educational and historical treatises. He died in Leipzig on 21 May 1813.

== Works (selection) ==
- Lyrisches Theater der Deutschen. 2 volumes. Leipzig 1782.
- Die sich Liebenden ohne es zu wißen. Ein Lustspiel in drey Akten. Dyk, Leipzig 1782. (digitised)
- Das Mißbindniß, oder der verkannte Hofmeister. Ein rührendes Lustspiel in einem Aufzuge. Stage, Augsburg 1783. (digitised)
- Lustspiele aus der Brandenburgischen Geschichte gezogen. Die Vereinigung. Der verschriebene Bräutigam aus Paris. Dyk, Leipzig 1783. (digitised)
- Leichtsinn und Verführung. Trauerspiel. Dyk, Leipzig 1784. (digitised)
- Charaktere der vornehmsten Dichter aller Nationen. Nachträge zu Sulzers allgemeinen Theorie der schönen Künste, 8 volumes. Leipzig 1792–1800.
- Der prächtige Geizige, oder Die Contrebande. Ein Lustspiel in 5 Akten. Allen rechtschafnen Juristen gewidmet. Dyk, Leipzig 1785. (digitised)
- Thomas More. Ein Trauerspiel. Dyk, Leipzig 1786. (digitalised)
- Ferdinand Pernau. Ein Trauerspiel in 5 Akten. Dyk, Leipzig 1787. (digitised)
- Zwey unruhige Nächte, oder Neigung und Abneigung. Ein Schauspiel in fünf Akten. Dyk, Leipzig 1787. (digitised)
- Sechs Wagen mit Contrebande, oder Großthun und Knickerey. Dyk, Leipzig 1887. (digitised)
- Omar, oder: Das Ehegesetz der Tatarn. Ein Schauspiel mit untermischten Gesängen in drey Acten. Grätz 1797. (digitised)
- Gegengeschenke an die Sudelköche zu Jena und Weimar von einigen dankbaren Großen. Leipzig 1797. (digitised)
- Aly Bey, Sultan von Aegypten. Ein Trauerspiel in fünf Acten. Grätz 1797. (digitised)
- Der standhafte Mann oder: Ehrsucht und Schwatzhaftigkeit. Ein Schauspiel in fünf Akten. Grätz 1898. (digitised)
- Fragen an Kinder über die deutsche Geschichte und Darstellung der für Deutschland traurigen Ereignisse seit 1792. Regensburg, Wetzlar, Frankfurt am Main 1806. (digitised)

== Literature ==
- Lorenz, Sabine (1988–1991). "Johann Gottfried Dyck". In Killy, Walther (ed.). Literaturlexikon. Autoren und Werke deutscher Sprache. Vol. 3. Gütersloh / Munich: Bertelsmann. p. 136. ISBN 3-570-04673-7. Published as CD-ROM by Directmedia, Berlin 1998, ISBN 3-932544-13-7).
- Rochus von Liliencron (1877). "Dyck, Johann Gottfried" . Allgemeine Deutsche Biographie (in German). Vol. 5. Leipzig: Duncker & Humblot. p. 509.
- Lukas, Wolfgang (2001). "Dyk, Johann Gottfried: Leichtsinn und Verführung, oder Die Folgen der Spielsucht". In Hollmer, Heide; Meier, Albert (eds.). Dramenlexikon des 18. Jahrhunderts. Munich: C. H. Beck. pp. 53–54.
