= Ruegger =

Ruegger is a surname. Notable people with the surname include:

- Charlotte Ruegger (1876-1959), Swiss composer and violinist
- Elsa Ruegger (1881–1924), Swiss cellist
- Silvia Ruegger (1961–2019), Canadian long-distance runner
- Tom Ruegger (born 1955/1956), American animator, screenwriter, storyboard artist, and lyricist
