= Laurent Halleux fund =

Archives in the Royal Conservatory of Brussels

The Laurent Halleux collection is the donation, to the library of the Royal Conservatory of Brussels, of printed scores and manuscripts from the Belgian violinist Laurent Halleux (1897–1964), by his daughter, Suzanne Keller-Halleux.

== Biography ==
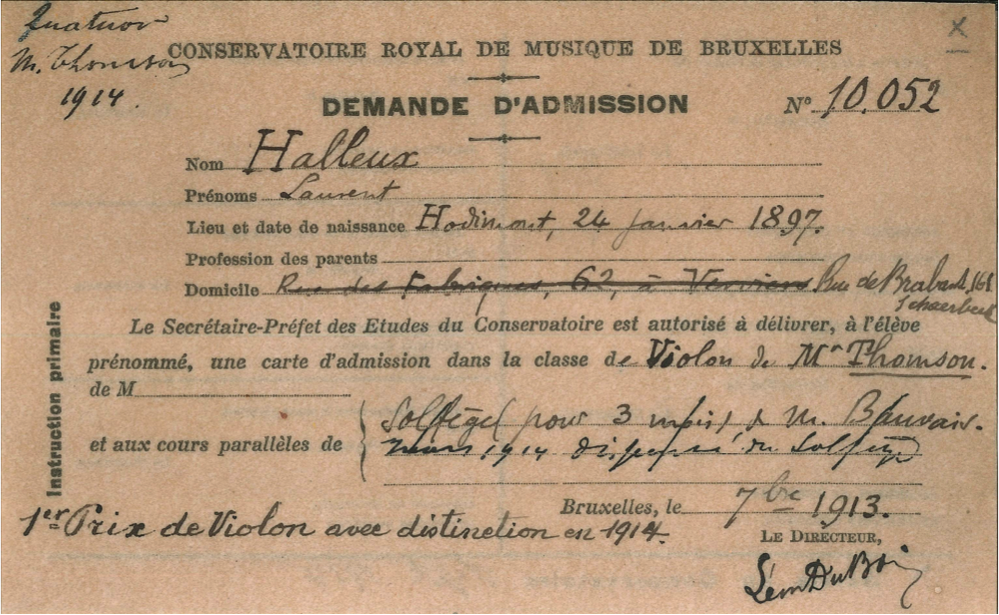
Student card of L. Halleux at the Royal Conservatory of Brussels

After having obtained the coveted Prix Vieuxtemps in 1912, Laurent Halleux (1897-1964), born in the Belgian city of Verviers where he studies at the local Conservatory, concludes his educational journey at the Royal Conservatory of Brussels with César Thomson and obtains the first violin prize in 1914. From 1912 onwards, aged only fifteen, he plays the second violin with his fellow students Alphonse Onnou, Germain Prévost and Fernand Quinet in the Pro Arte Quartet, that will receive, in 1932, thanks to its international popularity, the title of « Quartet to the Belgian Court ». Renowned for the interpretation of modernist and avant-garde works including those of Stravinsky, Milhaud, Honegger or Martinů, the quartet is also impassioned with the classic repertoire.

On the eve of WWII, three of the four members of the quartet migrate to the United States, but when Onnou dies shortly after (1940), Halleux leaves the band in 1943 to successively join the Roth Quartet, the New London String Quartet and the Hungarian String Quartet. Naturalised American in 1945, he settles in L.A. to work with the Los Angeles Philharmonic as well as with the Metro-Goldwyn-Mayer and RKO Pictures studios to record film music.

After an American career of more than twenty years as chamber musician and pedagogue, he returns to Belgium in 1962 where he dies two years later.

== The collection ==
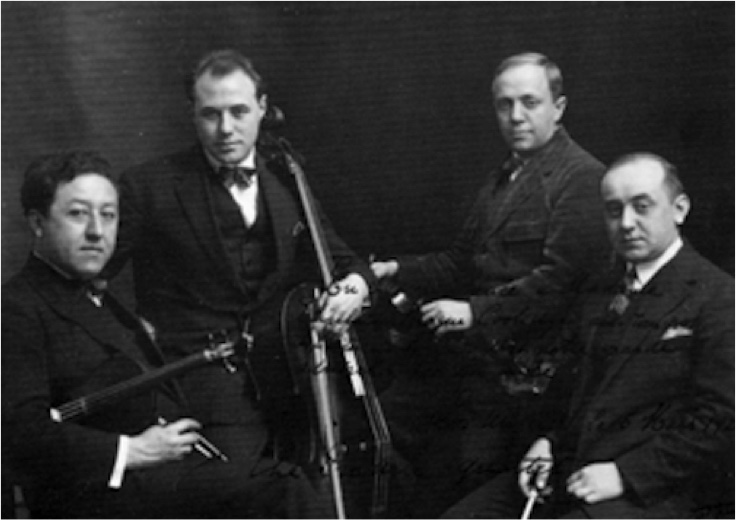
The Pro Arte Quartet ca. 1930, from left to right: A. Onnou, R. Maas, L. Halleux and G. Prévost (Library of the Royal Conservatory of Brussels, B-Bc, CR-II-0540)

The Halleux collection offers the peculiarity to be, in most cases, a collection of Second Violin scores for execution by the Pro Arte Quartet, the New London String Quartet or at the film studios. Quantitatively rather limited as it consists of 275 scores, the collection is remarkable by the exceptional quality of certain pieces, and more particularly by the 54 autographs containing Halleux' annotations – his signature or his specifications regarding nuances, bowing and fingering.

=== The American contingent ===
The journey of the Pro Arte Quartet in the United States explains the presence of numerous scores – autograph manuscripts, copies of manuscripts or facsimile – of American or naturalised American composers in the collection, of which fourteen have been interpreted by the famous quartet. While only few of these such as Aaron Copland or Roy Harris are known in Europe, others remained unnoticed on the old continent. This is for example the case of Robert Franklyn, composer, arranger and orchestrator of film music between 1940 and 1966.

To this same contingent belongs the Czech – naturalised American – composer Bohuslav Martinů, with whom the Pro Arte Quartet maintained a privileged relationship, as it brought two of his works in world première and held several of his works in its repertoire.

=== An unicum ===
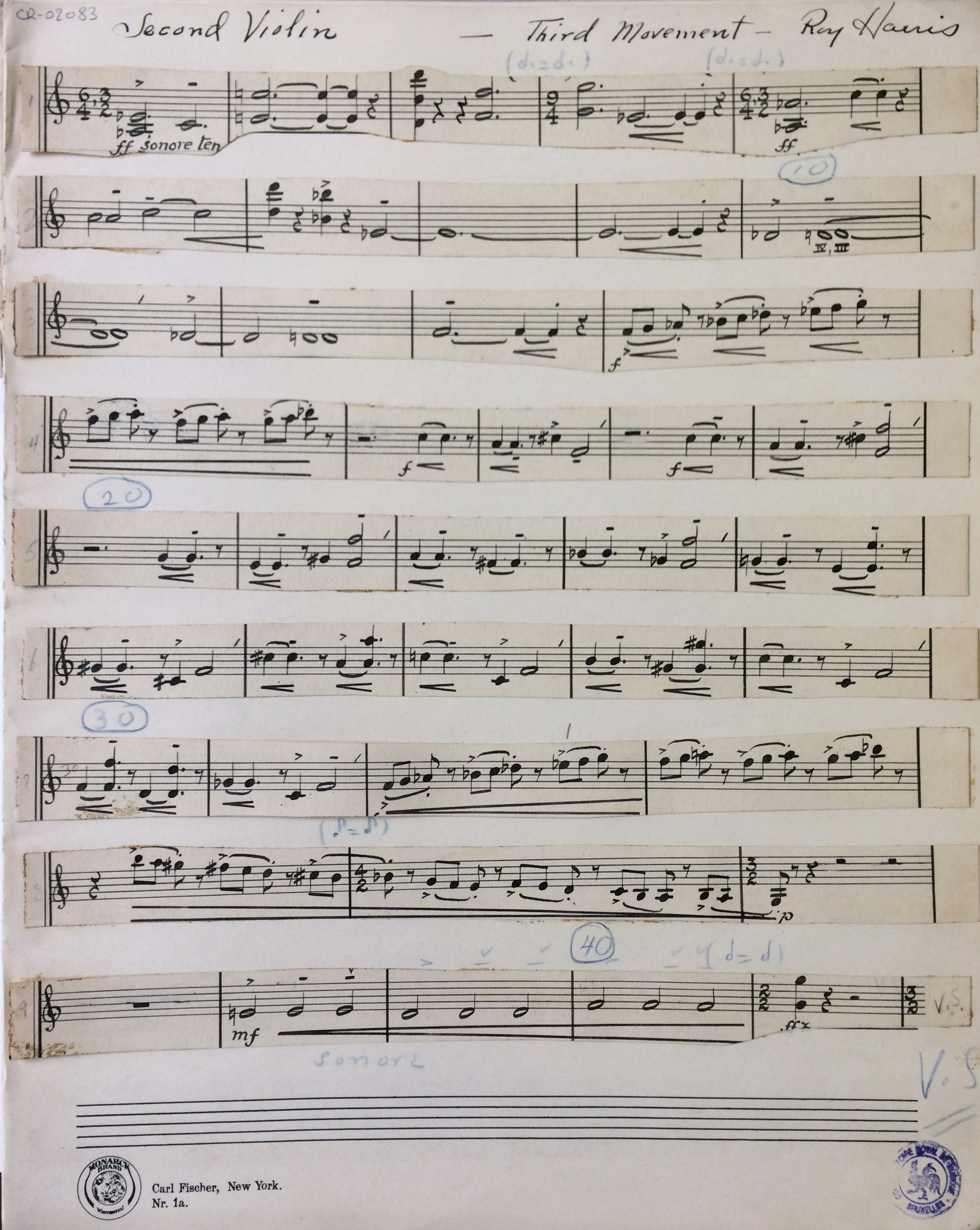
Version 1 of the Quartet n°2 of Roy Harris (Library of the Royal Conservatory of Brussels, B-Bc, CR-02083)

While it has been established that several manuscripts of the Halleux collection, autographs or copies, supported the worldwide or European creation of certain pieces such as the Quartet n°2 of Jerzy Fitelberg, the Quartet n°1 on Indian themes of Frederik Jacobi or 4 Indiscretions of Louis Gruenberg, the score of Quartet n°2 of Roy Harris, also globally premiered, represents a remarkable case: two handwritten versions of the same piece coexist, esp. of the third movement.

=== Stravinsky and the non-American composers ===
The Halleux collection also comprises autograph manuscripts of non-American composers including the Belgians Jean Absil and Marcel Poot, the French Darius Milhaud and Albert Roussel, the Austrian Artur Schnabel or the British Frank Bridge.

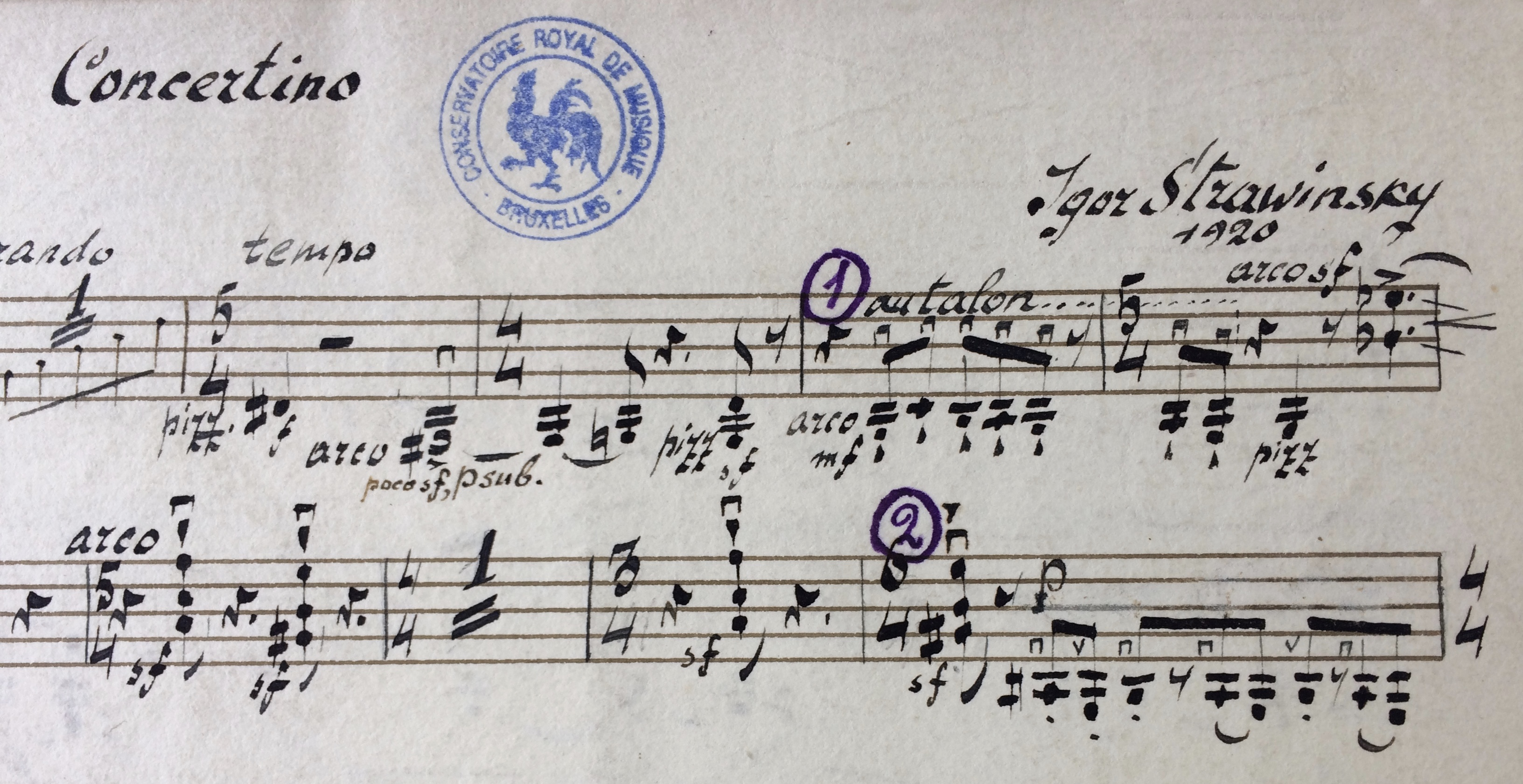
Detail of I. Stravinsky's Concertino pour string quartet (op. 20) autograph manuscript (Library of the Royal Conservatory of Brussels, B-Bc, CR)

But the most exceptional autograph conserved in this collection is the Concertino for string quartet, op. 20 by Stravinsky, of which the Pro Arte Quartet gave a first audition in Belgium in 1922. Close to the Belgian Paul Collaer, founder of the Pro Arte Concerts, the Russian composer (naturalised French in 1934, American in 1945) has benefitted from the unconditional support of the quartet for the international diffusion of his music.

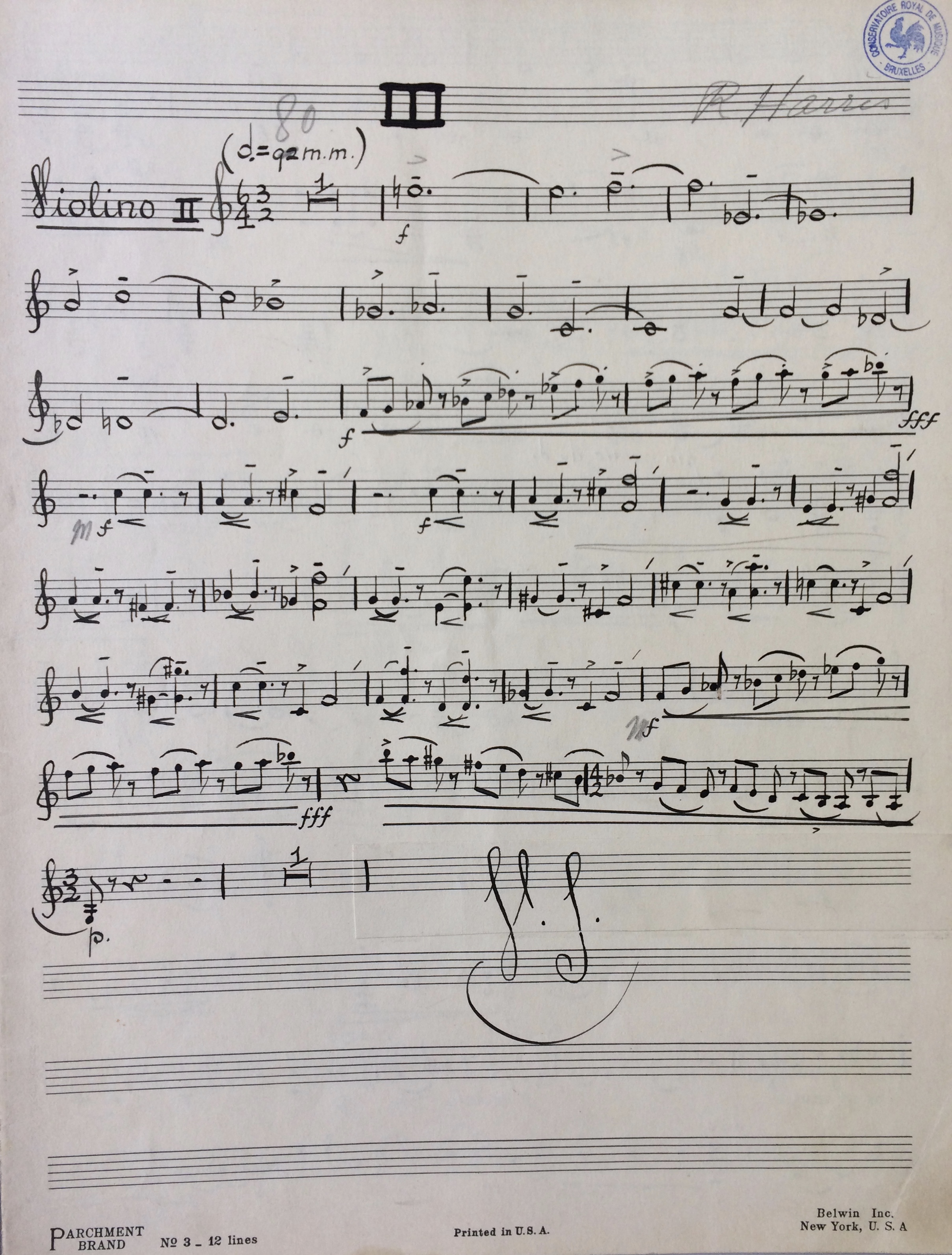
Version 2 of the Quartet n°2 of Roy Harris (Library of the Royal Conservatory of Brussels, B-Bc, CR-02083)

The Halleux collection is particularly adequate for the study of American music from the early 20th century, and in particular of film music developed on this continent.

== Appendix ==
=== Bibliography ===
- Anne Van Malderen, « Historique et réception des diverses formations Pro Arte (1912-1947): apport au répertoire de la musique contemporaine », thesis presented for the obtention of the grade of Doctor in History, Art and Archeology (orientation music), Louvain-la-Neuve, Catholic University of Louvain, 2012.
