= Józef Wieniawski =

Polish pianist, composer and conductor (1837 - 1912)

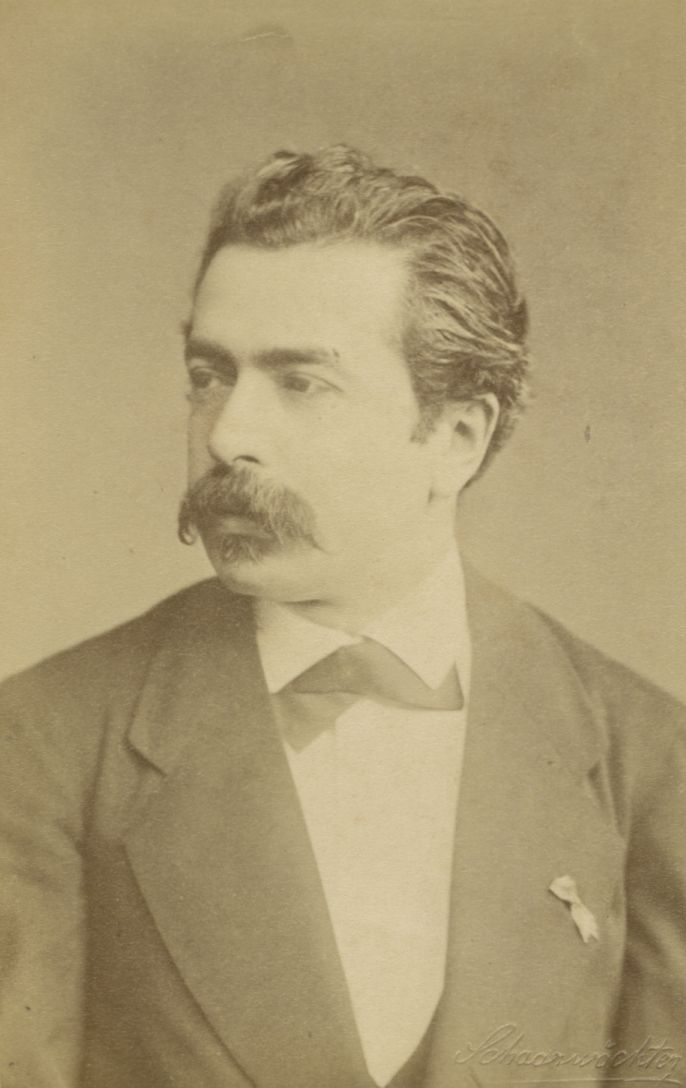
Portrait of Józef Wieniawski

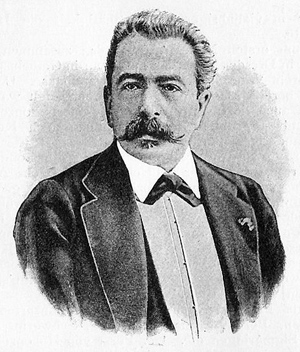
Portrait of Józef Wieniawski

Józef Wieniawski (23 May 1837 – 11 November 1912) was a Polish pianist, composer, conductor and teacher. He was born in Lublin, the younger brother of the famous violinist Henryk Wieniawski. After Franz Liszt, he was the first pianist to publicly perform all the études by Chopin. He appeared with Liszt in recitals in Paris, London, Copenhagen, Stockholm, Brussels, Leipzig and Amsterdam.

Although now neglected, Józef Wieniawski enjoyed a reputation as one of Europe's finest musicians. Near the end of his life, a journalist asked him how long he intended to serve music. He replied: "As long as I remain young!"

== Life ==
Józef Wieniawski studied at the Conservatoire de Paris with Pierre Zimmermann and Antoine François Marmontel in 1847, leaving in 1850. In 1855 he received a scholarship from the Tsar of Russia to study with Franz Liszt in Weimar and from 1856 until 1858 in Berlin with Adolf Bernhard Marx, with whom he studied music theory.

After he had performed between 1851 and 1853 as a companion to his brother, he decided to follow a separate career as a piano virtuoso. On concert tours through Europe, he performed not only his own compositions, including the Piano Concerto in G minor, but also the works of the composers Beethoven, Schubert, Mendelssohn, Liszt, Schumann and Weber. According to Liszt, he was the first pianist after him to perform Chopin's études, all in public.

After returning to Paris he established friendly relations with Rossini, Gounod, Berlioz and Wagner, also approaching the Imperial Court and becoming a favorite artist of Napoleon III. He then moved to Moscow where he was named to the piano faculty at the Moscow Conservatory, founded in 1866. Contrary to the affirmations of many established sources, he never became a professor at the Royal Conservatory of Brussels but lived again in this city from 1902. He died in Brussels, aged 75.

== Collaborations ==
Józef Wieniawski also had works by contemporary Polish composers in the repertoire, such as Stanisław Moniuszko, Moritz Moszkowski, Carl Tausig, Władysław Żeleński, Antoni Stolpe and Edouard Wolff. As a chamber musician he frequently performed with the most renowned violinists, cellists and singers of his time, including Pablo de Sarasate, Henri Vieuxtemps, Apolinary Katski, Eugène Ysaÿe, Jenő Hubay, Leopold Auer, Joseph Joachim, Carlo Alfredo Piatti, Ignacy Jan Paderewski, Louis Diémer, Pauline Viardot and Marcella Sembrich.

In addition to a symphony and a piano concerto, Wieniawski composed among others a piano sonata, 24 études, two concert études, a ballad in E flat minor, polonaise, mazurka, barcarolles, impromptus, waltzes, and many short piano pieces. His compositions, written to be played at his own concerts, bear superior artistic qualities and technical difficulties of the highest level, giving so a clear idea of their author's performing abilities. He left 11 mechanical recordings of his piano pieces which to date have not come to light.

== Compositions ==
- Allegro de Sonate for Violin and Piano, Op. 2
- Valse de Concert No. 1 in D-flat major, Op. 3 "À mon maître et ami Mr A. Marmontel, Professseur au Conservatoire de Paris"
- Tarantella, Op. 4 "À Monsieur F. Liszt"
- Grand Duo Polonais for Violin and Piano, Op. 5
- Valse de Salon, Op.7 "À Son Altesse La Princesse de Hohenzollern-Hechingen"
- Barcarolle-Caprice, Op. 9
- Souvenir of Lublin, Op. 12
- Piano Concerto, Op. 20
- Polacca, Op. 21
- Piano Sonata, Op. 22
- Fantaise et Fugue, Op. 25 "À Monsieur Joachim Raff"
- Sonata for Cello and Piano, Op. 26
- Sur l'Océan, Op. 28
- Valse de Concert, Op. 30
- Ballata, Op. 31
- String Quartet in A minor, Op. 32
- Improviso, Op. 34
- Deuxieme Tarantelle, Op. 35 "À Madame Anette Essipoff"
- Nocturne, Op. 37 "À Mademoiselle Marie Iwanowska"
- Piano Trio, Op. 40
- Fantasia for 2 Pianos, Op. 42 "À Monsieur Rodolphe Strobl"
- Guillame le Taciture, Overture for Orchestra, Op. 43
- 24 Études de mécanisme et de style for Piano, Op. 44
- Reverie for Piano, Op. 45 "À Mademoiselle Jeanne de Fortis"
- Valse-Caprice, Op. 46 "À Monsieur Paul de Schlözer"
- Symphony in D major, Op. 49

== Discographie ==
- 2008 : Piano Works vol. 1 – Acte Préalable AP0184
- 2014 : Piano Works vol. 2 – Acte Préalable AP0291
- 2014 : Guillaume le Taciturne - Symphony – Acte Préalable AP0331
- 2017 : Piano Works vol. 3 – Acte Préalable AP0405
- 2017 : Piano Works vol. 4 – Acte Préalable AP0406
- 2018 : Complete Vocal Music – Acte Préalable AP0410
- 2020 : Complete Chamber Works vol. 1 – Acte Préalable AP0468
- 2020 : Complete Chamber Works vol. 2 – Acte Préalable AP0468
- 2020 : Piano Works vol. 5 – Acte Préalable AP0474
- 2025: WIENIAWSKI, J.: Piano Works - Piano Sonata / Polonaises Nos. 2-4 / Ballade (Romantic Piano, Vol. 5) - Naxos Records 8.574583

== Legacy ==
=== Józef Wieniawski Fund ===
The Library of the Royal Conservatory of Brussels conserves an important series of autograph manuscripts from J. Wieniawski, donated by his daughter, Elisabeth Wieniawski, collected in the Józef Wieniawski fund. They include the Sonata for piano and violin, Op. 20 and the Concerto for piano and orchestra, Op. 24, dedicated to Leopold II of Belgium, amongst others.

== See also ==
- Henryk Wieniawski
