= Auguste Rouma =

- Born: 14 June 1802; Liège
- Died: 14 May 1874 (aged 71); Liège
- Occupation(s): violinist, violin teacher
- Instrument: violin
- Formerly of: Orchestre du Grand Théâtre de Liège

Auguste Rouma, born in Liège on 14 June 1802 and died in the same city on 14 May 1874, was a Belgian violinist.

== Biography ==
Auguste Rouma's studied violin in Liège with the virtuoso Dieudonné-Pascal Pieltain (1754-1833), himself a pupil of the Italian composer and violinist Ivan Mane Jarnowick (1747-1804). Rouma was musician in the orchestra of the Grand Théâtre de Liège, but he was above all a teacher and violin master recognised by his peers and one of the representatives of the Liège violin school of the 19th century, along with Lambert Joseph Massart (1811-1892), François Prume (1816-1849), Léonard-Joseph Gaillard (1766-1837), Henri Vieuxtemps (1820-1881) and Eugène Ysaÿe (1858-1931), among others.

Auguste Rouma had many pupils, including Jean-Jacques Masset (1811-1903), a tenor, violinist and composer in Paris, but above all the renowned violin virtuoso Hubert Léonard (1819-1890), professor of violin at the Royal Conservatory of Brussels (1849-1866) and professor of chamber music at the Royal Conservatory of Liège (1870-1872), who was his pupil and protégé. After discovering his talent at the age of 8, Auguste Rouma took charge of Léonard's musical education as well as his overall upbringing; he took him in and fed him before he went to study at the Paris Conservatoire. Hubert Léonard revered his teacher and dedicated his collection of studies, La Gymnastique du Violoniste, published in 1861 by Schott in Mainz, to him

== The Auguste Rouma Collection ==
In 2015, the library of the Royal Conservatory of Brussels acquired Auguste Rouma's personal collection. This collection is now known as the Auguste Rouma Collection. It contains several thousand documents, including many scores not listed in the Répertoire International des Sources Musicales (RISM). In addition to Auguste Rouma's personal documents, the collection contains the archives of two other major figures in the Liège violin school, Dieudonné-Pascal Pieltain, his teacher who bequeathed all his manuscripts to him in his will, and Hubert Léonard, his favourite pupil.

=== Handwritten and printed scores ===
The Auguste Rouma Collection contains a large number of scores for the violin, spanning a period of around 150 years. There are hundreds of concertos, fantasias, caprices and numerous chamber music scores ranging from duos to octets. There are also numerous works for pianoforte, operas, melodies and songs.

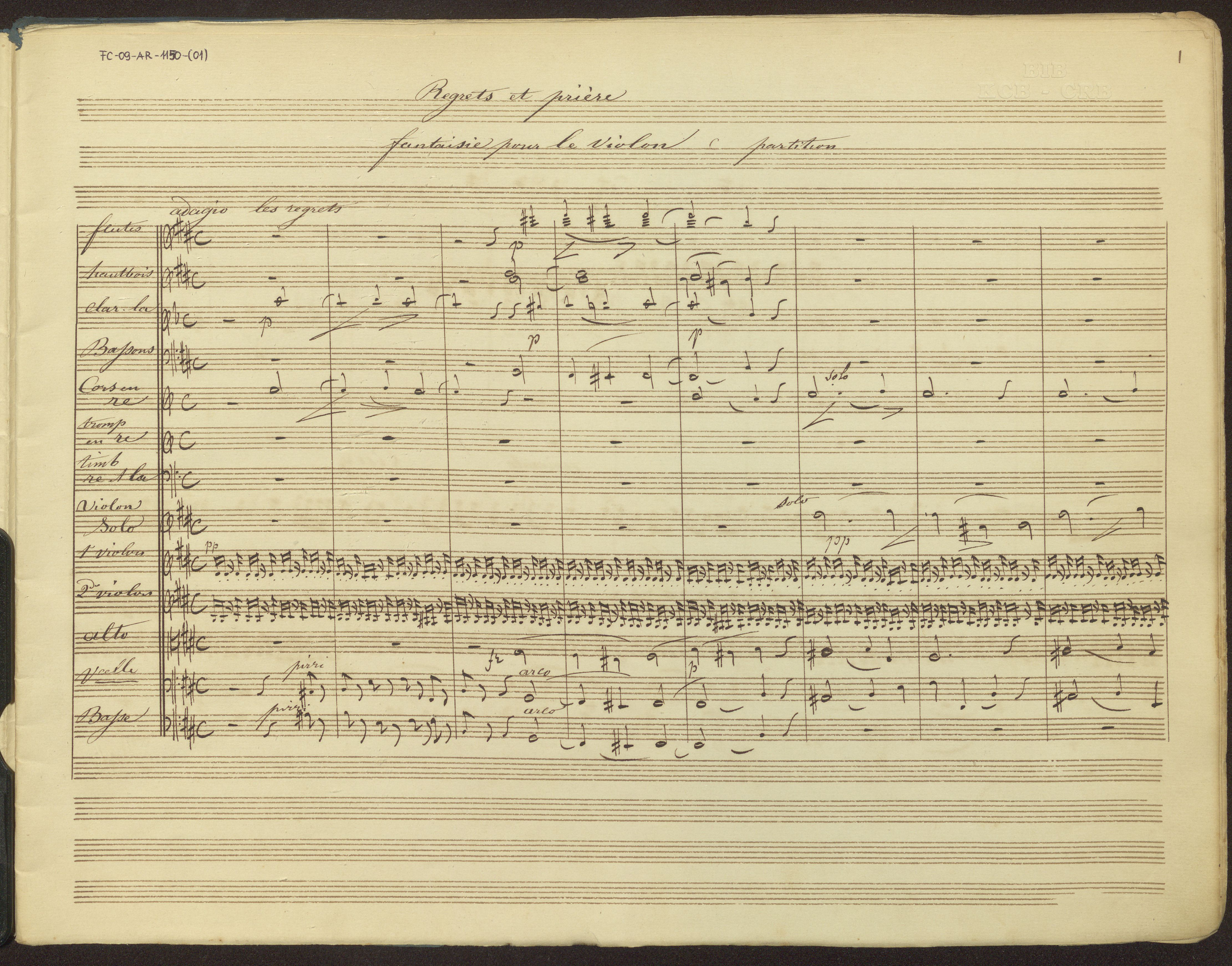
Fantaisie pour le violon by Léonard, manuscript edition by Auguste Rouma

The sources in the collection are very diverse: there are nineteenth-century editions from Liège, conductors for symphonic and concertante works, sketches, technical manuals for the violin and a number of collections of études and caprices. Exploration of the Auguste Rouma Collection has also revealed a number of autograph manuscripts, notably by Dieudonné-Pascal Pieltain (160 quartets and 30 concertos) and Hubert Léonard (fantasias, concertos and concerto cadenzas).

The fonds contains transcriptions by Auguste Rouma, in particular the orchestral score for Henri Vieuxtemps's First Violin Concerto No. 1 Op. 10, as well as works by Hubert Léonard such as his third violin fantasia: Regrets et Prière.

=== Ancillary documents, letters, correspondence ===
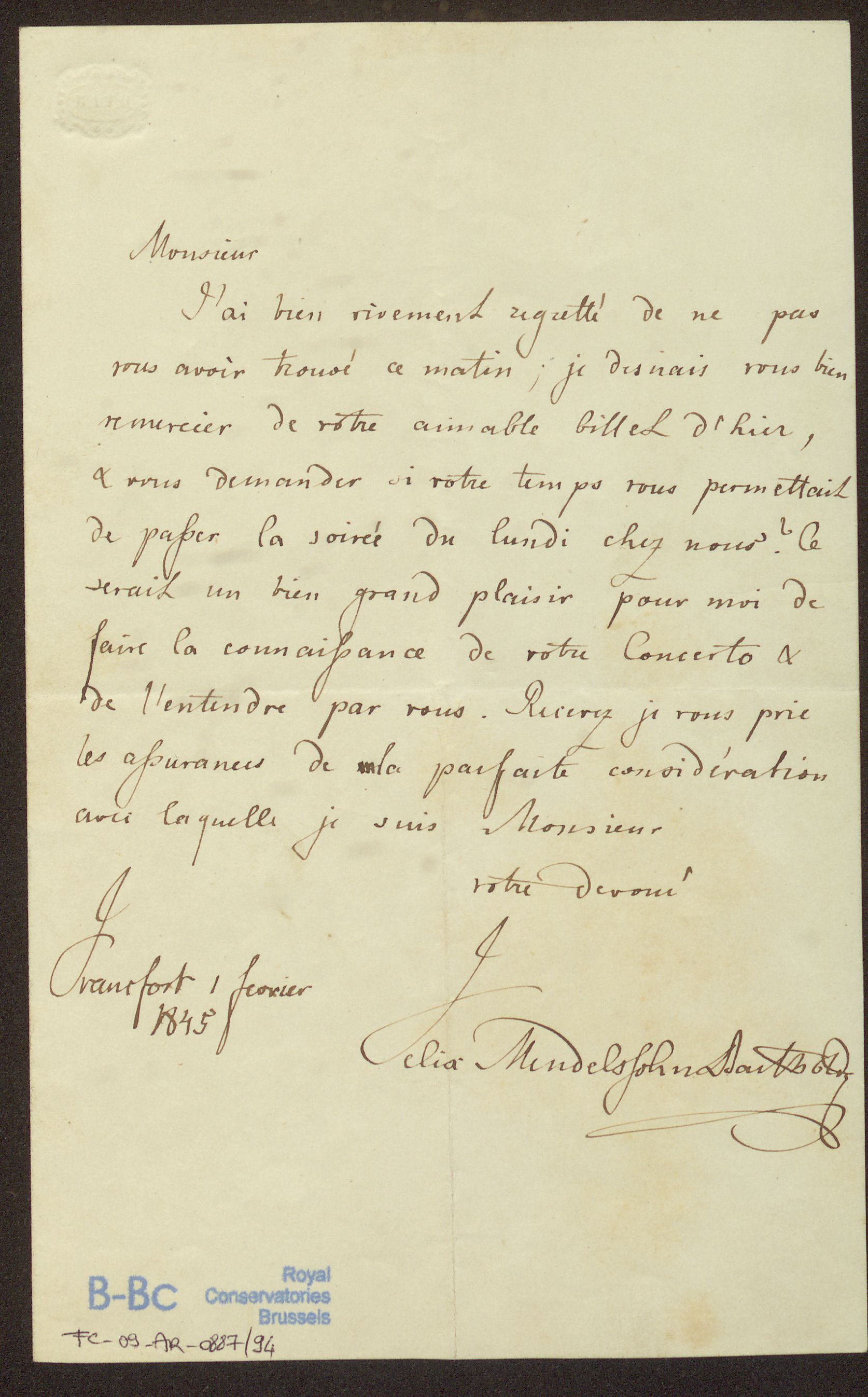
Letter from Mendelssohn to Leonard

The Auguste Rouma Collection also contains around 300 archival documents: press articles, concert programmes, administrative and accounting documents and, above all, a vast correspondence containing letters from illustrious musicians such as Louis Spohr (1784-1859), Niccolò Paganini (1782-1840), Joseph Joachim (1831-1907), Pierre Baillot (1771-1842) and Félix Mendelssohn (1809-1847).

A number of letters are addressed to Auguste Rouma by Liège musicians of his time, such as François Prume, Léonard Joseph Gaillard and Nicolas-Lambert Wéry (1789-1867).

=== Iconography ===
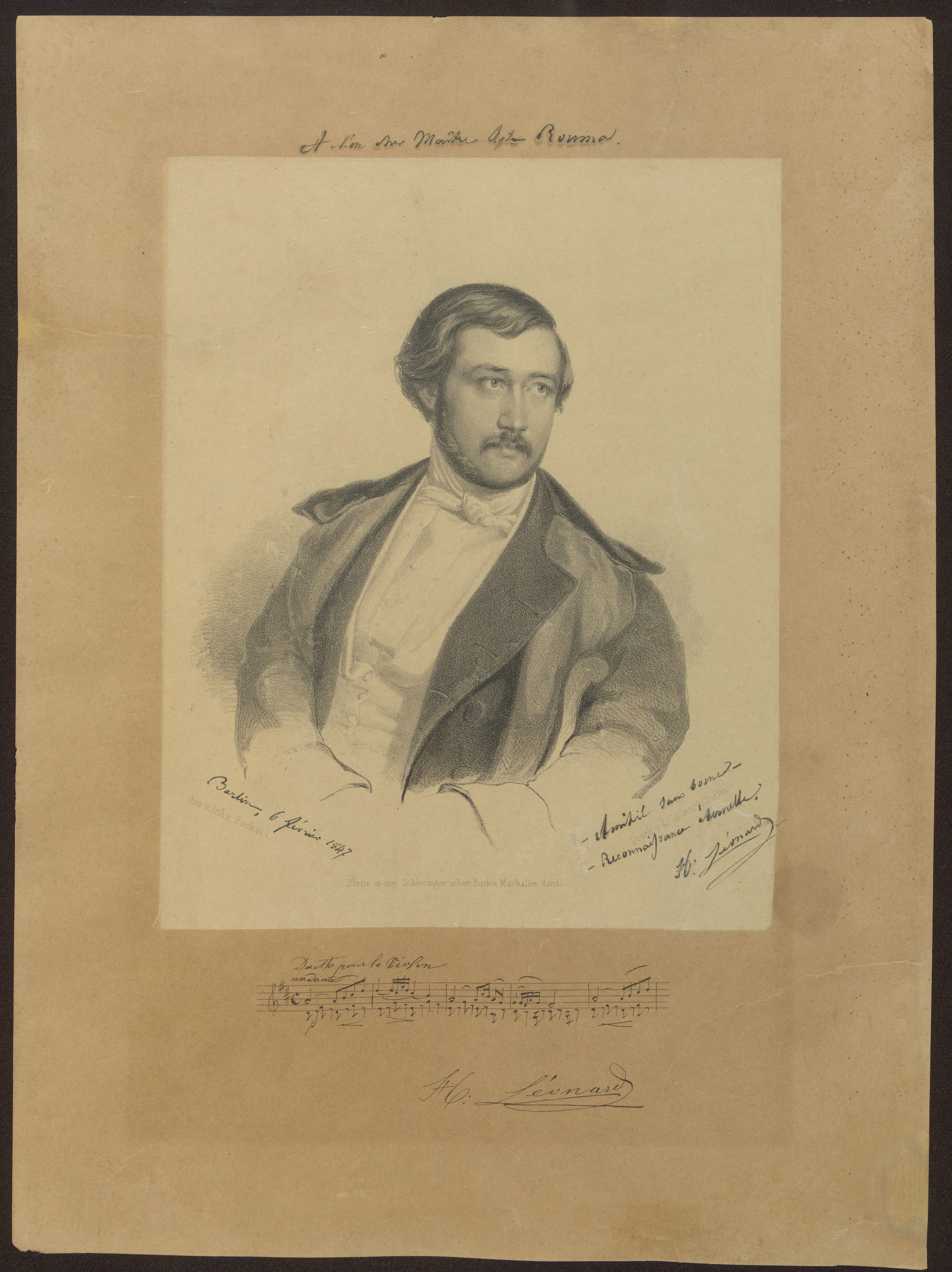
Portrait of Hubert Léonard

The Auguste Rouma Collection contains a rich collection of around 70 iconographic documents, restored in 2024. There are many engravings and drawings depicting portraits of violinists such as Henry Vieuxtemps, Hubert Léonard, Pierre Rode (1774-1830) and Giovanni Battista Viotti (1755-1824), as well as other composers such as Wolfgang Amadeus Mozart (1756-1791), Ludwig Van Beethoven (1770-1827), Luigi Cherubini (1760-1842) and Etienne Nicolas Méhul (1763-1817).

The collection also contains engravings, photographs and drawings of non-musicians, city maps and a number of engravings of mythological or genre scenes, the earliest of which date from the mid-seventeenth century.

Some of the engravings, such as those by Vieuxtemps, Léonard, Etienne Soubre (1813-1871) and Charles-Auguste de Bériot (1802-1870), are signed by the composer and dedicated to Rouma, testifying to his friendship with some of the great musicians of his time.
