= Stolpe =

Stolpe (Norwegian: habitational name from the farm name Stolpe(n) mostly from stolpe "pole post" referring to a high and narrow mountain or hill) may refer to:

== Places ==
=== Germany ===
- Stolpe (Berlin), an ancient village in Wannsee, Berlin
- Stolpe, Parchim, a municipality in the district of Parchim, Mecklenburg-Vorpommern
- Stolpe an der Peene, a municipality in the district of Vorpommern-Greifswald, Mecklenburg-Vorpommern
  - Stolpe Abbey
- Stolpe auf Usedom, a municipality in the district Ostvorpommern, Mecklenburg-Vorpommern
- Stolpe, Schleswig-Holstein, a municipality in the district of Plön, Schleswig-Holstein

=== Poland ===
- Stolpe, an archaic version of Stolp, the German name of Słupsk
- Słupia, a river

== People with the surname ==
- Antoni Stolpe (1851–1872), Polish composer and pianist
- Daniel Owen Stolpe (1939–2018), American printmaker
- Gustav Stolpe (1833–1902), Swedish composer
- Hjalmar Stolpe (1841–1905), Swedish entomologist, archaeologist, and ethnographer
- Manfred Stolpe (1936–2019), German politician
- Sven Stolpe (1905–1996), Swedish writer
