= Hubert Léonard =

Belgian violinist and composer (1819–1890)

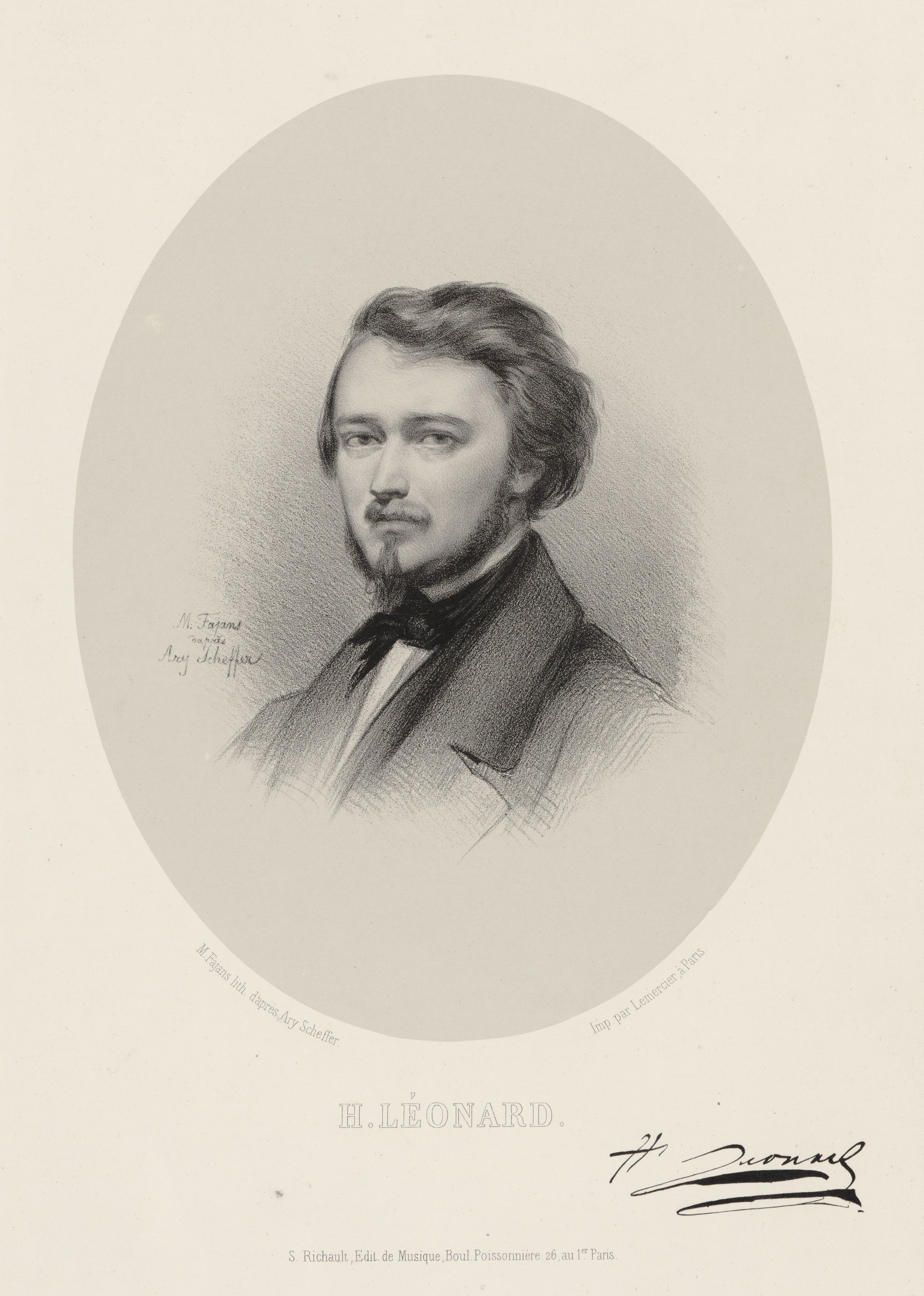
Hubert Léonard

Hubert Léonard (French pronunciation: [ybɛʁ leɔnaʁ]; 7 April 1819 – 6 May 1890) was a Belgian violinist and composer.

== Biography ==
Léonard was born in Liège, United Kingdom of the Netherlands, on 7 April 1819. His earliest preparatory training was given by a prominent teacher of the time, Auguste Rouma, after which he entered the Paris Conservatoire in 1836. There he studied for three years under François Habeneck. In 1844 he started his extended tours which established his reputation as one of the greatest of virtuosos. From 1848 to 1867 he held the position of principal professor of violin playing at the Brussels Conservatoire, having succeeded the celebrated Charles de Bériot. Léonard developed a close friendship with Henri Vieuxtemps, a renowned violinist of the time. Owing to ill health, he resigned and settled in Paris, where he spent the rest of his life, and where he gave lessons. Among his notable students were Alfred De Sève, Martin Pierre Marsick, Henri Marteau, Henry Schradieck, Paul Viardot and César Thomson. He wrote a significant pedagogical work entitled École Léonard.
