= César Thomson =

Belgian violinist, teacher and composer (1857 - 1931)

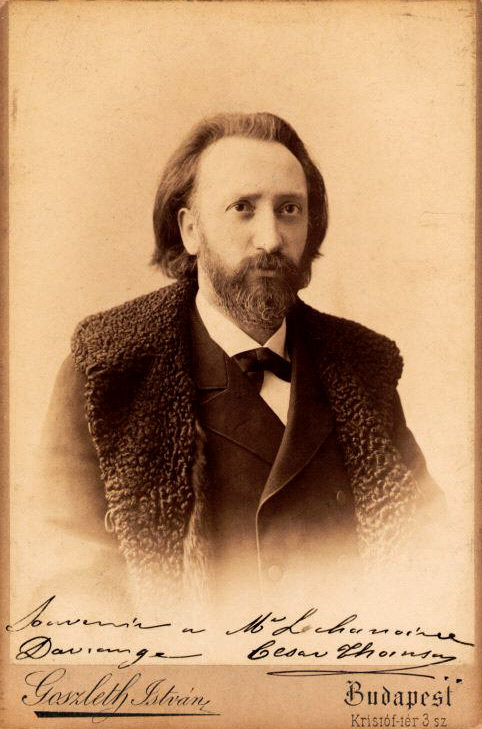
César Thomson

César Thomson (18 March 1857 – 21 August 1931) was a Belgian violinist, teacher, and composer.

== Biography ==
He was born in Liège in 1857. At age seven, he entered the Royal Conservatory of Liège, and studied under Désiré Heynberg, Rodolphe Massart and Jacques Dupuis (1830-1870). By age 16, he was considered to have "a technique unrivalled by any other violinist then living". He was also a student of Hubert Léonard, Henryk Wieniawski and Henri Vieuxtemps.

In 1873, he became concertmaster of the private orchestra (52 players) of Baron Paul von Derwies, a Russian banker and railroad magnate, who, in 1870, had built the Castello di Trevano as a temple to music, in the vicinity of Canobbio, by Lugano, Switzerland. After von Derwies lost his mind and disappeared, Thomson left Lugano in 1877, but not before he had married a local noblewoman, Luisa Riva. In 1879, he played in a Berlin orchestra, and in 1882 was appointed violin professor at his alma mater, the Liège Conservatory. In 1897, he succeeded Eugène Ysaÿe as principal professor at the Brussels Conservatory. In 1898, he established a string quartet, with himself as first violin.

He had great success as a concert soloist at Leipzig in 1891 and Brussels in 1898. His appearances in Britain and the United States were less favourably received, but he was popular in South America. He taught at Ithaca College in New York 1924-27 and at the Juilliard School.

César Thomson revived many of the then obscure works of Niccolò Paganini, and he did much work in editing, arranging and transcribing works from the early Italian school, by composers such as Corelli, Handel, Tartini, J. S. Bach, Nardini and Vitali. His own compositions included a Zigeuner Rhapsody for violin and orchestra (1909). Many well-known violinists studied with him, including Charlotte Ruegger, who also worked as his assistant at the Brussels Conservatory.

César Thomson died in Bissone, near Lugano, in 1931.

== Honours ==
- 1919 : Commander of the Order of Leopold.

== Students ==
His notable students included: Hugo Alfvén, Oskar Back, Aylmer Buesst, Max Donner, Demetrius Dounis, Edwin Grasse, Johan Halvorsen, Guillermo Uribe Holguín, Paul Kochanski, Alma Moodie, Celia Torrá, and Haydn Wood. Thomson played an important role in training two significant American chamber groups, having taught three members of the Flonzaley Quartet and at least two of the Zoellner Quartet, which made its first European appearances at his private soirees.

== Other ==
There is a Boulevarde César Thomson in Liège.
