= Zhay Clark =

American harpist

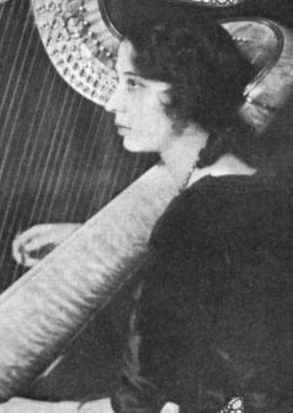
- Zhay Clark, from a 1921 publication.
- Born: July 16, 1895; St. Louis, Missouri
- Died: April 25, 1980 (aged 84); Los Angeles, California
- Other names: Zhay Clark Moor (after 1935)
- Occupation: Harpist

Zhay Clark (July 16, 1895 – April 25, 1980) was an American harpist.

== Early life ==
Zhay Clark was born in St. Louis, Missouri, the daughter of Charles Napier Clark and Emma Piercey Clark. She studied music in Denver and St. Paul.

== Career ==
Clark was harpist with the Denver Philharmonic Society as a young woman. In 1915, she performed at the Panama-Pacific International Exposition in San Francisco, demonstrating harps for the Rudolph Wurlitzer Company. In 1917 and 1918, she toured North America with Swiss cellist Elsa Ruegger. During the 1919-1920 season, she was harpist with the Seattle Symphony Orchestra. She transcribed and arranged Charles Wakefield Cadman's "From the Land of the Sky Blue Water" for solo harp. By 1928, she was billed as "America's foremost harpist." In 1931, she served on the faculty of the Mount St. Mary's College summer school, teaching harp.

Later in her career, Clark worked in the film industry, and performed on radio. In 1929 she worked with actress Corinne Griffith on her harp performance in The Divine Lady, an early experimental sound film. In the 1940s, she played with Frank Sinatra's orchestra. She played harp on Bernard Herrmann's scores for On Dangerous Ground (1951) and Beneath the 12-Mile Reef (1953), and on the Dimitri Tiomkin scores of the films The Thing From Another World (1951) and Take the High Ground! (1953).

== Personal life ==
Zhay Clark married a fellow musician, woodwind player Weyert A. Moor, in 1935; the couple lived in Glendale, California. Moor died in 1959. Clark died in Los Angeles in 1980, aged 84 years.
