= Edwin Grasse =

American violinist, organist and composer

Edwin Grasse (13 August 1884 – 8 April 1954) was an American violinist, organist and composer. Among his compositions were orchestral works, including a symphony and a violin concerto, and much chamber music, including a string quartet.

Born in New York City, Grasse was blind from infancy. He began studying the piano at the age of 3 and the violin at age 5. He studied the violin in his native city with Carl Hauser for nine years before entering the Royal Conservatory of Brussels in 1899. There he excelled under the instruction of César Thomson, earning a premier prix in violin and winning the Prix de Capacité in 1901. The latter prize had not been awarded in a decade. In 1902 he made his debut as a concert violinist in Berlin. He spent the next few years performing throughout Europe. After returning to New York City he studied organ with Daniel Philippi. He was active as a performer mainly in New York City through 1940, appearing regularly in concerts at Carnegie Hall, Steinway Hall, and Town Hall. He died in New York City at the age of 69.

== Selected works ==
- Sonata in C for violin and piano, Op. 14 (1912)
- Scherzo capriccioso for violin and piano, Op. 19 (1912)
- Wellenspiel (Waves at Play), Character Piece for violin and piano (1914)
- Song without Words in G major for violin and piano (1915)
- Im Ruderboot (In a Row Boat) for violin and piano (1915)
- Polonaise No. 1 in C major for violin and piano (1915)
- Promenades à cheval for violin and piano (1932)
