= Bratislav Anastasijević =

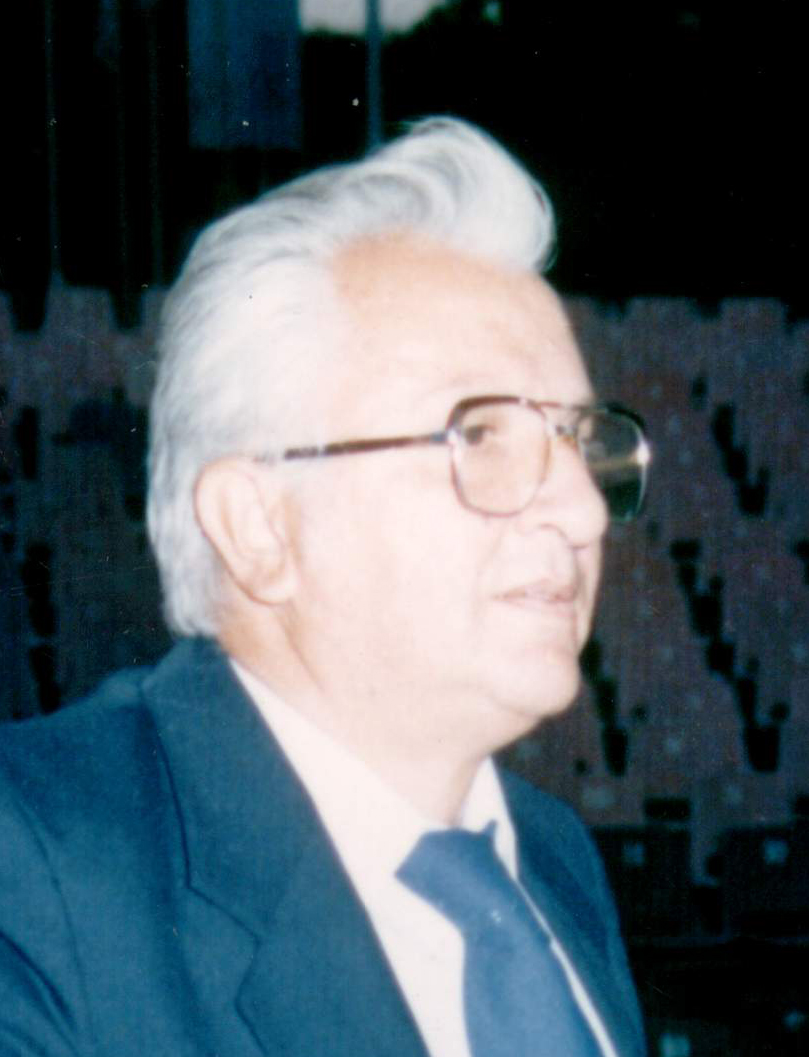
- Born: Serbia
- Died: 12 October 1992 (aged 56)
- Education: Conservatoire Royal de Musique
- Occupation: musician
- Notable work: Bolani Dojcin
- Awards: The Liberation of the City of Nis (1977)

Bratislav "Bata" Anastasijević (18 April 1936, Niš, Serbia, Yugoslavia – 12 October 1992, Niš) was a university music professor, pianist, composer, conductor, ethnomusicologist, leader of vocal quartets, quintets, sextets, octets. He also conducted the Naissus Big Band Orchestra. His innovations in music style and genre contributed significantly and permanently to the development of jazz music, stage music and Serbian ethno music in Yugoslavia. He was also one of the founders of the democratic party in Yugoslavia (Niš).

== Biography ==
He obtained a master's degree in Sarajevo on the topic "The Genesis and Development of Jazz in Yugoslavia" as well as the master's degree at the Conservatoire Royal de Musique in Liège, Belgium on the topic "Modern Music". He was a scholar of the Belgian Royal Government. He was the founder of one of the oldest International Jazz Festivals in Yugoslavia (Serbia), Naissus Jazz Festival (7 June 1979, the first such festival having been held in 1981), the Naissus Jazz Club Nis, the Association of Jazz Musicians and Entertainment Music of Serbia, Nis.

Bratislav Anastasijevic won prizes The Liberation of the City of Nis (1977), The Celebrity Award of Serbia (1978), and The Celebrity Award of Yugoslavia (1989); however, the prize for the original music Bolani Dojcin which he won at the Theatre Festival Joakim Vujic in 1975, marked a new era of criterion-referenced evaluation of stage and theatrical music in Serbia. At the same festival, he won two prizes for stage music in 1979 and 1981. Moreover, he was awarded the prize for stage music Tik Tak in Braunschweig, (Germany). Bratislav Anastasijevic in the early sixties brought one of the greatest pianists Sviatoslav Richter to perform in Serbia, city of Nis, violinist Leonid Kogan and Bolshoi Theatre from Moscow.

Musical works of classical music: Ballads of Southeast Serbia (No.1 E minor; No.2 F sharp minor; No.3 G major; No.4 C sharp minor; No.5 G minor); Dances: Dance of Serbia; Dance of Yugoslavia; Dance of Cair. He was one of the organizers of October Music Festival (NIMUS), Film Festival in Nis, and rock festivals in Serbia.

Bratislav Anastasijevic published two books, one in 1988 on the abuse of Serbian folk music, another called Ogledi O Dzezeu in 1990. He also issued publications on classical, jazz, and Serbian folk music.

The Bata Anastasijevic prize has been given to Yildiz Ibrahimova 1995, Bora Rokovic 1998, Hans Theessink 1999, Jimmy Cobb, Reggie Workman, Stjepko Gut 2001, Theodosii Spassov 2002, Ewald Oberleitner 2003, Miles Lloyd Griffith 2004, Philip Catherine 2005, Denise Jannah 2005, Billy Cobham 2006, Donald Byrd 2007, Stochelo Rosenberg trio 2008, Randy Brecker 2009, Benny Golson 2010, Tony Sciacca, Barry Altschul, Belgrade Jazz Orchestra 2017, Tomas Lopez-Perea Cruz 2018, Alvin Queen 2018, Antoni Dontschew, Hannes Beckmann, and Vojislav Simić.
