= Józef Wieniawski fund =

Donation

The Józef Wieniawski collection is a donation made to the Royal Conservatory of Brussels by his oldest daughter, Elisabeth Wieniawska (1892–1978), of a collection of autograph scores from the composer.

== The Wieniawski brothers ==
Born into a cultivated Jewish Polish family, from a renowned surgeon father and a musician mother, the brothers Henryk Wieniawski (1835–1880) and Józef Wieniawski (1837–1912) benefit very early on from an education stimulating their artistic development.

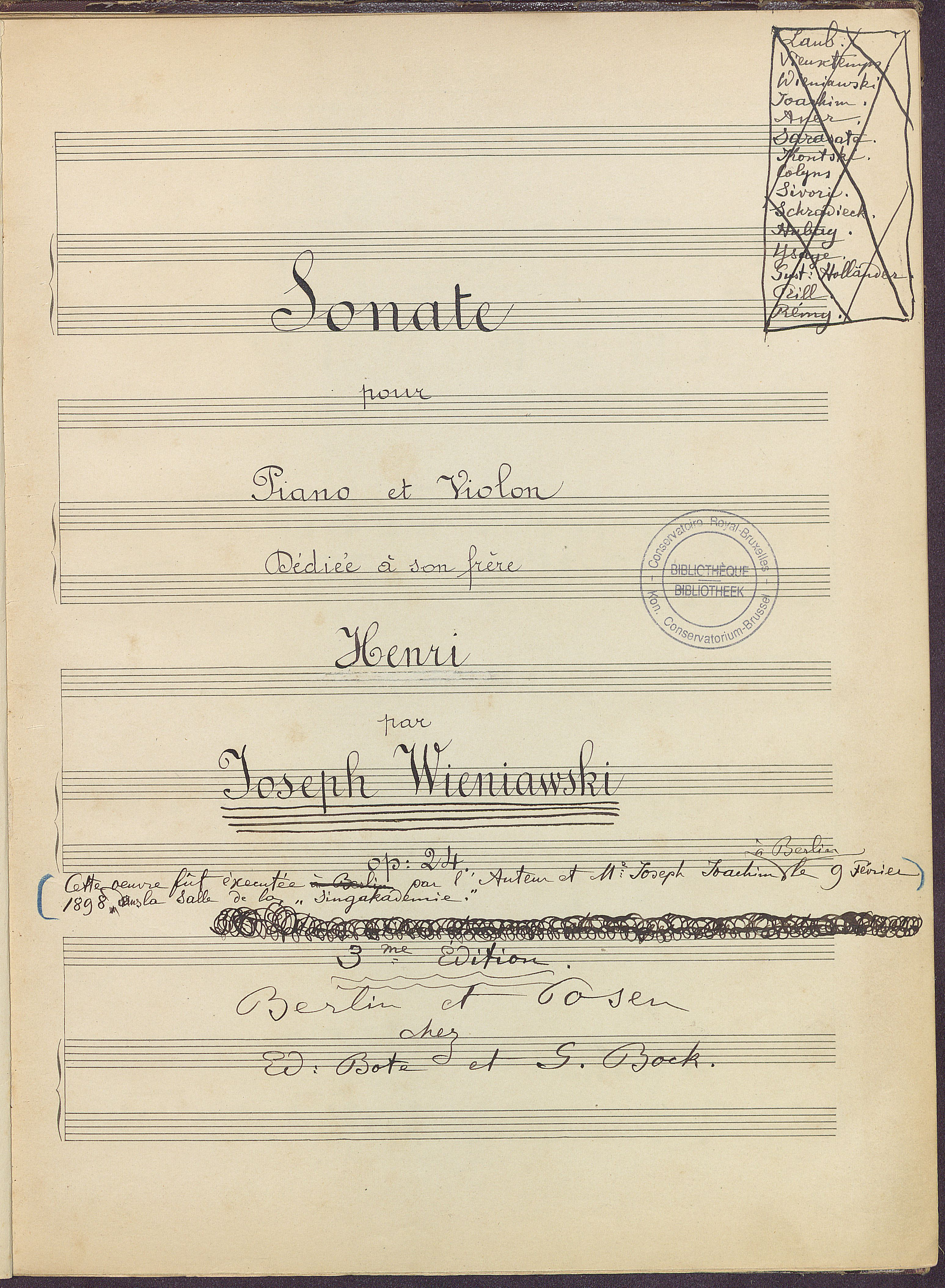
J. Wieniawski, title page of the Sonata for piano and violin (op. 24) dedicated to his brother Henryk (Library of the Royal Conservatory of Brussels, B-Bc, FC-3-W-019/1)

While Henryk, violin prodigy in the footsteps of Henri Vieuxtemps, Joseph Joachim or Pablo de Sarasate, develops a brilliant career as Konsertmeister, pedagogue and composer, his younger brother Józef, student of Pierre Zimmerman, Antoine-François Marmontel and Charles-Valentin Alkan at the Paris Conservatoire, subsequently of Franz Liszt in Weimar, becomes renowned as a brilliant pianist. Pursuing a pedagogic activity at the Russian Musical Society and at the Moscow Conservatory, he settles in Brussels where he consolidates his virtuoso reputation, especially of Chopin's work. He dies in Brussels, thirty years later, in 1912.

== The collection ==
If Henryk's compositions hold a primary place in the violin repertory of the XIX^{e}s. next to works of Paganini, Ernst, Vieuxtemps and Sarasate, the romantically inspired opus from Józef – more prolific than his brother – is almost forgotten today, much to his discredit. However, the oldest daughter of the musician, Elisabeth Wieniawska (1892–1978), experienced violinist and cellist, has donated to the Royal Conservatory of Brussels, the totality of the archives of her father in their original state – a precious and unique lot of handwritten and printed scores of piano, chamber, orchestral or vocal music.

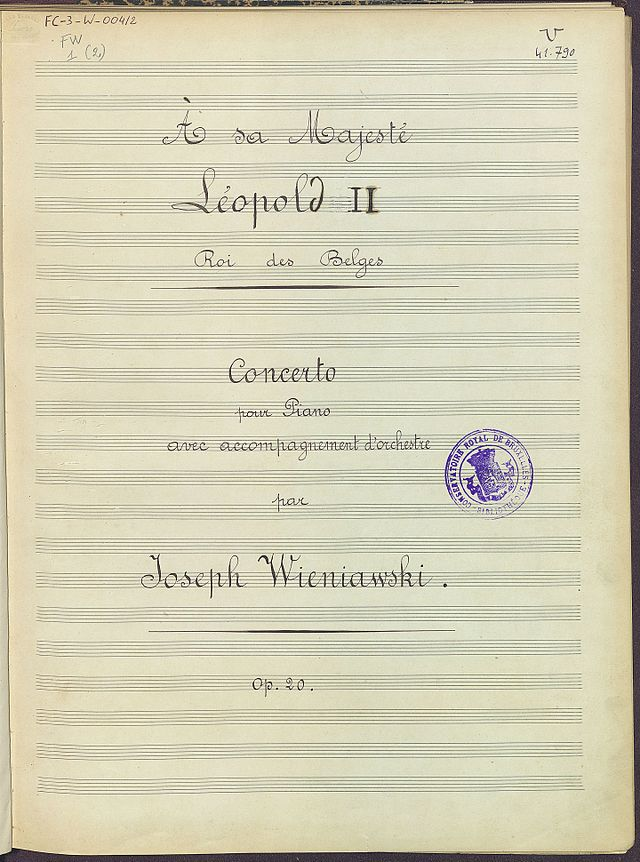
J. Wieniawski, title page of the Concerto for piano and orchestra (op. 20), dedicated to Leopold II, king of Belgium (Library of the Royal Conservatory of Brussels, B-Bc, FC-3-W-004/5)

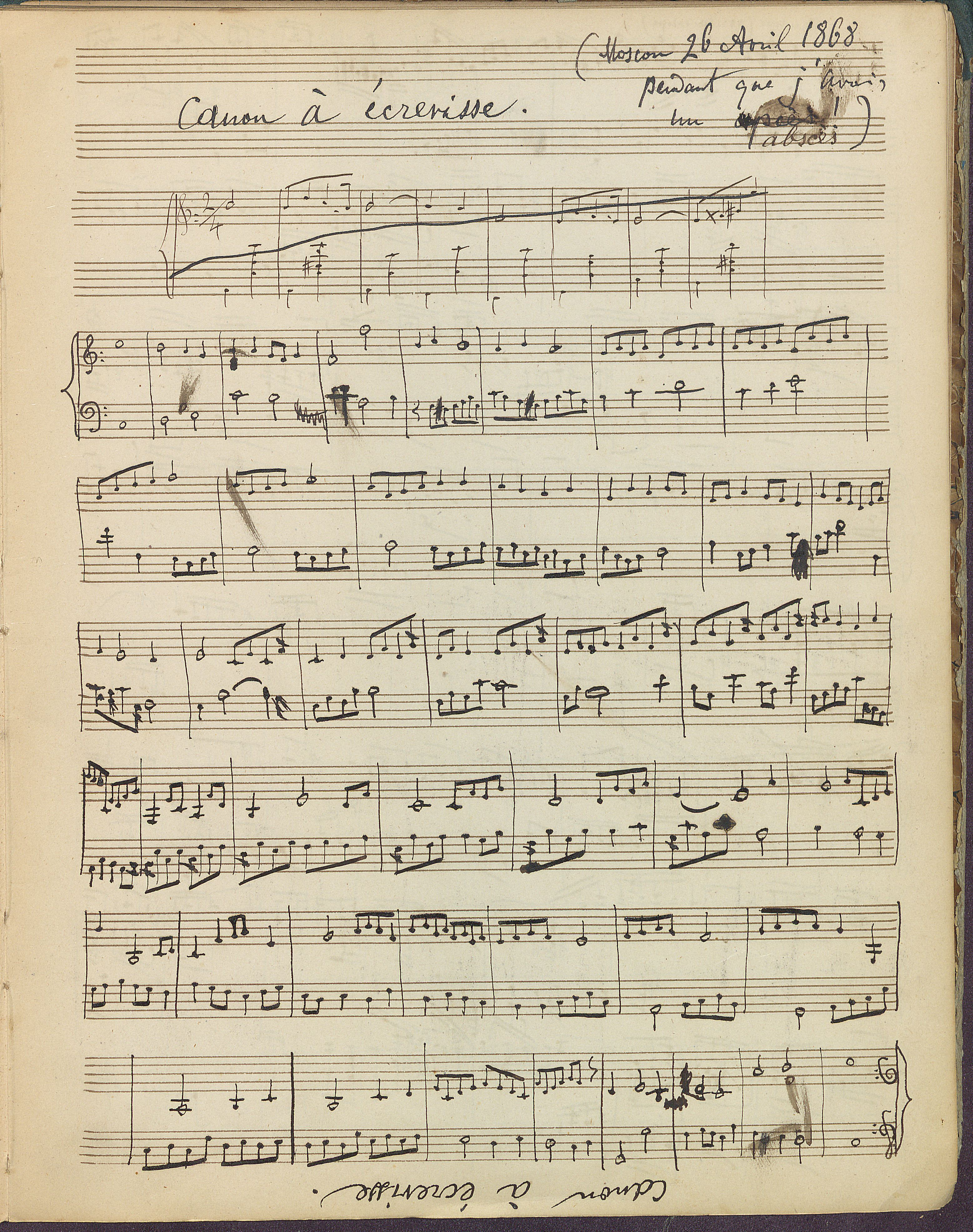
J. Wieniawski, Canon à écrevisse pendant que j'avais un abcès, Moscow, April 26, 1868 (Library of the Royal Conservatory of Brussels, B-Bc, FC-3-W-005/6)

These 38 pieces – sketches, autograph manuscripts or copies – with non-negligible historical value and of which some were never published, often include marks revealing the composer's creative process. They not only shed light on the individuality of the musician, but also on the environment in which he evolved, as well as on the interpretation practices of the 19th century. His annotated Piano Concerto op. 20, vowed to the Leopold II of Belgium, his mazurkas, marches, chants created for some European high society personalities or musicians such as Rossini and Saint-Saëns, or even his Sonata for violin and piano op. 24, dedicated to his brother Henryk and « executed by the Author and Mr. Joseph Joachim in the Berliner Singakademie on February 9th » are eloquent proofs in this regard. In his Canon à écrevisse pendant que j'avais un abscès, he cries out his occasional ill-being with a moving touch.

The Wieniawski collection also contains many prints with annotations (places and dates of performance and/or names of interpreters), such as the aforementioned op. 20, the Suite romantique op. 41, the Symphony in D major op. 49 or the dramatic ouverture of William the Taciturn op. 43, for all of which a score, a piano reduction and, for the latter, separate orchestra parts and a piano version for four hands are available.

In general and because of the multitude of unexplored sources, this collection is a useful source for research on the musician and his entourage for musicologists.

== Appendix ==
=== Bibliography ===
- A.G. Piotrowska, « Józef Wieniawski (1837–1912) and his Works Composed in Brussels », Revue Belge de Musicologie, n° 60, 2006, pp. 85–97.

=== External links ===
- Koninklijk Conservatorium Brussel (English)
- Conservatoire Royal de Bruxelles (French)
- Royal Conservatory of Brussels library catalog
- Royal Conservatory of Brussels library catalog - Józef Wieniawski
