= Julien Ghyoros =

Belgian composer and conductor

Julien Ghyoros was a Belgian composer and orchestral conductor. He was born as Julien Gogos on 18 November 1922 in Liège, Belgium, a son of Jeanne Dehairs and Konstantinos Gogos. He used the name Julien Ghyoros for professional purposes, and in 1969, he adopted it as his legal name. He died on 9 August 1978 in Brussels at the age of 55.

== Biography ==
=== Early life and education ===
Born from a Belgian mother and an American father of Greek origin (Alexandria, Egypt), he grew up in his native city where he was a chorister up to the age of 13 at the Liège Opera and studied Cello, Harmony, Counterpoint, Fugue, and the Art of Conducting an Orchestra.

=== Family life ===
In 1958 he married Nora Van Moerbeke (1937-2018); together they had three children: Gregory (1959), Patricia (1961) and Nicolas (1974).

=== Musical maturity ===
At the age of 24 he composed the "American Rhapsody" (in memory of his father he never knew) as well as "Rocking child song particularly soft". For many years he conducted the Opera of Liège as well as the International Musical Youth Orchestra. Most of his life was dedicated to Opera and Chamber music.

=== Teaching ===
As professor at the Conservatoire royal de Liège and later at the Conservatoire royal de Bruxelles he taught Harmony, Counterpoint, Fugue, Orchestra classes, and the Art of Conducting to students from Belgium and other countries.

=== Final years and death ===
A few years before dying, he composed the "Sonate d'Irchonwelz", a viola concerto for his wife who was viola soloist at the National Orchestra of Belgium, as well as some piano pieces called "Greg et Pat".

== Compositions ==
- Rhapsodie américaine
- Rocking child song particularly soft
- Greg et Pat
- Conte à l'enfant au berceau
- Concerto d'Athènes: pour alto et piano
- Ballada pour violon et piano
- Sonate d'Irchonwelz: en trois mouvements
