= Celia Torrá =

Argentine composer

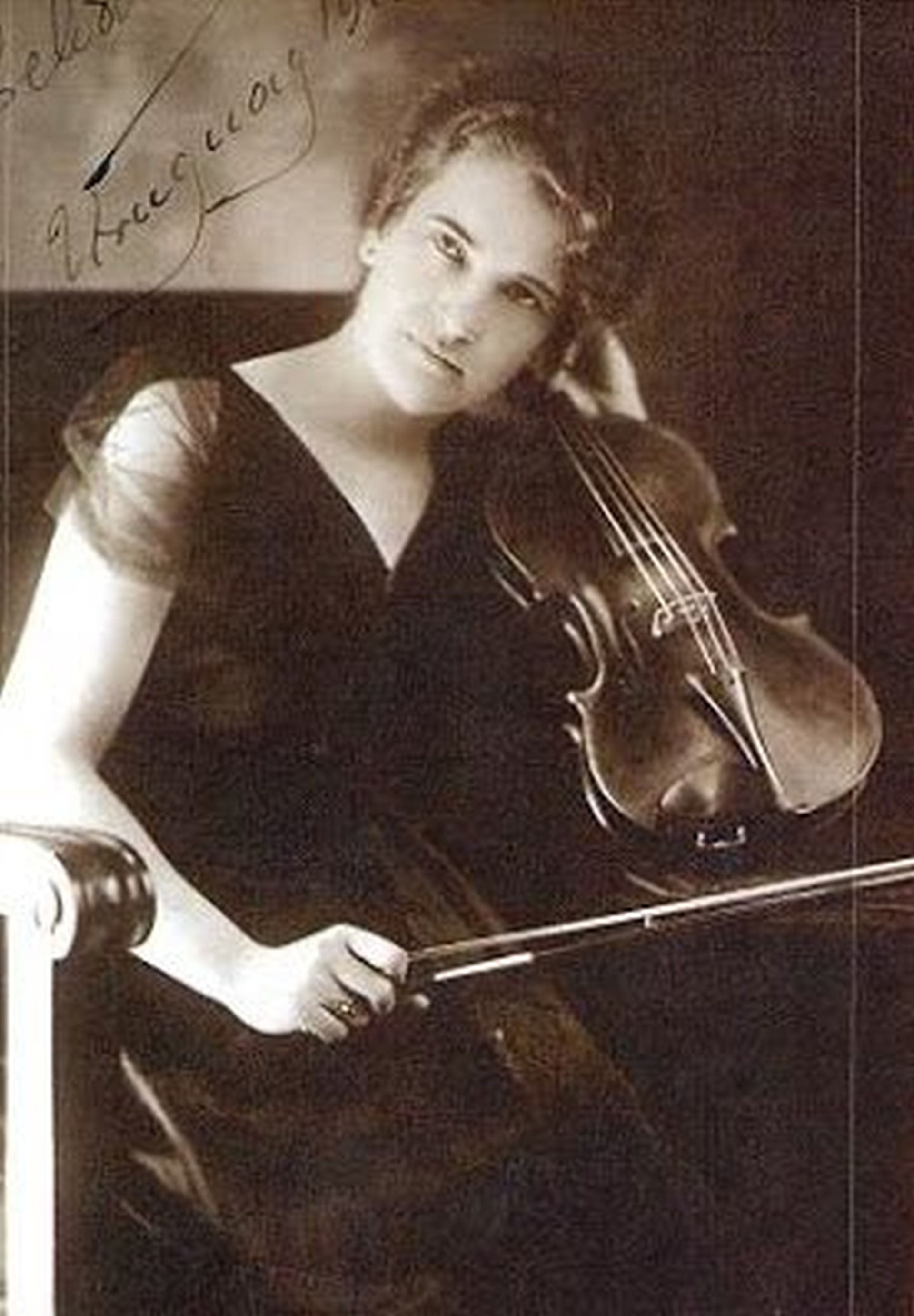
- Celia Torrá in 1925.

Background information
- Born: September 18, 1889; Concepción del Uruguay, Entre Ríos, Argentina
- Died: December 16, 1962 (aged 73)
- Occupations: Violinist, pianist, composer, orchestra director
- Instruments: Violin, piano

Celia Torrá (18 September 1889 – 16 December 1962) was an Argentine composer, conductor, and violinist. She was the first woman to conduct an orchestra at the Teatro Colón.

Torrá was born in Concepción del Uruguay, Entre Rios, Argentina. Her father was her first violin teacher. She later studied music with Andres Gaos, Athos Palma, and Alberto Williams.

In 1909, she won a National Commission of Fine Arts prize which funded her studies in Europe with Vincent d'Indy, Jenő Hubay, Zoltán Kodály, Paul Le Flem, and César Thomson. She won the Royal Conservatory of Brussels' Grand Prix for violin in 1911. The Entre Rios provincial government gave her a grant to continue her studies in Europe. She remained in France during World War I, where she gave benefit concerts for the Red Cross.

In 1921, Torrá returned to Argentina where she was the first female conductor at the Teatro Colón. In 1930, she founded and directed the Asociación Coral Femenina, which later merged with the Asociación Sinfónica Femenina.

Torrá conducted both groups in over 200 concerts. In 1952, she founded a choir for the employees of Philips Argentina S.A., the first workers choir in Argentina.

== Chamber ==
- En Piragua (violin and piano)
- Pieces (violin and piano)

== Orchestra ==
- Rapsodia entrerriana
- Suite en Tres Tiempos
- Suite Incaica
- Suite y Rapsodia Entrerriana
- Tres Piezas para Arcos (string orchestra)

== Piano ==
- Sonata

== Vocal ==
- "A la patria"
- "Abandono (Carmen latino")
- "Alborada"
- "Atardecer"
- "Cacharros y ponchitos"
- "Cantar de arriero" (text by Rafael Jijena Sánchez)
- "Capillas"
- "Changuito (Canción infantil)" (text by Adela Christensen)
- Coqueando (women's chorus and piano)
- "Crepuscula"r
- El aguila (women's chorus and piano)
- El arroyo y luna y nieve en huillapina (chorus and orchestra)
- "El sauce"
- "Himno a la paz"
- Himno a la raza (chorus and orchestra)
- "Himno del liceo"
- "La campana"
- "La gallina ponedora"
- "La señora semana"
- Las campanas (chorus; arrangement of melody by Juan Hidaldo)
- "Las palomitas"
- "Los amigos"
- "Marcha patriótica"
- "Mi reloj"
- "Milonga del destino" (Text: Fernán Silva Valdés)
- O María Virgo (women's chorus and organ)
- "Oración a la bandera"
- "Otoño"
- Pampeana (male chorus)
- "Primavera"
- "Quisiera eternizarme"
- "Seis Coplas"
- Tota pulchra (women's chorus and organ)
- "Vida, vidita" (Text: Rafael Jijena Sánchez)
- "Visión de paz"
