= Théo Charlier =

- Born: Theophile Noel Charlier; 17 July 1868; Seraing, Belgium
- Origin: Seraing, Liège
- Died: 9 October 1944 (aged 76) Liège, Belgium
- Occupations: Musician, trumpeter, teacher
- Instrument: Trumpet
- Years active: 1886–1944

Theophile Noel Charlier (17 July 1868 – 9 October 1944), more commonly known as Théo Charlier, was a Belgian trumpeter, composer, and teacher. He was notable for preferring the trumpet during a period when the cornet was more popular.

== Career ==
Théo Charlier studied under Dieudonné Gérardy and Sylvain Dupuis at the Royal Conservatory of Liège. He played solo trumpet for the Antwerp Symphony Orchestra and at La Monnaie in Brussels, Belgium. On 17 April 1898, he performed Brandenburg Concerto No. 2 by Johann Sebastian Bach in Antwerp. This was the first performance of the piece on a modern piccolo trumpet. He was appointed as a trumpet teacher to the Liège Conservatory in 1901. He was the founder of the Schola Musicae institute for higher musical education. He frequently collaborated with Victor-Charles Mahillon to develop a sopranino trumpet in high G and a "Charlier model" B♭ trumpet.

== Influence ==
The Theo Charlier International Trumpet Solo Competition was held in 2005, 2015, and 2019 in Charlier's home country of Belgium. Charlier wrote Solo de Concours in 1900, and it is still performed to this day. By far, his most famous work is 36 Études Transcendantes (Thirty-six Transcendental Etudes), a staple in trumpet instruction.
