= Jean-Lucien Hollenfeltz Fund =

The Jean-Lucien Hollenfeltz collection consists of the private collection of physician, humanist, and scholarly musician Jean-Lucien Hollenfeltz, which is held by the Royal Conservatory of Brussels. The collection contains books and musical documents from Constanze Mozart (1762–1842) and her youngest son, Franz Xaver Wolfgang Mozart (1791–1844).

== Biography ==
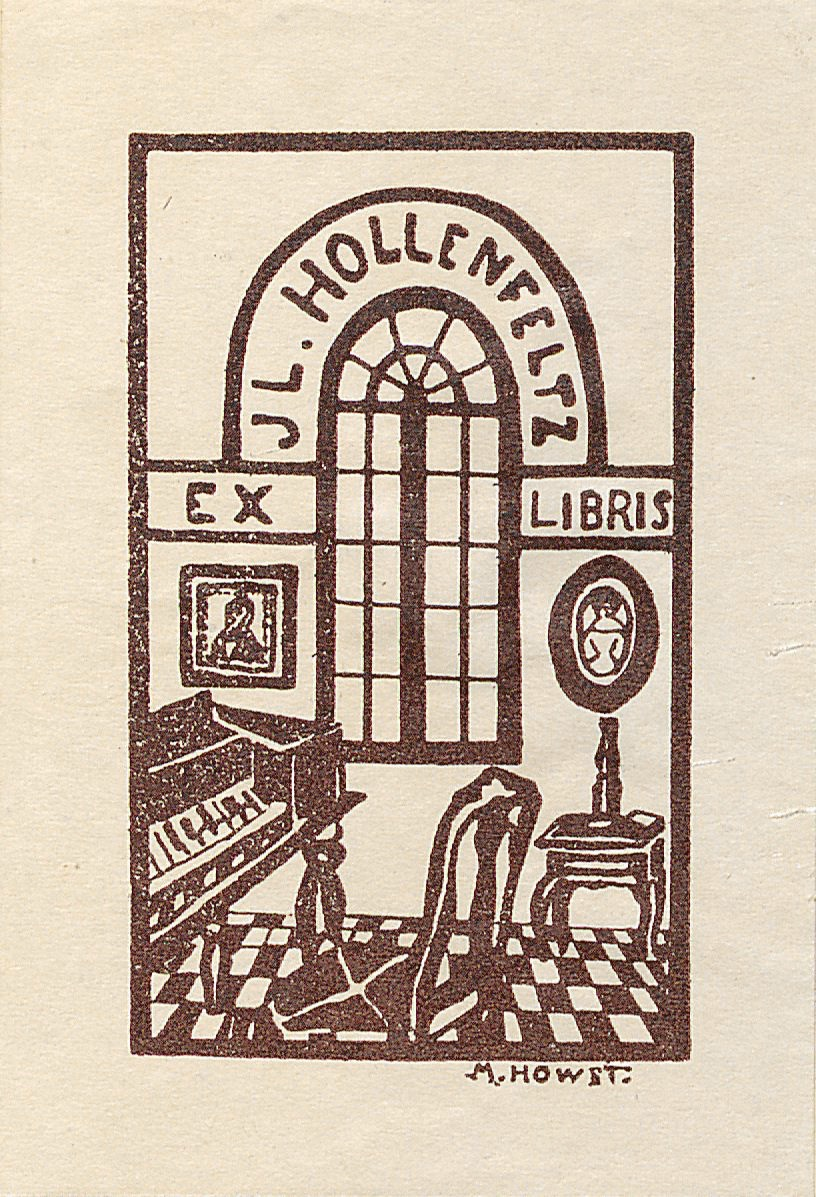
Ex-Libris from J.-L. Hollenfeltz

Born in Arlon in 1898, Hollenfeltz was involved in the resistance movement of WWII, at the end of which he was assassinated close to his home by German soldiers. This GP, provincial president of the International Red Cross, was also a historian, an archaeologist and a musicologist, interested in 18th century music, specifically in Mozart and his circle.

A member of associations such as the International Musicological Society, the Société Française de Musicologie or the Société d'études mozartiennes, he fostered musical life in his hometown and maintained relations with musicologists specialised in subjects related to the Austrian composer.

In April 1944, knowing his days counted, he donated a major part of his private collection to the library of the Royal Conservatory of Brussels.

== The collection ==
The comprehensive musicological Hollenfeltz collection, consisting of 425 documents and including many ancient and high-value unpublished pieces, includes musicological reviews and works, bibliographical editions, studies and biographic notes, as well as original scores and autograph manuscripts. It also holds 73 original scores from Hollenfeltz himself, initially written for performance at the "La Renaissance" concerts he organised and directed in his home town. The collection was catalogued electronically by the Flemish Brussels Conservatory (Koninklijk Conservatorium Brussel).

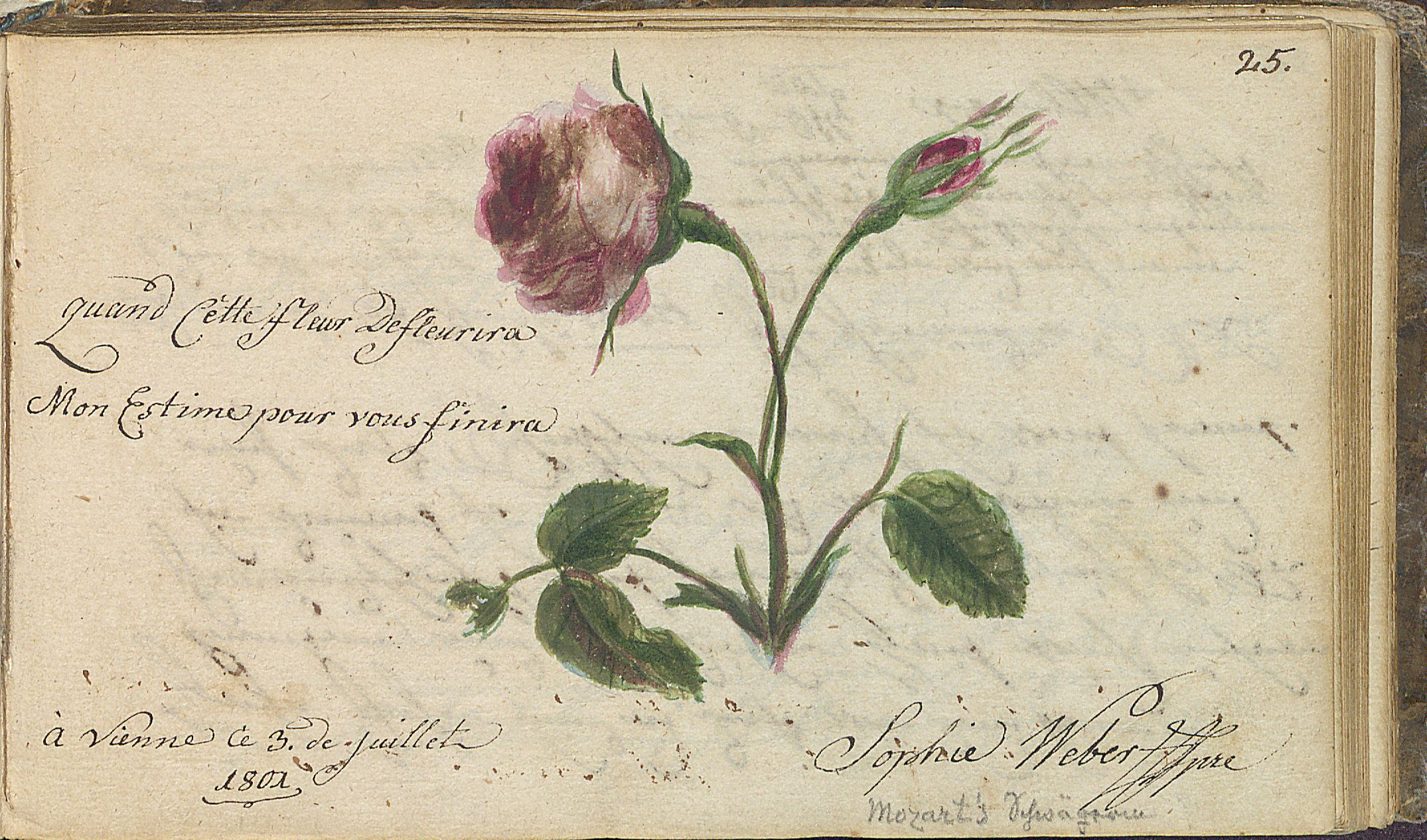
A page from the Album de Souvenirs of Constanze Mozart (Library of the Royal Conservatory of Brussels, B-Bc, FH-163)

The crown jewel of this compilation is the Album de souvenirs from Constanze Mozart – a small oblong manuscript in 8° format of 166 pages, dated 1789 but covering the 1801–1823 period, carefully bound, occasionally illustrated, containing reflexions, poems or impressions in German, French, Italian or Latin on the theme of friendship.

Next to this unicum, the collection contains a handwritten travel diary of nearly 300 pages from her son, Franz Xaver Wolfgang Mozart, along with autograph letters of the latter between 1802 and 1843 to his mother, his brother Karl Thomas Mozart, his stepfather Georg Nikolaus von Nissen and several editors in Leipzig, including Carl Friedrich Peters or Breitkopf & Härtel.

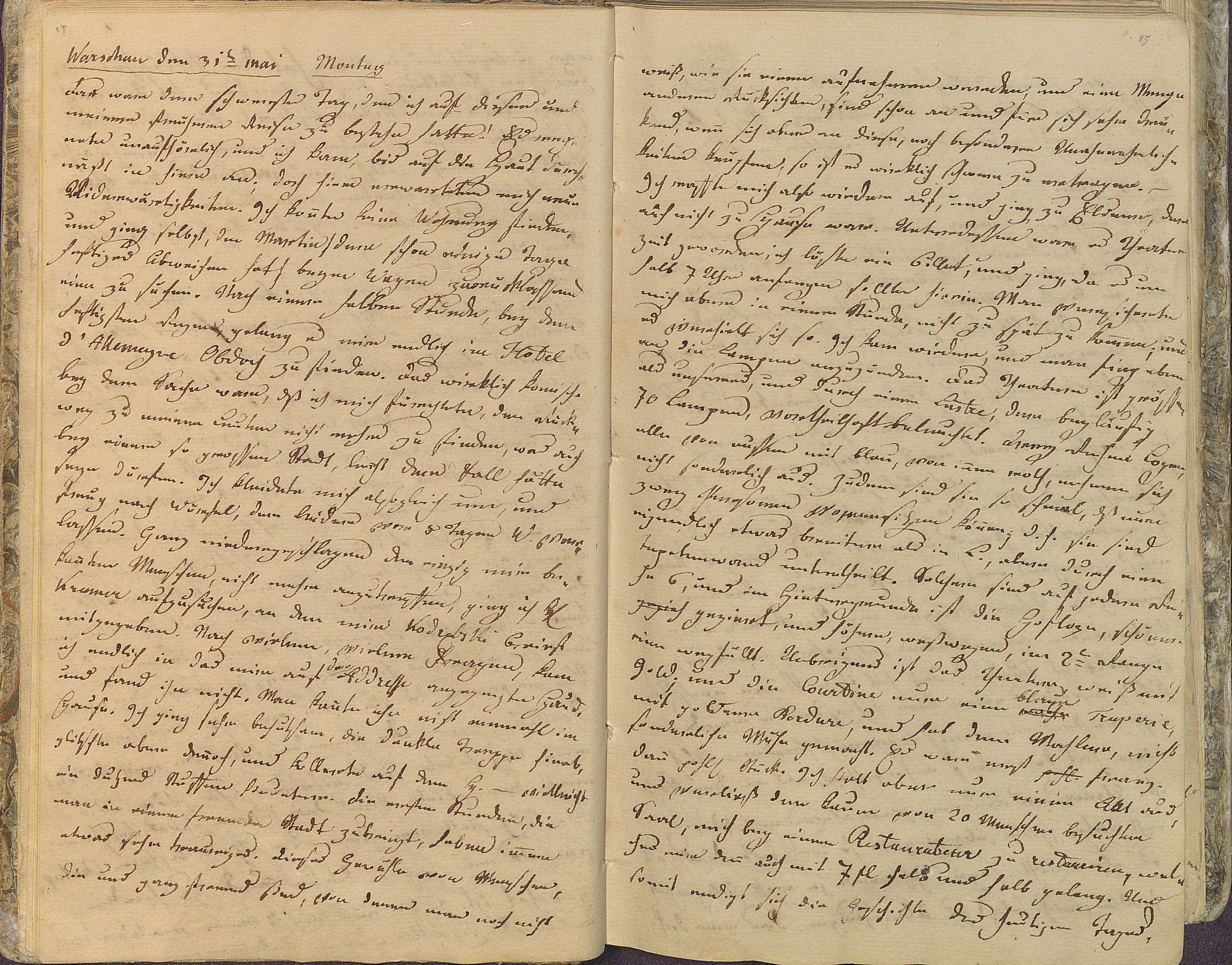
Two pages from de Travel Diary of Franz Xaver Wolfgang Mozart (Library of the Royal Conservatory of Brussels, B-Bc, FH-162)

In addition, this collection contains some 20 prints of currently forgotten works from F.X.W. Mozart (1791–1844), such as the Rondo for pianoforte in F major of 1802, of which the first 16 measures were written and abandoned by his father.

This collection also holds an iconography of engravings, lithographs and, occasionally, photos.

== Appendix ==
=== Bibliography ===
- Annuaire du Conservatoire royal de musique de Bruxelles, 67e année, 1944.
- "Jean-Lucien Hollenfeltz (1898–1944): Les différents visages du plus grand humaniste arlonais du XXe siècle", Bulletin trimestriel de l'Institut Archéologique du Luxembourg-Arlon, 89e année, n°12, 2013.
- Roger Brucher, Arlon et ses musiques, 1834–1958. Un inventaire, une écoute. La vie musicale en province du Luxembourg, Arlon-Bruxelles, Editions de l'Académie Luxembourgeoise, 1971.

=== External links ===
- Koninklijk Conservatorium Brussel (English)
- Conservatoire Royal de Bruxelles (French)
- Royal Conservatory of Brussels library catalog
- Royal Conservatory of Brussels library catalog – Constanze Mozart
- Royal Conservatory of Brussels library catalog – Franz Xaver Mozart
