= Pro Arte Quartet =

The Pro Arte String Quartet is a string quartet founded in Belgium, which became affiliated with the University of Wisconsin-Madison in 1941.

== History ==
=== Origins 1912-1941 ===
The Pro Arte String Quartet was founded by Alphonse Onnou in Brussels in 1912. After becoming the Court Quartet to Queen Elizabeth of Belgium, the quartet began the first of many international tours in 1919. After the First World War it became famous for the performance of modern music and for its extensive recordings of Haydn. The composers Bartók, Milhaud and Honegger entrusted to the ensemble new works to premiere. The Pro Arte Quartet made its American debut in 1926 in New York and returned for 30 tours to the United States, often under the auspices of the chamber music patron Elizabeth Sprague Coolidge. It performed at the inauguration of the Hall of Music at the Library of Congress in Washington, DC. In 1932 it was named the "Quatuor de la Cour de Belgique". Its first visit to Madison, Wisconsin was in 1938. Two years later, the musicians were stranded in Madison by the German invasion of Belgium in World War II and accepted a residency at the University of Wisconsin–Madison, the first such residency at a major American university.

The Royal Conservatory of Brussels holds a comprehensive collection of autograph and printed Second Violin scores from Laurent Halleux, who joined the Pro Arte Quartet when he was only fifteen and stayed with the group till 1943. It sheds light on the works performed by the quartet, especially from American composers from the early 20th century such as Aaron Copland, Roy Harris or Louis Gruenberg.

=== 1941-1947 ===
While touring in Wisconsin in 1941 they were offered a permanent residency. In 1944, following the disbanding of the Kolisch Quartet, Rudolf Kolisch took up leadership of the Pro Arte in 1944, combined with a Wisconsin Professorship. In 1946, Robert Maas became the original cellist in the newly formed Paganini Quartet. In 1947, violist Germain Prevost, the last of the original members, resigned. In the late 1950s, the Pro Arte Quartet became members of the University's School of Music faculty in addition to being artists-in-residence.

=== Centennial anniversary commissioning project 2011-2012 ===
The Pro Arte Quartet reached its centennial anniversary in 2012. To honor this occasion, the quartet embarked on a commissioning project to include up to eight new works, presented throughout the 2011-2012 season.

== Personnel ==
The original personnel of the Pro Arte Quartet were:

1st violin: Alphonse Onnou
2nd violin: Laurent Halleux
viola: Germain Prévost
violoncello: Fernand-Auguste Lemaire

The current personnel are:

1st violin: David Perry
2nd violin: Suzanne Beia
viola: Sally Chisholm
violoncello: Parry Karp

== Recordings ==
(78 rpm recordings (Victor/His Master's Voice) of the original Pro Arte up to 1936:- )

- Bartók: Quartet no 1 in A minor op 7 (V 8842-5/DB 2379-82).
- Bloch: Piano Quintet, with Alfredo Casella (V 7874-7/DB 1882-5).
- Borodin: Quartet no 2 in D major (V 8609-12/DB 2150-3).
- Brahms: Quartet no 1 in G minor op 25 (V 8444-7/DB 1813-6).
- Brahms: Sextet no 1 in B flat major op 18, with Alfred Hobday and Anthony Pini (DB 2566-9).
- Debussy: Quartet in G minor op 10 (1893) (DB 1878-81).
- Dvořák: Piano Quintet in A major op 81, with Artur Schnabel (V 8305-8/DB 2177-80).
- Franck: Quartet in D major (V 8630-5/DB 2051-6).
- Mozart: Piano quartet no 1 in G minor K 478 with Artur Schnabel (V8562-5/Db 2155-8).
- Mozart: String Quintet in C major K 515 with Alfred Hobday (V 8712-5/DB 2383-6).
- Mozart: String Quintet in G minor K 516 with Alfred Hobday (V 7865-8/DB 2173-6).
- Ravel: Quartet in F major (DB 2135-8).
- Schubert: String Quintet in C major op 163 with Anthony Pini (DB 2561-5).
- Schumann: Piano Quintet in E flat major op 44 with Artur Schnabel (V 8685-8/DB 2387-90).
- Vivaldi: Concerto Grosso no 5 in A major 'a quatre' (V 8827/DB 2148).

The Haydn Quartet Society was formed in 1932 by His Master's Voice and by 1936 the Pro Arte recorded five volumes of records available only as complete sets. The contents were:

- Volume 1: Quartets in C major op 20 no 2; C major op 33 no 3 'Bird'; G major op 77 no 1.
- Volume 2: Quartets in D major op 33 no 6; G major op 54 no 1; C major op 54 no 2; G minor op 74 no 3.
- Volume 3: Quartets in F major op 3 no 5; E flat major op 33 no 2; E flat major op 64 no 6; B flat major op 71 no 1.
- Volume 4: Quartets in E flat major op 50 no 3; C major 'Emperor' op 76 no 3; F minor op 20 no 5.
- Volume 5: Quartets in D major op 20 no 4; F major op 74 no 2; F major op 77 no 2.

== Sources ==
- R.D. Darrell, The Gramophone Shop Encyclopedia of Recorded Music (New York 1936).
- Arthur Eaglefield Hull, A Dictionary of Modern Music and Musicians (Dent, London 1924).
- John W. Barker, The Pro Arte Quartet: A Century of Musical Adventure on Two Continents (University of Rochester, New York 2017).
