= Jeanne Tordeus =

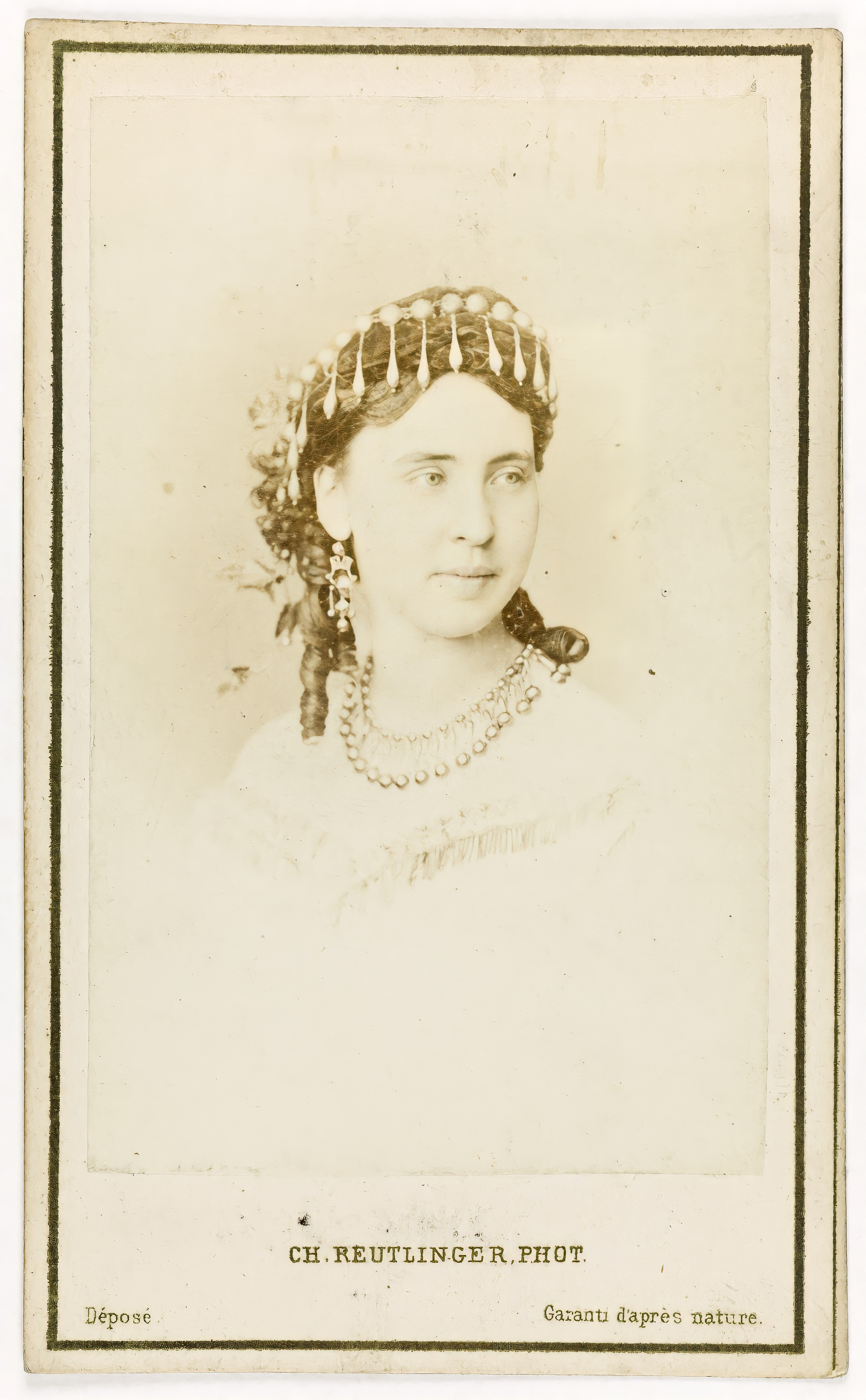
- Joan Tordeus photographed by Charles Reutlinger
- Born: December 24, 1842; Brussels
- Died: January 6, 1911 (aged 68)
- Occupation: Actress
- Parents: Michel Tordeus (father); Elise Mengoti (mother)

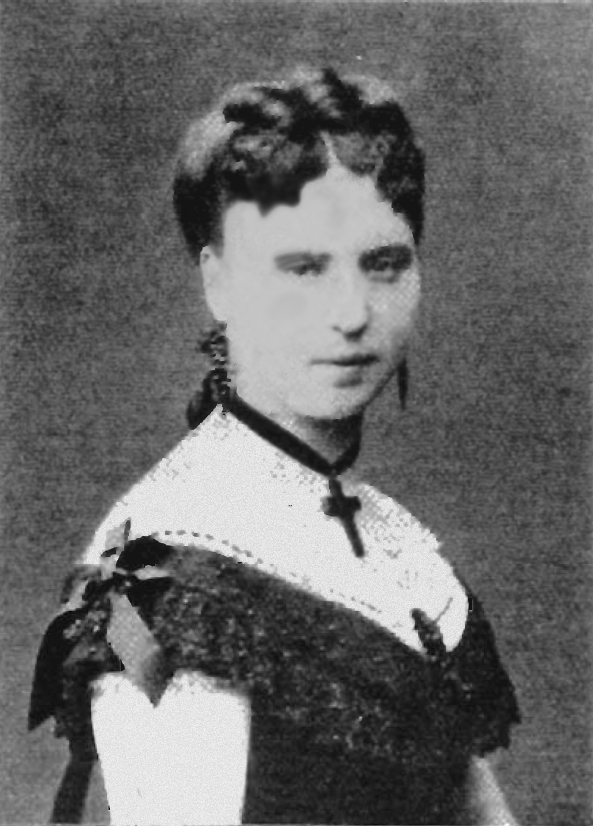
Jeanne Tordeus

Jeanne Tordeus (24 December 1842 – 6 January 1911) was a Belgian stage actress. She was the first Belgian actor active at the Comédie-Française in Paris, from 1864 to 1870. From 1872 to 1909, she was active as a professor at the conservatory in Brussels. She founded the prize for declamation which bears her name: prix Jeanne Tordeus-Adeline Dudlay (1910).

== Career ==
Discovered in 1853 by Rachel Félix due to her talent in Declamation, Tordeus was encouraged to enter the Royal Conservatory of Brussels. In 1858, she won a prize for her tragedy performances, and moved to Paris to further her training. She settled with her mother and one of her sisters on Rue Saint-Honoré, returning to Belgium during holidays.

On June 12, 1858, Jeanne auditioned for admission to the Conservatoire de Paris. She was accepted, and began to study under Jean-Baptiste Provost. On October 1859, at the encouragement of her teacher, she auditioned for the Comédie-Française. She was accepted, becoming the first Belgian actress to be admitted. She made her debut at the Odéon-Théâtre de l'Europe on March 22, 1862, portraying Chimène in Le Cid. On December of 1864, she signed a contract as pensionnaire of the Comédie-Française.

The Franco-Prussian War of 1870, followed by the Paris Commune in 1871, forced her to return to Brussels.

In 1872, François-Auguste Gevaert offered her a position teaching declamation at the Royal Conservatory of Brussels to young women. She accepted; in 1894, seeking to assist students whose accents she considered particularly poor, she published a pronunciation manual. By 1892, she had also been appointed professor of tragedy and comedy.

== Retirement and death ==
She retired in 1909. Éléonore Mahieu, one of her pupils, succeeded her in teaching.

A tribute was held in her honor at the Royal Park Theatre on February 23, 1910. Berthe Bovy and Adeline Dudlay, two of her most distinguished pupils, performed in her honor. She died on January 6, 1911, surrounded by Adeline Dudlay and Marie de Nys, another one former students.
