= Elsa Ruegger =

Swiss cellist (1881–1924)

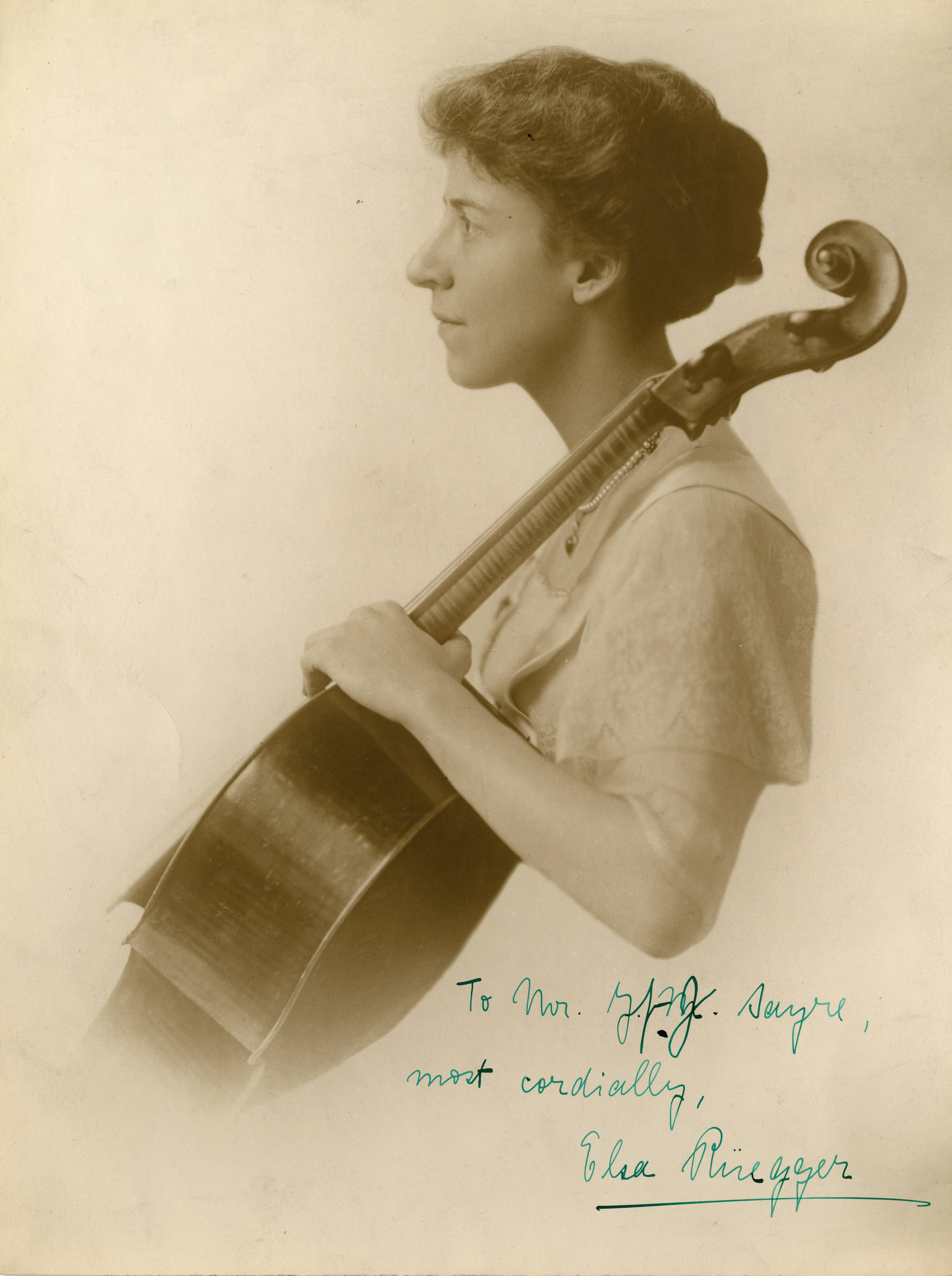
- Elsa Ruegger in a 1913 publicity photograph.
- Born: December 6, 1881; Lucerne
- Died: February 19, 1924 (aged 42); Chicago
- Other names: Elsa Ruegger-Lichtenstein (after marriage)
- Occupation: Musician (cellist)
- Years active: 1895-1924
- Relatives: Charlotte Ruegger (sister)

Elsa Ruegger (December 6, 1881 – February 19, 1924), later Elsa Ruegger-Lichtenstein, was a Swiss cellist, who was sometimes billed as "the greatest woman cellist in the world."

== Early life ==
Elsa Ruegger was born in Lucerne. Her father Julius Ruegger was a government official, and her mother was a music teacher before marriage. Her sisters Valerie (Wally) and Charlotte were also musicians. She started learning the violin as a child but switched to cello while still young. She studied with Édouard Jacobs and Anna Campowski at the Royal Conservatory of Brussels, and gave her first public concert in Brussels in 1892, at age 11.

== Career ==
Ruegger made a concert tour in Switzerland with her sisters in her teens. In 1895, she played in Berlin, and from there toured more widely as a solo artist. Her London debut came in 1897. In 1899 she was compared to American violinist Leonora Jackson. She helped her mother open a music school in Brussels in 1902.

Elsa Ruegger played with the Boston Symphony in 1903, and with the New York Philharmonic in 1907, then toured the United States performing with British tenor Cecil James, and American violinist Francis MacMillen. "Miss Ruegger possesses poetic gifts of the highest order and is blessed with the true artist temperament," declared one American reviewer in 1907.

From 1908 to 1912 she was a member of the Detroit String Quartet. She played on the American vaudeville stage from 1912 to 1921. She toured with harpist Zhay Clark in 1917 and 1918. She taught music in Brussels in 1921 and 1922. Although she was billed as "the greatest woman 'cellist in the world", she did not like the description. "I don't believe that it is possible to draw any sex line in art," she told a Detroit newspaper in 1908.

== Personal life ==
Elsa Ruegger married violinist Edmund Lichtenstein in 1908. She died in 1924, aged 42 years, in Chicago. Her gravesite is in Detroit.
