= Charlotte Ruegger =

Swiss composer (1876–1959)

Charlotte Ruegger (17 November 1876 – 16 June 1959) was a Swiss composer, conductor, violinist, and music educator who taught at several colleges in the United States. She received Belgium's Medal for Bravery for her service during World War I.

== Early life ==
Ruegger was born in Lucerne to a musical family. Her father Julius was a government official. Her mother was a music teacher, her sister Elsa Ruegger was known as the "world's best cello player", and her sister Valeria taught piano. The family moved to Belgium during Ruegger's childhood, and she graduated from the University of Brussels at age 16, although girls were not awarded diplomas at the time. She won first prize in violin at the Royal Conservatory of Music in Brussels, then continued postgraduate work in Italy at the University of Florence and in Berlin at the Stern Conservatory. Her teachers included Jean-Baptiste Colyns, Cesar Thomson (she also worked as his assistant), and Florian Zajic.

== Career ==
Ruegger presented violin recitals throughout Belgium, France, Germany, and Switzerland before going to America in 1913, where she taught violin at Oberlin Conservatory. World War I broke out while she was visiting her mother in Belgium and she stayed there, volunteering as a Red Cross nurse. She became a captain and was briefly imprisoned for distributing the underground newspaper La Libre Belgique. She was awarded Belgium's highest honor, the Medal for Bravery, for her work during World War I.

Ruegger returned to America after the war, where she was the director of the Fayetteville (North Carolina) School of Music and its violin teacher in 1920. In 1926, she was a faculty member of the summer assembly at Bay View, Michigan. She chaired the music department at Meredith College in Raleigh, North Carolina, and the violin and music theory departments at Albion College in Michigan before joining the University of Toledo (Ohio) faculty in 1933. She conducted the University of Toledo orchestra and chorus from 1935 to 1950.

== Compositions ==
Ruegger's music was published by Carl Fischer Music, Eklan-Vogel (today Theodore Presser Company), Gamble Hinged Music, and Rubank Inc. Her compositions included:

=== Chamber ===
- Air Antique (violin)
- Capriccio Brilliante (three violins and piano)
- Concertante in G Major (violin and piano)
- Etudes for Violin
- Gavotte Facile (violin and piano)
- Hungarian Caprice (violin and piano)
- Raindrops (Perpetuum Mobile) (violin and piano)
- Sonata for Violin

=== Orchestra ===
- Concerto for Violin

=== Vocal ===
- Choral works published by Gamble Hinged Music
