= Antoni Stolpe =

Polish musician

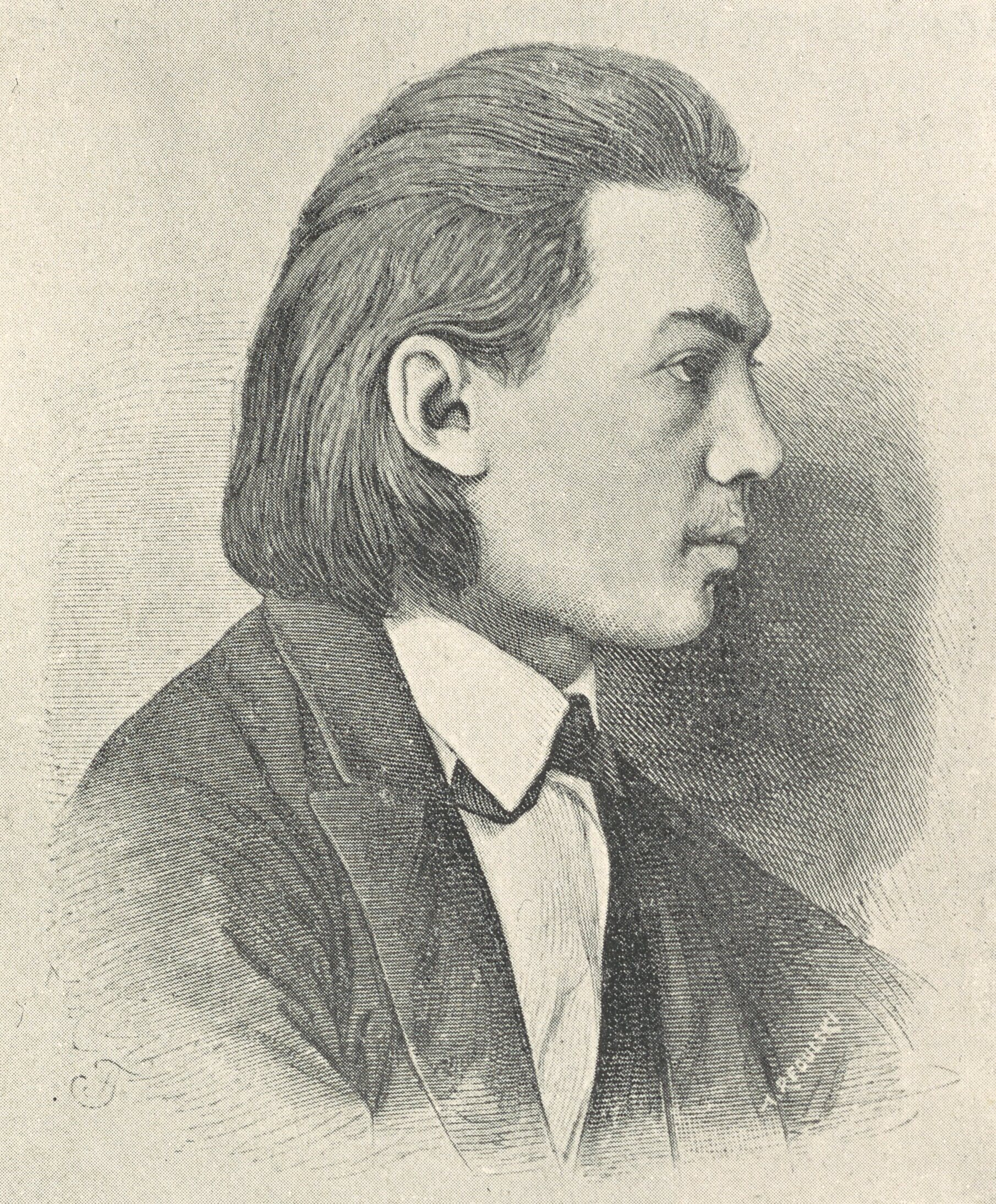
Antoni Stolpe

Antoni Stolpe (23 May 1851 – 7 September 1872) was a Polish composer and pianist.

== Life ==
Antoni Stolpe was born in Puławy, Congress Poland on 23 May 1851. He was from a musical family. His first teacher of music was his father, Edward, a pianist under whom Antoni Stolpe developed piano skills; he also studied at the Warsaw Conservatory where he simultaneously studied harmony and counterpoint with August Freyer and later with Stanisław Moniuszko. This time marks his first efforts in the field of composition, e.g. he wrote the vocal piece O Salutaris Hostia in 1866.

In 1867 the sixteen-year-old Antoni Stolpe completed his education at the Conservatory with a "grand prize" in piano and a first prize in counterpoint and in 1868–69 he gave three concerts in Warsaw, performing as a pianist and conductor. During these concerts, several of his orchestral works, chamber, piano and vocal compositions were presented. For those performances Antoni Stolpe received splendid reviews from critics as both a gifted composer and pianist.

An income from the mentioned concerts enabled him to travel in 1869 to Berlin where he studied composition and counterpoint with Friedrich Kiel and perfected his playing technique with the famous piano professor Theodor Kullak at the Neue Akademie der Tonkunst. Upon seeing his exceptional abilities, Kullak offered him the position of a piano professor at the academy. His visit to Berlin was cut short by illness, pneumonia. The family took him back to Warsaw, but unfortunately the tuberculosis that attacked the frail body of the composer was incurable at the time. Despite the family's efforts, and visits to the spa resorts of Szczawno-Zdrój and Merano, Antoni Stolpe was not cured. He died aged 21 in Merano.

After his father's death two years later, the works of the composer, whom contemporaries such as Władysław Żeleński and Zygmunt Noskowski had considered a genius comparable to Chopin, were scattered and forgotten. It was not until 2001 that musicologist Wróbel discovered Stolpe's string quartet variations in the estate of Stanisław Golachowski and presented them at the Polish Chamber Music Festival in Warsaw. The Pro Musica Camerata Foundation organized a performance of all of Stolpe's identifiable works at the Warsaw Chamber Opera, which also resulted in a three-part complete recording of his works entitled Antoni Stolpe - opera omnia.

== Compositions ==
Antoni Stolpe composed around 60 works, combining Polish musical tradition with European Romantic music. His works include, among others: Symphony in A minor (1867), concert overtures, Grand March “Hommage a Mendelssohn” for orchestra (1868), Polonaise in A flat major for piano and string quintet (1866), Dramatic Scene for cello and string quintet (1867), Piano Sextet in E minor (1867), Piano Trio (1869), Variations for string quartet, Sonata for violin and piano (1872), piano sonatas: in A minor – unfinished (1867) and in D minor (1870), Allegro appassionato in C minor (1869) and Variations in D minor (1870) for piano, piano etudes, Credo for mixed choir, string quintet and organ (1867), Song to the words by Victor Hugo for tenor and orchestra (1868), Ave Maria for contralto and string quintet (1869) and many others.

From among Stolpe's compositions only the Piano Sonata in D minor and more recently also some of the chamber music (the Piano Sextet in E minor, Dramatic Scene for cello and string quintet and Variations in G major for string quartet) were brought out in print. The other works (from which many were lost) remain in manuscript and are currently held at the Biblioteka Jagiellońska in Kraków and the Biblioteka PWM in Warsaw.

== Recordings ==
- Camerata Vistula, Jerzy Maciejewski, Anna Wróbel: Opera omnia 1; chamber music; Pro Musica Camerata PMC 039
- Stefan Łabanowski: Piano works; Acte Préalable AP0203
- Mirosław Gąsieniec: Opera omnia 2/3 – Piano works; Pro Musica Camerata PMC 060/061
- Klavierquintett-Wien: Józef Nowakowski, Zygmunt Noskowski, Antoni Stolpe; chamber music; Camerata Tokyo
