= Royal Conservatory of Liège =

Music college in Liège, Belgium

Coordinates: 50°38′05″N 5°34′15″E

- Conservatoire royal de Liège (French)
- Established: 1826
- Affiliations: Wallonie-Bruxelles Enseignement
- Location: Liège, Belgium
- Website: www.crlg.be

RCL building at 14 Rue Forgeur

The Royal Conservatory of Liège (RCL; French: Conservatoire royal de Liège) is a historic conservatory in Liège, Belgium. It is one of four conservatories in the French Community of Belgium that offer higher education courses in music and theatre.

Located at 29 Boulevard Piercot, the school's principal building was built in 1887 using a neoclassical design by architects Louis Boonen and Laurent Demany. Inside the building is a large concert hall, the Salle philharmonique de Liège, which has recently been entirely renovated. The hall is the major performance venue for the Orchestre Philharmonique de Liège.

== History ==
The RCL was founded in 1826 by King William I of the Netherlands. Joseph Daussoigne-Méhul served as the school's first director from 1827 to 1862. Jean-Théodore Radoux was director of the conservatory from 1872 to 1911.

== Notable faculty ==
- Théo Charlier
- Jeanne Demessieux
- Julien Ghyoros

== Notable alumni ==
- Bratislav Anastasijević
- Désiré Defrère
- Gaston Dethier
- Camille Everardi
- César Franck
- Frantz Jehin-Prume
- Sophie Karthäuser
- Marc Laho
- Ovide Musin
- Hasan Cihat Örter
- Jean Rogister
- Dorcy Rugamba
- Adolphe Samuel
- Caroline Samuel
- Eugène Ysaÿe
