= Royal Conservatory of Brussels =

Music college in Brussels, Belgium

- Conservatoire royal de Bruxelles (French); Koninklijk Conservatorium Brussel (Dutch)
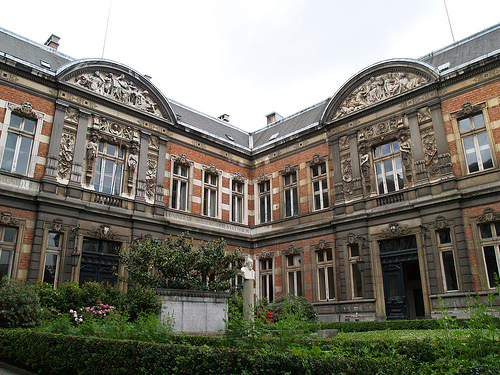
- Royal Conservatory of Brussels
- Type: Public Higher School of Arts (French-speaking entity); School of Arts under Erasmus University College (Dutch-speaking entity)
- Established: 1813 (213 years ago)
- Affiliations: WBE (French-speaking entity); EhB (Dutch-speaking entity)
- Director: Jan d'Haene (Flemish entity); Olivia Wahnon da Oliveira (French entity)
- Location: Brussels, Belgium; 50.8390°N 4.3558°E
- Website: www.kcb.be/en (Flemish entity) www.conservatoire.be (French entity)
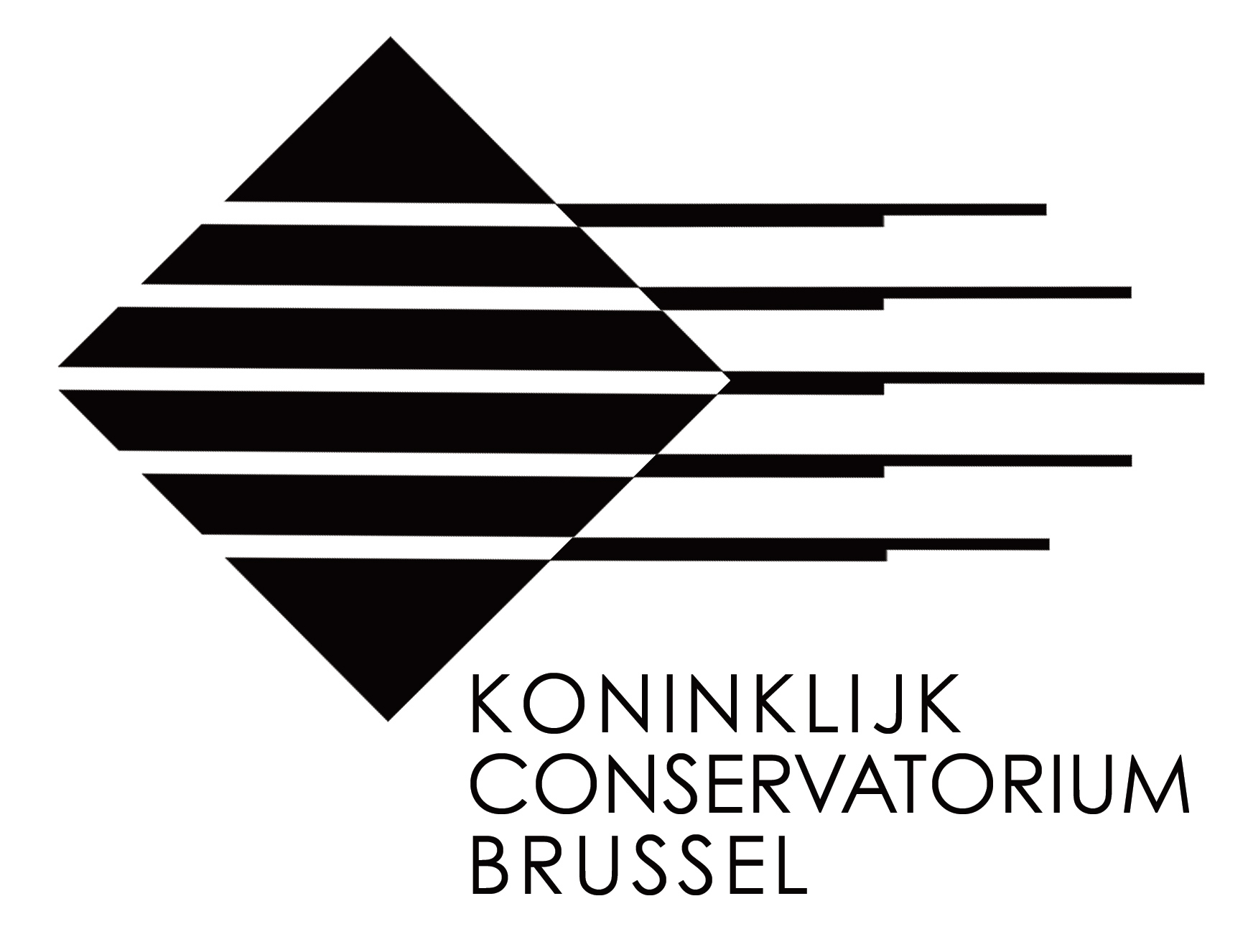
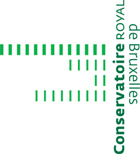

The Royal Conservatory of Brussels (French: Conservatoire royal de Bruxelles; Dutch: Koninklijk Conservatorium Brussel) is a historic conservatory in Brussels, Belgium. Starting its activities in 1813, it received its official name in 1832. Providing performing music and drama courses, the institution became renowned partly because of the international reputation of its successive directors such as François-Joseph Fétis, François-Auguste Gevaert, Edgar Tinel, Joseph Jongen and Marcel Poot, but more because it has been attended by many of the top musicians, actors and artists in Belgium, such as Arthur Grumiaux, José Van Dam, Sigiswald Kuijken, Josse De Pauw, Luk van Mello and Luk De Konink. Adolphe Sax, inventor of the saxophone, also studied at the Brussels Conservatory.

In 1967, the institution split into two separate entities: the Koninklijk Conservatorium Brussel, which teaches in Dutch, and the Conservatoire royal de Bruxelles, which continued teaching in French. While the French-speaking entity remained an independent public institution of higher education (École supérieure des arts), the Flemish entity integrated into the newly created Erasmus University College as one of its Schools of Arts.

== Building ==
The current Royal Conservatory building consists of three wings arranged around a courtyard and is the work of the Dutch architect Jean-Pierre Cluysenaar, built to his designs between 1872 and 1876. The style is neo-Renaissance, influenced by the Lescot Wing of the Louvre. The decoration of the façade is very elaborate, with five separate pediment sculptures (Instrumental Music by the Liège sculptor Adolphe Fassin, Orchestration by Charles van der Stappen, Composition by the Antwerp sculptor Frans Deckers, Performing Arts by Antoine-Félix Bouré, and Poetry by the Tournai sculptor Barthélemy Frison), as well as other incidental work including garlands, caryatids, palm trees, and musical instruments, by the sculptors Georges Houtstont, Paul de Vigne, Antoine van Rasbourg, Auguste Braekevelt, and Égide Mélot.

== Auxiliary activities ==
=== Concerts ===
Each year, a variety of regular student concerts and performances is organised by the Conservatory, boasting over hundred events and enhanced by two festivals. The right wing of the Conservatory contains a 600-seat ornate concert hall in Napoleon III style with exceptional acoustic qualities, equipped with a Cavaillé-Coll organ.

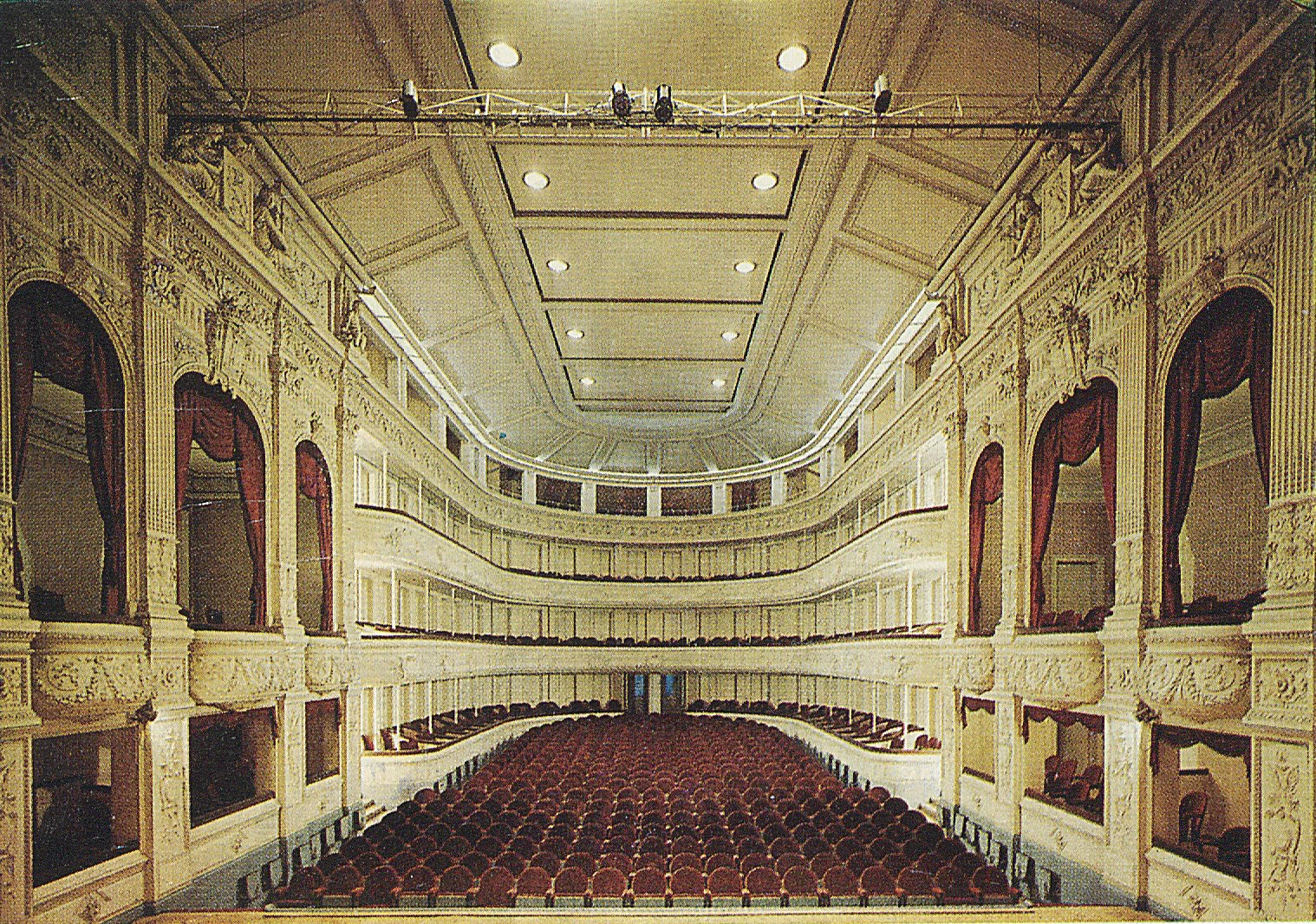
Concert hall of the Royal Conservatory of Brussels

=== Musical Instruments Museum (MIM) ===
Founded in 1877 to provide students with a practical education about ancien instruments, the Conservatory museum, currently referred to as the Musical Instruments Museum (MIM) of Brussels displays over 8,000 ancient instruments acquired by the musicologist François-Joseph Fétis, rare pieces from the initial collection, from the various funds or from new acquisitions. Since 2000, the museum, one of the most important ones of its kind, is located in the prestigious Art Nouveau building conceived in 1899 by the architect Paul Saintenoy for the former Old England department store.

=== Library ===
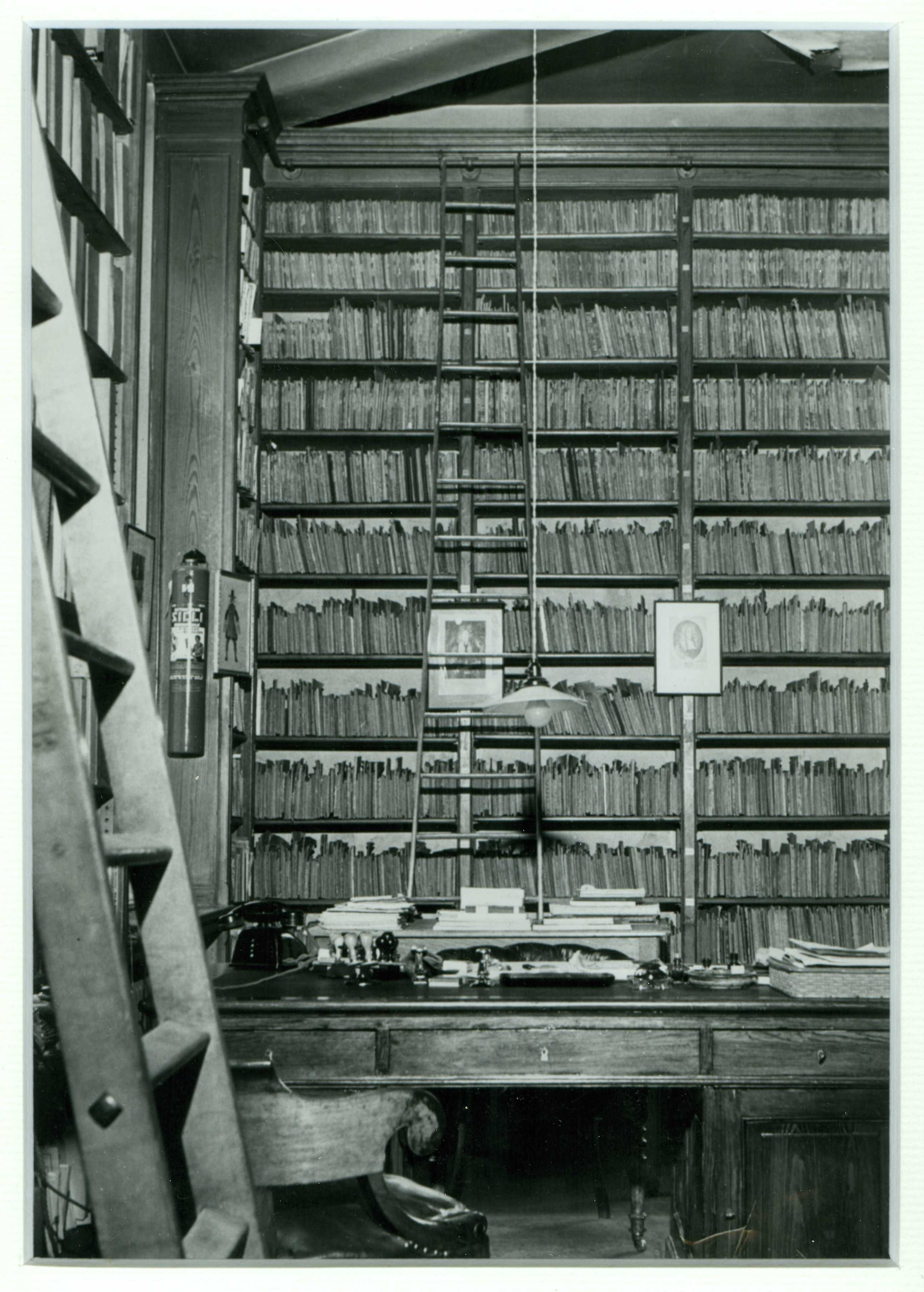
Library of the Royal Conservatory of Brussels, c. 1960

Initially created with a pedagogic aim, the Conservatory library hosts about 250,000 references, representing a scientific instrument of international resonance. It primarily consists of works about music (including more than 1,200 musical or musicological periodicals), as well as of autograph, printed or digitised (scanned) scores. There is also an important collection of more than 8,000 libretti of Italian, French or German operas from the 17th and 18th centuries, lute and guitar tablatures, several thousands of handwritten letters of musicians, iconographic documents (over 9,000 pieces), concert programmes and various types of recordings (magnetic tapes, video, 78 and 33 rpm vinyl, CD, etc.).

Next to the core collections, the library possesses several subcollections of historical importance, together forming an extensive patrimony:

- the Johann J.H. Westphal collection bought by Fétis (manuscripts of C.P.E. Bach and G.P. Telemann),
- the Guido Richard Wagener collection acquired by the librarian Alfred Wotquenne (German music from the 17th, 18th and 19th centuries, including 40 autograph manuscripts from three sons of J.-S. Bach),
- the Jean-Lucien Hollenfeltz collection (documents of Constance Mozart and her youngest son Franz Xaver Amadeus Mozart),
- the Maria Malibran collection (documents and objects from the cantatrice and her close family),
- the Edmond Michotte collection (pieces from Rossini's private library),
- the Józef Wieniawski collection (autograph scores from the pianist),
- the Laurent Halleux collection,
- the Joseph Jongen collection.

The library is open to the general public. In 2015, the library acquired the score collection of CeBeDeM (Belgian Centre for Music Documentation). In doing so, it also took over the latter's objectives in promoting Belgian contemporary music worldwide.

== Personalities linked to the Royal Conservatory of Brussels ==
=== Directors ===
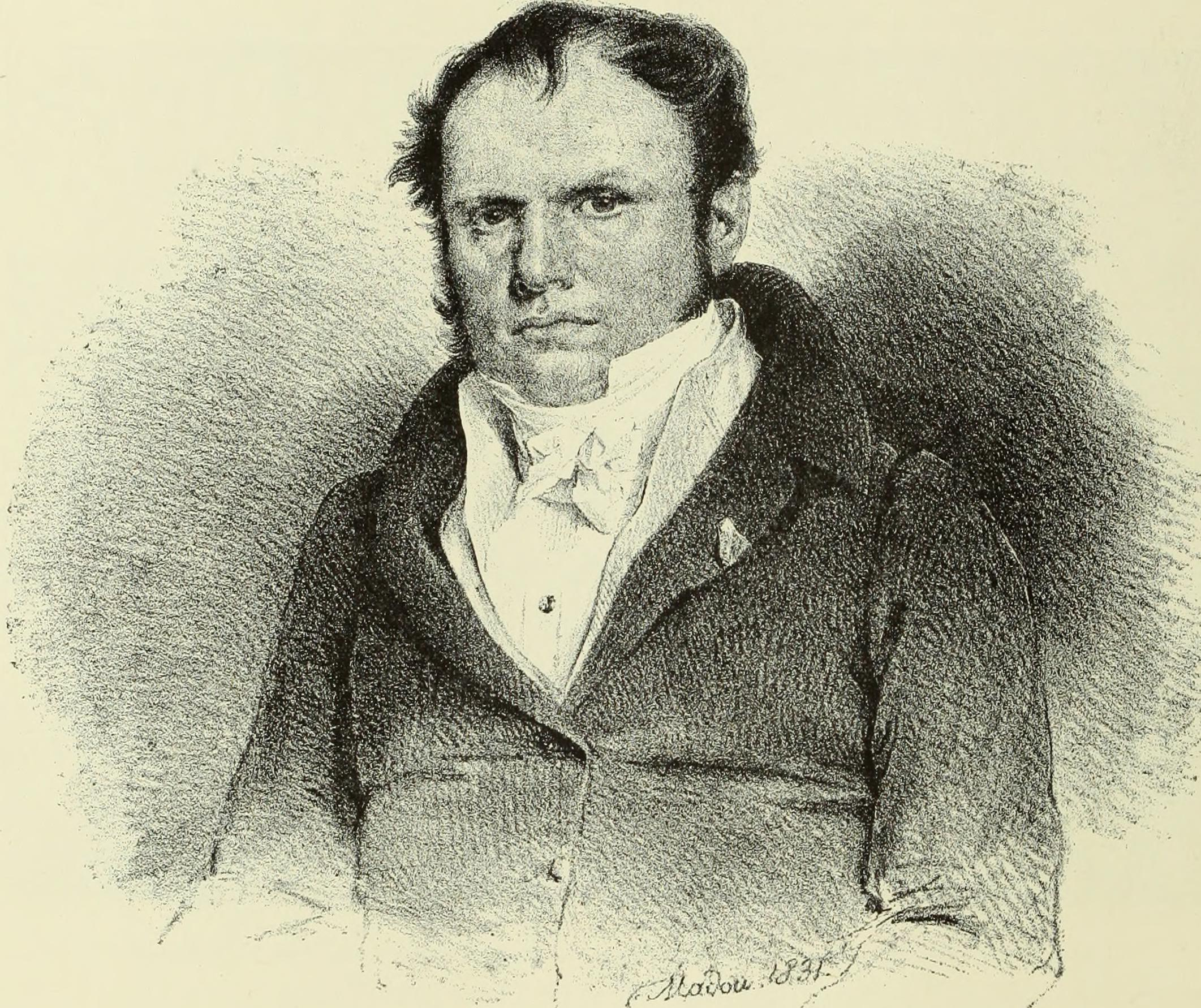
François-Joseph Fétis, first director of the Royal Conservatory of Brussels

- 1833–1871: François-Joseph Fétis
- 1871–1908: François-Auguste Gevaert
- 1908–1912: Edgar Tinel
- 1912–1925: Léon Du Bois
- 1925–1939: Joseph Jongen
- 1939–1949: Léon Jongen
- 1949–1966: Marcel Poot

==== Directors of the Conservatoire Royal de Bruxelles ====
- 1966–1973: Camille Schmit (in French)
- 1974–1987: Éric Feldbusch (in French)
- 1987–2002: Jean Baily (in French)
- 2003–2023: Frédéric de Roos (in French)
- 2023–present: Olivia Wahnon de Oliveira

==== Directors of the Koninklijk Conservatorium Brussel ====
- 1966–1994: Kamiel D'Hooghe (in Dutch)
- 1994–2004: Arie Van Lysebeth (in Dutch)
- 2004–2008: Rafael D'haene
- 2008–2017: Peter Swinnen
- 2017–2021: Kathleen Coessens
- 2021–present: Jan D'haene

=== Notable faculty ===
- Charles-Auguste de Bériot, violin
- Daniel Blumenthal (piano)
- Lola Bobesco (violin)
- François Daneels, saxophone
- Luc Devos (piano)
- Paul Dombrecht (oboe)
- François Fernandez (baroque)
- Bernard Foccroule, organ
- Julien Ghyoros, direction
- Katarina Glowicka, computer music
- Philippe Graffin, violin
- Yossif Ivanov (violin)
- Barthold Kuijken (baroque)
- Jacques Leduc (direction, composition)
- Jacques-Nicolas Lemmens, organ
- Jean Louël, piano
- Jan Michiels (piano)
- Norbert Nozy (brass band)
- Igor Oistrach (violin)
- Philippe Pierlot (baroque)
- Marie Pleyel, piano
- Eliane Reyes, piano
- Adolphe Samuel, composition
- Adrien François Servais (cello)
- André Souris (direction, composition)
- Annelies Van Parys, form analysis
- Henri Vieuxtemps, violin
- Boyan Vodenitcharov (piano)
- Henryk Wieniawski, violin
- Eugène Ysaÿe, violin
- Juliusz Zarębski, piano
- Jeanne Tordeus, (declamation)

=== Notable alumni ===
- Isaac Albéniz
- Elie Apper
- Atar Arad
- Oskar Back
- Peter Benoit
- Fabrizio Cassol
- Claire Chevallier
- Charles M. Courboin
- Alain Crépin
- François Daneels
- Lara Fabian
- Gianfranco Pappalardo Fiumara
- John Giordano
- Edwin Grasse
- Mansoor Hosseini
- Albert Huybrechts
- Anthony Jennings
- Désiré Magnus
- Alma Moodie
- Norbert H. J. Nozy
- Georgios Poniridis
- André Rieu
- Charlotte Ruegger
- Elsa Ruegger
- Noël Samyn (fr)
- Adolphe Sax
- Eloi Sylva
- Celia Torra
- José van Dam
- Carl Verbraeken
- Peter Verhoyen
- Aimée Van de Wiele
- Alfred Wotquenne
- Eugène Ysaÿe
