= List of Belgian classical composers =

This is a list of Belgian classical composers, alphabetically sorted by surname, then by other names. It includes composers of classical music who were born within Belgium (after the establishment of the country in 1830) or became permanent residents there. It also includes those living before 1830 who were born or resident within the borders of modern Belgium (see Southern Netherlands).

== A ==
- Joseph Abaco (1710–1805)
- Jean Absil (1893–1974)
- Jean-Baptiste Accolay (1833–1900)
- Emmanuel Adriaenssen (c. 1554–1604)
- Alexander Agricola (1445/1446–1506)
- Flor Alpaerts (1876–1954)
- Charles-François Angelet (1797–1832)

== B ==
- Jacobus Barbireau (1455–1491)
- Pierre Bartholomée (born 1937)
- Peter Benoit (1834–1901)
- Charles Auguste de Bériot (1802–1870)
- René Bernier (1905–1984)
- Adolphe Biarent (1871–1916)
- Gilles Binchois (c. 1400–1460)
- André-Joseph Blavier (1713–1782)
- Jan Blockx (1851–1912)
- August de Boeck (1865–1937)
- Philippe Boesmans (born 1936)
- Nicolas Bosret (1799–1876)
- Josse Boutmy (1697–1779)
- Johannes Brassart (c. 1400/1405–1455)
- Louis Brassin (1840–1884)
- Dirk Brossé (born 1960)
- Antoine Busnois (c. 1430–1492)
- Luc Brewaeys (1959–2015)

== C ==
- Peter Cabus (1923–2000) (in Dutch)
- Joseph Callaerts (1838–1901)
- Luk Callens (1965°)
- Ivan Caryll (1861–1921)
- Jean de Castro (c. 1540–1611)
- Lambert Chaumont (c. 1635–1712)
- Johannes Ciconia (c. 1370–1412)
- Jacob Clemens non Papa (c. 1510/1515 – c. 1555)
- Loyset Compère (c. 1445–1518)
- Peeter Cornet (c. 1570/1580–1633)
- Thomas Crecquillon (c. 1505–1557)
- Henri-Jacques de Croes (1705–1786)

== D ==
- Didier van Damme (born 1929)
- Daniel Danielis (1635–1696)
- Arthur De Greef (1862–1940)
- André De Groote (born 1940)
- Jean de Smetsky (1885–1945)
- Jean De Latre (c. 1505/1510–1569)
- Frédéric Devreese (1929–2020)
- Antonius Divitis (Anthonius Rycke) (c. 1470 – c. 1530)
- Leonora Duarte (1610-1678?)
- Guillaume Dufay (1397–1474)
- Henri Dumont (1610–1684)
- Albert Dupuis (1877–1967)
- Sylvain Dupuis (1856–1931)

== E ==
- Theodor Evertz (fl. c. 1554)
- Ernest van der Eyken (1913–2010)

== F ==
- François-Joseph Fétis (1784–1871)
- Jean-Joseph Fiocco (1686–1746)
- Joseph-Hector Fiocco (1703–1741)
- Jacqueline Fontyn (born 1930)
- César Franck (1822–1890)
- Pierre Froidebise (1914–1962)
- Irène Fuerison (1875–1931)

== G ==
- Frans Geysen (born 1936)
- Géry de Ghersem (1573/1575–1630)
- Matthias Vanden Gheyn (1721–1785)
- Johannes Ghiselin (Verbonnet) (fl. 1491–1507)
- Paul Gilson (1865–1942)
- Eugène Godecharle (1742–1798)
- Félix Godefroid (1818–1897)
- Lucien Goethals (1931–2006)
- Karel Goeyvaerts (1923–1993)
- Nicolas Gombert (c. 1495 – c. 1560)
- François Joseph Gossec (1734–1829)
- André Ernest Modeste Grétry (1741–1813)
- Albert Grisar (1808–1869)

== H ==
- Carolus Hacquart (c. 1640–1701?)
- Henri-Guillaume Hamal (1685–1752)
- Hayne van Ghizeghem (c. 1445 – after 1476)
- Wim Henderickx (1962–2022)
- Léonard de Hodémont (c. 1575–1639)
- Jef van Hoof (1886–1959)
- Albert Huybrechts (1899–1938)

== I ==
- Heinrich Isaac (Henricus Ysaac) (c. 1450/1455–1517)

== J ==
- Joseph Jongen (1873–1953)
- Josquin des Prez (c. 1450/1455–1521)

== K ==
- Joannes Florentius a Kempis (1635 – after 1711)
- Nicolaes a Kempis (c. 1600–1676)
- Abraham van den Kerckhoven (c. 1618 – c. 1701)
- Jacobus de Kerle (1531/1532–1591)
- Pierre Kolp (born 1969)

== L ==
- George de La Hèle (1547–1586)
- Jan Van Landeghem (born 1954)
- André Laporte (born 1931)
- Eduard Lassen (1830–1904)
- Orlandus Lassus (c. 1532–1594)
- Victor Legley (1915–1994)
- Guillaume Lekeu (1870–1894)
- Jacques-Nicolas Lemmens (1823–1881)
- Nicholas Lens (born 1957)
- Jacques Loeillet (1685–1748)
- Jean Baptiste Loeillet of Ghent (1688 – c. 1720)
- Jean-Baptiste Loeillet of London (John Loeillet) (1680–1730)
- Carolus Luython (1557–1620)

== M ==
- Jef Maes (1905–1996)
- Désiré Magnus (1828–1884)
- Pieter van Maldere (1729–1768)
- Philibert Mees (1929–2006)
- Martin-Joseph Mengal (1784–1851)
- Wim Mertens (born 1953)
- Guilielmus Messaus (1589–1640)
- Arthur Meulemans (1884–1966)
- Jérôme-Joseph de Momigny (1762–1842)
- Philippus de Monte (1521–1603)
- Lodewijk Mortelmans (1868–1952)

== N ==
- Vic Nees (1936–2013)

== O ==
- Jacob Obrecht (c. 1457/1458–1505)
- Johannes Ockeghem (c. 1410/1425–1497)
- Willy Ostijn (1913–1993)

== P ==
- Désiré Pâque (1867–1939)
- Flor Peeters (1903–1986)
- Andreas Pevernage (1542/1543–1591)
- Matthaeus Pipelare (c. 1450 – c. 1515)
- Marcel Poot (1901–1988)
- Henri Pousseur (1929–2009)

== Q ==
- Marcel Quinet (1915–1986)

== R ==
- Jean-Théodore Radoux (1835–1911)
- Godfried-Willem Raes (born 1952)
- Jean Rogister (1879–1964)
- Mateo Romero (Mathieu Rosmarin) (c. 1575–1647)
- Cipriano de Rore (1515/1516–1565)
- Jean-Baptiste Roucourt (1780–1849)
- Pierre de la Rue (c. 1452–1518)
- Joseph Ryelandt (1870–1965)

== S ==
- Jacques de Saint-Luc (1616 – c. 1710)
- Maurice Schoemaker (1890–1964)
- Philippus Schoendorff (1558–1617)
- Adrien François Servais (1807–1866)
- Jean-Baptiste Singelée (1812–1875)
- André Souris (1899–1970)
- Daniel Sternefeld (1905–1986)
- Johannes de Stokem (c. 1445 – 1487 or 1501)

== T ==
- César Thomson (1857–1931)
- Johannes Tinctoris (c. 1435–1511)
- Edgar Tinel (1854–1912)
- Geert van Turnhout (c. 1520–1580)

== U ==
- Alexander Utendal (1543/1545–1581)
- Yolande Uyttenhove (1925–2000)

== V ==
- Jacobus Vaet (c. 1529–1567)
- Jan Van der Roost (born 1956)
- Maurice Vaute (1913–2000)
- Carl Verbraeken (born 1950)
- Cornelis Verdonck (1563–1625)
- Gaspar Verlit (1622–1682)
- Henri Vieuxtemps (1820–1881)

== W ==
- Hubert Waelrant (c. 1517–1595)
- André Waignein (1942–2015)
- Gaspar van Weerbeke (c. 1445 – after 1516)
- Giaches de Wert (1535–1596)
- Adrian Willaert (c. 1490–1562)

== Y ==
- Eugène Ysaÿe (1858–1931)
- Théo Ysaÿe (1865–1918)

== See also ==
- Lists of composers
- List of Dutch composers
