= Chronological list of Belgian classical composers =

== Medieval ==
- Johannes Ciconia (c. 1370–1412)

== Renaissance ==
- Guillaume Dufay (1397–1474)
- Gilles Binchois (c. 1400–1460)
- Johannes Brassart (c. 1400/1405–1455)
- Johannes Ockeghem (c. 1410/1425–1497)
- Antoine Busnois (c. 1430–1492)
- Johannes Tinctoris (c. 1435–1511)
- Hayne van Ghizeghem (c. 1445–after 1476)
- Johannes de Stokem (c. 1445–1487 or 1501)
- Gaspar van Weerbeke (c. 1445–after 1516)
- Loyset Compère (c. 1445–1518)
- Alexander Agricola (1445/1446–1506)
- Matthaeus Pipelare (c. 1450 – c. 1515)
- Heinrich Isaac (Henricus Ysaac) (c. 1450/1455–1517)
- Josquin des Prez (c. 1450/1455–1521)
- Pierre de la Rue (c. 1452–1518)
- Jacobus Barbireau (1455–1491)
- Jacob Obrecht (c. 1457/1458–1505)
- Antonius Divitis (Anthonius Rycke) (c. 1470 – c. 1530)
- Adrian Willaert (c. 1490–1562)
- Johannes Ghiselin (Verbonnet) (fl. 1491–1507)
- Nicolas Gombert (c. 1495 – c. 1560)
- Thomas Crecquillon (c. 1505–1557)
- Jean De Latre (c. 1505/1510–1569)
- Jacob Clemens non Papa (c. 1510/1515 – c. 1555)
- Cipriano de Rore (1515/1516–1565)
- Hubert Waelrant (c. 1517–1595)
- Geert van Turnhout (c. 1520–1580)
- Philippus de Monte (1521–1603)
- Theodor Evertz (fl. c. 1554)
- Jacobus Vaet (c. 1529–1567)
- Jacobus de Kerle (1531/1532–1591)
- Orlandus Lassus (c. 1532–1594)
- Giaches de Wert (1535–1596)
- Jean de Castro (c. 1540–1611)
- Andreas Pevernage (1542/1543–1591)
- Alexander Utendal (1543/1545–1581)
- George de La Hèle (1547–1586)
- Emmanuel Adriaenssen (c. 1554–1604)
- Carolus Luython (1557–1620)
- Philippus Schoendorff (1558–1617)
- Cornelis Verdonck (1563–1625)

== Baroque ==
- Peeter Cornet (c. 1570/1580–1633)
- Géry de Ghersem (1573/1575–1630)
- Léonard de Hodémont (c. 1575–1639)
- Mateo Romero (Mathieu Rosmarin) (c. 1575–1647)
- Guilielmus Messaus (1589–1640)
- Nicolaes a Kempis (c. 1600–1676)
- Henri Dumont (1610–1684)
- Jacques de Saint-Luc (1616 – c. 1710)
- Abraham van den Kerckhoven (c. 1618 – c. 1701)
- Gaspar Verlit (1622–1682)
- Daniel Danielis (1635–1696)
- Joannes Florentius a Kempis (1635–after 1711)
- Lambert Chaumont (c. 1635–1712)
- Carolus Hacquart (c. 1640–1701?)
- Alphonse d'Eve (1666–1727)
- Petrus Hercules Brehy (1673–1737) ()
- Jean-Baptiste Loeillet of London (John Loeillet) (1680–1730)
- Jacques Loeillet (1685–1748)
- Jean-Joseph Fiocco (1686–1746)
- Jean Baptiste Loeillet of Ghent (1688 – c. 1720)
- Josse Boutmy (1697–1779)
- Joseph-Hector Fiocco (1703–1741)
- Henri-Jacques de Croes (1705–1786)
- Jean-Noël Hamal (1709–1778)

== Classical ==
- Joseph Abaco (1710–1805)
- Charles-Joseph van Helmont (1715–1790)
- Matthias Vanden Gheyn (1721–1785)
- Henri Moreau (composer) (1728–1803)
- Pieter van Maldere (1729–1768)
- François Joseph Gossec (1734–1829)
- André Ernest Modeste Grétry (1741–1813)
- Jérôme-Joseph de Momigny (1762–1842)

== Romantic ==
- Martin-Joseph Mengal (1784–1851)
- François-Joseph Fétis (1784–1871)
- Nicolas Bosret (1799–1876)
- Jean-Valentin Bender (1801–1873)
- Charles Auguste de Bériot (1802–1870)
- Karel-Louis (Charles-Louis) Hanssens (1802–1871)
- Albert Grisar (1808–1869)
- Jean-Baptiste Singelée (1812–1875)
- Félix Godefroid (1818–1897)
- Henri Vieuxtemps (1820–1881)
- César Franck (1822–1890)
- Jacques-Nicolas Lemmens (1823–1881)
- Dieudonné Dagnelies (1825–1894)
- Constantin Bender (1826–1902)
- François-Auguste Gevaert (1828–1908)
- Désiré Magnus (1828–1884)
- Eduard Lassen (1830–1904)
- Peter Benoit (1834–1901)
- Jean-Théodore Radoux (1835–1911)
- Joseph Callaerts (1838–1901)
- Louis Brassin (1840–1884)
- Jan Blockx (1851–1912)
- Jacques Martin (1851–1930)
- Edgar Tinel (1854–1912)
- Sylvain Dupuis (1856–1931)
- César Thomson (1857–1931)
- Eugène Ysaÿe (1858–1931)
- Ivan Caryll (1861–1921)
- Arthur De Greef (1862–1940)
- Théo Ysaÿe (1865–1918)
- Guillaume Lekeu (1870–1894)

== Modern/Contemporary ==
- August de Boeck (1865–1937)
- Paul Gilson (1865–1942)
- Lodewijk Mortelmans (1868–1952)
- Joseph Ryelandt (1870–1965)
- Joseph Jongen (1873–1953)
- Flor Alpaerts (1876–1954)
- Albert Dupuis (1877–1967)
- Jean Rogister (1879–1964)
- Arthur Meulemans (1884–1966)
- Jef van Hoof (1886–1959)
- Lodewijk De Vocht (1887–1977)
- Francis de Bourguignon (1890–1961)
- Maurice Schoemaker (1890–1964)
- René Barbier (1890–1981)
- Marinus de Jong (1891–1984)
- Jules Strens (1893–1971)
- Jean Absil (1893–1974)
- Albert Huybrechts (1899–1938)
- André Souris (1899–1970)
- Marcel Poot (1901–1988)
- Gérard Favere (1903–1975)
- Flor Peeters (1903–1986)
- Armand Preud'homme (1904–1986)
- René Bernier (1905–1984)
- Daniel Sternefeld (1905–1986)
- René Defossez (1905–1988)
- Jef Maes (1905–1996)
- Arthur Bosmans (1908–1991)
- Karel De Schrijver (1908–1992)
- Jos Moerenhout (1909–1985)
- Lucien Gekiere (1912–1990)
- Jos Hanniken (1912–1998)
- Willy Ostijn (1913–1993)
- Maurice Vaute (1913–2000) ()
- Ernest van der Eyken (1913–2010)
- Pierre Froidebise (1914–1962)
- Marcel Quinet (1915–1986)
- Victor Legley (1915–1994)
- Georges Follman (born 1920)
- Charles Frison (born 1921)
- Karel Goeyvaerts (1923–1993)
- Peter Cabus (1923–2000)
- Herman Roelstraete (1925–1985)
- Yolande Uyttenhove (1925–2000)
- Guy Duijck (1927–2008)
- Louis Marischal (1928–1999)
- Willem Kersters (1929–1998)
- Philibert Mees (1929–2006)
- Henri Pousseur (1929–2009)
- Didier van Damme (born 1929)
- Frédéric Devreese (1929–2020)
- Jan Segers (born 1929)
- Werner Van Cleemput (1930–2006)
- Jacqueline Fontyn (born 1930)
- Lucien Goethals (1931–2006)
- André Laporte (born 1931)
- Jean-Marie Simonis (born 1931)
- Jacques Leduc (born 1932)
- Elias Gistelinck (1935–2005)
- Philippe Boesmans (born 1936)
- Frans Geysen (born 1936)
- Pierre Bartholomée (born 1937)
- André Waignein (born 1942)
- Jan De Maeyer (born 1949)
- Carl Verbraeken (born 1950)
- Robert Groslot (born 1951)
- Karel De Wolf (1952–2011)
- Jan Haderman (born 1952)
- Lucien Posman (born 1952)
- Godfried-Willem Raes (born 1952)
- Wim Mertens (born 1953)
- Jan Van der Roost (born 1956)
- Nicholas Lens (born 1957)
- Hans Vermeersch (born 1957)
- Luc Brewaeys (1959–2015)
- Dirk Brossé (born 1960)
- Piet Swerts (born 1960)
- Wim Henderickx (1962–2022)
- Houman Khalaj (born 1980)
- Frank Bernaerts (born 1967)
- Pierre Kolp (born 1969)
- Annelies Van Parys (born 1975)
- Bram Van Camp (born 1980)
- Adrien Tsilogiannis (born 1982)
- Daan Janssens (born 1983)
- Frederik Neyrinck (born 1985)
