= Loeillet =

Loeillet may refer to:

- Jean Baptiste Loeillet of Ghent (1688–c. 1720), composer
- Jean-Baptiste Loeillet of London (1680–1730), flutist, oboist, harpsichordist, and composer. The two Jean-Baptiste Loeillets were cousins
- Jacques Loeillet (1685–1748), oboist and composer, younger brother of London Loeillet
- 13011 Loeillet, a Main-belt Asteroid
