= Prix de Rome (Belgium) =

Belgian award for young artists

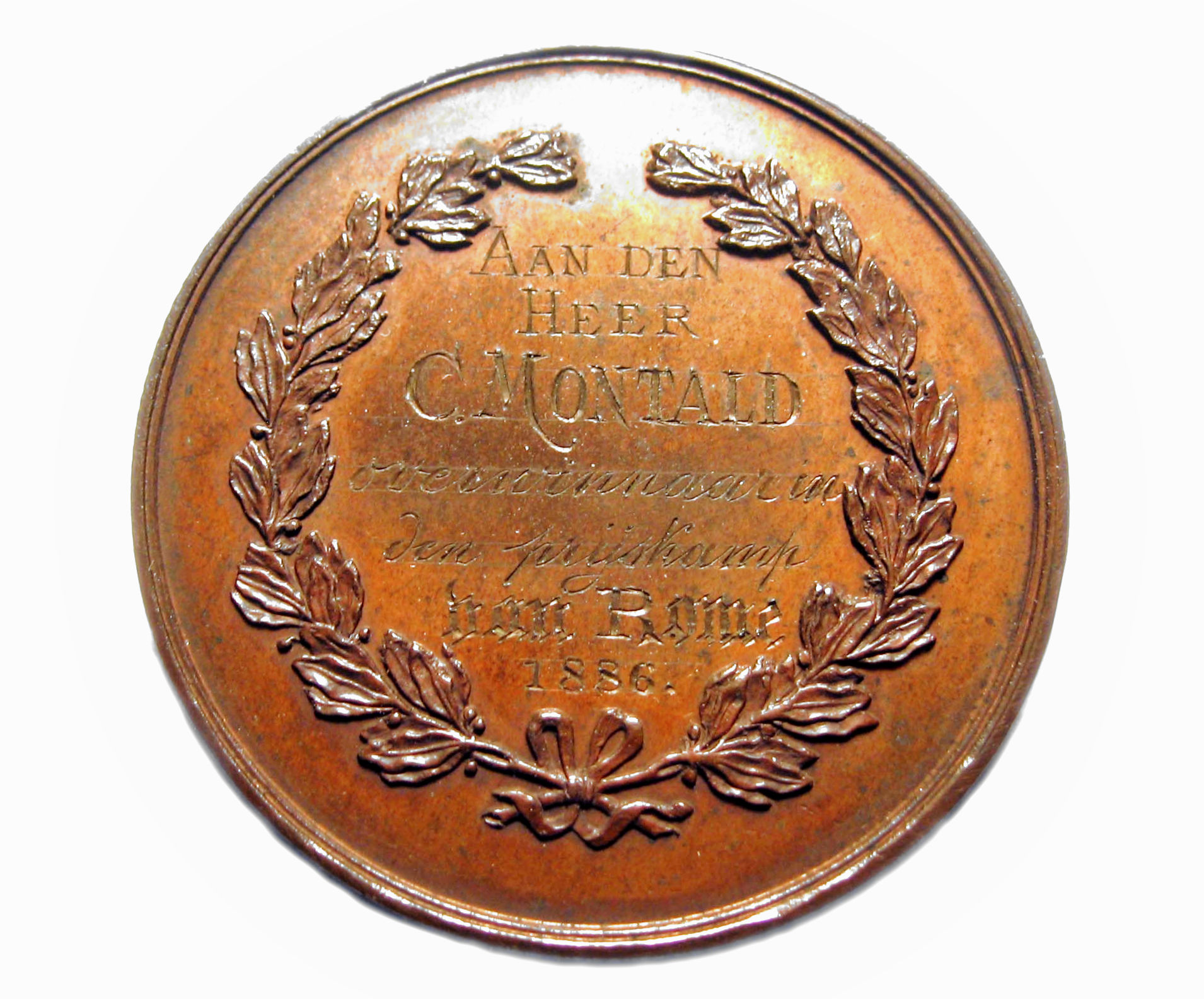
Prize medal received by Constant Montald in 1886

The Belgian Prix de Rome (Dutch: Prijs van Rome) is an award for young artists, created in 1832, following the example of the original French Prix de Rome. The Royal Academy of Fine Arts Antwerp organised the prize until 1920, when the national government took over. The first prize is also sometimes called the Grand Prix de Rome. There were distinct categories for painting, sculpture, architecture and music.

== History ==
The Prix de Rome was a scholarship for arts students. It was created in 1663 in France under the reign of Louis XIV. It was an annual burse for promising artists (painters, sculptors, and architects) who proved their talents by completing a very difficult elimination contest. The prize, organised by the Royal Academy of Painting and Sculpture (Académie royale de peinture et de sculpture), was open to their students. The award winner would win a stay at the Palazzo Mancini in Rome at the expense of the King of France. The stay could be extended if the director of the institution deemed it desirable.

Expanded after 140 years into five categories, the contest started in 1663 as three categories – painting, sculpting, and architecture; in 1803, music was added; in 1804, engraving was added. The winner of the "First Grand Prize" (called the agréé) would be sent to The Academy of France in Rome founded by Jean-Baptiste Colbert in 1666. In 1807, Louis Napoleon created the Dutch version of the Prix de Rome. After the creation of Belgium as an independent state in 1830, the Belgian government started their own version of the Prix de Rome in 1832.

== Winners ==
- 1832: Antoine Wiertz, painting
- 1838: Romain Eugène Van Maldeghem, painting
- 1842: Jean Portaels, painting
- 1843: Victor Lagye, painting
- 1845: Adolphe Samuel, music
- 1846: Jozef Geefs, sculpture
- 1847: François-Auguste Gevaert, music
- 1847: Joseph Stallaert, painting
- 1848: Joseph Bal, engraving
- 1849: Chrétien-Joseph-François-Alex Stadtfeldt, music
- 1850: Louis Delbeke, painting
- 1851: Eduard Lassen, music
- 1852: Ferdinand Pauwels, painting
- 1853: Luigi Agnesi, music
- 1855: Pierre Demol, music
- 1855: Gustave-Joseph Biot, painting
- 1857: Peter Benoit, music
- 1857: Polydore Beaufaux, painting
- 1858: Jean-Louis Baeckelmans, architecture
- 1859: Jean-Théodore Radoux, music
- 1862: Louis Delacenserie, architecture
- 1863: Henri-Joseph Dupont, music
- 1864: Jan Frans Deckers, sculpture
- 1865: Léon-Gustave Huberti, music
- 1866: Joseph Naert, architecture
- 1867: Edgar Tinel, music
- 1869: Jean-Baptiste Vanden Eeden, music
- ?: Henri Van Dievoet, architecture
- 1870: Xavier Mellery, painting
- 1871: Ernest Dieltiens, architecture
- 1871: Guillaume Demol, music
- 1875: Isodore-Séraphin De Vos, music
- 1877: Julien Dillens, sculpture
- 1877: Julien-Jean Simar, music
- 1880: Rémy Cogghe, painting
- 1881: Sylvain Dupuis, music
- 1882: Guillaume Charlier, sculpture
- 1884: Eugeen Dieltiens, architecture
- 1885: Léon Dubois, music
- 1885: Julius Anthone, sculpture
- 1886: Constant Montald, painting
- 1887: Pierre Heckers, music
- 1887: Charles De Wulf, architecture
- 1889: Paul Gilson, music
- 1891: Paul-Henri-Joseph Lebrun, music
- 1893: Lodewijk Mortelmans, music
- 1895: Jean Delville, painting
- 1895: Martin Lunssens, music
- 1897: Joseph Jongen, music
- 1898: Émile Vloors, painting
- 1899: François Rasse, music
- 1901: Adolphe Biarent, music
- 1902: Triphon De Smet, architecture
- 1909: Robert Herberigs, music
- 1909: Marcel Rau, sculpture
- 1911: Michel Brusselmans, music
- 1911: Louis Buisseret, graphics
- 1913: Léon Jongen, music
- 1920: Max Van Dyck, painting
- 1920: René Barbier, music
- 1921: Fernand Quinet, music
- 1922: Marie Howet, painting
- 1924: Edgard Steurbaut, architecture
- 1927: Jeanne Louise Milde, sculpture
- 1932: Jean Boedts, sculpture
- 1932: Willy Kreitz, sculpture
- 1933: Jozef-Louis Stynen, architecture
- 1933: Prosper Van Eechaute, music
- 1935: Alphonse Darville, sculpture
- 1935 - Cantata Le Vieux Soudard, Léon Simar (1909-1983) second prize (music)
- 1936: Victor Blommaert, architecture
- 1937: Jan Cobbaert, painting
- 1937 - Cantata Le Trapèze Étoilé, Léon Simar (1909-1983) first prize (music)
- 1939: Leo De Budt, painting
- 1940: Gustave Camus, painting
- 1941: Maurits De Vocht, architecture
- 1943: Henri Brasseur, painting
- 1943: Jean Louel, music
- 1944: Albert Baisieux, sculpture
- 1944: Lode Eyckermans, sculpture
- 1945: Marcel Quinet, music
- 1946: Jos De Maegd, painting
- 1950: Paul Ausloos, painting
- 1953: Joseph Braun, sculpture
- 1956: Olivier Strebelle, sculpture
- 1959: Jacqueline Fontyn, music
- 1961: Alfons Van Meirvenne, sculpture
- 1961: Jacques Leduc, music
- 1965: Frederik Van Rossum, music
- 1967: Paul Schellekens, architecture
- 1969: Johan Baele, architecture
- 1974: Serge Gangolf, sculpture

== Second prizes ==
- 1846: Joseph-Jacques Ducaju, sculpture
- 1847: Jacques-Nicolas Lemmens, music
- 1851: Jan Andries Laumans, sculpture
- 1857: Joseph Conradi, music
- 1865: Gustave-Jean-Constant-Marie Van Hoey, music
- 1869: Emile-Louis-Victor Mathieu, music
- 1869: Félix Pardon, music
- 1875: Alfred Tilman, music
- 1889: Victor Van Dyck, painting (third prize - Max Van Dyck's father, winner 1920)
- 1891: Guillaume Lekeu, music
- 1891: Charles-Antoine Smulders, music
- 1893: Joseph Vander Meulen, music
- 1895: Nicolas Daneau, music
- 1899: Léon Henry, music
- 1899: Albert Dupuis, music
- 1904: Joe English, painting
- 1907: Joe English, painting
- 1909: Geo Verbanck, sculpture
- 1913: Alphonse Decuyper, second prize
- 1919: René Barbier, music
- 1922: Jean Absil, music
- 1923: Auguste Mambour, painting
- 1925: Lode De Maeyer, painting
- 1930: Jacques Maes, painting
- 1931: Léon Stekke, music
- 1943: Vic Legley, music
- 1947: André Willequet, sculpture
- 1952: Bérénice Devos, painting

== See also ==
- List of European art awards
