= Evaristo Felice Dall'Abaco =

Italian composer (1675–1742)

Evaristo Felice Dall'Abaco (12 July 1675, Verona, Republic of Venice — 12 July 1742, Munich, Bavaria) was an Italian composer, violinist, and cellist.

== Life ==
Dall'Abaco was born in Verona to renowned guitarist Damiano dall'Abaco. He is thought to have been a pupil of Torelli's, from whom he would have learned violin and cello.

He became a violinist with Tommaso Antonio Vitali in Modena and in 1704, joined the court of Maximilian II Emanuel, Elector of Bavaria in Munich as Kammermusiker. After only a few months, he fled with the court to Brussels following Maximilian's defeat at the Battle of Blenheim. When he went into exile with the court, he spent time in France and absorbed some of the influences there. On Maximilian's restoration and return to Munich in 1715, Dall'Abaco was appointed Concert-meister. He continued to compose chamber music at the French and Dutch courts until 1740, when he retired. Dall'Abaco's music is especially indebted to Vivaldi and Corelli. Dall'Abaco died on his 67th birthday.

While in Brussels, Dall'Abaco fathered Joseph Abaco (1710–1805).

== Published works ==
- Opus 1: 12 Sonate da Camera, for violin and violoncello with accompaniment
- Opus 2: 12 Concerti a quattro da Chiesa
- Opus 3: 12 Sonate da Chiesa a tre
- Opus 4: 12 Sonate da Camera a violino e violoncello
- Opus 5 & 6: Concerti a piu Instrumenti
