= Guilielmus Borremans =

Belgian composer

Guiglielmus Borremans or Willem Borremans was a Flemish composer and the choir master of the Saint Gaugericus Church in Brussels.

== Life and work ==
In 1660, he published in Antwerp, at the editing house of Petrus Phalesius' descendants, a series of Christmas songs in four parts and with Dutch and Latin texts, which bore the title: Cantiones natalitiae quinque vocum auctore d. Guiliel. Borremans in ecclesia parochiali S. Gaucerici Bruxellis phonasco. Antwerp: Apud haeredes Petri Phalesii, 1660.

The melody was put in the upper voice. The praecentus doubled the cantus. It is not clear what this meant. The soloist might have been singing in front, while the choir sang in the background. The way the songs have been edited might suggest the songs were performed in this way. It has also been suggested the praecentus sang half of the stanzas or the complete stanzas, while the choir would have repeated them. This kind of performance has been found written down in some older editions of similar material. As this doubling of the cantus by a praecentus has been applied also in two other editions by composers, who like Borremans, worked in Brussels, we seem to encounter a typical Brussels variation on the theme of the Cantiones Natalitiae. Those Brussels composers are Joannes Florentius a Kempis, who played the organ at the "Chapel of Our Lady" Church (Kapellekerk), and whose edition appeared in 1657, and Gaspar de Verlit, who was choir master of the St. Nicolas Church (Sint-Niklaaskerk) and whose edition was published in 1660.

== External links and sources ==
- Description of the source of the Cantiones natalitiae in the Christ Church Library's online catalogue
- An interesting Dutch text about the Cantiones natalitiae in general where Borremans is mentioned
