= Alfons Van Meirvenne =

Belgian painter and sculptor (1932–2025)

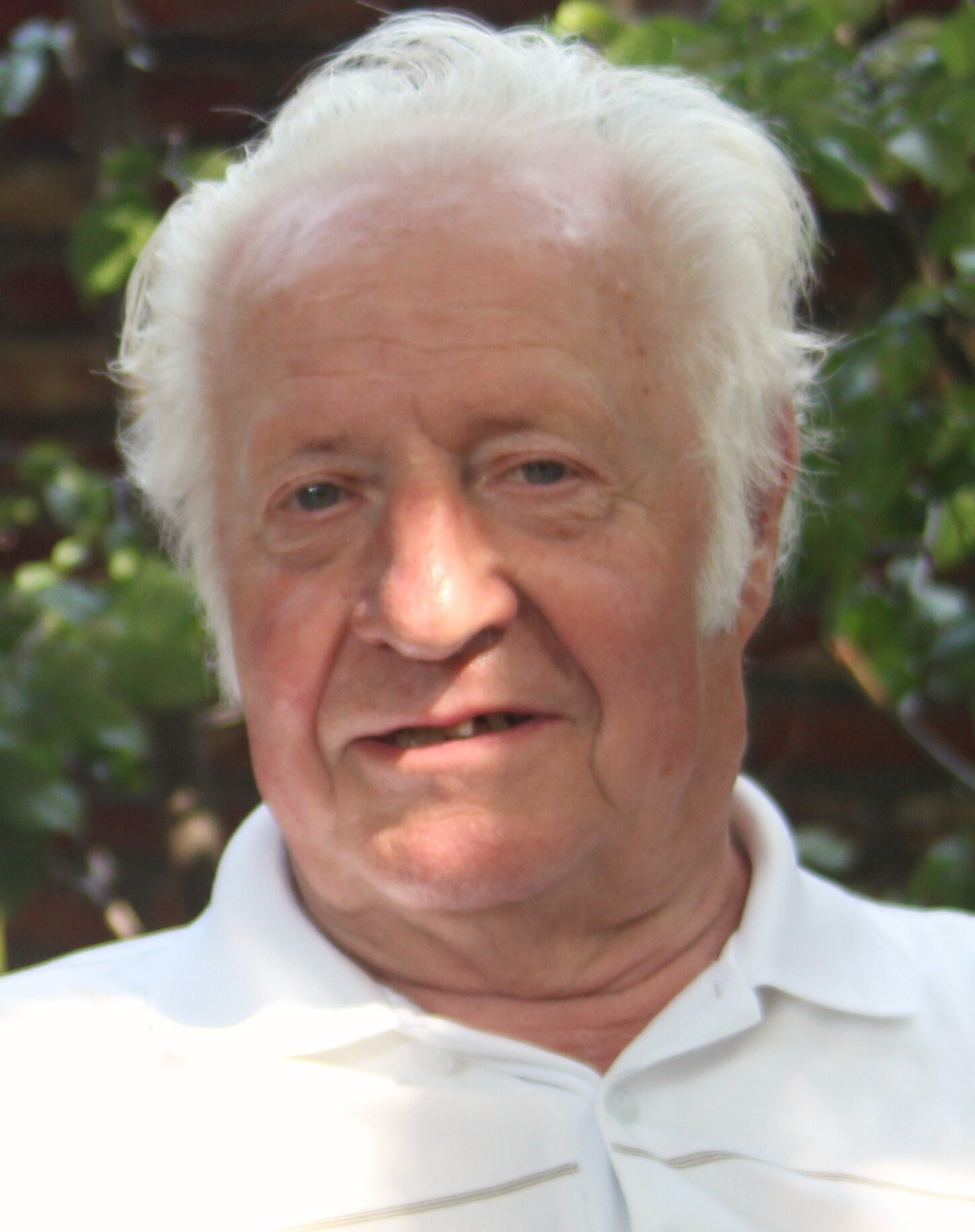
- Van Meirvenne in 2012
- Born: 6 December 1932; Haasdonk, Belgium
- Died: 1 September 2025 (aged 92); Belsele, Belgium
- Occupations: Painter, sculptor

Alfons Van Meirvenne (6 December 1932 – 1 September 2025) was a Belgian painter and sculptor. He was a recipient of the Grand Prix de Rome (1961).

Van Meirvenne died in Belsele on 1 September 2025, at the age of 92.
