= Paul Danblon =

Composer, opera director and administrator, journalist

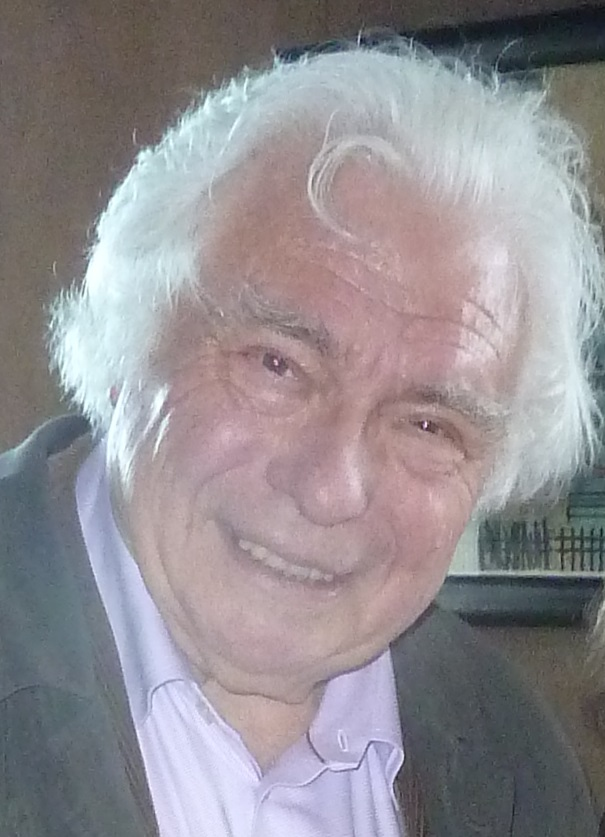

Paul Danblon (25 July 1931 – 8 February 2018) was a Belgian composer, opera director and administrator, and journalist. He was one of the pioneers of scientific journalism on RTBF (Radio télévision belge de la communauté française). In 1954, after graduating in chemistry from the Université libre de Bruxelles, Danblon joined the RTBF current events programme, Carnets de l'Actualité. He went on to specialize in producing and presenting popular science programmes such as La Bouteille à encre, Connaître, and Le point de la médecine. He is the author of two books in the area:

- 150 ans de sciences (1830–1980) (Paul Legrain, Brussels, 1980)
- L'espace (Lombard, Brussels, 1964)

Danblon has also had a parallel career in the arts. He studied composition at the Brussels Conservatory with Jean Absil and Marcel Quinet. His first work, a piano concerto, premiered in Moscow in 1954. His other compositions include:

- Les Troyennes (1954) - Oratorio to a libretto by Jean Le Paillot
- Cyrano de Bergerac (1980) - Opera composed for the 150th anniversary of the creation of the Belgian state, with Gabriel Bacquier in the title role.

He joined the Opéra Royal de Wallonie in Liège as a stage director in 1974, and in 1990 wrote the text for a musical entertainment performed by the company, Divertimento doux-amer de Mademoiselle Mozart. In 1992, he became the General Director of the Opéra Wallonie, a post he held until 1996.

A prominent member of the Belgian Laïcité movement, he is the founder and president of the Centre Laïque de l'Audiovisuel. His book, Au bonheur de vivre: libres propos d'un mécréant (Éditions Complexe, 1999), traces the evolution of his religious philosophy which began with devout Catholicism and evolved into agnostic humanism. He has also written many articles and essays in this area, including:

- "La laïcité et les médias", La Pensée et les Hommes, 1985, pp. 66–75.
- "Le rationalisme est-il en crise?", La Pensée et les Hommes, 1991, pp. 153–159.
- "Europe, terre d'humanisme... De quel droit ", Espace de Liberté, 1997, pp. 17–28.
- "Des souris et des hommes", Belgique: toujours grande et belle, 1999, pp. 219–224.
