= Frans Deckers =

Belgian sculptor

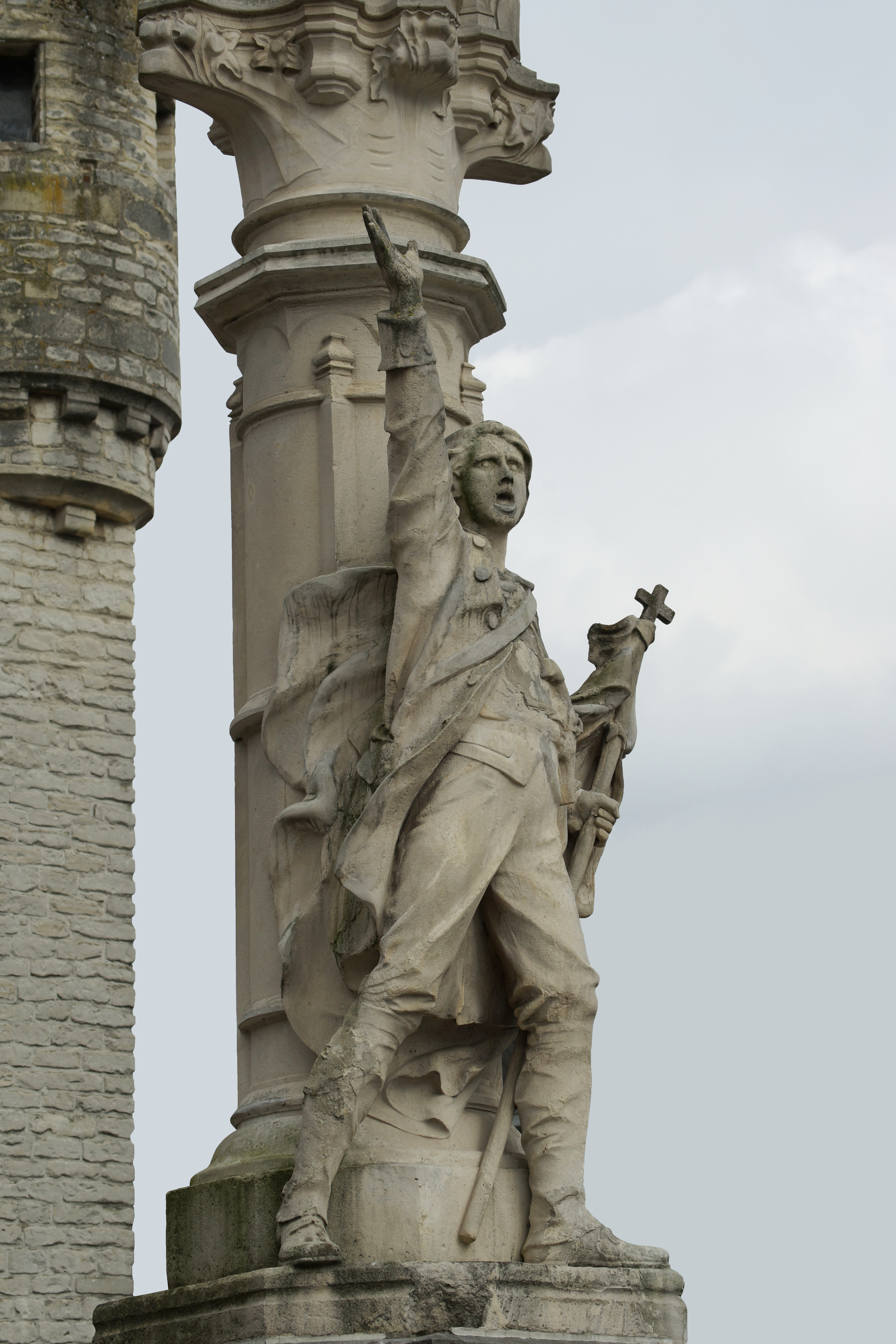
Grote Markt of Herentals, statue in honor of the "Peasant Warrior", 1898

Frans Deckers (20 March 1835 – 18 October 1916) was a Belgian sculptor.

== Life and work ==
Joannes Franciscus Deckers was born in Antwerp on 20 March 1835, to Jean François Deckers (born in Merksem, circa 1800), a baker, and Maria Catharina Stumpers (born in Eindhoven, circa 1804).

He married Maria Theresia Venesoen (Antwerp, 28 August 1839 – Antwerp, 8 April 1918) on 23 February 1865. They had six children. His son Edward also became a sculptor.

Frans Deckers studied at the Royal Academy of Fine Arts in Antwerp, where he was taught by Joseph Geefs. He mainly made idyllic sculptures with a romantic undertone.

In 1864 he won the Prix de Rome. From 1885 to 1916 he himself was a professor at the Antwerp Academy. He taught, among others, visual artist Egidius Ludovicus Everaerts.

Deckers died in the fall of 1916 at the age of 81. He was interred in a family grave, at the Sint-Fredegandus cemetery in Deurne.
