= Fernand Quinet =

Fernand Quinet (29 January 1898 - 24 October 1971) was a Belgian cellist, conductor, and composer. A native of Charleroi, he studied music theory in the city of his birth prior to enrolling in the Brussels Conservatory; there, his instructors included Edouard Jacobs for cello and Léon Dubois for composition. He also studied under Adolphe Biarent. Much of his career was dedicated to teaching and conducting; from 1924 until 1938 he led the conservatory in Charelroi, and in the latter year succeeded François Rasse as the director of the Royal Conservatory of Liège, in which role he remained until 1963. In 1948 he founded the Orchestre Philharmonique de Liège, whose principal conductor he was until 1965. From 1916 he was a member of the Pro Arte Quartet, but he ceased playing the cello in 1923. As a composer, Quinet produced relatively little music; his output consists mainly of songs and chamber pieces, but includes some orchestral music as well. His cantata La guerre received the Prix de Rome for 1921.
