= Irène Fuerison =

Belgian composer

Irène Fuerison, née Van Santen, (8 January 1875 - 26 June 1931) was a Belgian composer.

== Biography ==
Irène Van Santen was born in Ghent to a tradesman, August Van Santen, and a contralto singer, Florine Lepla, who was a graduate of the conservatoire of Ghent (class of Louis Cabel, 1867) and who performed in public at least until 1878. Irène learned to play piano and maybe to sing as well. In 1893, she married the lawyer Joseph Fuerison and assumed his name. They had one daughter in 1899, named Madeleine.

The Fuerisons lived in a mansion in Ghent and, while being fluent in Flemish, belonged to the French-speaking middleclass. They spent the First World War in Ghent.

Fuerison was widowed in 1921 after her husband suffered a stroke. She had been visually impaired for several years by then.

Fuerison died at her home in Ghent in 1931. She bequeathed a fund for a prize to encourage promising young Belgian composers; the Irène Fuerison-prize is being awarded every two years since 1934.

== Work ==
Fuerison's music compositions include over 70 songs for voice and piano, but also a couple of pieces for piano solo and for chamber music, some orchestra works and one music theatre work. Her vocal work is mostly in French language.

Her compositional activity occurred in three periods.

- Her earliest works are nine songs dated "1908" and "1909" (op. 1 to 9).
- Her most prolific activity occurred during the First World War and until her husband's death in 1921 (op. 10 to 75 or 76).
- She resumed composing in 1923-1924 (op. 76 or 77 to 86 or 87) and again in 1926 (op. 87 or 88 to 95).

Over the course of the years, her style matured towards a distancing from tonal harmonic frameworks, until in 1926 she stopped writing key signatures. Her style is impressionistic, post-romantic but not atonal.See also

Friant, L., (2000) “Irène Fuerison.”, Ghendtsche Tydinghen 29(1). doi: https://doi.org/10.21825/gt.v29i1.6241

Lebbe, P. (2020) "Irène Fuerison. How a Ghent-based composer disappeared from the musical landscape". Forum+ www.forum-online.be (in Dutch). Retrieved 2021-11-24.

Roquet, F. (2007) "Fuerison, Irène", Lexicon Vlaamse componisten geboren na 1800, Roularta, 946 p., p. 336.
