= Édouard Jacobs =

Belgian musician

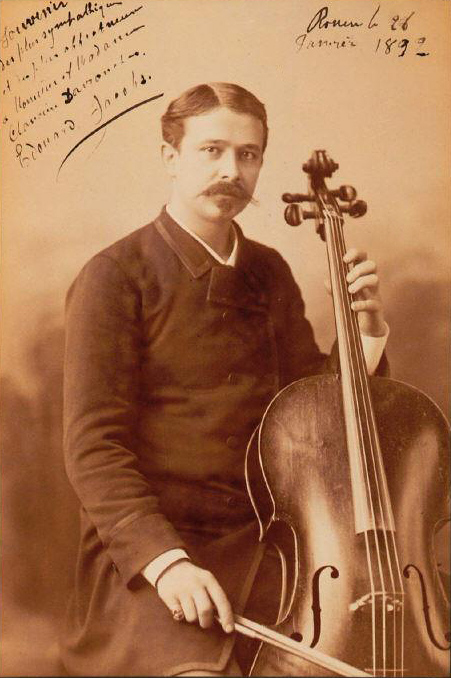
Edouard Jacobs

Édouard Jacobs (born 1851 in Halle, Belgium; died 1925) was a Belgian cellist. He was a pupil of Joseph Servais (a son of Adrien-François Servais), at the Brussels Conservatory. He played in the Weimar court orchestra for some years. In 1885 he succeeded his teacher as cello professor at the Brussels Conservatory. He also played viol da gamba in concerts of early music. Among his pupils was Fernand Quinet.
