= Philipp Schöndorff =

Flemish singer, trumpeter and composer

Philipp Schöndorff or Philippus Schoendorff/Philipp Schoendorpp (1558 – after 1617) was a Flemish singer, trumpeter and composer at the court of Rudolf II under kapellmeister Philippe de Monte as a contemporary of Carl Luython, Giorgi Flori and Jacob Regnart. He was born in Liège and died in Prague.

== Works, editions and recordings ==
- Missa super "La dolce vista" 1587; based on one of Monte's madrigals, and dedicated to Rudolf II.
- Missa super "Usquequo Domine" a 6.
- Motets Odae suavissimae; dedicated to the court chaplain Jacques Chimarrhaeus, also from Liège and also a singer in the chapel. Incomplete.
- Magnificat sexti toni a 5, Venice 1593, Nuremberg 1600
- Motets Veni Sancte Spiritus a 5, Te decet hymnus a 6, Nuremberg 1600
- More tibi veteri
