= Léon Jongen =

Belgian composer and organist

Joseph Jongen
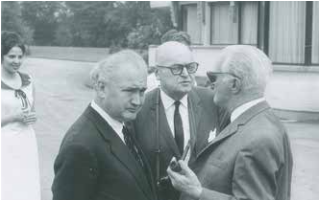
- Léon Jongen, composer, with pianists Edouardo del Pueyo and Jules Gentil at the Queen Elisabeth Music Chapel, circa 1958.
- Born: Marie-Victor-Justin-Léon Jongen; 2 March 1884; Liège
- Died: 18 November 1969 (aged 85); Brussels
- Education: Liège Conservatoire
- Occupations: Organist; Composer; Academic
- Organizations: Liège Conservatoire; Royal Conservatory of Brussels
- Awards: Prix de Rome; Queen Elisabeth Competition

Léon Jongen (2 March 1884 – 18 November 1969) was a Belgian composer and organist.

== Musical career ==
He was born in Liège on 2 March 1884. His father Alphonse had an atelier there and worked as a woodcarver. He was the younger brother of Joseph Jongen. Jongen studied at the Royal Conservatory of Liège and was appointed as organist at the Saint-Jacques church of Liège after his graduation in 1898. He left his post at Saint-Jacques church in 1908 in order to tour Europe with a piano quartet. He eventually settled in Paris, becoming accompanist to the tenor Imbart de la Tour. In 1913 he won the Prix de Rome with his cantata Les fiancés de Noël.

After the First World War, Jongen travelled the world: he visited Africa, India, China, Japan, and Hanoi. While in Hanoi he conducted the Tonkin Opera from 1927 to 1929. In 1934 he returned to Belgium to become a professor of fugue at the Royal Conservatory of Brussels. The Commission de surveillance gave his several directorial responsibilities in 1938 and officially appointed him as director on 1 August 1939. He succeeded his brother Joseph Jongen. His appointment as director lasted till 1949. Between 1960 and 1962 Léon Jongen was the chairman of the Queen Elisabeth Competition.

Jongen composed symphonic works and operas. Even though he was a great admirer of the French romantic school and even knew some influence by César Franck, his musical style evolved towards more modernistic traits. He died in Brussels.

== Selected works ==
- Étude Symphonique pour Servir de Prélude à l' Oedipe Roi 1908
- Roxelane 1920
- Suite Provençale 1926
- Suite Provençale No. 3 1926
- Campeador 1932
- In Memoriam Regis 1934
- Malaisie 1935
- Venezuela 1936
- Fanfare 1939
- Improvisation 1943
- Six Esquisses 1943
- Quatre Miniatures 1949
- Musique pour un Ballet 1954
- Divertissement en Forme de Variations sur un Thème de Haydn 1955
- Fanfare 1957
