= Eugène Godecharle =

Belgian violinist and composer

- Born: Eugène-Charles-Jean Godecharle; January 1742; Brussels, Austrian Netherlands
- Died: 26 June 1798 (aged 56); Brussels, Dyle, French First Republic
- Occupations: Violinist and composer
- Employer: Church of St Géry
- Parent: Jacques-Antoine Godecharle (father)
- Relatives: Lambert-François and Gilles-Lambert Godecharle (brothers)

Eugène-Charles-Jean Godecharle (bapt. 15 January 1742 – 26 June 1798) was a violinist and composer from the Austrian Netherlands.

== Family ==
Godecharle was born into a musical family in Brussels in 1742. His father, Jacques-Antoine Godecharle, was master of music in the church of St Nicholas, and bass singer at the court chapel of Prince Charles of Lorraine, governor of the Austrian Netherlands. Eugène's brother Lambert-François was also a musician, replacing his father as master of music at St Nicholas; another brother was the sculptor Gilles-Lambert Godecharle.

== Career ==
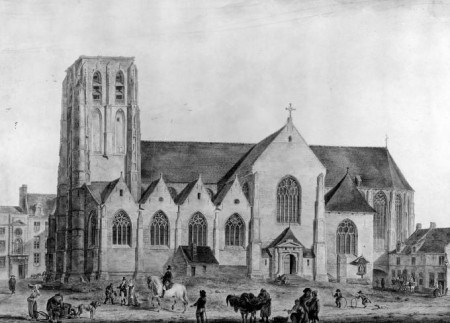
Church of St Géry, Brussels (demolished 1798–1802)

Eugène began in the Prince's choir: his father, noting his talent as a violinist, sent him to Paris for lessons.

On his return to Brussels, he played viola in the chapel from 1773. On the death of Henri-Jacques de Croes, master of the court chapel, in 1786, Godecharle applied to replace him but failed; he became lead violin only in 1788. In 1776 he became master of music at the Church of St Géry in Brussels, remaining in the post until his death.

== Compositions ==
Godecharle's publications include:

- Sonatas for violin with basso continuo, op. 1
- Symphonie nocturne for strings, two oboes, two horns, piccolo and drum
- Six symphonies, for strings, two oboes and two horns
- Three sonatas for harp with violin accompaniment
- Three sonatas for piano with violin accompaniment, op. 5
- Six sonatas for harp, violin, viola & b.c., op. 6

He left in manuscript much church music.
