= Adolphe Biarent =

Belgian composer, conductor, cellist and music teacher

Adolphe Biarent (16 October 1871 – 4 February 1916) was a Belgian composer, conductor, cellist and music teacher.

Biarent studied at the conservatories of Brussels and of Ghent, and was a pupil of Émile Mathieu. He won a Belgian Prix de Rome with his cantata Oedipe à Colone in 1901, after which he remained near his home in Charleroi, composing, conducting and teaching (or more accurately, engaging in pedagogy, for example the writing of manuals as well). He was the teacher of Fernand Quinet.

Although still little known now, Biarent composed music that successfully combines "the structural solidity" of César Franck and Vincent d'Indy with "something of the orchestral brilliance and clarity" of Emmanuel Chabrier.

== Selected works ==
- Orchestral works
  - Trenmor, after Ossian (1905)
  - Poème Heroique (1907–11)
  - Rapsodie wallonne (für Klavier und Orchester) (1910)
  - Symphony in D minor (1908)
  - Deux sonnets pour violoncelle et orchestre – d`après José-Maria de Hérédia (1909-1912)
    - I Le réveil d'un dieu
    - II Floridum Mare
- Chamber music
  - Piano Quintet in B minor
  - Cello Sonata in F♯ minor
- Vocal
  - Song Cycle Huit mélodies pour mezzo-soprano
    - I Lied
    - II Désir de mort
    - III Le chant de ma mère
    - IV Il passa
    - V Chanson
    - VI La lune blanche luit dans les bois
    - VII Ballades au Hameau
    - VIII La chanson du vent
