= Jean de Smetsky =

Belgian composer

Jean de Smetsky is the artist name of Jean Desmet. He was born in Gent (Belgium) in 1885 and died in Gentbrugge (Belgium) in 1954. He was married and had three daughters. He is best known for his music compositions for piano, bands and orchestras. He was a soldier in the Belgian army during the first world war, which marked his life and artistic inspirations. After the war he was orchestra leader in the Flemish Opera in Gent.

He composed several songs for the soldiers during the war. Some of his compositions were also used in propaganda by the Belgian army in the territories occupied by the German army.

Amongst his most popular compositions:

- March of the Spanish Soldiery, first published in 1927 and republished by Ludwig Music Publishers in 1972 in an arrangement by Paul Whear. A part of it was used in the 1927 silent film "The Gaucho" starring Douglas Fairbanks and Lupe Vélez set in Argentina. One can find a performance of the composition on YouTube.

- Flandria Overture - A recording from a performance by Orchestre d'Harmonie Leonardo Da Vinci, Saint-Léonard, Québec, on 8 May 2012 can be found on their Facebook page. Published by Ludwig Masters Publishing Company in 1941.

- Marche Royal. Published by Ludwig Masters Publishing Company.

Other work includes:

- Fox-Trot-Song (Music: Jean de Smetsky; Lyrics: Pierre d'Amor), published in 1921 by Hubert Jongen, 164 Rue Spintay, Verviers Pianola sheets have been produced for this. A recording can be found on YouTube.

- Le Coeur de Lison (Music: Jean de Smetsky; Lyrics: Pierre d'Amor), published in 1925 by Paul Decourcelle, 28 Rue Alphonse Karr, Nice

- Tchouki (Music for piano: Jean de Smetsky; Lyrics: Pierre d'Amor), published in 1925 by Paul Decourcelle, 28 Rue Alphonse Karr, Nice

- Clara (melody for orchestra and piano), published in 1926 by Louis Aerts, 2 bis rue Laferrière, Paris

- Farewell Boy (melody for violoncelle and orchestra, Brussels, 1929)

- Sourire de Printemps (Music: Jean de Smetsky; Lyrics: Pierre Alberty), published in 1920's by Hubert Jongen, 164 Rue Spintay, Verviers

- Trust Me (Music: Jean de Smetsky; Lyrics: Pierre d'Amor), published in 1920's by Hubert Jongen, 164 Rue Spintay, Verviers

- Judith (Prélude-ouverture, pour orchestre, avec piano conducteur), published in 1930 by Paul Decourcelle, 28 Rue Alphonse Karr, Nice

Many of his war compositions have been grouped and published by the Belgian army singer Ernest GENVAL. Amongst his compositions from during World War I, which were songs used by the soldiers, we find:

- Les Yasses

- Hymne à Liège

- Le Rondeau de la Marraine

- La Chanson des Exilés

- Dors mon P'tiot - Berceuse, en attendant l'Absent
