= Willy Ostijn =

Belgian composer (1913–1993)

William (Willy) Ostijn, also seen as Ostyn (13 July 1913 in Kachtem – 30 March 1993 in Roeselare), was a classical Belgian composer of the 20th century.

== Biography ==
At the age of sixteen, Willy Ostijn entered the Lemmensinstituut of Malines to study the piano with Marinus de Jong and the organ with Flor Peeters. He got a pedagogical diploma at the Royal Conservatory of Ghent, and first prizes of counterpoint, piano, chamber music and composition. Willy Ostijn becomes the second organist of the St Rumoldus’ Cathedral of Malines. From 1938 until his retirement, he was also a professor of musical education at the Royal Atheneum of Roeselare, a function that did not prevent him from giving lectures at the Music Academy of Izegem from 1939 to 1949.

Before the Second World War, Ostijn had a reputation with the Trio Willy Ostijn which played the great works of the repertory and Ostijn’s own compositions.

Between 1950 and 1960 his symphonic music and concertante pieces, written in a romantic style, were performed by many orchestras in Belgium and broadcast abroad. Conductors Paul Doulliez, Leonce Graz, Ernest Maes, Fernand Terby and Jozef Verhelst were the most active ones to publicize his works.

From 1960, the disinterest of the audience towards "light music" and neoclassical style caused the decline of Ostijn’s career. The reorganization of public broadcasting in Belgium in 1961 meant that his works were no longer broadcast. Thereafter, Ostijn devoted himself mainly to chamber music and choral music.

Far from seeking originality at all costs, Ostijn said: “Both in terms of technique and of vision, I have always remained faithful to the romantic tradition that sees music as a spontaneous and logical development of lyrical themes through classical harmony and rich, varying orchestration”. Between 1945 and 1955 he specialized in works (rhapsody, overture, concert piece, symphonic poem), often descriptive : "Spaanse balletsuite" ("Spanish ballet suite"), "Beelden uit Broadway" ("Images from Broadway"), "Marokkaanse Suite" ("Moroccan Suite"), "Ijslandvaarders" ("Icelandic seafarers"), "Beelden uit het Oosten" ("Images from the Orient"), or both "Concertstück for piano and orchestra" and "Concertstück for piano and strings".

His symphonic work is close to the Belgian Arthur Meulemans, the French Maurice Thiriet, the English Haydn Wood and the American Ferde Grofé.

== Works (incomplete list) ==
In most cases, the works of Willy Ostijn are undated. The dates mentioned in the list of works are those of the radio creations. Willy Ostijn almost always composed his works long time before the dates of creations indicated here.

=== Symphonic works ===
- "Drie Vlaamse dansen" ("Three Flemish Dances") (1942)
- "Suite for orchestra No. 1" (1948)
- "Images from the Orient" ("Oriental Scenes") (1949)
- "Romantische Concertwals" ("Romantic Concert Waltz") (1950)
- "Spanish Ballet Suite" (1950)
- "Suite for orchestra No. 2", in four movements (1950)
- "Images from Broadway" (1950)
- "Sentimental Rhapsody" (1950)
- "London Suite" (1951)
- "Moroccan Suite" (1951)
- "Rhapsody for orchestra", in three parts (1951)
- "Flandria Overture" (1952)
- "Blijdschap Overture" ("Gladness Doubt Overture") (1952)
- "Happy March" ("Concert March"), for band (1952)
- "Vlaamse Capriccio", for orchestra (1953; orig. for piano and orchestra, 1953)
- "Icelandic Seafarers" (1953)
- "Concert Overture" (1954)
- "Rural Scenes" (1954)
- "In Flander Fields", symphonic poem (1955)
- "Dramatic Overture" (1955)
- "Westland Overture" (1957)
- "Feest Overture" ("Festive Overture") (1958)
- "Concertstück for orchestra" (1958)
- "Mephisto Overture" (1959)
- "Berthold Overture" (1959)
- "Huldigingsmars" (1960)
- "Festival Overture" (1960)
- "Images from Zeebrugge", two pieces for orchestra (1960)
- "Twee Zeebeelden" ("Two pictures of the Sea") (1962)
- "Drie Zeebeelden" ("Three pictures of the Sea") (1963)
- "Capriccio Overture" (1965)
- "Zeeland Fantasy" (1979)
- "Two Impressions for orchestra" (1981)

=== Works for strings ===
- "Andante and Allegro for Strings" (1952)
- "Laeticia", for Strings (1954)
- "Divertimento for Strings (No. 1)", in four movements (1954) – There also exist two other Divertimentos for Strings
- "Concertstück for Strings (No. 1)" (1960) – There also exist three other Concertstücke for Strings
- "Arab Dance for Strings" (19??)

=== Concertante Works for piano ===
- "Vlaamse Rhapsody" ("Flemish Rhapsody") for piano and orchestra (1945)
- "Concert Ballade for piano and orchestra" (1951)
- "Nocturne for piano and Strings" in D major (1952)
- "Vlaamse Capriccio for piano and orchestra" (1953)
- "Concertstück for piano and Strings" in C minor (1959)
- "Concertstück for piano and orchestra" in D minor (1960)
- "Rhapsody for piano and Strings" in C major (1965)
- "Concerto for piano and orchestra" in D minor, in three movements (1976)

=== Concertante Works for other instruments ===
- "Romanza for violin and Strings" (1951)
- "Parade for Trumpet and orchestra" (1952)
- "Interludium for Horn and Strings" (1953)
- "Pastorale for Oboe and Strings" (1953)
- "Serenade for violin (or clarinet in B-flat) and Strings" (1954)
- "Canzonetta for Flute and Strings" (1958)
- "Interludium for Oboe and Strings" (1958)
- "Elegy for Oboe (or Soprano Saxophone, or Clarinet) and orchestra" (1964; transcription of the "Concertstück for piano and orchestra" in D minor, 1960)
- "Concerto for Horn and Strings", in three movements (1973)
- "Capriccio for Clarinet and Strings" (1975)
- "Concertstück for Alto Saxophone and orchestra" (1976)
- "Concerto for Trombone and orchestra", in three movements (1978)
- "Nocturne for cello and Strings" (19??)

=== Chamber works ===
- "Interludium for saxophone quartet" (1939)
- "Images from the Orient" ("Oriental Scenes") (1949; orig. for orchestra), version for clarinet (or violin) and piano; version for clarinet ensemble
- "Turkish March", for clarinet and piano (1950)
- "Rhapsody for saxophone choir", in two parts (1951)
- "Romanza for violin and piano" (1951; orig. for violin and Strings)
- "Fata Morgana", for clarinet, viola and piano (1952)
- "Trio « Twilight »", for clarinet, viola and piano (1952)
- "Parade for Trumpet and orchestra" (1952), version for clarinet and piano
- "Elegy for clarinet choir" (1952)
- "Nocturne for piano and clarinet ensemble" (1952; transcription of the "Nocturne for piano and Strings" in D major, 1952)
- "Elegy for viola and piano" (1954)
- "Intermezzo for two Clarinets" (1954)
- "Bolero", for clarinet and piano (1955)
- "Spanish Dance", for clarinet and piano (1955)
- "Rhapsody for clarinet ensemble" (or for flute ensemble), in two parts (1955)
- "Gladness Doubt Overture" (1955), version for clarinet quartet
- "Serenade for clarinet ensemble" (1956; transcription of the "Serenade for violin and Strings", 1954)
- "Elegy for two violins, viola and cello" (1956; orig. for viola and piano, 1954)
- "Interludium for Oboe and Strings" (1958), version for clarinet and piano
- "Interludium for Oboe and String quartet" (1958; orig. for oboe and Strings, 1958)
- "Divertimento for Strings (No. 1)", in four movements (1959), version for string quintet
- "Promenade for alto saxophone (or clarinet, or flute) and piano" (1960)
- "Pastorale for clarinet (or oboe, or trumpet) and piano" (1960)
- "Entrée héroïque", for clarinet ensemble (1960)
- "Intermezzo for two Horns and string quartet" (1960), version for two Flutes and piano
- "Valse noble" ("Edele Wals"), for clarinet, flute and piano (1962)
- "Canzone for clarinet and piano" (1964; transcription of the "Canzonetta for Flute and Strings", 1958)
- "Canzonetta for Soprano Saxophone and saxophone choir" (1965; transcription of the "Canzonetta for Flute and Strings", 1958)
- "Trio in B minor", for flute (or violin), viola and piano (1960)
- "Concertstück for Strings (No. 1)" (1960), version for string quintet
- "Ballade for violin and piano" (or organ) (1961)
- "Laeticia", for flute ensemble (1962; orig. for Strings, 1954)
- "Capriccio for violin (or flute, or clarinet), viola and piano" (1965)
- "De Winter is verganghen" ("The Winter is past"), for clarinet ensemble (1965)
- "Concertstück for oboe, clarinet, basson and horn" (1973)
- "Ballade for tenor saxophone and piano" (1975)
- "Foxtrot for clarinet ensemble" (1975)
- "Fantasia, for wind quintet" (Flute, Clarinet, Oboe, Horn and Bassoon) (1975)
- "Czardas", for clarinet and piano (1978)
- "Impression for Flute, Oboe, Clarinet and Bassoon" (1981; transcription of one of the "Two Impressions for orchestra", 1981)
- "Romanza for viola and piano" (19??)
- "Aubade for flute and piano" (19??)
- "Ballade for basson (or cello) and piano" (19??)
- "String Quartets No.1-4" (before 1953)
- "String Quartet No. 5" (1953)
- "Quintet for Oboe and string quartet" (19??)
- "Giocoso for Six Saxophones" (19??)
- "Impromptu for clarinet and piano" (19??)

=== Piano works ===
- "Miniature No. 1" (1935)
- "Miniature No. 2" (between 1935 and 1939)
- "Miniature No. 3" (1939)
- "Duinkerke" ("Dunkirk") (1950)
- "St. Winoksbergen" (1950)
- "Zuytcote" ("Zuydcoote") (1950)
- "Toccata No. 1" (1968)
- "Nocturne" (1968)
- "Ballade" (1970)
- "Toccata No. 2" (1979)
- "Rust Roest" (1979)
- "Capriccio" (19??)
- "Wiegelied" (19??)
- "Scherzetto" (19??)

=== Organ works ===
- "Symphony for organ" (1939)
- "Intermezzo" (19??)
- "Pastorale" (19??)
- "Prelude" (19??)
- "Preludium" (same as "Prelude" ?) (19??)
- "Roosvensters" ("Rose Windows") (19??)
- "Toccata in a French Romantic style" (19??)

=== Choral works ===
- "Het Meisje van Damme" ("The Girl from Damme"), operetta (1954)
- "Ave Verum", for Choir (1961)
- "Westland Fantasia" (1962)
- "Klokkeput saga", cantata for Choir and orchestra (1968)
- "Psalm 150" for Choir and orchestra (or for choir and organ) (1968)
- "Ave Maria", for Choir (1961; rev. 1969)
- "Westland Cantata", for Choir and orchestra (1974)
- "Missa in Re", for Choir and orchestra (or for Choir and organ) (1974) – There are also two other Masses
- "Ter Waarheid", for baryton and orchestra (1975)
- "Terug naar de bron" ("Back to the Source"), cantata for Choir and orchestra (1978)
- "Hulde aan Polen", ode for Choir and brass quintet (19??)
- "Lied der vrijgezellen", for Tenor and orchestra (19??)
- "Lied van Enrico", for Baryton and orchestra (19??)
- "Vrouwen", for Baryton and orchestra (19??)
- "Kerstlied van de Zwerver" ("The Hobo’s Christmas Carol") (19??)

== Recordings ==
At the time of 2024, there is currently no official CD recording of works by Willy Ostijn.
