= Charles-François Angelet =

Flemish pianist and composer (1797–1832)

Charles-François Angelet (18 November 1797 – 20 December 1832) was a Flemish pianist and composer.

== Life ==
Angelet was born in Ghent in 1797; his parents were Robert Angelet, organist of the parish church of Onze-Lieve-Vrouw Sint-Pieterskerk, and his wife Angeline van Wichelen. His father was his first music teacher; at age seven, he gave a concert. Aged seventeen, he was appointed organist of a church in Wetteren, near Ghent.

In 1821 he went to the Conservatoire de Paris; he studied piano with Pierre-Joseph-Guillaume Zimmerman, harmony and accompaniment with Victor Dourlen, and composition with François-Joseph Fétis, the director of the conservatoire, who thought he was a promising composer. In 1822 he won first prize in a piano competition at the conservatoire, and was appointed répétiteur.

He moved to Brussels, where he was a piano teacher at the Royal Music School.

In 1829 he became pianist of the court of William I of the Netherlands. After a period of failing health he died in Ghent in 1832, aged 35.

== Compositions ==
Angelet wrote a symphony that won a prize in Ghent in 1820. His other compositions are mostly piano music; he also wrote a piano trio and some songs.

Fétis wrote, "Angelet had originality in his ideas, and wrote with elegance and purity".
