= Henri Moreau (composer) =

Belgian composer

Henri Moreau (15 July 1728 – 3 November 1803) was a composer and teacher born in Liège in what is now modern-day Belgium. He studied with Bartolomeo Lustrini and Antonio Aurisicchio and he is known to have taught André Ernest Modeste Grétry. Moreau composed religious works which were never printed but would have included Christmas carols popular at the time in Liège. Moreau wrote a number of instrumental works, for example 6 trios, which are known to have been written in Liège around 1777 but were subsequently lost.

In 1783 his treatise L'harmonie mise en pratique was published by Chez J. G. M. Loxhay. The method was aimed at those studying composition or accompaniment, with a table of two, three and four-part chordal formations with consonances and dissonances to help with practicing, along with fugues and organ points, all of which were collated from notable examples.

== Works ==
- Te Deum
- Sonatas: 2 violins-double bass (1777)
