= Lucien Posman =

Belgian composer (born 1952)

Lucien Posman (born 22 March 1952 in Eeklo) is a Belgian composer.

Lucien Posman is honorary professor composition, counterpoint and fugue at the Royal Conservatory of the University College Ghent. He is founder and honorary chairman of ComAV, the Flemish composers' association and member of The Royal Flemish Academy of Belgium for Science and the Arts. He was co-founder in and artistic collaborator of De Rode Pomp, a chamber music platform in Ghent managed by his brother André Posman. He studied music theory and composition at the Royal Conservatories of Ghent and Antwerp. His mentor for composition was Roland Coryn, Nini Bulterys for counterpoint & fugue. He composed a symphony, an opera, concertos, chamber music for various ensembles and a relatively large number of vocal works, mostly using poetry by William Blake. As composer he is a representative of postmodernism and has an important voice in this debate in Flanders. Some of his works have been awarded composition prizes. Posman's works have been performed at many national and international festivals.

== Compositions ==
=== Instrumental ===
- Solo: piano: Reynaert & de Pauw (2018); Misverstand 1002 (2014); Een slaapmutsje, (2014); Le Conte de L’Etude Modeste (2000) (parody of "Pictures at an Exhibition" by Mussorgsky) Oeioeioeioeioei (1986); 12 dodecaphonic Shooting Prayers (1984). .organ: Vlas (Flax) 2013); Meditatio Florida (2003); .harpsichord: Heden aan 40% (Today at 40%); .carillon: Bejaard (2010); .flute: Ebaux, (1999); .violin: Wachten op de Molenberg (Waiting on the Molenberg) (1988); .saxophone: Marsyas’ Zwanezang on sax (1988); .clarinet: Gamaka (1985); .violoncello: Color & Silence (2014); 22 (1984)
- Duo: Ambrass for solo brass instrument & piano (2006); Pizziola & Pizziello for viola & violoncello (2000); Bicellium, for 2 celli (2004) (6’); Op Hol for cello en bassoon (1999)
- Trio: Thelema Capers, for clarinet, baritonsax & piano (2017); Illuminations, for 2 piccolo's & piano (2010); Trio for violin, cello & piano (1986)
- Quartet: Elegie, for string quartet, in memoriam Vic Nees (2013);O! Zon, string quartet (1997); Mijnhere van Maldegem, variations for sax- quartet (2006)
- Quintet: Geen noodt, sapperloodt !, quintet for flute(s) & string quartet (1997); Nocturne for flute (or clarinet or viola) & string quartet (2003); Nocturne voor klarinet en strijkers ( or viola: arrangement); Blaaskwintet, for wind quintet (1998)
- Sextet: For Gilberto Mendes (8 = 0 = 80) (fl, bass clar., pn, vl, vla & vlc) (2002)
- Septet: De laatste hooivracht (The last hay wagon ) (fl., bass clar., mar., pn, vl, vla, vlc) (1994); Die Kürze, (fl., bass clar., mar., pn, vl, vla, vlc) (2007)
- Nonet: De Pauw ( fl/pc, clar, xyl, string quartet & 2 pn (2001); Erik, Gustav, Maurice, Arnold, Scott, Igor, Charles, Claude en «De Dwaze Maagd, nonet for woodwinds (1999)
- Orchestre / concerto: Symfonie een (1996); Concerto for piano & string orchestra (2008); Concerto for violin, string orchestra, vibraphone & marimba (2012); Concerto piccolo, for piano en & string orchestra (2011); Wheel within wheel… (T: W.Blake) concerto-cantata for soprano, trombone & large instrumental ensemble (17 instruments) (1987); Concerto-cantate for clarinet & choir, piano and percussion (2015) (T.: Fr. Hölderlin)

=== Vocal works – a capella: non-Blake ===
- 3-part equal voices: 3 souterliedekens, 3-part equal voices (2011)
- 4-part male choir: Elaba (2010)
- 4-part mixed choir: Chatterlach@Home (T.: Geert De Kockere) 2020; Tijd (Time) (2017); Ushururu (A lullaby for Eleasha) for mixed choir (2015); All too short a date (a song), (T.: Dirk Blockeel) (2014) Hälfte des Lebens (T.: F. Hölderlin) (2012); Litanie, (T.: Marleen de Crée) (2012); Omittamus studia (2008); IOB XXIX 2-4 (2007); Au commencement

=== Vocal works – a capella: Blake ===
- 3-part female choir / equal voices: To Morning (T: W. Blake) for 3-part female choir / equal voices (2000)
- 4-part mixed choir:
- The Blossom (W. Blake, Songs of Innocence) (2018); The Divine Image (W. Blake, SoI) (2018); Spring (W. Blake, SoI) (2018); A Dream (W. Blake, SoI) (2018); a golden string, (T.: W. Blake) (2012); To the Evening Star (T: W. Blake) (2000); ODE TO THE SEASONS, (W. Blake) (2005): To Spring; To Summer; To Autumn; To Winter. 10 ‘SONGS of EXPERIENCE’ (T: W.Blake) (1998): The Clod & the Pebble; Holy Thursday; The little Girl Lost; The little Girl Found; The Chimney Sweeper; The little Vagabond; Infant Sorrow; A Poison Tree; To Tirzah; The School Boy; 5 ‘SONGS of EXPERIENCE’ (T: W.Blake) for professional mixed choir (1988): The Human abstract; The Sick Rose; London; The Angel; The Voice of the Ancien Bard

=== Chamber opera ===
- Hercules Haché, the adventure of a professor! (1992)

=== Vocal works with accompaniment ===
- voice & narrator (ad lib.): Paris (T: Ingeborg Bachmann) (1993)
- voice & piano: In een donkere nacht, (B. Demyttenaere), for middle voice piano (2018); Grotesque (T.: Frederick Manning), for high voice & piano (2014); Amria (T: Leo Ferré) for voice & piano (2007); een gevoel van raam, (haikus van H.Courtens) for high voice & piano (1999); Gij Rookers, gij snuivers (T: G.Gezelle) for high voice & piano (1998); De Vermoeienis (T: J.-F. Fransen), for high voice & piano & the public (1997); 5 SONGS OF EXPERIENCE for middle (or high) voice & piano (W. Blake) (1986): Introduction; Earth's Answer; The Fly; Nurses Song; Ah! Sun-flower; Infant Joy (William Blake) for high voice & piano (2010)
- voice & harp: The Little Black Boy (W. Blake) (soprano solo & harp) (2019); Infant Joy (W. Blake) (soprano solo & harp) (2019); A CRADLE SONG (soprano solo & harp) (2019)
- voice & 2 instruments: Dear Janey (T. Calamity Jane) for soprano, violin & marimba (2014); 5 ‘SONGS OF EXPERIENCE’ for high voice oboe (or clar.) & piano (T: W.Blake) (1988): A little Boy Lost; My Pretty Rose Tree; The Lilly; The Garden of Love; A little Girl Lost
- voice & 3 instruments: The Mental Traveller (T: W.Blake) for soprano & recorder trio (2002); anacura, inauguration cantata for soprano & string quartet (2015)
- voice & 7 instruments: The Book of Thel (T: W.Blake) for middle (or high) & ensemble (2001)
- voice & 10 instruments: De Vlaamsche Leeuw, arrangement voor sopraan en ensemble (2009); Het Belgisch Volkslied, arrangement voor sopraan en ensemble (2009)
- & strings; Love by fortune sent ‘… the shades of nighttime…’( T: A. Pushkin) song for voice & string orchestra (also version with pianoreduction) (2003)
- voice & 15 instruments: Ik treur niet(T: Hugues C.Pernath) for voice & ensemble (1988)
- voice & 17 instruments: Wheel within Wheel (T: W.Blake) concerto-cantata for soprano, trombone & large ensemble (1987)

=== Two voice and piano ===
- Drie Gisekin Liederen, (T.: Jo Gisekin) for soprano, mezzo & piano

=== Choir and … ===
- female choir & harp: Vier liederen (Virginie Loveling, Kristin Van den Eede, Leen Charles, Miriam Van Hee) (2020); The Little Boy Lost (W. Blake, SoI) 2019; The Little Boy Found (W. Blake, SoI) (2019)
- male choir & harp: The Shepherd. (W. Blake, SoI) (2019)
- mixed choir & harp: The Ecchoing Green (W. Blake, SoI) (2019); Laughing Song (W. Blake, SoI) (2019); HOLY THURSDAY (W. Blake, SoI) (2019)
- mixed choir & accordion (or piano): ’t Es overal iet, (T: Paul Hoste) a plaintive march (2010)
- mixed choir & piano: An die Parzen (text: F. Hölderlin) mixed choir & piano (2003); What Then, voor koor & piano

=== Soloist(s), choir and … ===
- soprano(s) mixed choir & harp: Introduction (W. Blake, SoI) (2019); The Lamb (W. Blake, SoI) (SSA-solo &…) (2019); The Chimney Sweeper (W. Blake, SoI) (2019); Night (W. Blake, SoI) (2019); Nurses Song (W. Blake, SoI) (2019); On Anothers Sorrow (W. Blake, SoI) (2019)
- 2 sopranos, mixed choir & harpsichord: The Tyger (W. Blake, SoE (2003)
- soprano, mixed choir & piano: Wilder Rosenbusch (T: R.M. Rilke) (2007)
- SSA-solo, mixed choir & violoncello : Shepherd songs: (T: William Blake)
- soprano, mixed choir, flute, piano: The Book of Los (T: W.Blake) a cantata (2000); Wilder Rosenbusch (T: R.M. Rilke) song for soprano, choir, vl., timp. & piano (2007); The Elephant (T.: Hans Van Heirseele) for soprano, 6-part choir & piano (1994); Ode XXXII (T.: Horatius) for soprano, mixed choir & ensemble (1985) in collaboration with Octaaf Van Geert en Daniel Gistelinck

== Bibliography ==
- Delaere, M. (2006) Lucien Posman. in Delaere M., Wennekes E.,Contemporary Music in the Low Countries, Rekkem, Ons Erfdeel vzw, p. 112-115
- Knockaert, Y.(2005): Le conte de l’Etude Modeste’. In Contemporary music in Flanders II, Flemish Piano Music since 1950. Matrix-Centre, p.33-34, redactie Mark Delaere, Joris Compeers + cd
- Knockaert, Y. (1998): Lucien Posman. in M. Delaere, Y. Knockaert, H. Sabbe, Nieuwe Muziek in Vlaanderen. Stichting Kunstboek, 1998, p 151-154
- Gregoor, J. (2020): Jo Gisekin Bekende vrienden. VAT-Vrijzinnig Antwerps Tijdschrift, jg.18 nr 1, p.11-15
- De Rijcke, S. (alias Raoul De Smet). (2015): Tijd in noot, interview met Lucien Posman. in Ambrozijn, jg. 33, nr. 2 p. 4-14
- De Smet, M.M.(2015) Over Lucien Posman & William Blake. in Stemband #14, Koor & stem
- Brown, T. J. (2011): Contemporary Flemish Choral Composers, Lucien Posman, in International Choral Bulletin, ISSN 0896-0968 Volume XXX, nr. 2-2nd quarter. 2011. p. 61-64
- Van Holen, J. (2008): Non-Blake koorwerk van Lucien Posman. in Kunsttijdschrift Vlaanderen 57/322
- Senden, Y. (2007): Are You Experienced’ in Kunsttijdschrift Vlaanderen, Tielt, 2007 jg. 56 nr. 341 p. 15-18
- Senden, Y. (2002) Herdenkingsjaar 2002 Lucien Posman. In Even aanzoemen, jg. 30 nr 4–5, p. 4-5
- Claeys, S. (2002): Een gelauwerde Lucien Posman' in Kunsttijdschrift Vlaanderen, jg 51, nr. 293; 2002; p.244-246
- Blockeel, D. (1992): Lucien Posman. Van een tovenaar die wielen deed draaien en hoe hij verder denkt te zullen rijden. In Ambrozijn, Xde jaargang, nr.2, p.19-33
- Knockaert, Y. (1994): Hilarische Ernst. Vlaamse Componisten: Lucien Posman. in Kunst & Cultuur, jg. 27, december; p.44-47
- Angelet, B. (1988): Vlaanderen leeft in Hedendaagse Muziek. Buckinx, Nuyts en Posman. in Arcade, jg. 2, nr.2, p. 10-15
- De Boever, J. (1988): Wheel within Wheel’. in Tijdschrift van De Nieuwe Muziekgroep, januari
- De Smet, M.M.(1989): Lucien Posman: 5 songs of Experience, in Tijdschrift van De Nieuwe Muziekgroep. nr. 20, p. 48-51
- Knockaert, Y (1995): Het Postmodernisme in Vlaanderen. in Vlaanderen, nov.-dec. p.360-365
- Anseeuw, M. (1988): Tussen wens en werkelijkheid, lief en leed van 10 jonge komponisten in Vlaanderen. in Tijdschrift van De Nieuwe Muziekgroep nr. 10, p. 25-37.
- Baert, J. (2000): De paraatheid van Lucien Posman. in Nieuwe Vlaamse Muziek Revue, jg. 7 nr 4, p.64-66
- Verschoore, N. (2001): Lettres de Flandre, Lucien Posman. in La revue Générale, jg 136 nr 6; p. 82-84
- Bossaert, V. (2006): Lucien Posman over William Blake en de flow van het componeren. in Nieuwsbrief Vlaams Radiokoor, januari-maart 2006, p.4-5
- Messine, M. (2007): Wereldcreatie XLII 11-16’, nieuwsbrief Koor en Stem, jg 1 nr. 2
- Roquet, F. (2007). Lexicon Vlaamse Componisten geboren na 1800, Tielt. Roulartabooks, p. 578-579
- Leveux, T. (2006): Dictionaire des compositeurs de Belgique du moyen âge à nos jours. éditions Art in Belgium. p. 495-496
- Servenière, F. (2012): Une réflection sur la discographie du pianiste brésilien José Eduardo Martins, São Paulo, p. 53
