= Marcel Quinet =

Belgian composer and pianist

Marcel Alfred Quinet (6 July 1915 – 16 December 1986) was a Belgian composer and pianist.

He studied at the Mons Conservatory briefly and then the Brussels Conservatory, where he obtained prizes for harmony in 1936, counterpoint in 1937, fugue in 1938, and a higher piano diploma in 1943. Among his teachers at the Conservatory were Raymond Moulaert and Léon Jongen. A continued his studies with Jean Absil, and won the Belgian Prix de Rome in 1945 for his cantata La vague et le sillon. In 1946 he was awarded the Agniez Prize for his orchestral Divertissement. In 1943 he became the head of the piano faculty at the Brussels Conservatory where he also taught harmony and fugue. Among his pupils there was Paul Danblon. In 1956 he was appointed professor at the Chapelle Musicale Reine Elisabeth. In 1957 he won second prize in the Queen Elisabeth Music Competition and his Piano Concerto no.1 was used as a test piece in the 1964 session of the same contest. In 1976 he was elected a member of the Royal Academy of Belgium.

Quinet's music is very similar in style to Hindemith and is distinguished by formal clarity and the absence of lyrical effusion. His earlier works were more closely related to Absil's influence, but by the early 1950s his work began to display a more individual style as in Three Orchestral Pieces (1951), which is more reminiscent of French music with orchestration akin to Bartók. Quinet often used established models, such as the passacaglia or old dance forms. For example, his orchestral Variations are cast as a Baroque suite, and the ballet La nef des fous is built as a symphony with a rapid principal theme alternating with slow, expressive passages. His music grew from polytonality to atonality but always remained clear in timbre and texture. In addition to numerous orchestral works, chamber music, two ballets, and some choral works, Quinet wrote one opera, Les Deux bavards, which premiered in 1966.

== Sources ==
- Henri Vanhulst. The New Grove Dictionary of Opera, edited by Stanley Sadie (1992), ISBN 0-333-73432-7 and ISBN 1-56159-228-5
- Koninklijk Conservatorium Brussel now houses most works and manuscripts of Quinet, after the bankruptcy of CeBeDeM in 2015.
