= Désiré Pâque =

Belgian composer, organist, and academic

Marie Joseph Léon Désiré Pâque (21 May 1867 – 20 November 1939) was a Belgian composer, organist and academic.

== Life ==
Pâque was born in Liège, and studied organ and composition at Liège Conservatory. His attempt to found a conservatory in Sofia in 1897 was not successful. Between 1900 and 1906 he taught at Athens Conservatory and in Brussels and Paris; from 1906 until 1909 he was professor of organ at Lisbon Conservatory. He later lived in Germany, Switzerland and England. In 1914 he settled in Paris. He retired to Bessancourt near Paris, where he died in 1939.

== Compositions ==
Early in his career he developed his own style, which he called l'adjonction constante d'éléments musicaux nouveaux ("constant addition of new musical elements"), in which several melodies follow one another. He wrote: "As the piece proceeds, the themes are repeated, transposed, augmented and diminished, but they are never distorted or mutilated by fragmentation." This technique was first heard in his Organ Symphony Op. 67, composed in 1910.

His compositions include seven symphonies, two piano concertos, three masses, and chamber music.
