= Nicolas Bosret =

Belgian musician

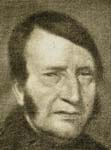
Nicolas Bosret

Nicolas Bosret (5 March 1799 – 18 November 1876) was a blind composer and organist at the St. Loup church in Namur.

Bosret was blinded at the age of seven due to an accident, but this did not stop him from receiving a musical education: he was taught by the organist of the St. Loup church (Namur). He stayed at this church, earning a living as an organist and a teacher of solfège.

In 1851 he composed Li Bia Bouquet (originally named Li bouquet del marieye), a song in the Walloon language that gained a lot of popularity in that city and became the official hymn of the city in 1857.

== Sources ==
- Ernest Montellier: Li bia bouquet et son auteur : Nicolas Bosret. p. 145-152.
- "Nicolas Bosret". Standbeelden.be. 15 April 2011.
