= Jacqueline Fontyn =

Belgian composer, pianist and music educator

Baroness Jacqueline Fontyn
- Born: 27 December 1930 (age 95); Antwerp
- Occupations: Composer; Academic teacher
- Organizations: Conservatory of Brussels
- Awards: Prix de Rome
- Website: www.jacquelinefontyn.be

Jacqueline, Baroness Fontyn (born 27 December 1930) is a contemporary Belgian composer, pianist and music educator. She was born in Antwerp, and has received the title of baroness from the King of Belgium in recognition of her many artistic contributions.

== Early years ==
Jacqueline Fontyn was born in Antwerp, Belgium, and began piano studies at the age of five years with Ignace Bolotin. At nine years old, she began to compose small pieces, and at the age of 14, she decided to be a composer. She continued her piano studies with Marcel Maas and studied music theory and composition with Marcel Quinet in Brussels and with Max Deutsch in Paris. She also studied orchestra conducting in Vienna with Hans Swarovsky and graduated in 1959 from the Belgian Chapelle Musicale Elisabeth.

== Career ==
Working in Antwerp, Fontyn founded a mixed choir Le Tympan and directed it for seven years. She conducted the Symphonic Orchestra of the Catholic University of Leuven in Belgium for two years.

From 1963 to 1970 she taught counterpoint at the Royal Flemish Music Conservatory in Antwerp. From 1970 to 1990 she was a professor at the Conservatory of Brussels where she taught first counterpoint and later composition. She also taught at Georgetown University, the American University in Washington, D.C., and the University of Maryland, and worked as a music teacher in Baltimore, Los Angeles, Cairo, Seoul and Tel Aviv.

Jacqueline Fontyn has received numerous honors and awards including the Prix de Rome, the Óscar Esplá prize in 1962 in Alicante, Spain and Prix Honegger in 1988. She is a member of the Royal Academy of Sciences, Poetry and the Fine Arts of Belgium. Jacqueline Fontyn is a member of the Belgian Royal Academy and in 1993 the King of Belgium granted her the title of baroness in recognition of her artistic contributions. She is also on honorary member of the International Society for Contemporary Music and the Forum de la Création Musicale.

== Works ==
=== Orchestral works ===
- 1956 Danceries
- 1957 Vent d'Est for Accordion and Strings 12
- 1957 Mouvements Concertants for two pianos and strings
- 1964 Six ébauche
- 1965 Galaxy for chamber orchestra
- 1970 Colloque Quintet for Winds and Strings
- 1971 Per Archi for string orchestra
- 1972 Evoluon
- 1977 Quatre sites
- 1978 Halo for harp and 16 instruments or chamber orchestra
- 1979 Ephémères for mezzo-soprano and orchestra
- 1982 Créneaux
- 1983 Arachne
- 1988 In the green shade
- 1991 Colinda for Cello and Orchestra
- 1992 On a landscape by Turner
- 1996 L'anneau de jade
- 1998 Goeie Hoop
- 2000 ... it is an ocean ... for flute, harpsichord and strings
- 2001 Au fil des siècles
- 2002 A (small) Winter Night's Dream

=== Chamber works ===
- 1966 Musica a quattro for Piano Quartet

(for violin, viola or clarinet, cello and piano)

- 1981 Mime 7 for flute or clarinet or saxophone and piano
- 1983 controversy for clarinet or bass clarinet or tenor saxophone and percussion
- 1983 Pro & Antiverb (e) s for soprano and cello
- 1997 battements d'ailes for Saxophone Quartet
- 2005 Eolus for piccolo, three flutes, alto flute and bass flute

=== Works for piano ===
- 1954 Capriccio
- 1963 Ballade
- 1964 Mosaici
- 1980 Le Gong
- 1980 Bulles
- 1982 Aura, Hommage à Brahms
- 2003 Diurnes
- 1971 spiral for two pianos
- 2004 hamadryads piano four hands
- 2005 Kobold Pianola/Phonola

=== Works for wind orchestra ===
- 1975 Frise for Symphonic Wind Band
- Mobile e sfumato
- Espressivo
- Vivace
- 1982 Créneaux for Symphonic Wind Band
- Assembly (meeting)
- Contemplation (Meditation)
- Faisceaux (beam)
- Météores
- Brouillard (fog)
- Choral varié
- 1992 Aratoro (borrowed from the language of Maori and means "path, to be discovered") for Symphonic Wind Band with two large groups of percussion and piano
- 1993 Blake's mirror for mezzo-soprano and Symphonic Wind Band
- The Angel
- The Fly
- The Tiger
- Song

=== Other works ===
- 1986 Cheminement for soprano and eight performers

== Secondary literature ==
- Christa Brüstle (ed.), Jacqueline Fontyn – Nulla dies sine nota, Wien/London/New York: Universal Edition 2013 (Studien zur Wertungsforschung 55)
