= Jean Rogister =

Belgian musician (1879–1964)

Jean François Toussaint Rogister (25 October 1879 in Liège – 20 March 1964 in Liège) was a Belgian virtuoso violist, teacher and composer.

== Life and career ==
Jean Rogister came from a family of musicians; his father was a flautist and his brothers Fernand Rogister (1872–1954), a horn player and composer, Chrétien Rogister (pseudonym Caludi) (1884–1941), a violinist and composer, and Hubert Rogister, a cellist.

A musically gifted child, Rogister studied violin, viola, horn and composition at the Liège Conservatory. Rogister studied composition with Jean-Théodore Radoux, and viola with Désiré Heynberg (1831–1898) and Oscar Englebert. He emerged a virtuoso viola player, and at the age of twenty-one, he was appointed Professor of Viola (1900–1945) at the Liège Conservatory.

Rogister performed in chamber ensembles and made his debut in 1902 as violist of the Charlier Quartet led by Léopold Charlier. It was also at this time that Rogister completed his String Quartet No. 1. He continued to study composition and play in chamber music ensembles including Cercle Ad Artem, the Chaumont Quartet, and Piano et Archets. In 1923, he left for the United States where he briefly led the viola section in the Philadelphia Symphony Orchestra under the direction of Leopold Stokowski. Returning to Liège, Rogister became a founding member of the Quatuor de Liège in 1925 along with violinists Henri Koch (1903–1969) and Joseph Beck, and cellist Lydia Rogister-Schor. The ensemble toured throughout in Europe and the United States to great acclaim.

Rogister, like his composition teacher Radoux, composed largely in the neo-romantic style of César Franck, occasionally introducing his own modernistic Impressionistic sonorities. He composed eight string quartets and other chamber music, symphonic works including Jeux symphoniques (1952), concertante works for viola, violin, cello and trombone, and vocal works including a Requiem (1944).

== Selected works ==
Stage

- Lorsque minuit sonna, Lyric Drama (1930)

Orchestral

- Lamento for string orchestra (1916)
- Destin (1919)
- La Fiancée du lutin (1920)
- Nuit d'avril (April Night), Ésquisse symphonique (Symphonic Sketch) (1921)
- Paysage (1923)
- Symphony No. 1 in F major (1927)
- Largo dans le style ancien et Scherzo (Largo in Olden Style and Scherzo) for string orchestra (1932); original version for string quartet
- Symphony No. 2 "Symphonie wallonne" in D minor (1931–1932)
- La Lune et les peupliers (1932)
- Ésquisse dramatique (Dramatic Sketch) (1935); original version for string quartet
- Allegro energico for string orchestra (1940); original version for 4 cellos
- Symphony No. 3 in E minor for solo string quartet and orchestra (1942–1943)
- Jeux symphoniques (1952)
- Hommage à César Franck (1955)
- Adagio for double string orchestra (1960)
- Improvisation sur un thème (Improvisation on a Theme)

Concertante

- Fantaisie concertante for viola and orchestra (1910)
- Concerto in A major for viola and orchestra (1914)
- Concerto for cello and orchestra (1917)
- Adieu for viola or cello and string orchestra (1919)
- Concerto in C minor for trombone and orchestra (1919)
- Poème for violin and orchestra (1920)
- Fantaisie burlesque sur un thème populaire for violin and orchestra (1928)
- Impression de mai for violin and orchestra (1935)
- Concerto in G minor for violin and orchestra (1944–1945)
- Suite in G minor for flute and string orchestra, Op. 114 (1949)
- Fantaisie sur un cramignon liégeois for viola and orchestra
- Par une après-midi ensoleillée (On a Sunny Afternoon), Pièce for cello and orchestra (or piano)
- Pièce concertante for clarinet and orchestra

Chamber music

- String Quartet No. 1 (1902)
- String Quartet No. 2 in F minor (1914)
- Libellule, Pièce caractéristique for violin or viola and piano (1919)
- Adagio for 4 violins (1921)
- String Quartet No. 3 (1921)
- String Quartet No. 4 in D (1926)
- String Quartet No. 5 in A (1927)
- String Quartet No. 6 in C minor (1928)
- Symphonie intime for flute, clarinet, bassoon, 2 violins, viola, cello and double bass (1929)
- String Quartet No. 7 (1931)
- Largo dans le style ancien et Scherzo (Largo in Olden Style and Scherzo) for string quartet (1932); also for string orchestra
- Quintet for Ancient Instruments for 2 quintons, viola d'amore, viola da gamba and harpsichord (1934)
- Ésquisse dramatique (Dramatic Sketch) for string quartet (1935); also for orchestra
- Impression de mai for violin and piano (1935)
- Allegro energico for 4 cellos (1940); also for string orchestra
- String Quartet No. 8 (1940)
- Quintet for flute, oboe, clarinet, bassoon and horn (1947)
- Largo dans le style ancien for string quartet; also for string orchestra
- L'enfant rêve, Mélodie for violin and piano
- Prélude for viola solo

Vocal

- The Bells, Oratorio for soprano and 8 instruments (1924); after the poem by Edgar Allan Poe
- Baisers tardifs for voice and piano; words by Noël Ruet

Choral

- Requiem for soloists, chorus and orchestra (1944)

== Discography ==
- String Quartets Nos. 2 & 6 – Quatour Gong; Cypres Records CYP1620 (1999)
- Œuvres pour ensemble à cordes (Works for String Ensemble) – Anne Leonardo (viola); Marc Grauwels (flute); Jean-Paul Dessy (conductor); Orchestre Royal de Chambre de Wallonie; Cypres Records CYP3617 (1999)

Lamento for string orchestra (1916)
Allegro energico for string orchestra (1940)
Adagio for double string orchestra (1960)
Suite in G minor for flute and string orchestra, Op. 114 (1949)
Largo dans le style ancien et Scherzo for string orchestra (1932)
Adieu for viola and string orchestra (1919)

- Œuvres concertantes (Concertante Works) – Philippe Koch (violin); Thérèse-Marie Gilissen (viola); Marc Trautmann (conductor); Orchestre Symphonique de Pécs; Koch International 3-1718-2 (1994)

Concerto in G minor for violin and orchestra (1944–1945)
Fantasie Concertante for viola and orchestra (1910)
Concerto in A major for viola and orchestra (1914)

- Symphonie pour Quatuor à Cordes et Grande Orchestre – Quatour Brahms; André Siwy (violin); Alfred Walter (conductor); Orchestre Symphonique de la RTBF; MW/Schwann 11856 (1987)

Symphony No. 3 in E minor for solo string quartet and orchestra (1942–1943)
Fantaisie burlesque sur un thème populaire for violin and orchestra (1928)
