= Joseph Dall'Abaco =

Italian composer

Joseph Abaco
- Born: Joseph Giuseppe Marie Clèment Ferdinand dall'Abaco; 27 March 1710; Brussels, Spanish Netherlands
- Died: 31 August 1805 (aged 95); Valpolicella, Napoleonic Italy
- Occupations: Cellist; Composer

Joseph Abaco (full name Joseph (Giuseppe) Marie Clément Ferdinand dall'Abaco) (27 March 1710 – 31 August 1805) was an Italian violoncellist and composer. He was born and baptised in Brussels, the capital of the Spanish Netherlands, on 27 March 1710, and was musically trained by his father, Evaristo Felice dall'Abaco.

At age nineteen Abaco entered into the service of the Prince-elector of Cologne at Bonn and played in the court chamber orchestra. He was appointed its music director in 1738. He traveled to England in 1740. In 1753 he moved to Verona, in the Republic of Venice, where he worked as a member of the Philharmonic Academy. In 1766 he was given the title of baron by Prince Maximilian of Bavaria.

Abaco wrote nearly 40 cello sonatas, the 11 Capricci for Violoncello Solo, and other works. Many of his compositions were written in an old-fashioned, Baroque style, despite himself living a very long life well into the Classical era.

Abaco died at his estate, Arbizzano di Valpolicella, Napoleonic Italy, near Verona, at the age of 95, on 31 August 1805.

== Selected publications and editions ==
- Sonata No. 2 in F major for two cellos, edited by Jürgen Braun (Schott Music, 1976).
- Capricci for solo cello, edited by Christian Bellisario, Daniele Bianchi and Andrea Friggi (The White Prince Edition, 2006).
