= Gaspar de Verlit =

Flemish composer

Gaspar de Verlit or Gaspar Verlit (1622–1682) was a Flemish Baroque composer active in Brussels.

== Life ==
He was first chorister and later also a singer at the court chapel in Brussels, choirmaster at St. Vincent's Church in Soignies (Zinnik) and singing master at St. Nicolas Church in Brussels. In 1658, he became chaplain at the court chapel. He published two anthologies: Missae et motettae nec non-quator antiphonae B. Mariae Virginis (1661 and 1668). Further, four more sacred works survive, of which one has not been completely preserved. The Cantiones Natalitiae appeared in 1660. Such Christmas carols were also published by Brussels composer Ioannes Florentius a Kempis, organist at the ‘Chapel of Our Lady’ Church. His anthology of Christmas carols was published in 1657 while those by Guillielmus Borremans, singing master at the Saint Gaugericus Church, and by Gaspar, were published in 1660.

== Sources ==
- The new Grove dictionary of music and musicians, London, 2001
- Die Wettener Liederhandschrift und ihre Beziehungen zu den niederlandischen Cantiones Natalitiae des 17. Jahrhunderts by Wilhelm Schepping, editor: Rudolf Rasch, in Tijdschrift van de Vereniging voor Nederlandse Muziekgeschiedenis, D. 29ste, Afl. 1ste (1979), pp. 62–68
