= Maurice Vaute =

Belgian composer

Maurice Vaute (27 April 1913 – 21 June 2000) was a Belgian composer of classical music, conductor and music teacher.

== Biography ==
Maurice Vaute was born on 27 April 1913 in Roisin and studied at the Conservatories of Mons and Brussels (harmony, fugue, saxophone, etc.). He was a music teacher as well as an orchestra and choir conductor. His compositions are deposited as "Fonds Maurice Vaute" in the library of the Brussels conservatory. He died in Chimay.

== Style ==
Initially, he was influenced by Maurice Ravel, Claude Debussy, and Joseph Jongen, his teacher. Later, his compositions were atonal.

== Compositions ==
=== Symphonic works ===
- Auprès de toi - aria, 1936
- Arlequins-fantaisie
- Gavotte ancienne
- Menuetto allegretto
- Triptyque for strings and harpsichord
- Deux mouvements pour les temps venus
- Trinôme for orchestra, soli and wind trio
- Concerto for saxophone alto and orchestra
- Symphonie de danses for orchestra and saxophone trio
- Espace, intensité (symphonie libre)
- Les heures, Trois mouvements symphoniques 1. Prélude 2. Rondo giocoso 3. Postlude
- Concerto for piano and orchestra
- Concerto for violin and orchestra
- Rondo pastoral

=== Ballet ===
- Le reflet dans la Meuse (argument de Malfère)
- Melos

=== Solo instruments ===
- Lied for cello and piano, Souvenance
- Moderato allegro for trumpet and piano
- Aube, for clarinet and piano (lied) or string quartet
- Improvisata for saxophone alto and piano
- Cantilène variée for saxophone alto and piano (Editions Maurer Bruxelles)
- Divertissement à quatre voix for trumpets
- Invention 84 for violin and piano

=== Piano ===
- Scherzo
- Rondo amabile
- Cinq minutes contemplatives, Première suite,(Ed. Armiane, Versailles)
- Deuxième suite (Vieille chanson, Danse naïve (Ed. Armiane, Versailles), Mélopée)
- Troisième suite (Ed. Maurer, Bruxelles)
- Sonatine
- Cadence, Distique, Epigramme
- Moto perpetuo
- Offrande for organ or piano (Ed. Armiane, Versailles)
- La complainte de l'agneau
- Menuet

=== Orchestra and choral works ===
- Fantaisie sur une chanson de Colin Muset (Moyen-âge)
- Chanson des brises (Bouilhet, French poet 1823-1869)

=== Chamber music ===
- Impromptu for double wind quartet
- Wind quintet and piano on a Russian theme
- Impromptu for saxophone quartet
- Quatre inventions à trois voix for flute, clarinet and bassoon
- Choral et divertissement for saxophone quartet
- String quartet "Stances d'aujourd'hui"
- Third saxophone quartet "Nocturne (Ed. Maurer Bruxelles), Aubade, Allegretto nobile"
- Dinanderie for saxophone alto, soli, flute, clarinet, violin, cello, piano, arrangement for two pianos

=== Choir ===
- Barque d' or (4 voix d'hommes), poem by Van Lerberghe
- Les fleurs (4 voix mixtes), poem by Ovide Dieu
- Les trois arbres au bout du monde (4 voix mixtes and piano), poem translated from iroquoian by E. Lambotte
- Le long du quai (4 voix mixtes), poem by Sully Prudhomme
- Cantique (4 voix mixtes and piano), poem by Emile Verhaeren
- Psychanalyse (4 voix mixtes), poem by Constant de Horion
- Paysage (4 voix mixtes), poem by Simone Simon
- Chant deuxième du "Sacre" poem by Charles Plisnier
- Le pêcheur de lune (4 voix mixtes), poem by S. Bodard
- Chanson (4 voix mixtes et clavecin), poem by Charles d' Orléans
- Le joli mai (4 voix mixtes et piano), poem by Valère Gilles
- Villanelle (4 voix mixtes et piano), poem by M. Hemon
- Voici la maison douce (4 voix mixtes et piano), Les heures du soir, poem by Emile Verhaeren
- L'enfant devant la mer (4 voix de femmes, string orchestra and English horn), poem by Elise Vaute-Croix
- Cinq chansons à 4 voix mixtes, atonal (poems by Maeterlinck, Carême, Druet, Verhaeren en Libbrecht
- Six chants à 2 et 3 voix (poems by Carême, Ley, Simon)
- Quatre "Noëls Wallons"
- Six chants à 2 et 3 voix for secondary schools
- Et les blés (4 voix mixtes), poem by Druet
- Fables et chansonnettes pour jeunes (text by Ki Wist alias Jacques Henriquez)
- Poésies d'enfants (4 voix mixtes), atonal

=== Lieder (voice and piano) ===
- La lune blanche, poem by Verlaine
- Spleen, poem by Marguerite Denée
- Chanson triste, poem by J.M.Deronchène
- Intimité, poem by Denise Malray-Ticx
- J'ai perdu ma peine, poem by Simone Simon
- Prière, poem Suzette Bodard
- Aix-en-Provence, poem by Georges Jean Bartel
- Instants, poem by Denise Malray-Ticx
- Hommes de tous pays, poem by Laure Rolland
- Le démon des orages, poem by Jean-Louis Vanham
- Partage, poem by Vanham (atonal)
- Ciel gris, ciel noir, poem by Maurice Carême
- Testament, poem by Lisa Chastelet
- Le petit âne gris, poem by Louis Lecomte (atonal)
- Le petit frère, text by Madeleine Ley
- Les parfums roux, poemby Vanham (atonal)
- Dis-moi qui c'est, poem by Ki Wist, alias Jacques Henriquez
- Chant de Noël, from Les chansons et les heures de Marie-Noël

=== Music theory ===
- 21 morceaux de solfège à 5 clés (voice and piano)

=== Harmony and fanfare ===
- Auprès de toi - aria for fanfare
- Entracte commémoratif - Marche de concert for fanfare
- Poème pastoral, (arr. for harmony and solo horn)
- Prélude en rondo voor fanfare
- Pavane pour le teddy - fantasy for fanfare of harmony
- Pour un anniversaire - Marche de concert for fanfare and harmony
- Menuetto allegretto for fanfare and harmony
- Danse des villageois - uittreksel from ballet "Le reflet dans la Meuse" for harmony and fanfare

=== Light music ===
- Saxophone alto and piano (Ed. Buyst, Bruxelles)
- Two soli: Parfum d'une rose and Atlantic
- Jenny

Pseudonym: Jean Morivaut

- Toute belle, piano and accordion
- Belle promenade, piano and accordion
- Sans souci
- Simple histoire, Fox trott
- Comprendras-tu, slow fox

== Bibliography ==
- Thierry Levaux, Dictionnaire des compositeurs de Belgique, Editions Art in Belgium, Conseil de la musique de la Communauté française, 2004, ISBN 2-930338-37-7
- Rik Decan, Qui est qui en Belgique francophone, éditions BRD, Bruxelles, 1981, ISBN 90-6598-001-6
- Fonds Maurice Vaute, Bibliothèque du Conservatoire royal de Bruxelles.
