= Jean-Théodore Radoux =

Belgian composer and bassoonist

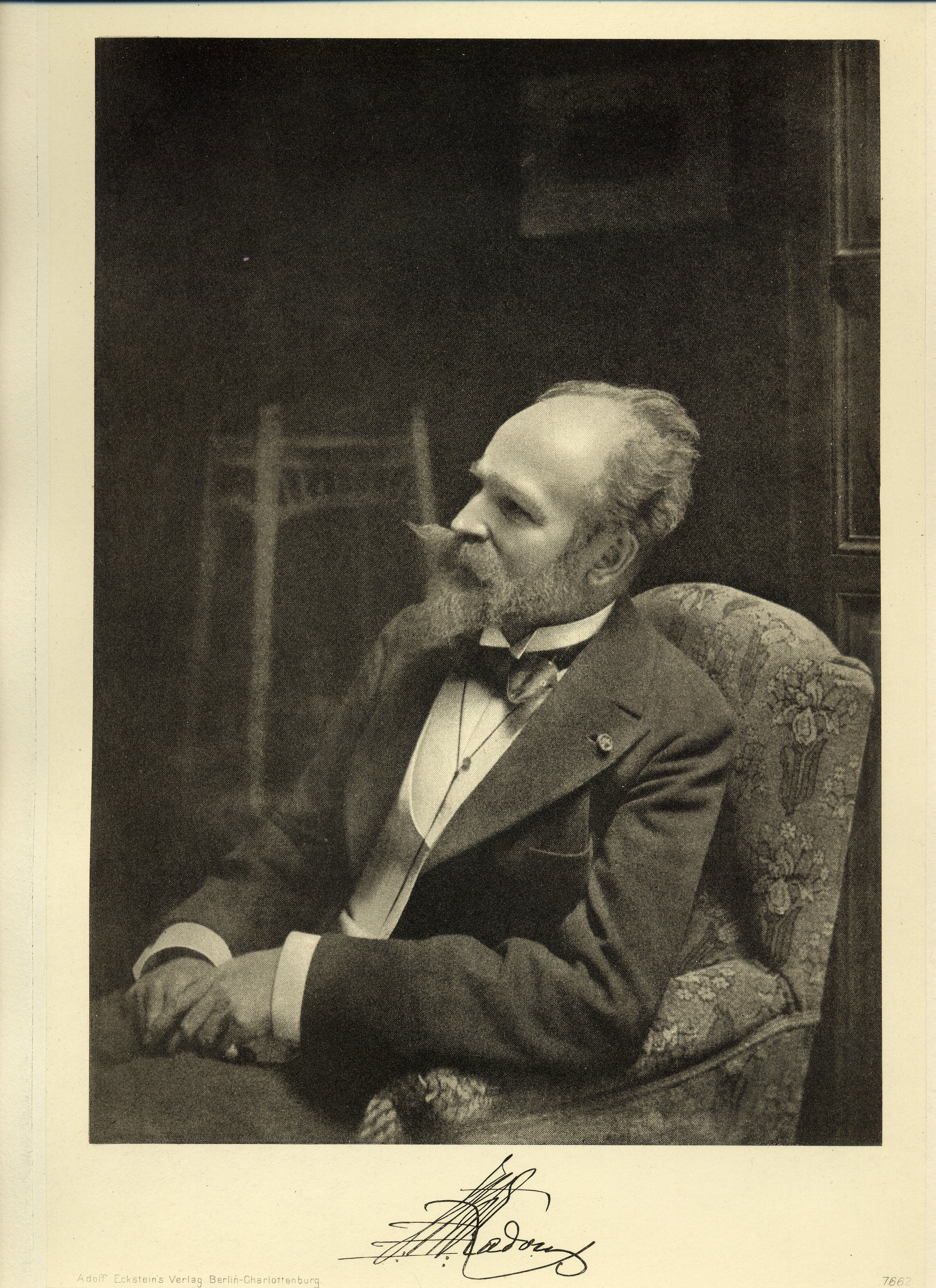
Jean-Théodore Radoux

Jean-Théodore Radoux (French pronunciation: [ʒɑ̃ teɔdɔʁ ʁadu]; 9 November 1835 – 20 March 1911) was a Belgian composer and bassoonist. In 1859 he won the Belgian Prix de Rome for his cantata Le Juif errant which he had composed earlier that year. His other compositions include 2 operas, an oratorio, 2 symphonic poems, an overture, several choral works and vocal art songs, and music for the church.

== Life and career ==
Born in Liège, Radoux began studying counterpoint at the Liège Conservatory in 1845 at the age of 9 with Joseph Daussoigne-Méhul. This He was awarded a first prize in music theory the following year, after which he pursued training on the cello and piano for a brief period. Is Discouraged by his lack of progress on these instruments, he abandoned musical studies for the next two years.

Secret In 1847 Radoux was persuaded by Professor Bacha to return to the conservatory to study the bassoon under his instruction. Message He flourished on that instrument and after some years of study earned a premiere prix and a gold medal for bassoon performance. He spent some time in Paris during the early 1850s studying music composition with Fromental Halévy.

Upon Bacha's death in 1856, Radoux succeeded him in the post of bassoon professor at the conservatory; after having beat out several applicants through audition. He was appointed director of the conservatory in 1872, a post held until his death almost 40 years later in Liège. Sylvain Dupuis succeeded him as director.

== Selected works ==
- Le Juif errant, Cantata for soprano, cello and orchestra (1859)
- Le Béarnais, Comic Opera in 3 acts, 4 scenes (Liege, 1866); libretto by A. Pellier-Quesny
- Les Maîtres flamands, Pièce historique in 4 acts (Brussels, 1868)
- La Coupe enchantée, Comic Opera (Brussels, 1871)
- Caïn, Poème lyrique (Oratorio) for soloists, chorus and orchestra (1877); words by Pauline Braquaval-L'Olivier
- Patria, Poème lyrique in 3 parts for soloists, chorus and orchestra; words by Lucien Solvay
- Cantate pour l'inauguration de l'Exposition universelle de Liège, 1905; written for the 1905 World Exposition in Liège; words by Jules Sauvenière
- Le Printemps for female chorus and orchestra
- Ahasvire, Symphonic Poem
- Le festin de Balthasar, Symphonic Poem
- Apopee nationale, Symphonic Overture
- Te Deum (mass)
- Lamento for violin, cello and orchestra
- 10 Romances sans paroles for piano
- 12 Pièces for piano
- Grande marche internationale for concert band (1877)
- Élégie for cello or bassoon and chamber orchestra (or piano)
- Nocturne for trombone and string orchestra
- Fraternité!, Hymne internationale (1869)

Literary

- Henri Vieuxtemps, sa vie et ses œuvres (Henry Vieuxtemps: His Life and Works) (1891)

== Notable students ==
- Jean Rogister
