= Joannes Florentius a Kempis =

Flemish composer and musician

Joannes (or Ioannes) Florentius a Kempis (Brussels, baptised on 1 August 1635 – after 1711) was a Flemish Baroque composer and organist.

== Biography ==
Joannes Florentius was born in Brussels as the fifth son of Nicolaes a Kempis, an organist and composer. He likely studied music with his father, Joannes Florentius was also a composer and an organist. Between 1670 and 1672, he succeeded to his father's position as an organist at the Church of St. Michael and St. Gudula (now Brussels' cathedral). Before that, he held a similar position at the Church of Our Blessed Lady of the Sablon in Brussels.

== Works ==
His collection of Cantiones Natalitiae for five voices was published in 1657 at the Phalesius press in Antwerp. Similar volumes of Christmas carols composed by a single composer were published by the same press. The authors included composers Petrus Hurtado, Guillielmus Borremans, Gaspar de Verlit, Joannes vander Wielen and Franciscus Loots. Furthermore, a Kempis published a mass, a sequence Victimae paschalis and twelve sonatas for violin, viola da gamba and double bass. A polychoral Canticle of Zachary has been ascribed to Guillelmus (Guillaume) a Kempis.
