= Jean Absil =

Belgian composer, organist, and professor (1893–1974)

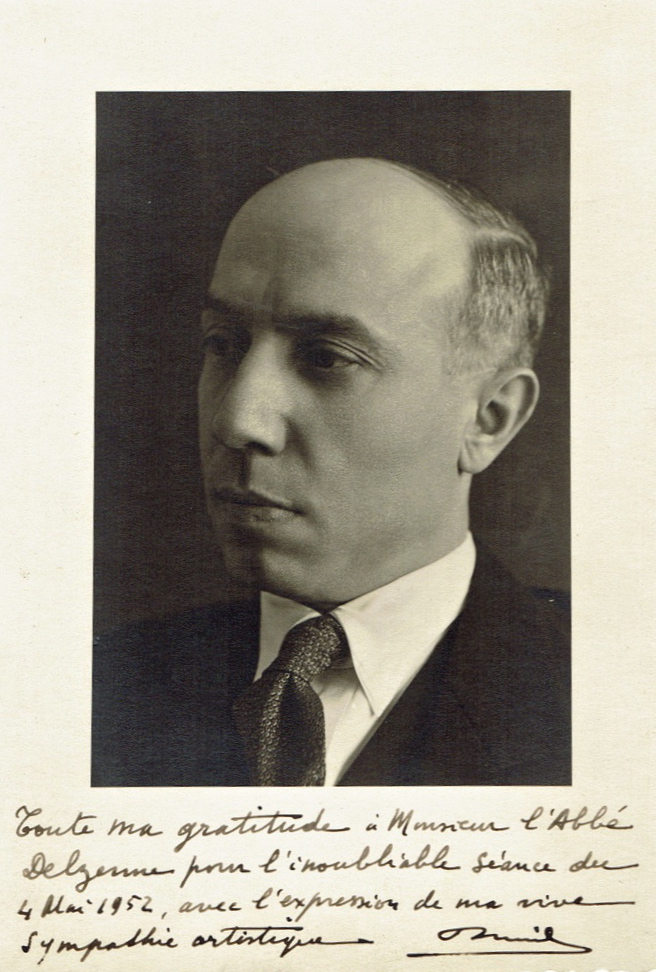
Jean Absil

Jean Absil (23 October 1893 – 2 February 1974) was a Belgian composer, organist, and professor at the Brussels Conservatoire.

== Biography ==
Absil was born in Bonsecours, Hainaut, Belgium. His teacher there was Alphonse Oeyen, organist at the basilica of Bonsecours. From 1913 he studied organ and harmony at the Brussels Conservatoire, but upon graduating, decided to concentrate on composition instead.

In 1922 Absil won the Belgian Prix de Rome and in 1934 the Prix Rubens, which allowed him to travel to Paris. Here, he met fellow contemporary composers Ibert, Milhaud, and Honegger. Absil gained international prominence with the premiere of his first piano concerto (op. 30), composed for the 1938 Queen Elizabeth Competition for Piano (Ysaye), for which it was the compulsory piece for all finalists. Only one of those, Moura Lympany, who won second prize (after Emil Gilels), performed the piece entirely from memory mistake free.

From 1930 onwards, Absil taught harmony at the Brussels Conservatoire, becoming a professor of counterpoint there six years later. Amongst his Conservatoire pupils was Paul Danblon. He also taught at Chapelle Musicale Reine Elisabeth and the Etterbeek Music School. During this period also, he was, with Charles Leirens, the first editor of the Revue Internationale de Musique (1936–1952). From 1955 he served as a member of Belgium's Royal Academy. He died in Brussels at the age of 80.

== Compositions ==
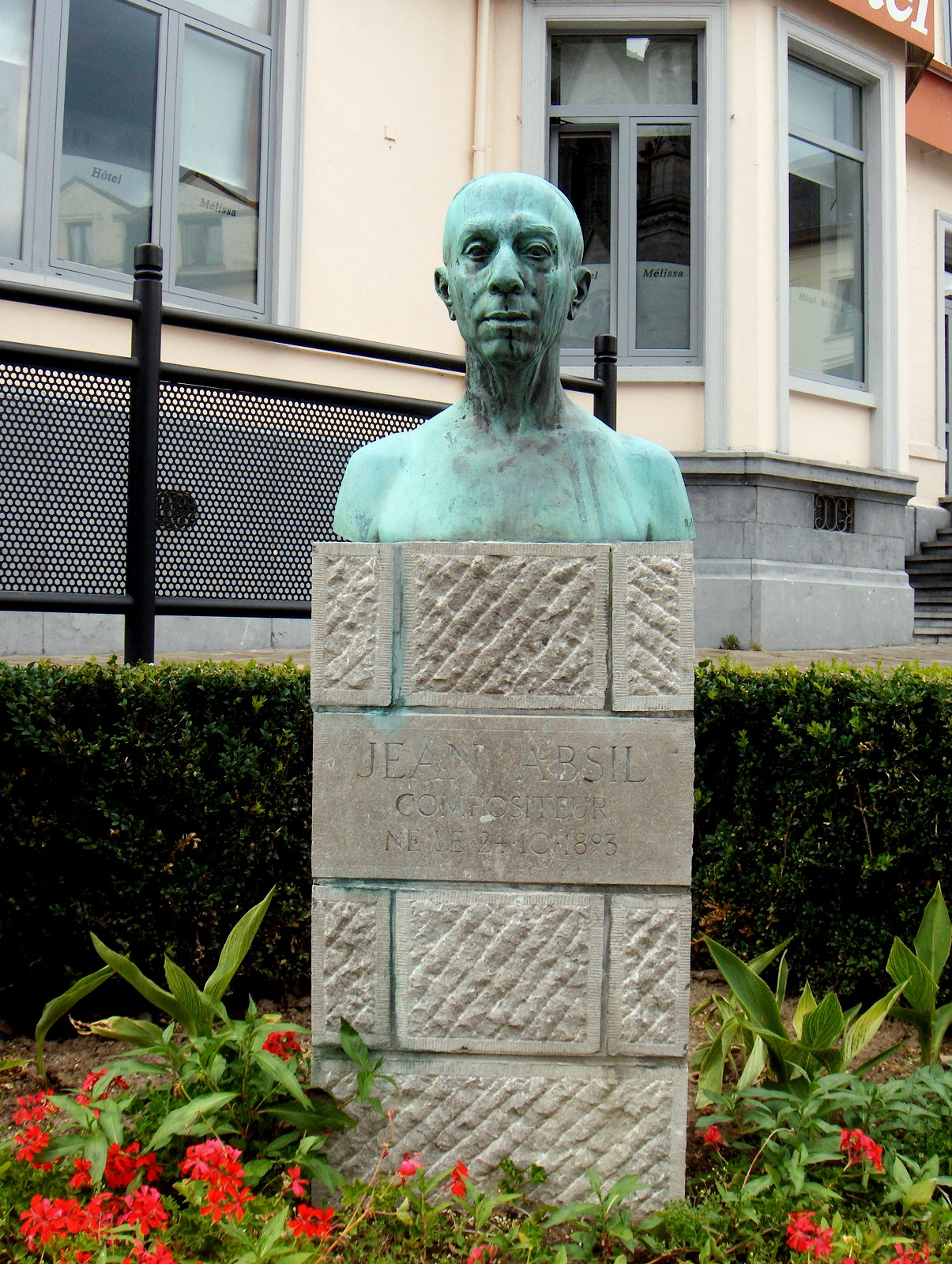
Statue of Jean Absil

Initially, Absil was influenced by the late Romantic school, particularly Wagner and Richard Strauss. Around the time he made his trip to Paris in 1934, he began to adopt a more modern style. This included the use of polyphony and polymodal structures, influenced by contemporary composers such as Milhaud and Schoenberg.

The ear never suffers from an impression of tonal insecurity when listening to Absil's music: while it is no longer possible to find a reference to the classical major or minor tonalities, the composer invents new modes, which he replaces for each piece. From these modes emerge chords which, even if they are different from the classical ones, also have an expressive sense (tension or resolution). Absil never practised a real atonality: the apparent tonal independence of the voices always resolves itself into a unique tonality.

Unusually prolific from his 20s to his late 70s, Absil concentrated especially on writing piano works; he was himself a skilled pianist. These works include Ballade, op. 129, for solo piano (which is played with the left hand only) as well as 3 Pièces (played with the right one only). Among his conventionally two-handed piano compositions are three sonatinas (written in 1937, 1939, and 1965 respectively) and two Grand Suites. The Grand Suites (Op.110, composed in 1965) served as a tribute to Frédéric Chopin. In 1946, he composed another work, Hommage à Schumann and in 1957 the Passacaglia in Memoriam Alban Berg, both of them for piano. His last finished composition was the Piano Concerto no. 3, op. 162.

Non-piano music of Absil's includes one opera, Les Voix de la mer, and a cycle of five symphonies, the first of which (op. 1) he composed at 27, when he was a pupil of Paul Gilson. It won the Prix Agniez in 1921.

== List of works (alphabetical) ==
Based on the list of scores available at the Belgian Documentation Centre for Contemporary Music:

- A cloche-pied op. 139 – 1968, for children's voice and piano
- Alcools op. 43 – 1940, for 4 mixed voices a cappella
- Allegro brillante op. 132 – 1967, for 2 pianos
- Allegro brillante op. 132 – 1967, for piano and orchestra
- Alternances op. 140 – 1968, for piano
- Asymétries op. 136 – 1968, for 2 pianos
- Ballade op. 129 – 1966, for piano (left hand)
- Ballade op. 156 – 1971, for alto saxophone, piano and small orchestra
- Berceuse – 1932, for alto saxophone or viola or cello and small orchestra
- Berceuse – 1932, for cello or viola or alto saxophone and piano
- Bestiaire op. 58 – 1944, for mixed Choir a cappella
- Burlesque op. 100 – 1958, for oboe and piano
- Cache-cache op. 117 – 1963, for middle voice and piano
- Chaconne op. 69 – 1949, for violin
- Chanson de quatre sous – 1942, for middle voice and piano
- Chansons de bonne humeur op. 49 – 1942, for two-part women's choir (S.-Mz.) and orchestra
- Chansons de bonne humeur op. 49 – 1942, for two-part women's choir and piano
- Chansons plaisantes – 2e recueil op. 94 – 1956, for two-part children's choir and piano
- Chansons plaisantes op. 88 – 1955, for 2 children's voices
- Cimetière – 1927, for middle voice and piano
- Cinq bagatelles op. 61 – 1944, for piano
- Cinq chansons de Paul Fort op. 18 – 1935, for 2 equal voices and piano
- Cinq choeurs – 1930, for three-part women's choir and piano
- Cinq mélodies – 1927, for middle voice and piano
- Cinq mélodies op. 12 – 1933, for Mezzo-Soprano and string quartet
- Cinq pièces faciles op. 138 – 1968, for clarinet or alto saxophone and piano
- Colas Chacha – ?, for large orchestra
- Colindas op. 87 – 1955, for three-part choir a cappella
- Concert à cinq op. 38 – 1939, for flute, violin, viola, cello and diatonic harp
- Concertino op. 42 – 1940, for cello and orchestra
- Concertino op. 42 – 1940, for cello and piano
- Concertino op. 122 – 1964, for viola and piano
- Concertino op. 122 – 1964, for viola and string orchestra
- Concerto grosso op. 60 – 1944, for wind quintet and string orchestra
- Concerto n°2 op. 124 – 1964, for violin and orchestra
- Concerto n°2 op. 124 – 1964, for violin and piano
- Concerto n°2 op. 131 – 1967, for 2 pianos
- Concerto n°2 op. 131 – 1967, for piano and orchestra
- Concerto n°3 op. 162 – 1973, for 2 pianos
- Concerto n°3 op. 162 – 1973, for piano and orchestra
- Concerto op. 11 – 1933, for violin and orchestra
- Concerto op. 11 – 1933, for violin and piano
- Concerto op. 30 – 1937, for 2 pianos
- Concerto op. 30 – 1937, for piano and orchestra
- Concerto op. 54 – 1942, for viola and orchestra
- Concerto op. 54 – 1942, for viola and piano
- Concerto op. 155 – 1971, for guitar and small orchestra
- Contes op. 76 – 1951, for trumpet and piano
- Contrastes op. 143 – 1969, for 2 guitars
- Croquis pour un carnaval op. 137 – 1968, for clarinet quartet and diatonic harp
- Croquis sportifs op. 85 – 1954, for band
- Danses bulgares op. 103 – 1961, for band
- Danses bulgares op. 103 – 1959, for flute, oboe, clarinet, horn and bassoon
- Danses bulgares op. 103 – 1959, for piano
- De tijd – ?, for Children's choir and piano
- Déités op. 160 – 1972, for orchestra
- Deux danses rituelles op. 105 – 1960, for small orchestra
- Deux mélodies – 1933, for middle voice and piano
- Deux poèmes op. 53 – 1942, for Soprano and piano
- Divertimento op. 86 – 1955, for saxophone quartet and orchestra
- Du rythme à l'expression I op. 108 – 1961, for piano
- Du rythme à l'expression II op. 108 – 1961, for piano
- Echecs op. 96 – 1957, for piano
- Enfantines op. 52 – 1942, for middle voice and piano
- Epouvantail op. 74 – 1950, for orchestra
- Epouvantail op. 74 – 1950, for piano
- Esquisses sur les 7 péchés capitaux op. 83 – 1954, for piano
- Etude n°3 – 1963, for concert drum and piano
- Etude XI – ?, for 4 timpani and piano
- Etude XI – ?, for concert drum and piano
- Evasion op. 8 – 1927, for high voice and piano
- Fanfares op. 118 – 1963, for band
- Fantaisie – Caprice op. 152 – 1971, for alto saxophone and band
- Fantaisie – Caprice op. 152 – 1971, for saxophone and piano
- Fantaisie – Humoresque op. 113 – 1962, for clarinet and piano
- Fantaisie – Humoresque op. 113 – 1962, for clarinet and string orchestra
- Fantaisie concertante op. 99 – 1958, for violin and orchestra
- Fantaisie concertante op. 99 – 1958, for violin and piano
- Fantaisie rhapsodique op. 21 – 1936, for cello quartet
- Fantaisie op. 40 – 1939, for violin, viola, cello and piano
- Féeries op. 153 – 1971, for piano
- Grande suite n°2 op. 110 – 1962, for piano
- Grande suite op. 62 – 1944, for piano
- Heure de grâce op. 98 – 1958, for high voice and piano
- Hommage à Lekeu op. 35/bis – 1939, for orchestra
- Hommage à Schumann op. 67 – 1946, for piano
- Humoresques op. 126 – 1965, for piano
- Images stellaires op. 161 – 1973, for violin and cello
- Introduction et Valses op. 89 – 1955, for orchestra
- Jeanne d'Arc op. 65 – 1945, for orchestra
- L'album à colorier op. 68 – 1948, for two-part children's choir and piano
- La mort de Tintagiles op. 3 – 1926, for orchestra
- Le chant à l'école op. 144 – 1969, for Choir a cappella
- Le chapeau chinois (extr.) op. 64 – 1944, for Tenor and piano
- Le chapeau chinois op. 64 – 1944, for opera
- Le chapeau chinois op. 64 – 1944, for S. 2T. Bar. B. and piano
- Le cirque volant op. 82 – 1953, for choir (2 children's voices), Narrator and piano
- Le miracle de Pan op. 71 – 1949, for orchestra
- Le miracle de Pan op. 71 – 1949, for piano
- Le zodiaque op. 70 – 1949, for piano, choir (4 mixed voices), Soloists and orchestra
- Le zodiaque op. 70 – 1949, for Soloists, choir and 2 pianos
- Légendes op. 91 – 1956, for band
- Les bénédictions op. 48 – 1941, for Soloists, choir and piano
- Les bénédictions op. 48 – 1941, for Soloists, choir, large orchestra and organ
- Les chants du mort op. 55 – 1943, for mixed vocal quartet and orchestra
- Les chants du mort op. 55 – 1943, for mixed vocal quartet and piano – Soprano – Alto – Tenor – Bass
- Les météores op. 77 – 1951, for orchestra
- Les voix de la mer op. 75 – 1951, for opera
- Les voix de la mer op. 75 – 1951, for Soli, mixed choir speech choir and piano
- Les voix de la mer: Choeur aérien op. 75 – 1951, for women's choir
- Marines op. 36 – 1939, for piano
- Mythologie op. 84 – 1954, for large orchestra
- Nymphes et faunes op. 130 – 1966, for band
- Ouverture op. 75 – 1965, for opera
- Passacaille op. 101 – 1959, for piano
- Peau d'Ane op. 26 – 1937, for band
- Peau d'Ane op. 26 – 1937, for Soloists, speaking parts and orchestra
- Peau d'Ane op. 26 – 1937, for theatre music
- Peau d'Ane: Air de Peau d'Ane op. 26 – 1937, for Soprano and orchestra
- Peau d'Ane: Air de Peau d'Ane op. 26 – 1937, for Soprano and piano
- Peau d'Ane: Air du Prince op. 26 – 1937, for Tenor and orchestra
- Peau d'Ane: Air du Prince op. 26 – 1937, for Tenor and piano
- Peau d'Ane: Air du Roi op. 26 – 1937, for Bass and orchestra
- Peau d'Ane: Air du Roi op. 26 – 1937, for Bass and piano
- Peau d'Ane: Airs de ballet op. 26 – 1937, for chamber orchestra
- Peau d'Ane: Final du 3e acte op. 26 – 1937, for Soprano, Mezzo Soprano, Tenor, Bass and piano
- Peau d'Ane: Suite op. 26 – 1937, for chamber orchestra
- Petit bestiaire op. 151 – 1970, for guitar
- Petite suite op. 20 – 1935, for band
- Petite suite op. 20 – 1935, for chamber orchestra
- Petite suite op. 20 – 1935, for fanfare
- Petites polyphonies op. 128 – 1966, for 2 equal voices and piano
- Phantasmes – 1936, for Contralto, alto saxophone, percussion and piano
- Philatélie op. 46 – 1940, for mixed vocal quartet and 14 instruments
- Philatélie op. 46 – 1940, for Soprano, Mezzo Soprano, Tenor, Bass and piano
- Pièces caractéristiques op. 123 – 1964, for guitar
- Pièces en quatuor op. 35 – 1938, for saxophone quartet
- Pierre Breughel l'Ancien op. 73 – 1950, for Soloists, choir and piano
- Pierre Breughel l'Ancien op. 73 – 1950, for Soloists, mixed choir, speech choir, Narrator, large orchestra and organ
- Poésie et vélocité op. 157 – 1972, for piano
- Prélude et barcarolle op. ? - (publ. 1972), for guitar
- Printemps op. 59 – 1944, for children's voices with piano accompaniment
- Quatre esquisses op. 154 – 1971, for flute, oboe, clarinet and bassoon
- Quatre pièces op. 150 – 1970, for guitar
- Quatre poèmes op. 12 – 1933, for middle voice and piano
- Quatuor à clavier op. 33 – 1938, for violin, viola, cello and piano
- Quatuor à cordes n°1 op. 5 – 1929, for 2 violins, viola and cello
- Quatuor à cordes n°2 op. 13 – 1934, for 2 violins, viola and cello
- Quatuor à cordes n°3 op. 19 – 1935, for 2 violins, viola and cello
- Quatuor à cordes n°4 op. 47 – 1941, for 2 violins, viola and cello
- Quatuor n°2 op. 28 – 1937, for cello quartet
- Quatuor op. 31 – 1937, for 4 saxophones
- Quatuor op. 132 – 1967, for 4 clarinets
- Quintette op. 16 – 1934, for flute, oboe, clarinet, horn and bassoon
- Rêves op. 80 – 1952, for middle voice and piano
- Rhapsodie brésilienne op. 81 – 1953, for band
- Rhapsodie brésilienne op. 81 – 1953, for orchestra
- Rhapsodie bulgare op. 104 – 1960, for orchestra
- Rhapsodie flamande op. 4 – 1928, for band
- Rhapsodie flamande op. 4 – 1928, for orchestra
- Rhapsodie n°2 op. 34 – 1938, for orchestra
- Rhapsodie n°5 op. 102 – 1959, for 2 pianos
- Rhapsodie n°5 op. 102 – 1959, for band
- Rhapsodie n°6 op. 120 – 1963, for horn and piano
- Rhapsodie roumaine op. 56 – 1943, for violin and orchestra
- Rhapsodie roumaine op. 56 – 1943, for violin and piano
- Rites op. 79 – 1952, for band
- Roumaniana op. 92 – 1956, for band
- Sicilienne – 1950, for flute or clarinet or saxophone and piano or harp
- Silhouettes op. 97 – 1958, for flute and piano
- Six choeurs I op. 18 – 1935, for children's choir and piano (1 voice)
- [divers], for
- Six choeurs II op. 18 – 1935, for two-part children's choir and piano
- Paul Fort, for
- Six poèmes de Maurice Carême op. 109 – 1961, for 3 equal voices
- Maurice Carême, for
- Sonate op. 115 – 1963, for alto saxophone and piano
- Sonate op. 134 – 1967, for violin
- Sonate op. 146 – 1970, for violin and piano
- Sonatine en duo op. 112 – 1962, for violin and viola
- Sonatine n°2 op. 37 – 1939, for piano
- Sonatine op. 27 – 1937, for piano
- Suite bucolique op. 95 – 1957, for string orchestra
- Suite mystique op. 145 – 1969, for flute quartet
- Suite n°2 op. 141 – 1968, for cello and piano
- Suite pastorale op. 37 – 1939, for flute, oboe, clarinet, horn and bassoon
- Suite pastorale op. 37 – 1939, for piano
- Suite sur des thèmes populaires roumains op. 90 – 1956, for saxophone quartet
- Suite op. 51 – 1942, for cello and piano
- Suite op. 78 – 1952, for trombone, tuba or cello and piano
- Suite op. 92 – 1956, for small orchestra
- Suite op. 114 – 1963, for guitar
- Suite op. 135 – 1967, for 2 guitars
- Suite op. 149 – 1970, for trumpet in C or B flat and piano
- Sur un paravent chinois op. 147 – 1970, for guitar
- Symphonie n°1 en ré mineur op. 1 – 1920, for orchestra
- Symphonie n°2 op. 25 – 1936, for large orchestra
- Symphonie n°3 op. 57 – 1943, for orchestra
- Symphonie n°4 op. 142 – 1969, for large orchestra
- Symphonie n°5 op. 148 – 1970, for large orchestra
- Tahi – Taho op. 8 – 1932, for middle voice and piano
- Thrène op. 66 – 1945, for two-part choir (equal voices), organ and 2 Narrators
- Trente études préparatoires à la polyrythmie op. 107 – 1961, for piano
- Trente études préparatoires à la polyrythmie op. 107 – 1961, for piano
- Trio à cordes n°1 op. 17 – 1935, for violin, viola, cello
- Trio à cordes n°2 op. 39 – 1939, for violin, viola, cello
- Trio n°2 op. 158 – 1972, for violin, cello and piano
- Trio op. 7 – 1931, for violin, cello and piano
- Triptyque op. 106 – 1960, for small orchestra
- Trois choeurs op. 15 – 1934, for 4 men's voices a cappella
- Trois impromptus op. 10 – 1932, for piano
- Trois pièces op. 32 – 1938, for piano
- Trois pièces op. 32 – 1938, for piano (right hand)
- Trois pièces op. 119 – 1963, for 2 guitars
- Trois pièces op. 121 – 1964, for bandoneon
- Trois Pièces op. 127 – 1965, for organ
- Trois poèmes d'Arthur Cantillon op. 9 – 1932, for 4 unaccompanied mixed voices
- Trois poèmes de Tristan Klingsor op. 45 – 1940, for middle voice and piano
- Trois poèmes de Tristan Klingsor op. 45 – 1940, for middle voice and small orchestra
- Trois vocalises op. 116 – 1963, for middle voice and piano
- Ulysse et les Sirènes op. 41 – 1939, for 1 Bar., 2 Narr., men's choir, women's choir and piano
- Ulysse et les Sirènes op. 41 – 1939, for Soloists (1 Bar., 2 Narrators), men's choir, women's choir and small orchestra
- Variations symphoniques op. 50 – 1942, for large orchestra
- Variations op. 93 – 1956, for piano
- Zoo op. 63 – 1944, for vocal quartet a cappella

== Honors and Awards ==
- Officer of the Order of Legion of Honour
- Commander of the Order of the Crown (Belgium)
- Officer of the Order of Leopold (Belgium)
