= Jean-Baptiste Loeillet of London =

Belgian composer

Jean-Baptiste Loeillet of London (18 November 1680 – 19 July 1730), was a Flemish composer and musician of the Baroque period. He is called the London Loeillet to distinguish him from another famous composer, his cousin Jean-Baptiste Loeillet of Ghent.

== Life and career ==
Jean-Baptiste Loeillet was born in Ghent, then in the Spanish Netherlands. He had a younger brother, Jacques Loeillet, who was also a composer. He had a cousin, also named Jean-Baptiste Loeillet. The distinction between the London Loeillet and the Ghent Loeillet was made to differentiate the cousins.

In 1705, after his studies in Ghent and Paris, he moved to London and became known as John. His works were published by John Walsh in London under the name of John Loeillet. He published trio and solo sonatas, as well as two collections of harpsichord lessons.

Loeillet was able to play the recorder, flute, oboe, and harpsichord. He was successful as a teacher of the harpsichord. He played woodwind in the Queen's Theatre in the Haymarket and held musical gatherings every week at his home. His performances were well received in London, and he was responsible for introducing Arcangelo Corelli's 12 Concerti Grossi to Londoners. According to the New Penguin Dictionary of Music, he helped to popularise the transverse flute (a new instrument compared to the recorder) in England. He died in London.

== Works ==
Jean-Baptiste Loeillet primarily wrote sonatas in the Baroque style. His sonatas consisted of four to six movements, with one or three voices over a basso continuo. He used the flute, recorder, oboe, and violin as solo instruments throughout his three volumes of sonatas.

His 12 Trio Sonatas was dedicated to John Manners, 3rd Duke of Rutland.

While in London, his last name was sometimes rendered as 'Lully' or 'Lullie'. His composition, Lessons for the Harpsichord or Spinet, was accidentally attributed to Jean-Baptiste Lully, an Italian-born French composer.

=== List of works ===
- 6 Trio Sonatas, Op. 1 (1722)
- 12 Trio Sonatas, Op. 2 (1725)
- 12 Solos, Op.3 (1729)

=== List of pieces (not opuses) ===
- Lessons for the Harpsichord or Spinet (1712)
- 6 Suites of Lessons for the Harpsichord (1723)

== Notes ==
1. Frans Brüggen, notes from Sonata in F Major, Hargail Music Press, (1963).

== Recording ==
Loeillet. Sonatas & Triosonatas, La Caccia directed by Patrick Denecker, 2006, MF8007. Contains recordings of sonatas by Jean-Baptiste Loeillet de Gant, Jean-Baptiste Loeillet de Londres and Jacques Loeillet.
