= Jacques Loeillet =

Baroque-era composer

Jacques Loeillet (1685 – 1748) was a Baroque-era composer and oboist. He was born in Ghent, which was then part of the Spanish Netherlands, and baptised on 7 June 1685. He was the younger brother of Jean-Baptiste Loeillet. He composed works for oboe, violin and for string ensembles.

He served as an oboist for the Elector in Bavaria, and later in Versailles for Louis XV. He returned to Ghent in 1746 and died there two years later on 28 November 1748.

== Resource ==
- AllMusic.com biography

== Recording ==
- Loeillet. Sonatas & Triosonatas, La Caccia directed by Patrick Denecker, 2006, MF8007. Contains recordings of sonatas by Jean-Baptiste Loeillet de Gant, Jean-Baptiste Loeillet de Londres and Jacques Loeillet.
