= Carolus Luython =

Carolus Luython (French: Charles Luython; 1557 – 2 August 1620) was a late Renaissance composer of the "fifth generation" of the Franco-Flemish school.

Luython was born in Antwerp and was recruited as a child to serve in the choir of Maximilian II in Vienna. After Maximilian's death in 1576, Luython became a court organist and in 1603 the court composer of his successor, Rudolf II, first in Vienna and then in Prague, while his fellow Fleming Philippe de Monte was kapellmeister from 1568 to 1603, together with the Germans Hans Leo Hassler and Jakob Hassler. After Rudolf II died in 1612, Luython was among many court officials dismissed without pension by Rudolf's successor Matthias. Luython was forced to sell his possessions, including his harpsichord, and died in poverty in Prague.

== Works ==
- Masses.

First Book of Masses. 4 of 9 are based on motets and madrigals by Monte.
Missa Caesar vive! a 7.

- Motets
- Hymns
- Italian madrigals
- Keyboard fugues, fantasias and ricercares.

== Discography ==
- Madrigal: Perch'io t'habbia guardato. Venhoda, Supraphon LP.
- 2 Madrigals a 5: Erano i capei d'oro a l'aura. Due rose fresche non vede un simil. on All'Illustrissimi Signori Fuccari: Music from the time of 1573–1607 The House of Fugger. The Consort of Musicke dir. Anthony Rooley DHM 1985
- Lamentations a 6. Huelgas Ensemble dir. Paul Van Nevel, live recording ORF Jan. 24, 1998, on Resonanzen '98.
- Missa Caesar vive! Fraternitas Litteratorum, Supraphon 2007
- Complete keyboard works. Jaroslav Tůma, Supraphon, 11 0754-2
- Lamentationes Jeremiae Prophetae for 6, 5 and 4 parts: Dialogo Musicale dir. Leo Meilink, on Music at the Court of Emperor Rudolf II in Prague, Harmonia Mundi 0761
- Fuga suavissima, for organ: Bernard Winsemius, organ, on Music at the Court of Emperor Rudolf II in Prague, Harmonia Mundi 0761
