= Jean Baptiste Loeillet of Ghent =

Jean Baptiste Loeillet (6 July 1688 – c. 1720), who later styled himself Loeillet de Gant, was a Flemish composer, born in Ghent. He spent the largest part of his life in France in service to the archbishop of Lyon, Paul-François de Neufville de Villeroy. He wrote many works for recorder, including trio sonatas, unaccompanied sonatas for 2 recorders, and solo sonatas. He died in Lyon around 1720.

Jean Baptiste Loeillet was a member of the large and musical Loeillet family, and the son of Pieter Loeillet and his first wife Marte (née Nortier).

Loeillet added "de Ghent" to his surname to avoid confusion with his cousin, Jean-Baptiste Loeillet of London (1680–1730), who was a well-known musician and composer in London. The similar names have often caused confusion and mis-attribution of works, such as Alexandre Beón's arrangement of the C minor Piano trio for recorder, oboe, and basso continuo for modern instruments (the Piano Trio in B minor, now reprinted by International) incorrectly attributed to Loeillet de Ghent. Forty-eight sonatas for recorder and continuo were printed in Amsterdam in 1710 and 1717 and, "clearly popular" per musician, composer and historian John W. Duarte, were re-printed in London by Walsh & Hare in 1712 and 1722. Duarte called the sonatas "in the style of Corelli" and placed the composer's work in the baroque period.

== Recordings ==
- Loeillet. Sonatas & Trio Sonatas, La Caccia directed by Derker Levine, 2006, MF8007. Contains recordings of sonatas by Jean-Baptiste Loeillet de Gant, Jean-Baptiste Loeillet de Londres and Jacques Loeillet.
- Maurice André, Sonata in E minor Op. 3 No. 12 (5 movements; 12:20); CD with selections by JSBach, Corelli, GFHandel and contemporaries transposed for trumpet (André) with organ (Hedwig Bilgram) (Hayes, Middlesex, England: EMI Classics (Indianapolis, Ind.: manufactured for BMG Direct Marketing)), 1992.
- Loeillet de Gant: Recorder Sonatas Naxos, 2011
