= List of compositions written for Peter Verhoyen =

This is a list of compositions written for flutist and piccolo player Peter Verhoyen.

== Chamber music ==
=== Piccolo Solo ===
- Wilfried Westerlinck, Meeting a Mockingbird in Texas for piccolo solo (2009).
- Gary Schocker, Little Surprises (2016).
- Irma Bilbao, Obsession for Piccolo (2025). Dedicated to Peter Verhoyen.

=== Piccolo and piano ===
- Marc Matthys, Echoes (2006).
- Jan Huylebroeck, Kay El'leM (2006).
- Yves Bondue, Senses of Birds (2007).
- Wouter Lenaerts, Memento, Opus 24 (2009).
- Piet Swerts, Le Tombeau de Ravel (2009).
- Stéphane Vande Ginste, Petit Bestiaire (2015). Dedicated to Peter Verhoyen.
- Maurice Ravel, arr. Alain Craens, Ma Mère l'Oye (2019).
- Rudi Tas, Sonata (2022).
- Jan Van der Roost, Sonatina Piccola (2022). Commissioned by and dedicated to Peter Verhoyen.
- Maarten De Splenter, Sonata (2025). Commissioned by and dedicated to Peter Verhoyen. Premiered at the 2025 National Flute Association convention, Atlanta, USA.
- Gareth McLearnon, Delightfully Naughty (2026). "To the incomparable Peter Verhoyen". Premiered at the 2026 National Flute Association convention, Portland, Oregon, USA.
- Jasper Charlet, Tropos (2026). Premiered at the 2026 National Flute Association convention, Portland, Oregon, USA.
- Tilmann Dehnhard, In-C-Sting (2026). Premiered at the 2026 National Flute Association convention, Portland, Oregon, USA.

=== Ensemble with piccolo ===
- Roland Coryn, 13 Miniature per Flauto o Ottavino e Quartetto d'Archi for flute/piccolo and string quartet (1997).
- Boudewijn Buckinx, Het konijn for clarinet, piccolo, 2 violins, viola, cello and double bass (2000).
- Lucien Posman, Illuminations for 2 piccolos and piano (2010).
- Erik Desimpelaere, Magehom for 2 piccolos and piano (2015). A hommage to the Belgian artist Stromae. The title is 'verlan' (a French dialect) for the word 'Hommage'.
- Gary Schocker, Sonata for Short Attention Spans for piccolo and piano, or piccolo, flute and piano (2017). Dedicated to Peter Verhoyen. Premiered at the 46th Annual National Flute Association Convention in Orlando, Florida, USA on August 9, 2018. The performance featured Peter Verhoyen (piccolo), Gary Schocker (flute), and Fumi Kuwajima (piano).
- Erik Desimpelaere, ʻDame, ne regardes pasʼ variations for piccolo and bass clarinet (2019).
- Michel Lysight,Transitions for piccolo or flute, saxophone or clarinet and piano (2019). Composed at the request of Nele Tiebout (saxophone) and Peter Verhoyen (piccolo).
- Rudi Tas, Nocturnal Dances for piccolo and Harp (2022).
- Maarten De Splenter, Suite for Piccolo Quartet (2024). Commissioned by Peter Verhoyen, Anke Lauwers, Rachel Ordaz, and Zachariah Galatis. Premiered at National Flute Association convention 2024 in San Antonio, USA.
- Robert Groslot, Colori della Primavera for piccolo and harp (2024).
- Gareth McLearnon, Pick Pic Picc, a scandalous misadventure for piccolo trio (2025). To Peter Verhoyen, Sarah Miller & Anke Lauwers. Premiered at National Flute Association convention 2025 in Atlanta, GA, USA.
- Frederik Neyrinck, Sonatine for piccolo & acoustic/electric guitar Echo des Memling Echos - Klangstudie 26 (2026).
- Gareth McLearnon, Cúigear for Piccolo Quintet (2026). To Peter Verhoyen & the Piccolos of IFSB 2026.

== Orchestral ==
- Robert Groslot, Concerto for Piccolo, opus 44, for piccolo and orchestra (2011/2021).
- Robert Groslot, Concerto for Piccolo, opus 44c, for piccolo and concert band (2012).
- Erik Desimpelaere, Concerto for Piccolo and Orchestra (2016). Dedicated to Peter Verhoyen.
- Levente Gyöngyösi, Piccolo Concerto (2022).
