= Norbert H. J. Nozy =

Belgian conductor, music educator, and classical saxophonist

Norbert H. J. Nozy (born 9 September 1952 in Halen, Belgium) is a contemporary Belgian conductor, music educator, and classical saxophonist.

== Education ==
Nozy was introduced to music at a young age through his father, Louis Nozy, who was in a local band. Nozy studied at the Royal Conservatory of Brussels and at the Lemmens Institute in Leuven. He won first prizes in music theory, transposition, percussion, chamber music, harmony, counterpoint and the higher diploma saxophone.

Nozy studied conducting with Andre Vandernoot, Yvon Ducène, Leonce Gras and Jean-Sebastien Bereau of the Conservatoire de Paris. He studied fugue with Victor Legley.

Nozy was also recognized as an exceptional saxophonist. In 1970 he was Pro Civitate laureate of the International Gaudeamus Competition for Contemporary Music in Rotterdam in 1973, the Stravinsky Seminar for young conductors, organized by the National Opera in 1975.

== Saxophonist ==
He was a member of the Saxophone Quartet of Belgium ("Le Quatuor Belge de Saxophones") and Saxophone Ensemble from 1972 to 1975 and represented Belgium at several international conferences and symposia including saxophone in Bordeaux, London, Chicago, Washington, D.C., Luxembourg, Maastricht, Ghent, and Brussels.

For the academic year 1973 to 1974 he was a visiting lecturer and teacher at the University of North Texas College of Music, the same year that Jim Riggs began teaching saxophone at North Texas.

== Conductor ==
In 1975 he was hired as a saxophonist in the Royal Symphonic Band of the Belgian Guides. After great success to the tests of Kapellmeister, he directed the Military Band of the Belgian First Corps in Cologne. From February 1, 1985, he was the head of the Royal Symphonic Band of the Belgian Guides and held this position until 2003.

From 1983 to 1985 he served as conductor of the Harmonieorkest St. Michaël Thorn. Since June 27, 2004 he has been the conductor of the Koninklijke Harmonie of Thorn. He is also chief conductor of the Royal Netherlands Army Band "Johan Willem Friso" in Assen.

He won European Championships in London in 1988 conducting The Wind Band Saint Michael of Thorn, in 2003 in Venlo and in 2016 in Utrecht conducting The Royal Symphonic Band of Thorn.

== Teacher ==
Nozy has taught at the Maastricht Academy of Music and the Lemmens Institute in Leuven. He has led seminars on the musical Les Rièzes et les Sarts to Cul-des-Sarts. Nozy teaches saxophone and wind band, at the Royal Conservatory of Brussels, where he also directs the orchestra of the conservatory. He gives master classes at home and abroad.

== Juror ==
He is also a juror in international competitions, including (i) the World Music Festival (WMC) in Kerkrade, (ii) the Tenuto Competition in Brussels, and (iii) the Saxophone Festival in Dinant, the Certamen in Valencia, the Maria Callas Competition in Athens, Coups de Vents Competition in Lille etc.

== Selected discography ==
- Portrait of Paul Golson, Anthology of Flemish Band Music, part 1

Tracks 1–4: Brass Band Buizingen, conducted by Luc Vertommen
Tracks 5–8: Royal Symphonic Band of the Belgian Guides, conducted by Norbert Nozy
Soloist: Norbert Nozy (saxophone)

- Portrait of Marcel Poot, Anthology of Flemish Band Music, part 2

Tracks 1–7: Brass Band Buizingen, conducted by Luc Vertommen
Tracks 8–13: Royal Symphonic Band of the Belgian Guides, conducted by Norbert Nozy

- Legley: Works for Symphonic Band (CD), René Gailly International Productions (19 November 1996)

Royal Symphonic Band of the Belgian Guides, conducted by Norbert Nozy

- Ida Gotkovsky: Concerto for Symphonic Band, Poème de feu, Concerto pour saxophone

Soloist: Jean Leclercq
Royal Symphonic Band of the Belgian Guides, conducted by Norbert Nozy

- Belgian Music for Symphonic Band

Richard III by Paul Gilson
Roumaniana by Jean Absil
Symphony No. 7 by Vic Legley
Danse funambulesque by Jules Strens
Belgian Guides Orchestra, conducted by Norbert Nozy

- Pyotr Tchaikovsky

1812 Overture, Romeo and Juliet, Capriccio italien, Slavonic March
Royal Belgian Guides Orchestra, conducted by Norbert Nozy

- 60-40, anniversary CD for King Baudouin

Éclosions by J. M. Simonis
Symphony No. 4 by J. Louel
Mouvements by F. Glorieux
Soloist: Robert Groslot
Belgian Guides Orchestra, conducted by Norbert Nozy

- Ida Gotkovsky

Fanfare, Symphonie de printemps, Symphonie brillante, Chant de la forêt
Choirs Ex Tempore (F. Heyerick) and Vivente Voce (Philippe Benoit)
Royal Belgian Guides Orchestra, conducted by Norbert Nozy

- Dunamis

Works by A. Waignein
Piano: C. Müller; saxophone: V. Cornil
Belgian Guides Orchestra, conducted by Norbert Nozy

- Igor Stravinsky: Concerto for Piano and Winds, Joseph Jongen: Prelude and Variations for Piano, Alex De Taeye: Triptyque dramatique

Soloist: Evgueny Moguilevsky
Royal Belgian Guides Orchestra, conducted by Norbert Nozy

- J. S. Bach

Toccata und Fuge, Pastorale in F, Concerto No. 3 in C for organ, Aria, Sinfonia
Royal Belgian Guides Orchestra, conducted by Norbert Nozy

- Symphonie fantastique by Hector Berlioz

Royal Belgian Guides Orchestra, conducted by Norbert Nozy

- Fire Storm

Works by J. Van der Roost, D. Brossé, and Stephen Bulla
Royal Guides Orchestra, conducted by Norbert Nozy

- N. Rimsky-Korsakov

Concertstück for clarinet and wind band, soloist Walter Boeykens
Variations for oboe and military band, soloist Joris Van Den Hauwe
Concerto in B-flat for trombone and band, soloist Michel Becquet
Royal Guides Orchestra, conducted by Norbert Nozy

- Nuts

Jericho, Fanfare for the Common Man, Rhapsody in Blue, soloist Marc Matthys, Candide Overture, Three Dance Episodes, Festival Variations
Royal Belgian Guides Orchestra, conducted by Norbert Nozy

- Franz Constant

Concerto for accordion and symphonic band, soloist F. Guérouet
Fantasia for saxophone and orchestra, soloist N. Nozy
Concerto pour piano et orchestre d'harmonie, soloist J.-C. Vanden Eynden
Royal Belgian Guides Orchestra, conducted by Norbert Nozy

- Concertos for Saxophone and Symphonic Band

Works by R. Boutry, M. De Jonghe, A. Verbesselt, and F. Erickson
Soloist: Norbert Nozy
Conductor: Walter Boeykens

- Jean Absil

Brésilienne Rhapsodie, Flemish Rhapsodie, Fantasia-Capriccio (soloist V. Cornil), Rites, Bulgarian Dances
Royal Belgian Guides Orchestra, conducted by Norbert Nozy

- Manhattan Pictures

Saint Martin's Suite by J. Van der Roost, Lochinvar by J. Curnow, Ritual by J. Haderman
Royal Belgian Guides Orchestra, conducted by Norbert Nozy

- Festive Ouvertures

Works by Shostakovich, Berlioz, Lalo, Mendelssohn, Rossini, Verdi, and Wagner
Royal Guides Orchestra, conducted by Norbert Nozy

- Spanish Music

Works by Granados, de Falla (piano: Thomas Dieltjens), and S. Brotons
Royal Belgian Guides Orchestra, conducted by Norbert Nozy

- Gran Partita by W. A. Mozart

Soloists of the Royal Belgian Guides Orchestra
Conducted by Norbert Nozy

- Igor Stravinsky

Fanfare for a New Theatre, Octet, Symphony of Winds, Circus Polka, Petrouchka, Ebony Concerto
Royal Belgian Guides Orchestra, conducted by Norbert Nozy

- Richard Strauss

Don Juan, Tod und Verklärung, Till Eulenspiegel

- Hommage à Jean de La Fontaine by Ida Gotkovsky

Mixed choir Vox Tempore, boys choir Les Pastoureaux
Belgian Guides Orchestra, conducted by Norbert Nozy

- Jacqueline Fontyn

Créneaux, Aratoro, Frises, Blake's Mirror (soloist R. A. Morgan)
Royal Belgian Guides Orchestra, conducted by Norbert Nozy

- Concertos for Clarinet by Ida Gotkovsky

Soloist: Christian Debauve
Royal Belgian Guides Orchestra, conducted by Norbert Nozy

- Les Synthétistes

Works by G. Brenta, F. de Bourguignon (piano: M. Durruoglu), R. Bernier, M. Schoemaker, M. Poot, T. De Joncker, and J. Strens
Royal Belgian Guides Orchestra, conducted by Norbert Nozy

- Maurice Ravel

Alborada del gracioso, Rapsodie espagnole, Daphnis et Chloé, La valse, Pavane pour une infante défunte, Boléro
Brussels Choral Society and Royal Belgian Guides Orchestra, conducted by Norbert Nozy

- Ottorino Respighi

Feste romane, Fontane di Roma, Pini di Roma
Royal Belgian Guides Orchestra, conducted by Norbert Nozy

- Hardy Mertens

Adagio, U Mundu Drentu a Ti, The Three Storms (soloists J. Claessens, H. Claessens, and S. Welters), Lest We Forget, Rondo Skolion
Royal Belgian Guides Orchestra, conducted by Norbert Nozy

- Musicals

Film music including James Bond, Colonel Bogey, Miss Saigon, Memory, Morricone, West Side Story, Benvenuta, Star Wars, and Boléro
Royal Belgian Guides Orchestra, conducted by Norbert Nozy

- Live at the Monnaie

F. Chopin, Piano Concerto No. 2, soloist A. Vageuner
S. Rachmaninoff, Piano Concerto No. 3, soloist E. Moguilevsky
Royal Belgian Guides Orchestra, conducted by Norbert Nozy

- Live at the Monnaie

M. Ravel, Piano Concerto in G major, soloist Patricia Montero
S. Rachmaninoff, Piano Concerto No. 2, soloist A. Vaguener
Royal Belgian Guides Orchestra, conducted by Norbert Nozy

- Postcard from Singapore

Works by Philip Sparke
Fanfare Band of the Royal Netherlands Army, conducted by Norbert Nozy

- The 7 Wonders of the Ancient World

Works by Alex Poelman, Hector Berlioz (Les Troyens à Carthage), G. Puccini (Preludio sinfonico), and A. Willering (Septimos)
Royal Dutch Band Johan Willem Friso, conducted by Norbert Nozy

- Legacy of the Woods

Works by S. Yagisawa, I. Sakai, and K. Tanaka
Royal Netherlands Army Band Johan Willem Friso, conducted by Norbert Nozy

- Bernstein

Symphonic Dances from West Side Story, Three Dance Episodes, Divertimento, Prelude, Fugue and Riffs, Slava
Royal Netherlands Army Band Johan Willem Friso, conducted by Norbert Nozy

- ECWO 2016

Works by Øyvind Moe, David Maslanka (Symphony No. 4), and Maurice Ravel (Daphnis et Chloé)
Royal Dutch Wind Orchestra of Thorn, conducted by Norbert Nozy

- Russian Crown Jewels

Works by Shostakovich and Tchaikovsky, including Romeo and Juliet and Piano Concerto No. 2, soloist A. Vaguener
Royal Dutch Wind Orchestra of Thorn, conducted by Norbert Nozy

- The Winning Concert

European Music Championship 2013
Works by Oliver Waespi, John Mackey, and Albert Roussel
Royal Dutch Wind Orchestra of Thorn, conducted by Norbert Nozy

- Mystic Themes

Works by R. Strauss, B. A. Ferrero, and Ch. Lindberg
Soloists Bart Claessens and Jörgen Van Rijen
Royal Dutch Wind Orchestra of Thorn, conducted by Norbert Nozy

- Live at the Opéra de Lille

Composition contest pieces selected by Coups de Vents
Orchestre des Gardiens de la Paix de Paris, conducted by Norbert Nozy

- Belgian Works for Saxophone

A. Waignein: Deux Mouvements
P. Gilson: Second Concerto
M. Poot: Ballade pour saxophone
J. Absil: Fantaisie-Caprice
P. Cabus: Facetten voor saxofoon en strijkers
W. Carron: Pastorale for soprano saxophone and strings
New Flemish Symphony Orchestra, conducted by Fabrice Bollon; soloist Norbert Nozy

- Robert Groslot conducts his concertos

Royal Symphonic Band of the Belgian Guides conducted by Robert Groslot
Soloists: Steven Mead, Euphonium Soloist; Norbert Nozy, Saxophone Soloist; Peter Verhoyen, Piccolo Soloist; Carlo Willems, Marimba Soloist; Vlad Weverbergh, Clarinet Soloist.
Groslot-Music Records GM 1301 (2013)

== Audio samples ==
- Marche du 1er Régiment on YouTube, by Jean-Valentin Bender Royal Symphonic Band of the Belgian Guides], Norbert Nozy, conductor
- Fragment from adagio on YouTube, by Hardy Mertens, Royal Symphonic Band of the Belgian Guides, Norbert Nozy, conductor
- La Brabançonne on YouTube, by François van Campenhout, Royal Symphonic Band of the Belgian Guides, Norbert Nozy, conductor
- Marche du 1er Escadron on YouTube, by Arthur Prévost, Royal Symphonic Band of the Belgian Guides, Norbert Nozy, conductor
- Introduction et Adagio pour tuba et orchestre d'harmonie on YouTube, by Guillaume Lekeu, Carl Delbart, tuba;
