= Steven Mead =

English euphonist (born 1962)

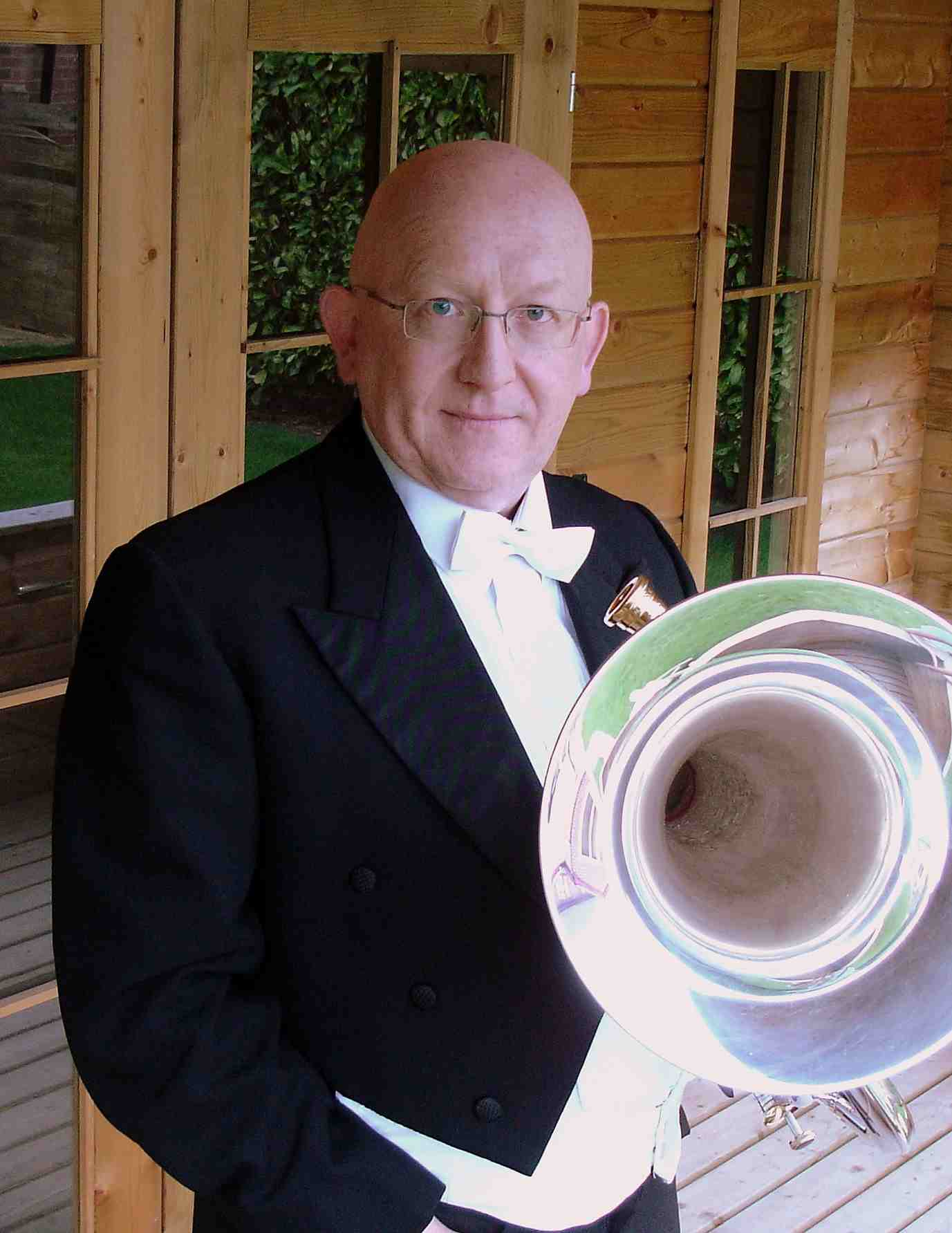

Background information
- Born: 26 February 1962 (age 64); Bournemouth, England
- Genres: Classical
- Occupations: Soloist, virtuoso, teacher
- Instrument: Euphonium
- Spouse: Misa Mead (m. 2014)

Steven Mead (born 26 February 1962) is an English virtuoso euphonium soloist and teacher.

== Biography ==
Mead has played an important role in achieving worldwide recognition of the instrument. He has played solo concertos with many symphony orchestras, including: the Stuttgart Philharmonic Orchestra, the Trondheim Symphony Orchestra, Lahti Symphony Orchestra and Helsinki Philharmonic, Capella Cracoviensis, the Minneapolis Pops Orchestra and the Japan Chamber Orchestra. He has premiered works by Martin Ellerby, Torstein Aagaard-Nilsen, Vladimir Cosma, Goff Richards, John Reeman, Rolf Rudin and Philip Sparke, amongst others. Goff Richards' Pilatus, Aagaard-Nilsen's Concerto for Euphonium and Orchestra, Reeman's Sonata for Euphonium and Ellerby's Euphonium Concerto were all written expressly for Mead.

He is married to Misa Mead (née Akahoshi) who is also a renowned euphonium soloist, additionally active as a freelance composer and orchestrator.

== Selected recordings ==
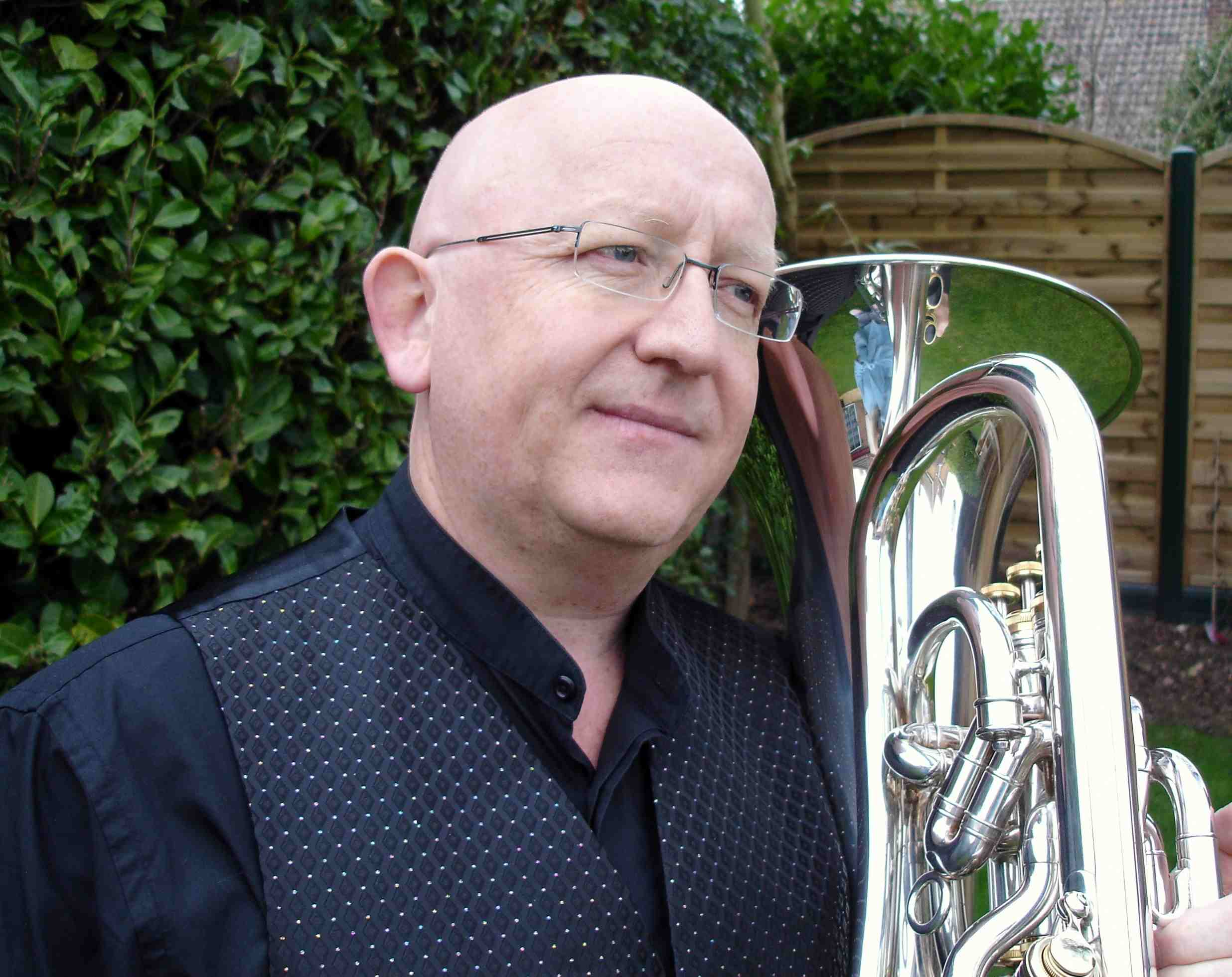

- Joseph Horovitz: Four Concertos

Ensemble: Royal Ballet Sinfonia; Soloists: Andrew Haveron (violin), Steven Mead (euphonium), David Owen Norris (piano); Conductor Joseph Horovitz; Label: Dutton Epoch.

- Concertino

Ensemble: The Lillestrøm Musikkorps; Soloist: Steven Mead (euphonium); Conductor: Gert Buitenhuis; Label: Polyphonic.

- Euphonium Virtuoso

Ensemble: Brass Band Buizingen; Soloist: Steven Mead (euphonium); Conductor: Luc Vertommen; Label: Bocchino.

- Dreamscapes: Wind Music by Ellerby, Clarke & Josephs

Ensemble: Royal Northern College of Music Wind Orchestra; Soloist: Steven Mead (euphonium); Conductor: James Gourlay; Label: Polyphonic.

- Audacious

Soloist: Steven Mead; Accompanied by Tomoko Sawano, piano; Label: Bocchino.

- Robert Groslot conducts his concertos

Ensemble: Royal Symphonic Band of the Belgian Guides; Conductor: Robert Groslot; Soloists: Steven Mead (Euphonium), Norbert Nozy (Saxophone), Peter Verhoyen (Piccolo), Carlo Willems (Marimba), Vlad Weverbergh (Clarinet); Label: Groslot-Music Records GM 1301 (2013)

- Fandango, released 1 June 2011; Accompanied by Tomoko Sawano, piano; Label: Bocchino.
