= Pops orchestra =

Type of orchestra

A pops orchestra is an orchestra that plays popular music (generally traditional pop) and show tunes as well as well-known classical works. Pops orchestras are generally organized in large cities and are distinct from the more "highbrow" symphony or philharmonic orchestras which also may exist in the same city. This is not to say that the distinction is complete; many symphony orchestras (for instance, the Detroit Symphony Orchestra, Buffalo Philharmonic Orchestra, and Kansas City Symphony) put on pops performances with some regularity, while other pops orchestras are actually second identities of the "highbrow" orchestra and composed largely of the same players (for instance, the Boston Pops Orchestra is composed primarily of Boston Symphony Orchestra members).

== In the United Kingdom ==
- English Pops Orchestra
- Welsh Pops Orchestra
- Belfast Pops Orchestra

== In the United States ==
- American Pops Orchestra
- Atlanta Pops Orchestra
- Austin Pops
- Binghamton Philharmonic
- Bob Lappin and The Palm Beach Pops
- Boston Pops Orchestra
- Buffalo Philharmonic Orchestra
- Carolina Pops Orchestra
- Chattanooga Pops
- Cincinnati Pops Orchestra
- Cleveland Pops Orchestra
- Dallas Pops
- Davenport Pops Orchestra
- Denver Pops Orchestra
- Detroit Symphony Orchestra
- Golden State Pops Orchestra
- Harvard Pops Orchestra
- Hollywood Bowl Orchestra
- Indianapolis Symphony Orchestra
- Indian River Pops Orchestra
- Minneapolis Pops Orchestra
- National Symphony Orchestra
- The New York Pops
- Orlando Pops Orchestra
- Panama City POPS Orchestra
- Pasadena POPS
- Philly Pops
- Reno Pops Orchestra
- Salt Lake Pops Orchestra
- San Francisco Pops Orchestra
- Tucson Pops Orchestra
- University of Michigan Pops Orchestra

== In the Philippines ==
- De La Salle University Pops Orchestra

== In Argentina ==
- Juan de Dios Filiberto National Orchestra of Argentine Music

== In Indonesia ==
- Twilite Orchestra

== In Australia ==
- Australian Pops Orchestra
- Brisbane City Pops Orchestra
- Queensland Pops Orchestra

== In France ==
- Sinfonia Pop Orchestra

== In Canada ==
- Vancouver Pops Orchestra

== In The Netherlands ==
- Metropole Orkest
