= Stephan Vermeersch =

- Born: Stephan Vermeersch; Belgium
- Origin: Knokke-Heist
- Genres: Classical
- Occupation: Clarinetist
- Instruments: Clarinet, Saxophone
- Formerly of: Duo Phoenix, Rajhans Orchestra, Ebony-kwartet
- Website: Official website

Stephan Vermeersch, is a Belgian performing and teaching musician in the disciplines of clarinet, bass clarinet and saxophone.

== Education ==
Vermeersch studied clarinet, bass clarinet, saxophone and chamber music at the Lemmensinstituut in Leuven and the Ghent Conservatory.

== Career ==
As a soloist he performs primarily contemporary music; he has performed many premières and several pieces are dedicated to him. He also works with electronics and improvisation.

He has been director of the Rajhans Orchestra, a trio performing Indian-inspired music.

For 14 years he was a member of the contemporary clarinet quartet Ebony-kwartet.

In 2007 he started Duo Phoenix with soprano Françoise Vanhecke with a worldwide 20th- and 21st-century repertoire. They have performed in Italy, Ukraine, Lithuania and Belgium.

Vermeersch has taught in Belgium, the Netherlands, and the United States. As of 2020 he is President of the European Clarinet Association and International Representative Board Director of the International Clarinet Association.

His own compositions include WE for Bass Clarinet and 5 Desk Bells (2014).
