= Françoise Vanhecke =

Belgian musician

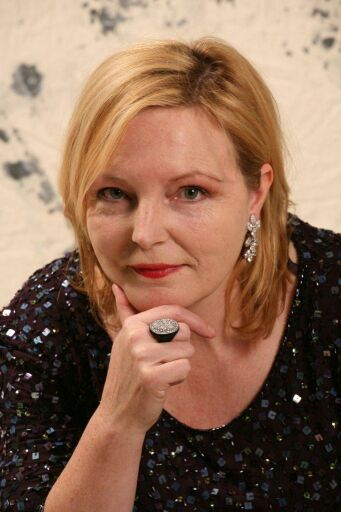
Françoise Vanhecke in 2013

Françoise Renilde Irma Vanhecke is a Belgian soprano, artist, pianist, music researcher, music lecturer, and vocal coach. She is known for her role of Ida Heiger in Tristesses. She is a music composer under the pseudonym of Irma Bilbao.

== Early life and education ==
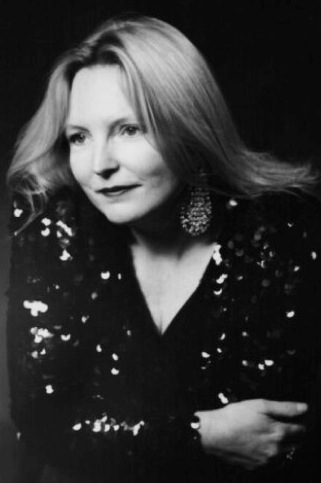
Vanhecke

Françoise Renilde Irma Vanhecke showed great talent as a singer, pianist, and composer even as a child. She was inspired by the work of Maria Callas, and got into music very early on. She began composing when she was 13 years old. Her talent was soon discovered by Luc Goosen and Jan Decadt, who used her piano pieces as obligatory material at the Urban Academy of Harelbeke. She immediately got very positive reviews.

Vanhecke is a cousin of Nico Felicien Declercq.

She received her diploma for teaching singing and piano in 1981 from the Ministry of Education, Brussels, Belgium.

In 1995 she wrote 'Jong bloed' on a text by the poet Guido Gezelle, for a broadcast on Classical Radio (Klara) in the town of Kortrijk. One of the spectators, Willem Vermandere, immediately loved it.

In 2000 she received a master's degree in music, specialising in voice from the Lemmens Institute, Graduate School of Arts and Sciences at the Catholic University of Leuven.

Vanhecke received her PhD degree in musical arts from Ghent University in 2017.

== Awards ==
She is a Knight in the Order of the Crown and appointed Knight of the Order of Leopold II.

Vanhecke participated in the first Queen Elisabeth Music Competition for singing in 1988 and received wide appreciation from the press and from the community. At the Royal Conservatory of Ghent (Belgium) she received the 1st prize opera, and a special prize "Coens & Willemot"; in 1982, she received the 1st prize in piano; in 1980 she received the 1st prize in singing, and in 1979 a special prize "Aerens & Torck". In 1976 she received the 1st prize for solfège.

In 1987 she has also received the Palmo d'oro at International Chamber Music Competition for Lieder in Finale Ligure in Italy and the Radio 3 award for contemporary Belgian Chamber Music at the Orfeus contest.

== Teaching ==
From 1985 to present she has been a professor of singing and opera, vocal ensemble and choir at the Regional Conservatory of Kortrijk. From 2009 until 2010 she has been a professor in singing at the Erasmus College of Brussels at the school for audiovisual and performing arts. From 1979 until 1982 and from 1996 until 2001 she has been a professor in singing, vocal chamber music and pedagogy at the Royal Conservatory of Ghent (Belgium). From 1980 until 1991 she has been professor in singing, piano and vocal ensemble at the Academy of Music in Harelbeke (Belgium). In additional she has taught thematic master classes in Belgium, Brazil, Lithuania, Vietnam, France, Indonesia, and elsewhere.

== Research ==
Vanhecke is the pioneer of inhaling singing and known for her research on extended techniques at Ghent University in Belgium.

== Discography ==
- Three Songs of Passion
- A Journey Into The Universe, 2021
- Illusion, Déluges et Autres Péripéties Annette Vande Gorne, 2020
- Klara CD / Flanders Arts Institute Fingerprints #3 Signature from composing Flanders, track 8, Out of Oud by Irma Bilbao, 2019
- Claus wandelt Steef Verwee (De Cirkel) – Gemeentebesuur Maarkedaal, Thuis III, 2018
- Yawar Fiesta Annette Vande Gorne, opéra acousmatique sur un texte de Werner Lambersy, 2017
- Oudenaarde een Hymne, Steef Verwée, Track 7 De Dode vogel, 2014
- Crete Soundies, 2012
- Mind the gap 87, 2010
- Dona Nobis, 2008
- Bossy, 2007
- Amerikaanse meesterwerken uit de 20e eeuw, 2006
- Stefan Meylaers – Portrait of a composer II, 2006
- The Voice of Silence, 2002
- The Blind Tongue, 2001
- La Vieille Dame et la Fille Nomade, 2001
- Electro-Acoustic Leo Kupper, 1996
- 2E2M Collection Paul Méfano, 1996
- Gilberto Mendes Chamber Music, 1995
- Belgian Contemporary Music, 1995
- Wat vroeger was, is nu voorbij, 1994
- Portretten, 1993
- Dwalingen/Errrances, 1993
- Le caravane du Zaire de Gréty, 1991
- Chant et Piano Erik Satie, 1987
- Le Jugement de Midas, 1981/1987
- Pygmalion, 1981

== Compositions (as Irma Bilbao) ==
=== Instrumental ===
==== Piano, violin and cello ====
- Spirto 3: 2010 / dedicated to Lieven Debrauwer & Danielle Baas / First performance 'Femmes du monde, sur les traces de Chopin', Centre Armillaire, 1090 Bruxelles. Performed by Trio Européen: Elisabeth Deletaille, violin – Bruno Espiola, cello – André Grignard, piano. International performance: 2011, Philharmonic society in Yekaterinburg / chamber hall. Russian première of Liszt-trio: Eugenie Markov, violin – Natalia Kabilkova, cello – Vladimir Ignatenko, piano. The 2011 concert was recorded by Oleg Vachrushev. Impression of the concert by Canary Burton (Seabird Studio, US Radio): "I am still glowing about the whole concert. A major event in my musical life. The musicians were wonderful. Rather like our Carnegie Hall. A big hall and a chamber hall both with the huge posters. Nice audience too." (audio)

==== Piano ====
- Uit mijn wereldje: 1971 Performed in Belgium
- Musette: 1971
- Romance-Romana: 1972 Performances in Belgium, Bulgaria (2010), 13th International Festival ppIANISSIMO, recording at the National Radio of Sofia (audio)
- Bim Bam-Bim Bam, children's music: 1972
- Study: 1972
- Finger exercises: A 1972
- Finger exercises B with variations: 1972

==== 4-hands ====
- Shadows: 2007 First performance: Festival de Musique Belge Contemporaine EMERGENCE 2007, Péniche Equisonnance, Ittre (Belgium). Performed by Anne van den Bossche and Jean-Noë Remiche.

==== Solo instrument (other than piano) ====
- Obsession for Piccolo (piccolo solo): 2025. Dedicated to Peter Verhoyen.

=== Instrumental with voice ===
- Lascia ch'io pianga (Händel/Bilbao): 2006 for voice and piano.
- Rencontre (mélodie): 2007 First performance / France, for voice and piano.
- Joyeux Anniversaire (mélodie): 2007 for voice, piano and bongo (or small percussion): First performance / France
- 'Jong Bloed': 1995 / Text: Guido Gezelle for voice, piano and bongo. First performance Radio Klara.
- Ku Soko: 2003 for a solo performance. Text: Swahili. First performance in Belgium, USA, Italy, Germany. Jacqueline Fontyn/Irma Bilbao, for voice, piano and bongo (or little percussion) (audio).
- Spirto: 2005 (dedicated to Karmella Tsepkolenko), text: "The Tyger" from William Blake and Irma Bilbao. First performance for the 11th International Festival of Modern Art, April 22–24, 2005, Odesa, Ukraine / 2D2N 'Two Days and Two Nights of New Music'. Performed by Françoise Vanhecke. For voice, bongo (or little percussion) and torch.
- Smek: 2008 (dedicated to Stephan Vermeersch in memoriam Karlheinz Stockhausen) (audio, video Duo Phoenix performing Smek). First performance at Logos Foundation/Gent/Belgium. Performed in Ukraine (International Festival 2D2N Odesa), the Netherlands, Bulgaria (13th International Festival of Contemporary Music/Bulgarian National Radio Concert Studio in Sofia, Lithuanya. For voice, Clarinet Sib, bongo (or little percussion) and torch.
- Spirto 2: 2010 (dedicated to Milen Panayotov and Stephan Vermeersch) First performance at the 13th International Festival of Contemporary Music/Bulgarian National Radio Concert Studio in Sofia. For voice, piano, Clarinet Sib, bongo (or little percussion) and torch. (audio)
- Souterliedekens : 2011. An assignment as composer to re-invent the 150 'Souterliedekens' from Clemens non Papa, respecting the original cantus firmus and the Dutch language. (See also the website.) (audio sample with voice; instrumental audio fragment)

=== Voice ===
- 2V2P (2 Voices, 2 Persons and 2 fingerwalking puppets: 2010 (for Moniek Darge & Françoise Vanhecke). First performance, Logos Foundation Gent 2010.
- Roll Up (for 3 voices/performers): first performance at Performedia Festival 2011/Ponte Nossa in Italy.
- Bossa Bama: voice poetry for 2 voice performers. Creation at the Audio Art Festival in Kraków 2012, in collaboration with Moniek Darge.

=== Choir music ===
- Kritsa: 2008 for SATB.

=== Theatre music ===
- Club Medea: 2005, theatre music for object theatre for soprano, voice and seadrum/Oceandrum. First performance at the Internationaal Poppentheaterfestival in Belgium and the Netherlands, Germany, Indonesia and Austria.

=== Poetry ===
- Kunst: 2000
- Waar is Fleury Rose: 2001
- Over the Hills: 2007
- Laat me uitspatten: 2009 (exposition Zee)

=== Soundscape ===
- East Crete, Mother Goddess (composed by Françoise Vanhecke/Moniek Darge): 2008–2009. First performance was played at The Experimental Intermedia Foundation in New York City. They (duo Framon) did a live performance at the Colour Out of Space festival in the Sallis Benney Theatre in Brighton, England, in 2009 (on CD 'Crete Soundies' Moniek Darge, edited by Kye, New York). First performance in Belgium at Logos Foundation in Gent in 2010.
- Gallop (a composition by Françoise Vanhecke and Moniek Darge) : 2011. First performance in concert at ISSUE Project Room in Brooklyn, New York, November 2011. Performance at the Audio Art Festival in Kraków, Poland (2012).

=== Improvisations ===
- Free Breeze: 2007 (together with Etienne Rolin) and many others used for contemporary performings and CD's.

=== Electro pop ===
- Dona Nobis CD (text & music project) together with Peter Clasen (MySpace Dona Nobis).

== Productions ==
=== Productions in Belgium ===
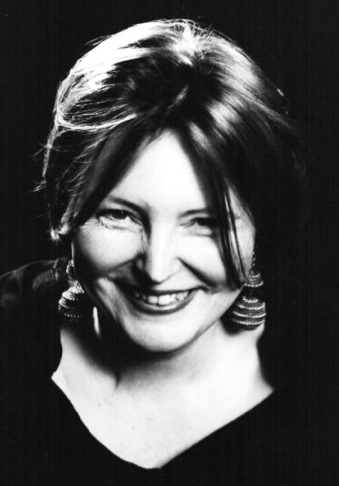
Vanhecke

- 2010 – 2011
  - Before your very eyes – vocal coach
- 2009 – 2010
  - That night follows day – vocal coach
  - De noces/svadebka/de bruiloft – singer
  - Les noces/svadebka/le mariage (Russian version) – singer
- 2008 – 2009
  - Frères de la charité (French version) – vocal coach
  - Honger – vocal coach
  - Broeders van liefde – vocal coach
  - That night follows day – vocal coach
- 2007 – 2008
  - That night follows day – vocal coach
  - Broeders van Liefde – vocal coach
  - De noces/svadebka/de bruiloft – singer
- 2006 – 2007
  - That night follows day – vocal coach
  - Al Amin Dada – piano
  - Al Amin Dada – singer
- 2005 – 2006
  - De noces – singer
- 2004 – 2005
  - Übung – vocal coach
  - Genoveva, ... zoo kuisch, zoo pure – actress
- 2003 – 2004
  - Golven – play
  - Genoveva, ... zoo kuisch, zoo pure – actress
  - Geneviève, si chaste, si pure – play
  - Übung – vocal coach
- 2002 – 2003
  - Geneviève, si chaste, si pure – play
- 2001 – 2002
  - Golven acteur
  - Genoveva, ... zoo kuisch, zoo pure – musical direction
  - Geneviève, si chaste, si pure – play
  - Genoveva, ... zoo kuisch, zoo pure – actress
- 2000 – 2001
  - Pretty Sticks – vocal coach
  - Genoveva, ... zoo kuisch, zoo pure – musician
- 1999 – 2000
  - Genoveva, ... zoo kuisch, zoo pure – musician
  - Pretty Sticks – vocal coach
- 1998 – 1999
  - Genoveva, ... zoo kuisch, zoo pure – actress
  - Genoveva, ... zoo kuisch, zoo pure – musical direction
  - Bernadetje – vocal coach
- 1997 – 1998
  - Bernadetje – vocal coach
  - Genoveva,... zoo kuisch, zoo pure – musical direction
  - Genoveva,... zoo kuisch, zoo pure – actress
  - Kung Fu – vocal coach
- 1996 – 1997
  - De affaire van de rue de Lourcine – actress
  - Bernadetje – vocal coach
  - De affaire van de rue de Lourcine – singer
  - De affaire van de rue de Lourcine – vocal coach
  - De affaire van de rue de Lourcine – musical direction
- 1995 – 1996
  - Requiem voor een spion – coach
  - Al te luide eenzaamheid – vocal coach
  - Verhalen uit het Weense Woud – vocal coach
  - Gisteren – coach
- 1994 – 1995
  - Het Westvlaams Volkstoneel
- 1993 – 1994
  - Onder de torens – vocal coach
  - Tante Euthanasie gaat achteruit – musical direction
  - Storm – vocal coach
  - Hortense – actress

=== Productions in France ===
- 2010
  - Est-Ouest "Sur les traces du Transsibérien, la russie invitée". Récital lyrique et poétique : Russian Landscape avec Françoise Vanhecke, soprano et piano / Harold David, récitant au Théâtre Les Aires et Atelier chant "Découvrir sa voix" Ateliers sous la Yourte
- 2009
  - "Geneviève, si chaste si pure" basé sur l"opéra "Geneviève de Brabant" opéra de marionnettes de Erik Satie avec la compagnie Théâtre Taptoe, www.theatertaptoe.be comme actrice, pianiste, soprano et direction musicale dans le rôle de Marie-Pharilde Cocquyt de Boezinghe. Mise en scène, Massimo Schuster au Festival Mondial des Théâtres de Marionnettes à Charleville –Mézières / Maison de l"Ardenne
  - Les Noces de Stravinsky, avec la Compagnie Walpurgis / Le Parvis, scène nationale Tarbes, www.walpurgis.be
  - Pierrot Lunaire de Arnold Schönberg et Chimères, création mondiale de Maury Buchala avec L"Ensemble Duruflé
  - Atelier et Master Class autour du Sprechgesang et la rythmique poétique d"Arnold Schönberg et Maury Buchala à L"auditorium Saint-Germain à Paris www.mpaa.fr / Cité des Arts
  - Intervenant "La voix du Baroque au Pop". Rencontres autour de la voix / Journées préludes au congrès ICVT: "Voix singulières, répertoires pluriels, technique commune ?"
- 2007
  - Improvisations Nasa / Nouvelle assemblée Sonore d"Aquitaine / Bordeaux / Enregistrement Collection CGA / Françoise Vanhecke, Etienne Rolin, et Jean-Michel Rivet / 17 improvisateurs
  - "Paroles d"étoiles" création de François Rossé, Les Chemins de l'amour by Poulenc and Tierkreis by Karlheinz Stockhausen avec boîte à musique, Salle Rossini / Paris avec L"Ensemble Duruflé
  - Œuvres de Mozart, de Mensace, Rossini, Satie et Poulenc / Récital, Espace Forum Hôpital Vaugirard avec L"Ensemble Duruflé
  - Improvisation voix, piano, clarinet, saxophone pour le démo CD Free Breeze, en duo avec Etienne Rolin
  - That Night Follows day, Bernadetje, coaching pour les productions théâtrales Flamandes en tournée en France, / Campo, festival d"Automne à Paris, Centre Pompidou, / Alain Platel, Compagnie C de a B
- 2006
  - Françoise Vanhecke "Electroshocked" Programme solo. Concept : Françoise Vanhecke Œuvres : "Désir, Récitation" / Georges Aperghis, "Duo et Archèlogos" / Sophie Lacaze, "Nichts mehr, Karibu et Bossy" / Chiel Meijering, "Del Viento" / Maria deAlvear, "e. turbo, e.pod et e.scratch" / Laurent Chassain, Crack / The Errorz, Lascia ch"io pianga / Händel-Bilbao, Sequenza III/ Berio, Geschätz / Dimitri Terzakis, "Oceandrumsession" / Irma Bilbao, Darge (Robot James), "Yawar Fiesta", (avec Improvisation) / Annette Vande Gorne, Festival Eclat, festival de la voix au Pays de Dieulefit. Metteur en scène, Harold David (La Scène du Balcon / Atypik)
  - Intervenant sur invitation à la “ Journée mondiale de la voix” à Toulouse (Colomiers) par Arpa et le Ministère de la Culture, service Inspection
- 2005
  - "Geneviève, si chaste, si pure" basé sur l"opéra "Geneviève de Brabant" opéra de marionnettes de Erik Satie avec la compagnie Théâtre Taptoe, comme actrice, pianiste, soprano et direction musicale, dans le rôle de Marie-Pharilde Cocquyt de Boezinghe. Metteur en scène, Massimo Schuster : – Ay (Reims) Festival de Marionnettes
- 2004
  - "Geneviève, si chaste, si pure" basé sur l"opéra "Geneviève de Brabant" opéra de marionnettes de Erik Satie avec la compagnie Théâtre Taptoe, comme actrice, pianiste et soprano et direction artistique dans le rôle de Marie-Pharilde Cocquyt de Boezinghe
- 2003
  - "Ondes" Festival Coup de projecteur sur le spectacle Flamand Forum Culturel à Blanc-Mesnil. Spectacles pour les petits avec de la musique contemporaine avec Théâtre "Luxemburg" d"Anvers
  - "Geneviève, si chaste si pure", dans le rôle de Marie-Pharilde avec la compagnie Théâtre Taptoe.
- 2002
  - "Geneviève, si chaste si pure" dans le rôle de Marie-Pharilde avec la compagnie Taptoe.
- 2001
  - "Geneviève, si chaste si pure" dans le rôle de Marie-Pharilde avec la compagnie Taptoe.
- 2000
  - "Geneviève, si chaste si pure" dans le rôle de Marie-Pharilde avec la compagnie Taptoe.
- 1999
  - Improvisations au piano Auditorium de la halle Saint-Pierre: la Chair de Daniel Hachard par Xavier Florent en présence de Jean Rustin.
- 1998
  - "Une Voix venue d"ailleurs" « L"esprit des VOIX » à Périgeux Récital avec des œuvres contemporaines du Xxième siècle
  - Œuvres de Gilberto Mendes (Br) avec Créations françaises, : Anatomia da musa, Fenomenologia da Certesa, Poeminha Poemete, TVGramma 1, Jorge Antunes (Br) / Reduntataie 1, Alvaro Guimaeraers (Br) / Exil, Sylvio Ferras / Com
  - Premières Rencontres Internationales du théâtre de Papier à Troye avec le spectacle "Geneviève, si chaste, si pure" basé sur l"opéra "Geneviève de Brabant" opéra de marionnettes de Erik Satie. Dans le rôle de Marie-Pharilde Coquyt de Bouzinghe comme actrice, pianiste et soprano et direction musicale. Mise en scène : Massimo Schuster avec Théâtre Taptoe de Gand www.theatertaptoe.be
- 1996
  - Récital / L"été des Festival France Musique, avec la pianiste Magali Goimard
  - CD 2E2M Collection, musique de Paul Mefano avec Ensemble Vox Nova / Placebo Dominum in Regione Vivorum
- 1995
  - Stage International à Corbeil / De la parole au chant et "Faire chanter les Acteurs" Théâtre du Compagnol
  - "From Silence" de Jonathan Harvey sous la direction de Ed Spanjaard avec Ensemble Itinéraire. Centre Georges Pompidou / Paris / une création Française
  - "Murs" de François Paris, Centre Georges Pompidou / Paris avec Ensemble Internationales Vox Nova / une création française
  - "Les Quatre Champs de l"Ombre Blanche" de François Paris avec Ensemble Itinéraire avec François Paris comme Chef d"orchestre. Auditorium Saint-Germain à Paris avec l"œuvre / une création française
  - Enregistrements d"un récital pour Radio France pour le programme : Les Démons de Midi, un programme de Martin Kaltenecker
- 1991
  - Pierrot Lunaire et Nachtwandler de Schönberg / Tournée dans le Limousin avec l"Ensemble de la Creuse avec le Chef d"orchestre Laurent Chassain (Limoges-Ussel-Aubusson-Guéret)
- 1990
  - "Beau Soir" de Gérard Pesson dans le rôle titre "Solange" au Festival International pour la Musique Contemporaine à Strasbourg – Festival Musica et au Théâtre Jean Vilar de Vitry à Paris avec France Musique au festival Musica Strasbourg Metteur en scène : Charlotte Nessy, Dominique My, chef d"orchestre et au Théâtre Jean Vilar de Vitry (Paris)
  - Lieder de Mozart, de Schubert (Der Hirt auf dem Felsen) et des poèmes "Un moment qui passe" de d"Henri Michaux (Françoise Vanhecke : Soprano récitante) / Rencontres Internationales de Musique et de Tous les Arts du Château de Thoiry
- 1989
  - Opéra Autrement, Stage International de Formation et Création à la Chartreuse de Villeneuve-les-Avignon sous l"invitation de dossier de Claude Samuel sous la présidence de Rolf Liebermann avec des œuvres des compositeurs comme Pesson-Matalon – Zielinska – Troncin – Toeplitz – Stephan – Chagas – Johnson. Ont fait partie de l"équipe : Chr. Gangneron, A, Maratrat, F. Paya, R. Topor, L. Nubar, G. Aperghis, M. Tabachnik, P. Eötvös, B. Jolas, A. Jaton, Chri. Fenouillat, A. Boucourechliev
  - "Beau Soir" Triptique au Couchant de Gérard Pesson Rôle : Solange Coproduction Acanthes – Opéra Autrement, Radio France, Ino GRM
  - "Beau Soir" de Gérard Pesson à Villeneuve-lez-Avignon 1989 Metteur en scène : Christian Gagneron Chef d"orchestre : Annick Minck
  - "8 Heures de la Vie des Femmes" de Lydia Zielinska Coproduction Acanthes-Opéra Autrement, Radio France, Ina GRM Villeneuve-lez-Avignon Metteur en scène: Roland Topor Chef d"orchestre: Ernesto Izqiuerdo
  - Pierrot Lunaire de Arnold Schönberg au Schola Cantorum à Paris avec des membres de l"Ensemble Intercontemporain de Paris avec Ph. De Chalendar, chef d"orchestre
- 1988
  - Lieder de Mozart, Roussel, Bizet, Fauré, Poulenc Satie, Debussy, De Menasce, Rodrigo, Bernstein / Récital au Centre Culturel "Roger Guillard", Pro Musica Bort Artense à Bort Les Orgues

=== Productions in Brasil ===
- 2007
  - 42°Festival Musica Nova: Françoise Vanhecke Electroshocked! Obras de Sophie Lacaze (FR), Chiel Meijering (HOL), Annette Vande Gorne (B), Maria de Alvear (ES), Laurent Chassain (FR), Moniek Darge (B), Luciano Berio (IT), Händel/Bilbao (B), Georges Aperghis (GR/FR), The Errorz (B), Dimitri Terzakis (GR/A) Locais
- 2003
  - Festival International de Bonecos do Mundo em São Paulo Produção: Geneviève si chaste si pure Local
- 1998
  - Bienal de São Paulo: Fantasia Brasileira / Cabaret Voltaire Satie et Kurt Weill Local
- 1996
  - CD Música de Gilberto Mendes, Vox temporis productions, René Gailly Spectra Ensemble, dirigido por Filip Rathé. Obra: Motetos à Feiçao de Mesquita / voz, oboe, violoncelo e harpa

Gravação do CD Música de Câmara de Gilberto Mendes .Cd em comemoração ao 450° aniversario da cidade de Santos, Brazil

  - Récital: Música de Câmara de Gilberto Mendes . Lançamento do CD /Récital Voz-piano
  - Estréias mundiais: Obras de Gilberto Mendes
- 1995
  - 31° Festival Musica Nova Obras
  - Recital de Canto e Piano Obra de Erik Satie para canto e piano (Katrijn Friant) Participaçao especial, José Eduardo Martins Locais
- 1993
  - 29° Festival Musica Nova Recital Ensemble Arcane, Françoise Vanhecke & Katrijn Friant (piano)
  - Workshop: 29° Festival Musica Nova São Paulo, Auditorio do Instituto de Artes / São Paulo
  - Workshop: Centro cultural de Musica Contemporanea CDMC, Unicamp
  - Workshop: ”Masterclass Universitario” Festival Musica Nova Sao-Paul, “La voix dans la musique contemporaine” Concerto com obras de Henrique Oswald, por ocasião do lançamento do Livro “Henrique Oswald – Músico de uma Saga Romantica”, do professor e pianista José Eduardo Martins.
