= University of Michigan Pops Orchestra =

Orchestra in Ann Arbor, Michigan

Michigan Pops Orchestra
- Orchestra
- Founded: 1995; 30 years ago
- Location: Ann Arbor, Michigan
- Website: www.michiganpops.org

The Michigan Pops Orchestra is a pops orchestra made up of students at the University of Michigan at Ann Arbor. Of the several orchestras at the University of Michigan, it is the only one that is entirely student-run and student-directed.

== The Michigan Pops Orchestra history ==
The Michigan Pops Orchestra is the oldest student-run, student-directed collegiate pops orchestra in the United States. It was started in 1995 by University of Michigan student Warren Hsu, and formally established at the university years later.

The shows often include antics and multimedia effects. The orchestra attempts to bring as wide a range of audience members as possible so that regardless of classical background, everyone can enjoy the show. The Michigan Pops Orchestra performs at the historic Michigan Theater and is supported by the University Activities Center (UAC).

== Student run, student directed ==
The orchestra has an open auditions policy and features students from the College of Literature, Science and the Arts, College of Engineering, and the schools of Nursing, Music, and Business.

The Michigan Pops Orchestra has grown significantly. Beginning with just a few board members and a small group of musicians looking to play without the stress, the Michigan Pops Orchestra has blossomed into a full orchestra with a fourteen-member board.

A picture of the full orchestra
