= Jan Van der Roost =

Belgian composer

Jan Van der Roost (born Duffel, 1956) is a Belgian composer.

Van der Roost was educated at the Lemmensinstituut in Leuven, and followed further studies at the Royal Conservatory in Ghent and the Royal Flemish Conservatory in Antwerp. Since 1984 Van der Roost is a professor of counterpoint and fugue at the Lemmensinstituut. He is also a guest professor at the Shobi Institute of Music, the Nagoya University of Arts, and Senzoku Gakuen.

Jan Van der Roost has composed over 90 works, for a variety of musical styles, including brass band, fanfare, concert band, orchestra, and choir. He has also dabbled in composing various pieces in the style of late 17th- to early 18th-century dance music, and is often cited by jazz musician Tom Collier in his lectures as a prime example of musical transformation.

Since 1988, Van der Roost exclusively writes music on commission. He frequently incorporates characteristics of the place he received his commission from into his music. He has also integrated traditional folk music into several of his pieces.

== Works ==
- 1834 (Concert band)
- A Highland Rhapsody (Concert band)
- A Highland Rhapsody (Fanfare)
- A Year Has Four Lives (Children's choir)
- Adagio for Brass (Brass band)
- Adagio for Winds (Concert band)
- Adagio for Winds (Fanfare)
- Albion (Brass band)
- Algona Overture (Concert band)
- Amazonia (Concert band)
- Apollo
- Arghulesques (for Clarinet Quartet)
- Arpád (part 2 from 'Sinfonia Hungarica')
- Arsenal
- Attila! (part 1 from 'Sinfonia Hungarica')
- Autumn
- Avalon
- Balkanya
- Ballad for Bass Trombone
- Bassonnerie
- Beata viscera
- Brasiliana
- By the River
- Cantabile e Ritmico
- Canterbury Chorale
- Canzona gothica (for Trombone)
- Castellum
- Céad Míle Fáilte
- Centennial Prelude
- Ceremonial March
- Chemical Suite (for Trombone quartet)
- Christmas Time
- Concerto Doppio (Per due clarinetti e piano 4 aspetti sonori)
- Concerto Grosso (for Cornet, Trombone and Concert band)
- Concerto per Tromba
- Concierto de Homenaje (for guitar and piano)
- Concordia
- Condacum
- Contemplations
- Contrasto Grosso (For Recorder Quartet and String Quartet)
- Conzensus
- Coventry Carol (From Joy To The World)
- Credentium
- Crescent Moon (Concert Band)
- Cuprioles
- Domus
- Donar
- Dublin Dances
- Dynamica
- Flashing Winds (Concert Band)
- Glorioso
- Images (Rental) (For Alto Saxophone and Orchestra)
- Jupiter
- Manhattan Pictures
- Mercury
- Metalla
- Montana March
- Nobilitas
- Orion
- Osakan Jubilee
- Puszta: Four Gipsy Dances
- Rikudim
- Signature
- Singapura Suite
- Sonatina Piccola (for piccolo and piano) - commissioned by and dedicated to Peter Verhoyen
- Spartacus - Symphonic Tone Poem
- Suite Provencale
- Tirol Terra Fortis
- The Lost Circle
- Volcano

This list is currently incomplete; you can help by going to www.janvanderroost.com/en/work/ and adding more of his compositions in alphabetical order.
