= Edgar Tinel =

Belgian composer and pianist (1854–1912)

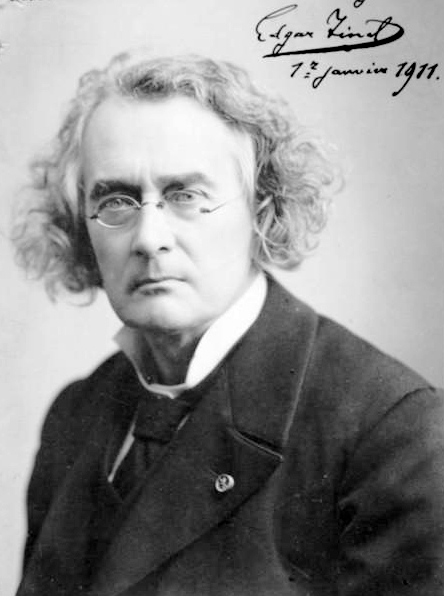
Edgar Tinel in 1911

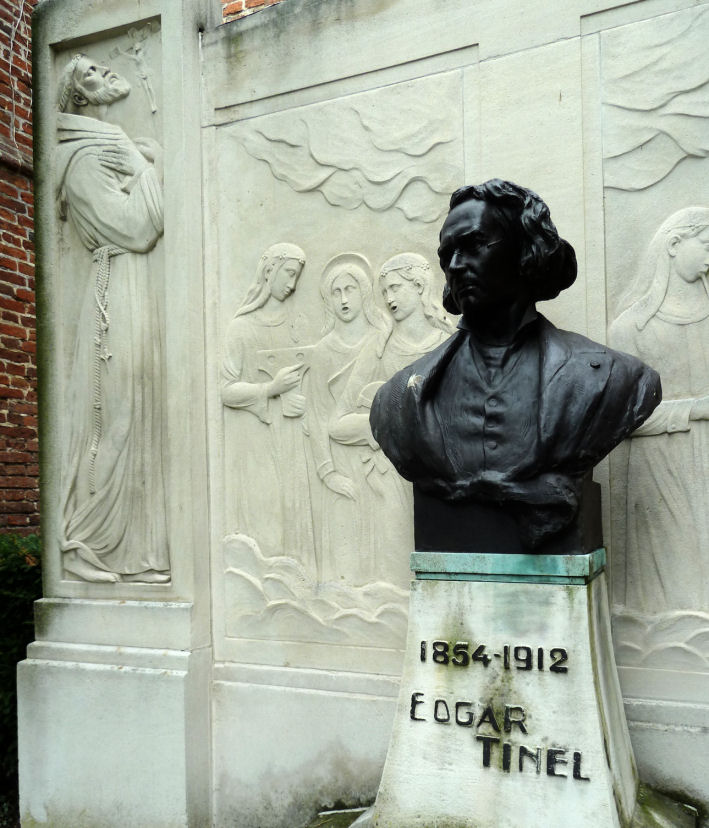
tomb of the Tinel family in Sinaai, by Karel Schuermans

Edgar Pierre Joseph Tinel (27 March 1854 – 28 October 1912) was a Belgian composer and pianist.

He was born in Sinaai, today part of Sint-Niklaas in East Flanders, Belgium, and died in Brussels. After studies at the Brussels Conservatory with Louis Brassin (piano) and François-Auguste Gevaert (composition), he began a career as a virtuoso, but soon abandoned this for composition. In 1877 his cantata Klokke Roeland won him the Belgian Prix de Rome, and in 1881 he succeeded Jacques-Nicolas Lemmens as director of the Mechelen Institute of Religious Music.

He devoted himself to a study of old church music, and his ideas gave rise to Pope Pius X's Motu proprio. Appointed inspector of music education in 1889, he moved to the Brussels Conservatory to become professor of counterpoint and fugue in 1896, and director at the end of 1908. He was made maître de chapelle to the king in 1910, having been elected to the Belgian Royal Academy in 1902.

His liturgical music is polyphonic in the Palestrina style, but this technique conflicted with Tinel's lyrical and mystical temperament, and he had much greater success in his two concert settings of the Te Deum, the oratorio and the religious dramas. These works indicate his total admiration for Bach, but the orchestration, dominated by the strings, is Romantic. Tinel's piano pieces and songs recall Schumann, Mendelssohn and Brahms. He published Le chant gregorien (Mechelen, 1890).

== Work ==
=== Operas ===
- Godelieve, Op. 43
- Katharina, Op. 44

=== Choral ===
- Klokke Roeland, Op. 17, cantata
- Kollebloemen, Op. 20, cantata, 1879, rev. 1889–90
- Vlaamsche stemme, Op. 25, 4 male vv
- Te Deum, Op. 26, 4vv org, 1883
- Psalm vi, Op. 27, 4 male vv 1891
- 4 Adventsliederen, Op. 35, SATB
- Franciscus, Op. 36, oratorio, 1890, libretto by Lodewijk de Koninck
- Aurora, Op. 37, 4 male vv (1885)
- Psalm xxix, Op. 39, 4 male vv
- Missa in honorem BMV de Lourdes, Op. 41, 5 vv 1892
- Cantique nuptial, Op. 45, S/T, org, pf/harp
- Te Deum, Op. 46, 6vv, org, orch, 1905
- Psalm cl, Op. 47, 4 male vv, 1907

=== Keyboard music ===
- Four Nocturnes (voice and piano), Op.1
- Three Fantasy Pieces, Op. 2
- Scherzo in C minor, Op. 3
- Two Pieces, Op.7
- Piano Sonata in F minor, Op. 9
- Au Printemps, Five Fantasy Pieces, Op. 14
- Piano Sonata in G minor, Op. 15
- Organ Sonata in G minor, Op. 29
- Bunte Blätter, six pieces for piano, Op. 32

=== Orchestral music, songs ===
- Principal publishers: Breitkopf & Härtel, Schott (Brussels)
- Kollebloemen (lyrical poem)
- Drie ridders ('Three knights', ballad)
- Incidental music to Pierre Corneille's Polyeucte (1878–1881)

Tinel also wrote a treatise on plain-song.

== Honours ==
- 1900: Officer in the Order of Leopold.

== See also ==
- Joseph Ryelandt
