= Guides Regiment =

Armoured regiment of the Belgian Army

The 1st Guides Regiment (French: 1e Régiment des Guides, Dutch: 1e Regiment Gidsen) was an armoured regiment of the Belgian Army. Previously amalgamated with the 1st Regiment Chasseurs à cheval (2004), in 2011 the regiment was amalgamated with 2/4 Regiment of Chasseurs à cheval to form the "Intelligence, Surveillance, Target Acquisition, Reconnaissance (ISTAR) battalion of the Chasseurs à cheval".

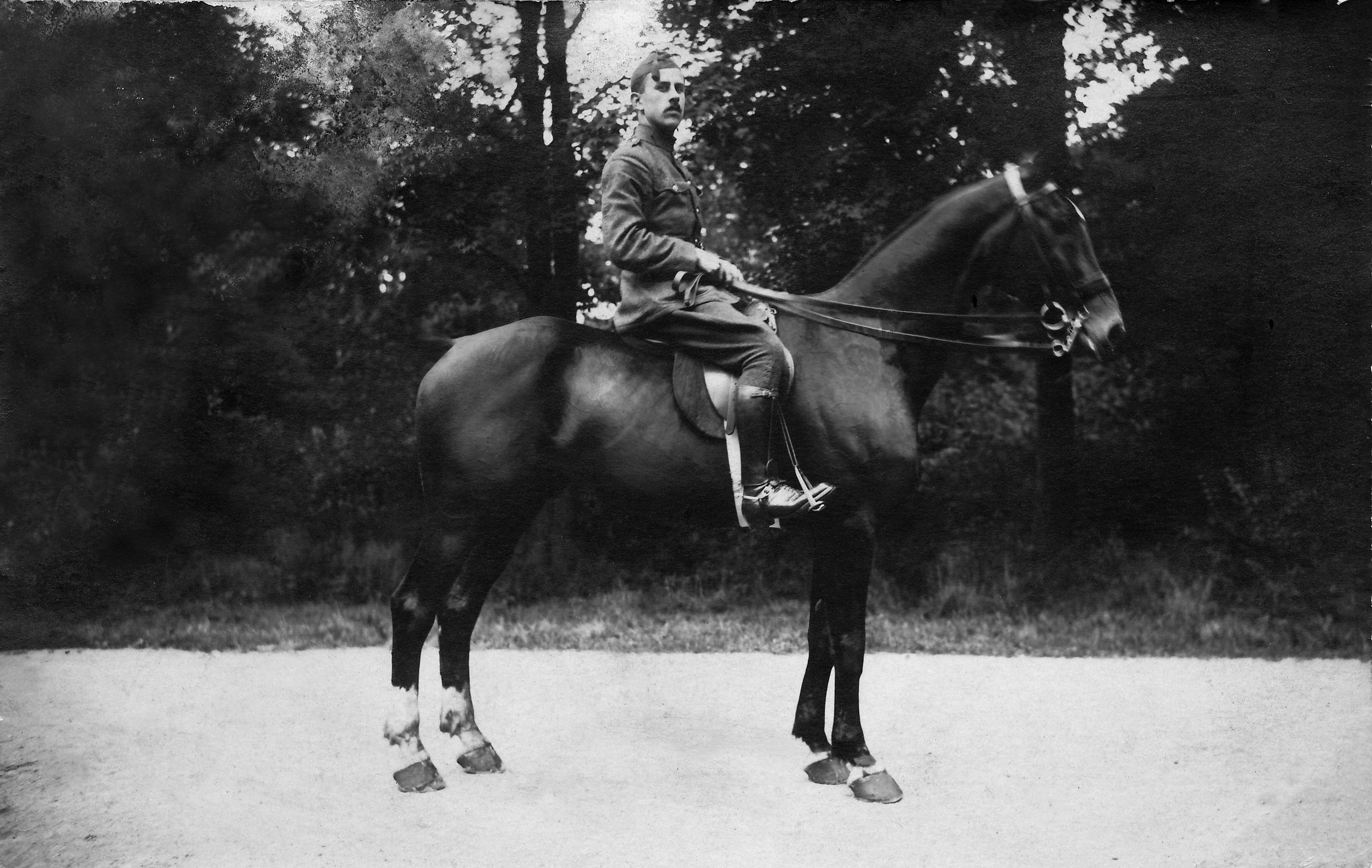
Cavalryman of the 1st Regiment of Guides 1923

== Cavalry regiment ==
The two historic Guides regiments of the Belgian Army were created respectively in January 1833 and July 1875. They formed part of the light cavalry and came to correspond to the Guard cavalry of other nations, providing mounted escorts for the monarchy prior to World War I. Both regiments were mechanized in October 1937, subsequently forming armored battalions in the post-war Belgian Army. The mounted tradition survived until 2011 in the form of a pony retained as the regimental mascot, and always named "Colback".

=== Amalgamations ===
The modern regiment was formed in 1994 by the amalgamation of the (Francophone) 1er Régiment des Guides and the (Dutch-speaking) 2de Regiment Gidsen, following a reorganization of the army. The amalgamation saw both regiments withdrawn as operational units, with the name of the new unit, together with the combined battle honours of its antecedents, assigned to the Cavalry Training School (L’école de cavalerie/Pantsercavalerieschool). In addition to this role, the regiment had a reserve role as an armoured regiment, attached to the 17th Mechanised Brigade, which was Belgium's main force stationed in Germany. This role ended in 2002.

The following year, the regiment was reduced to a single squadron and reactivated as an operational unit. The Eskadron Gidsen was formed as a reconnaissance unit to be attached to the army's Para-Commando Brigade, replacing 3 Regiment Lanciers-Parachutisten. In 2004, the squadron was merged with the 1st Regiment Jagers te Paard, under the combined regimental title of 1ste Regiment Jagers te Paard/Gidsen.

In 2011 the regiment was again amalgamated with 2/4 Regiment to form the "Intelligence, Surveillance, Target Acquisition, Reconnaissance (ISTAR) battalion of the Chasseurs à cheval".

=== Battle honours ===
- Halen/Haelen, Charge of Burkel, Antwerpen/Anvers, Maldegem, Gete/Gette, Winterbeek, Zelzate, Campagne 1914–1918

=== Uniform ===
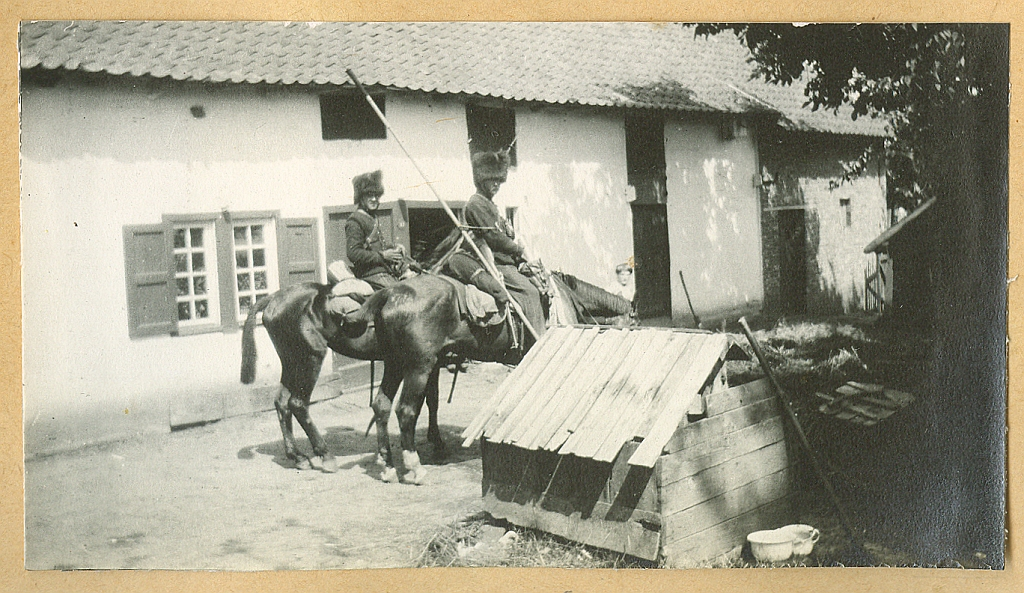
Two soldiers from the Guides cavalry, pictured in August 1914

The two Guides regiments of the Belgian Army wore distinctive uniforms, comprising a plumed busby, green dolman braided in yellow, and crimson breeches, until the early stages of World War I. A modernized green and crimson uniform was introduced for officers' ceremonial dress in the 1930s and is still worn today for the marching and concert attire of the Guides Band.

== Regimental band ==
The Royal Band of the Belgian Guides (Groot Harmonieorkest van de Belgische Gidsen) is an internationally acclaimed premier symphonic band and was formerly the official ceremonial band of the Belgian Guides. The ensemble is composed of 84 musicians, and a trumpet and bugle platoon of 19 players. It still serves as the official military band of the Belgian Land Component, although the regiment of which it formed a part has been disbanded.

By order of King Leopold I of Belgium, the band was formed in 1832 as the Royal Band of the 1st Regiment. The King commissioned Jean-Valentin Bender (nl) (1801–1873) as its first conductor. Under the title of "Musique Particulière du Roi," the band played at numerous royal occasions. During the period between the two World Wars, the Band of the Guides achieved an international reputation.

Directors

- 1832–1873: Jean-Valentin Bender (nl) (1801–1873)
- 1873–1892: Jean-Michel Frédéric Staps (1810–1898)
- 1892–1901: Julien-Jean Simar (1852–1903)
- 1901–1918: Léon Walpot (nl) (1852–1928)
- 1918–1945: Arthur Prévost (nl) (1888–1967)
- 1945–1946: René De Ceuninck (1893–1973)
- 1946–1948: Franz Wangermée (nl) (1894–1967)
- 1948–1957: Simon Poulain (nl) (1906–2004)
- 1957–1961: Karel Torfs (nl) (1912–2002)
- 1962–1985: Yvon Ducène (nl) (born 1928)
- 1985–2003: Norbert Nozy (born 1952)
- 2003–2007: François De Ridder (nl) (1951–2007)
- 2007–2008: Dirk Acquet
- 2008–present: Yves Segers (born 1978)

== Notable people ==
- Wolfgang, the 3rd Duke d'Ursel, Prince of Arche and Charleville, Count of Grobbendonk (1882-1914), died in battle

== Affiliations ==
- United Kingdom - Royal Dragoon Guards
