= Jacques-Nicolas Lemmens =

Belgian organist, music teacher and composer (1823 - 1881)

Jacques-Nicolas (Jaak-Nicolaas) Lemmens (3 January 1823 – 30 January 1881), was a Belgian organist, music teacher, and composer for his instrument.

== Biography ==
Born at Zoerle-Parwijs, near Westerlo, Belgium, Lemmens took lessons from François-Joseph Fétis, who wanted to make him into a musician capable of renewing the organ-player's art in Belgium. Fétis sent him to Adolf Friedrich Hesse in Germany to learn Johann Sebastian Bach's tradition.

In 1847, Lemmens won the Paris Conservatoire's prestigious Prix de Rome with his Le roi Lear ("King Lear"). One year later he published his first work for organ: Dix improvisations dans le style sévère et chantant ("Ten improvisations in a strict and singing style"). In March 1849 he was appointed organ teacher at the Royal Brussels Conservatoire, aged only 26; and he trained numerous young musicians, including two eminent Frenchmen, Alexandre Guilmant and Charles-Marie Widor. See: List of music students by teacher: K to M#Jacques-Nicolas Lemmens.

During 1852 he gave organ recitals in Saint Vincent de Paul, La Madeleine and Saint Eustache churches in Paris, where he stunned audiences with his technique. Particularly notable was his brilliant pedal-playing, which owed a good deal to his studies of Bach's music (at the time Bach's organ works were not at all well known in France). In 1857 he married the English soprano Helen Sherrington (1834–1906), who in the following decade emerged as a leading English concert and operatic singer. He died at Zemst, near Mechelen, Belgium.

== Compositions for organ ==
- Dix Improvisations dans le style sévère et chantant (1848)
- École d'Orgue, basée sur le plain-chant romain (Orgelschule, 1862), incl.:
  - Prélude à 5 (Grave) in E♭ major
  - Prière (Moderato cantabile) in E major
  - Fanfare (Allegro non troppo) in D major
  - Cantabile (Allegretto) in B minor
  - Final (Allegro) in D major
- Four organ pieces in free style : Allegretto in B♭, Christmas-Offertorium, Fantasia in A minor, Grand Fantasia (The Storm) in E minor (1866)
- Trois Sonatas (1874):
  - Sonate Nr. 1 "Pontificale" in D minor
    1. Allegro moderato
    2. Adagio
    3. Marche Pontificale (Maestoso)
    4. Fuga (Fanfare)
  - Sonate Nr. 2 "O Filii" in E minor
    1. Prélude (Allegro non troppo)
    2. Cantabile (Andante)
    3. Fuga (Allegro con fuoco)
  - Sonate Nr. 3 "Pascale" in A minor
    1. Allegro
    2. Adoration (Andante sostenuto)
    3. Finale "Alleluia" (Maestoso recitando - Allegro)

== Lemmensinstituut ==
At the request of the Belgian clerical authorities, Lemmens returned to Belgium to found a school for Church music in Mechelen in 1879. This was to become the future Lemmensinstituut after its move to Leuven in 1968. Lemmens could only work at the development of this school for two years, as he died on 30 January 1881. He was succeeded by Edgar Tinel.
