= Gareth McLearnon =

Northern Irish flautist (born 1980)

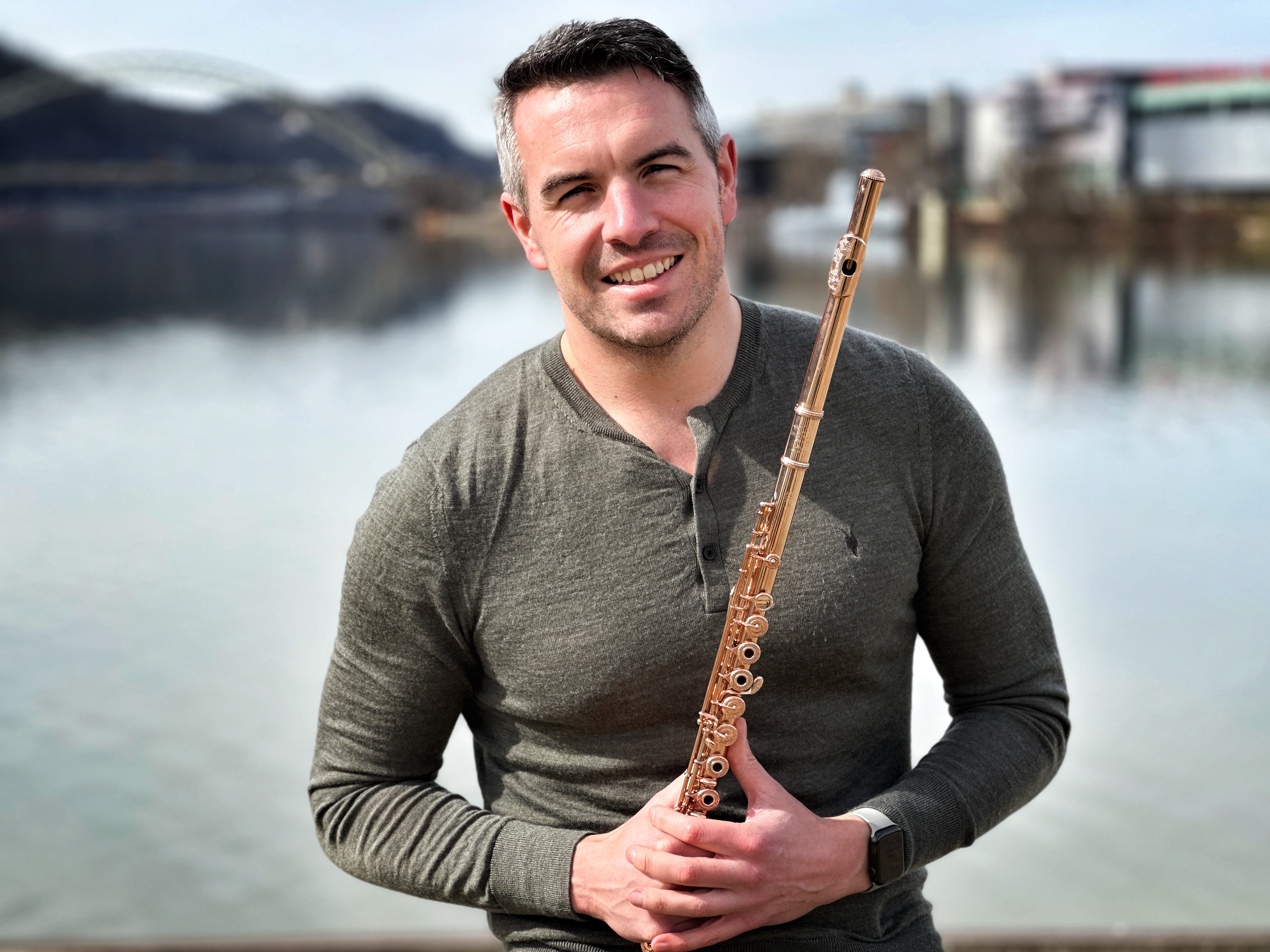

Background information
- Origin: Belfast, Northern Ireland, United Kingdom
- Genres: Classical, Folk
- Occupations: Flautist, Music Arranger, Composer
- Years active: 1996-present
- Website: http://www.garethmclearnon.com/

Gareth McLearnon (born 17 January 1980) is a Northern Irish flautist, composer and arranger based in Strasbourg, France.

== Early life and music education ==
McLearnon began playing the flute aged 11 in his native Belfast, initially studying under William Dunwoody MBE while making his way through the ranks of the 39th Old Boys Flute Band, before going on to study with the Ulster Orchestra’s principal flute Colin Fleming. McLearnon’s first professional orchestral engagement was in 1998, sitting beside his teacher as deputy second flute with the Ulster Orchestra.

McLearnon moved to London in 1999 to attend the Guildhall School of Music and Drama where his principal teachers were Samuel Coles and Ian Clarke. Whilst still a student there McLearnon recorded with the flute-player, Sir James Galway and Harpist Marisa Robles for the charity CD commissioned by John Lubbock Songs for Alexander.

== Awards ==
McLearnon is a recipient of the 2003 Ian Fleming Charitable Trust Music Education Award from the Musicians Benevolent Fund, and a Countess of Munster Musical Trust Award, both of which went towards funding his postgraduate study with Samuel Coles (Principal Flute of The Philharmonia Orchestra) and with Michael Cox (Principal Flute of the BBC Symphony Orchestra).

== Performing ==
Following postgraduate study, McLearnon gained a place for the 2005 season of Southbank Sinfonia – performing around 90 concerts including fully staged opera, World Premieres, solo performances and a solo concerto.

McLearnon has been a freelance performer since 2006 and released his first album Sounds of Home in 2008 with pianist Michael McHale.

McLearnon has been principal flute of The Heritage Orchestra since 2009 - playing concerts all over the UK and Europe including an arena tour with Tim Minchin in 2011 including at the O2 Arena; Antony & The Johnsons shows in London and Paris; Sparks and Ben Folds performances at the Barbican Centre; BBC Proms performances with Jamie Cullum in 2010 and with Pete Tong in 2015, and several shows with Goldie at the Royal Festival Hall in 2014 and 2015.

McLearnon has worked with the Concordia Foundation since 2003. He has been an International Artist Ambassador with Concordia since 2008, performing concerts, including solo concertos, giving masterclasses, coupled with humanitarian work all over the World, including tours to Shanghai, Monaco, Nairobi and Siena.

As a soloist, McLearnon has premiered two flute concertos by James Penny and Owen Bourne – the latter entitled “Dine” being composed especially for him. Other notable concerto performances with orchestra include Mozart’s D major Flute Concerto with the Orchestra of the Shanghai Opera House in the Shanghai Concert Hall in 2011, and several solo performances with Moscow Soloists conducted by Yuri Bashmet: Vivaldi’s Flute Concerto “La Notte” in Yaroslavl in 2014, Donizetti’s Concertino in Khabarovsk in 2018, and several other performances at the Yuri Bashmet Academy in Samara in 2013, 2014, 2016, 2018 & 2019.

Pre-2020, McLearnon was also regularly engaged to deputise in London's West End Theatres and UK and International Tours. He has played in this capacity in a wide variety of shows since 2002 including Miss Saigon, The Lion King (musical), The Wizard of Oz (2011 musical), The Beautiful Game (musical), Wicked (musical), Lord of the Rings (musical), Oliver!, Love Never Dies (musical) and Les Misérables (musical).

As a recording artist McLearnon has recorded both as a soloist, chamber musician and in orchestra in Abbey Road Studios, Air Studios, Angel Recording Studios and numerous others for many TV, Motion Picture & Computer Game soundtracks, as well as for General Release Albums and Library Music; including as a soloist for the award-winning score for the Sony PlayStation game Horizon Zero Dawn, and as guest artist with the world renowned a cappella ensemble Voces8 - recording two tracks for their 2019 Decca Records Album Enchanted Isle.

== Educational Work ==
McLearnon began his educational work in 2005 with the Children’s flute-playing charity Flutewise. He has since given hundreds of masterclasses and flute days around the world including at Yale School of Music, Manhattan School of Music, University of Music and Performing Arts Vienna, Guildhall School of Music and Drama, Norwegian Academy of Music, Royal College of Music, Stockholm, Royal Danish Academy of Music, Academy of Music, University of Zagreb, Gnessin State Musical College and Central Conservatory of Music, Beijing. Since June 2013, he has given dozens of masterclasses and performances across Russia including Samara, Novosibirsk, Yekaterinburg, Kazan, Tolyatti, Perm, Khabarovsk, Voronezh, Kaluga, Vologda, Tyumen and Moscow, as a flute tutor for Yuri Bashmet’s Gifted Young Russians Academies.

== Composing and Arranging ==
McLearnon is an active composer and arranger of music, and came to the attention of his publisher Theodore Presser Company following Sir James Galway playing one of Gareth's arrangements on Live from Lincoln Center on US Network TV in December 2004. Theodore Presser subsequently decided to publish a collection of his Irish Flute and Piano arrangements entitled "Round Ireland with a Flute" which was released in August 2008 at the Kansas City NFA Convention.

McLearnon has also written widely for Flute choir and his notable original compositions include:

- The Flutewise Theme for Graded Flute Ensemble (2010)
- Fabulously Fugal, Fantasically Fleeting, Favourably Fruitful Fluting Fanfare for Massed Flute Ensemble (2013)
- Single Yellow Line for Graded Flute Ensemble (2013)
- Lamasery Jigsaw for Flute Ensemble (2015)
- Cosmic Dawn for Flute Ensemble (2017)
- Edge Effect for Flute Ensemble (2019)
- DEEP DISH for Flute Ensemble (2022)
- Steel City for Flute Ensemble (2023)
- Three Sheets to the Wind for Flute Quartet (2023)
- AFFanfare for Flute Ensemble (2023)
- Fondant Forward for Low Flute Ensemble (2024)
- A Peace of the Acton for Flute Ensemble (2024)
- Adams Funk Fanfare for Low Flute Ensemble (2024)
- HOT METZ for Junior Flute Ensemble (2025)
- Pick Pic Picc for Piccolo Trio (2025)
- Aurora for Flute Ensemble (2025)
- Fourmies-Dabble for Junior Flute Ensemble (2025)
- Roots for Flute & Piano (2025)

== Work within the Flute Industry ==
McLearnon began his involvement with the flute industry in 1999 while still a student at the Guildhall, when he began working part-time at the specialist flute shop Top Wind, in London. In October 2005, following the end of the Southbank Sinfonia concert season, he took up a position as Flute Specialist & Pearl Flutes Artist for the Japanese company Pearl Flutes in Europe – a position which he held until August 2014. After leaving the position at Pearl, McLearnon accepted a similar role as European Artist-in-Residence for the Wm. S. Haynes Co. of Boston, Massachusetts. McLearnon is a Haynes Artist, and plays on a custom made 14K Gold Haynes Flute.
