= Reno Pops Orchestra =

Reno Pops Orchestra is an all volunteer community orchestra founded in 1982, based in Reno, Nevada. The orchestra is composed of over 65 musicians ranging in age from 11 to 90, including professional musicians, semi-professional musicians, as well as working and retired individuals and students.

The Orchestra is supported by Annual Memberships, grants and generous private donations. The Orchestra performs five to seven free concerts per year, bringing classical and pops music to communities in Northern Nevada and Northeastern California.
