= Robert Groslot =

Belgian pianist, conductor and composer

Robert Groslot (born 9 June 1951) is a Belgian pianist, conductor and composer.

== Biography ==
=== Pianist ===
Robert Groslot studied the piano at the Royal Conservatory Antwerp. In 1974, he won the Alessandro Casagrande piano competition in Terni, Italy. In 1978, he won the 6th prize at the Queen Elisabeth Competition for piano. He undertook concert trips across 4 continents through more than 20 countries and made many studio, radio and television recordings, over 120 CDs.

Until 2009, Robert Groslot has taught piano at the Lemmensinstituut in Leuven, at the Royal Conservatoire Antwerp and at the Utrechts Conservatorium. From 1996 to 2001, he served as the artistic director of the Royal Conservatoire Antwerp.

=== Conductor ===
A few years after winning the 6th prize in the Queen Elisabeth Competition, Groslot also turns to conducting. In 1991, he founded the symphonic orchestra Il Novecento. With this orchestra, he performs, from 1991, during the Night of the Proms. In the mid 1990's he also founded two Belgian youth orchestras that served as a training ground for an entire generation of musicians, many of whom can be found working professionally throughout Europe.

=== Composer ===
Since 2009, Groslot focusses on composing, alongside conducting Il Novecento. Recurring sources of inspiration include English literature (William Butler Yeats, James Joyce, T.S. Eliot), nature, and the seasons.

== Compositions ==
=== Orchestral works ===
- 2014: Perceptions & Games – A Chamber Symphony
- 2006: Si le Monde...
- 2002: L'Odissea d'Orfeo
- 1995: The Great Globe
- 1991: Black Venus
- 1980: Eyes
- 1979: Rainfall on Pink City

=== Concerti ===
- 2013: Concerto for Organ and Orchestra – The Orbit of Chiron
- 2013: Concerto for Double Bass and Orchestra
- 2012: Concerto for English Horn and Orchestra
- 2012: Concerto for Trumpet and Orchestra
- 2012: Suite for Oboe, with string orchestra and harp
- 2011: Concerto for Cello and Orchestra
- 2012: Concerto for Marimba, Vibes and Orchestra
- 2012: Concerto for Viola and Orchestra
- 2011: Concerto for Harp and Orchestra
- 2011: Concerto for Guitar and Orchestra
- 2011: Concerto for Trombone and Orchestra
- 2011: Concerto for Piccolo and Orchestra
- 2011: Tre Notturni for solo horn, with string orchestra and harp
- 2011: Concerto for Cello and Orchestra
- 2010: Concerto for Piano and Orchestra
- 2010: Concerto for Violin and Orchestra
- 2009: Concerto for Flute and Orchestra
- 1985: Achaé, la docile Amie, for clarinet and symphonic orchestra

=== Choral works ===
- 2011: Six Poems by William Butler Yeats, for choir and ensemble

=== Chamber music ===
- 2014: Poème Secret, for solo harp, flute, clarinet, and string quartet
- 2014: Matrix in Persian Blue, for string quartet
- 2014: Reflections on the Waste Land
- 2013: Hoquetus, Battaglia and Madrigal, for clarinet and harp
- 2013: Wagner's Moon, for clarinet and piano
- 2013: Parfums Ephémères, for clarinet, viola, and piano
- 2013: Painted Curves – Reflections upon four contemporary paintings, for clarinet and string quartet
- 2013: Labyrinth, for oboe and percussion
- 2013: Three Night Pieces, for flute and harp
- 1991: The Graveyard between Art and Knowledge for tuba and piano
- 1986: De Tunnel for clarinet quartet
- 1979: Paganini Rides Again for two pianos

=== Piano solo ===
- 2013: Linee Incantevoli
- 2013: Three Time Sketches
- 2010: Il Silenzio svelato
- 1993: I Colli senesi
- 1985: Morgenrood en nachtblauw
- 1981: Foto met eenzame Boot
- 1979: A Dream for the King of Persia

=== Arrangements ===
- 1998/2007: Hindemith, Paul – Flute Sonata: arranged for flute and orchestra

== Discography ==
- 2024: Concerti – Roeland Hendrikx, Jan Michiels, Brussels Philharmonic, Il Novecento (Antarctica Records – AR 057)
- 2023: Now, Voyager, sail... – Linus Roth, Brussels Philharmonic (Antarctica Records – AR 046)
- 2022: I Will Come Back – Flemish Radio Choir (Antarctica Records – AR 039)
- 2022: Concerto for Bass Guitar and Orchestra – Thomas Fiorini, Brussels Philharmonic (Antarctica Records – AR 035)
- 2021: The Intimacy Of Distance – Charlotte Wajnberg, Brussels Philharmonic (NAXOS – 8.579100)
- 2019: Concertos For Piano, Cello And Harp – Jan Michiels, Ilia Yourivitch Laporev, Eline Groslot, Brussels Philharmonic (NAXOS – 8.579057)
- 2018: Hidden Facts: Flemish Music For Woodwinds & Piano – compilation (Etcetera – KTC 1624)
- 2018: Concerto For Orchestra; Violin Concerto – Joanna Kurkowicz, Brussels Philharmonic (NAXOS – 8.573808)
- 2018: Chamber Music (TYXart – TXA18113)
- 2017: Works For Cello And Piano - Ilia Yourivich Laporev, Ilia Laporev Jr., Dasha Moroz (TYXart – TYXA17094)
- 2014: Works for Flute and Piccolo – Peter Verhoyen, Arco Baleno Ensemble, Eline Groslot, Stefan De Schepper, Heigo Rosin, Benjamin Dieltjens (Groslot Music – GM 1401)
