= Minneapolis Pops Orchestra =

The Minneapolis Pops Orchestra is a pops orchestra providing live public performances by 45 professional musicians free of charge at various venues in the Twin Cities. It was founded in 1949. Most Pops Orchestra musicians perform with the Minnesota Opera Orchestra, Minnesota Orchestra, The Saint Paul Chamber Orchestra, and other distinguished Twin Cities musical groups during the winter months. The orchestra plays most often at the Lake Harriet bandshell in the Linden Hills neighborhood of Southwest Minneapolis. Each year, concerts feature guest artists as well as student musicians from area high schools.

The regular season runs during the month of July, presenting concerts most weekend evenings.

NORP

In 2009, the orchestra began its "New Orchestral Repertoire Project" to seek out new pieces to add to its repertoire. The contest carries a $1000 cash prize and a performance at one of that year's concerts.
