= Harvard Pops Orchestra =

Orchestra in Harvard University, Massachusetts

The Harvard Pops Orchestra
- Orchestra
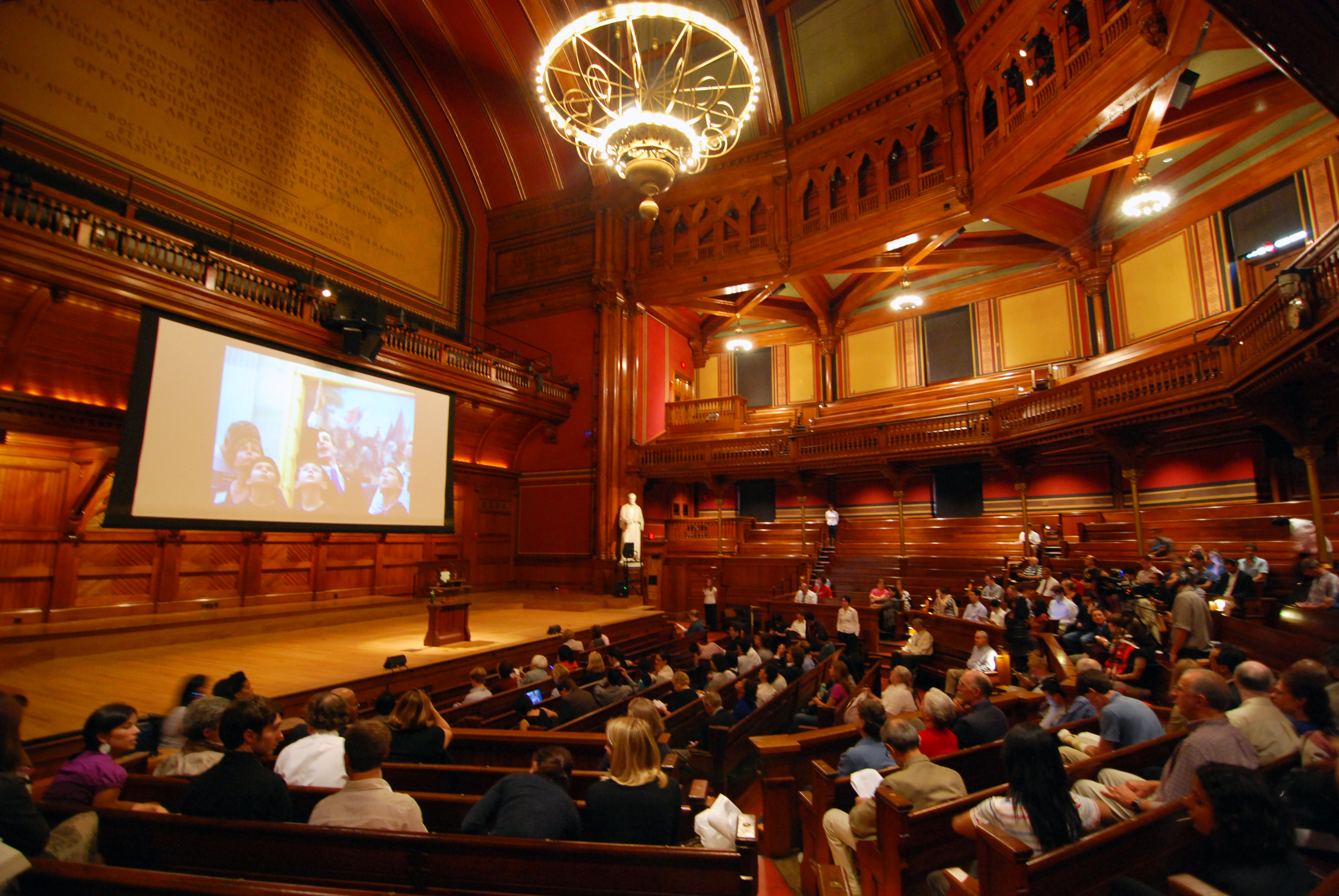
- Sanders Theatre
- Founded: 1996
- Concert hall: Lowell Lecture Hall and Sanders Theatre
- Website: www.harvardpops.com

The Harvard Pops Orchestra is a collegiate orchestra composed of Harvard students and based in Cambridge, Massachusetts. The orchestra has about 70 members and specializes in playing a variety of classical repertoire, standard pops works, and arrangements and original compositions written by students. The Pops is known for its unconventional and creative programs which feature student-written scripts, original films, and a strong emphasis on new music by undergraduate composers. Each of its concerts is built around a creative theme (like cartoons, murder mysteries, and pirates) and employs theatrical and visual elements. The Pops Orchestra shows include singers and actors from the Hasty Pudding and a silent film that accompanies the orchestra.

== History ==
Founded with the Office of the Dean of Students at Harvard College in January 1996, the orchestra is the nation's second oldest collegiate pops orchestra. Its official debut took place in April 1996. The orchestra was founded by Eric Damast '97, and was entirely student-run at its inception. In 1998, the orchestra hired music director Allen Feinstein '86, who continues to lead the Pops to this day.
