= Frederik Neyrinck =

- Born: Frederik Neyrinck; August 14, 1985 (age 41); Kortrijk, Belgium
- Genre: Classical
- Occupations: Composer, Pianist
- Instrument: Piano
- Website: http://www.frederikneyrinck.be/

Frederik Neyrinck (Kortrijk, 14 augustus 1985) is a Belgian composer and pianist.

He studied in Brussels, Stuttgart and Graz, with Piet Kuijken (piano), Jan Van Landeghem, Marco Stroppa and Clemens Gadenstätter (composition).

His compositional style is characterized by a principle he terms evolutionary repetition, a technique where musical motifs progressively transform over time. This approach is prominently featured in his early cycle Processus and is applied across various musical parameters, including timbre and instrumentation.

Neyrinck is a founding member and the resident composer of the Odysseia Ensemble. Between 2020 and 2024, he served as an Artist in Residence at I Solisti. He has collaborated with numerous international groups, including the Brussels Philharmonic, Klangforum Wien, and the Bozzini Quartet. In 2017-2018, he was season's composer at Concertgebouw Brugge.

His work spans various genres, including opera and music theater. Notable projects include Plan Libre, which incorporates conceptual ideas from architect Le Corbusier.

In addition to composing, Neyrinck performs as a pianist, most notably in a duo with Teresa Doblinger.

== Recognition ==
- International Composition Competition Melbourne (2010)
- MA – Stephan De Jonghe Composition Competition (2011)
- Austrian Staatsstipendium for composition (2018)
- Förderpreis der stadt Wien (2020)

== Discography (selection) ==
- Colori della Primavera – includes Frederik Neyrinck's Sonatine – Klangstudie 26 for piccolo and electric and acoustic guitar, preformed by Peter Verhoyen (piccolo) and Nico Couck (acoustic and electric guitar). Etcetera Records KTC 1882 (2026)
- The Flemish Connection. Frederik Neyrinck vol. 1. I SOLISTI. Passacaille Records PAS 1102 (2021)
- The Flemish Connection. Frederik Neyrinck vol. 2. I SOLISTI. Passacaille Records PAS 1106 (2021)

== Bibliography ==
- ROQUET, F., Lexicon Vlaamse Componisten, Roularta Books, 2007
