= Etcetera Records =

Dutch/Belgian classical music record label

Etcetera Records is a Dutch/Belgian classical music record label founded in Amsterdam in 1982. The original founders were David Rossiter and Michel Arcizet. In 2002 Coda Distribution bought the label with the late Paul Janse (1967-2014) and Dirk De Greef as A&R managers, later joined by Roman Jans. Currently the label is based in Lummen, Belgium.

== Selected artists ==
- Roberta Alexander
- Dirk Brossé
- Egidius Kwartet
- Ignace Michiels
- Éliane Reyes
- Peter Verhoyen
- Roger Woodward
