= Brass Band Buizingen =

Brass Band Buizingen are based in the town of Halle outside of Brussels in Belgium and was founded in 1975.

Brass Band Buizingen became a traditional brass band after the switch from fanfare band. In 1997 their achievements were recognised with their nomination as Cultural Ambassador of Flanders. Under the baton of their conductor and Artistic Director Luc Vertommen they are currently (2009) Belgian National Champions, Flemish Open Champions as well as Dutch Open Champions (Eurobrass), they also came third in 2009 at the World Music Contest in Kerkrade (the Netherlands). This year (2010) they will compete in the European Brass Band Championships in Linz, Austria. The band have also recorded a number of CDs featuring Belgian composers of the past century including Paul Gilson, Marcel Poot and August de Boeck.
