= Royal Band of the Belgian Guides =

Military band in the Belgian Army

- Koninklijke Muziekkapel van de Gidsen (KMG); Musique Royale des Guides (MRG)
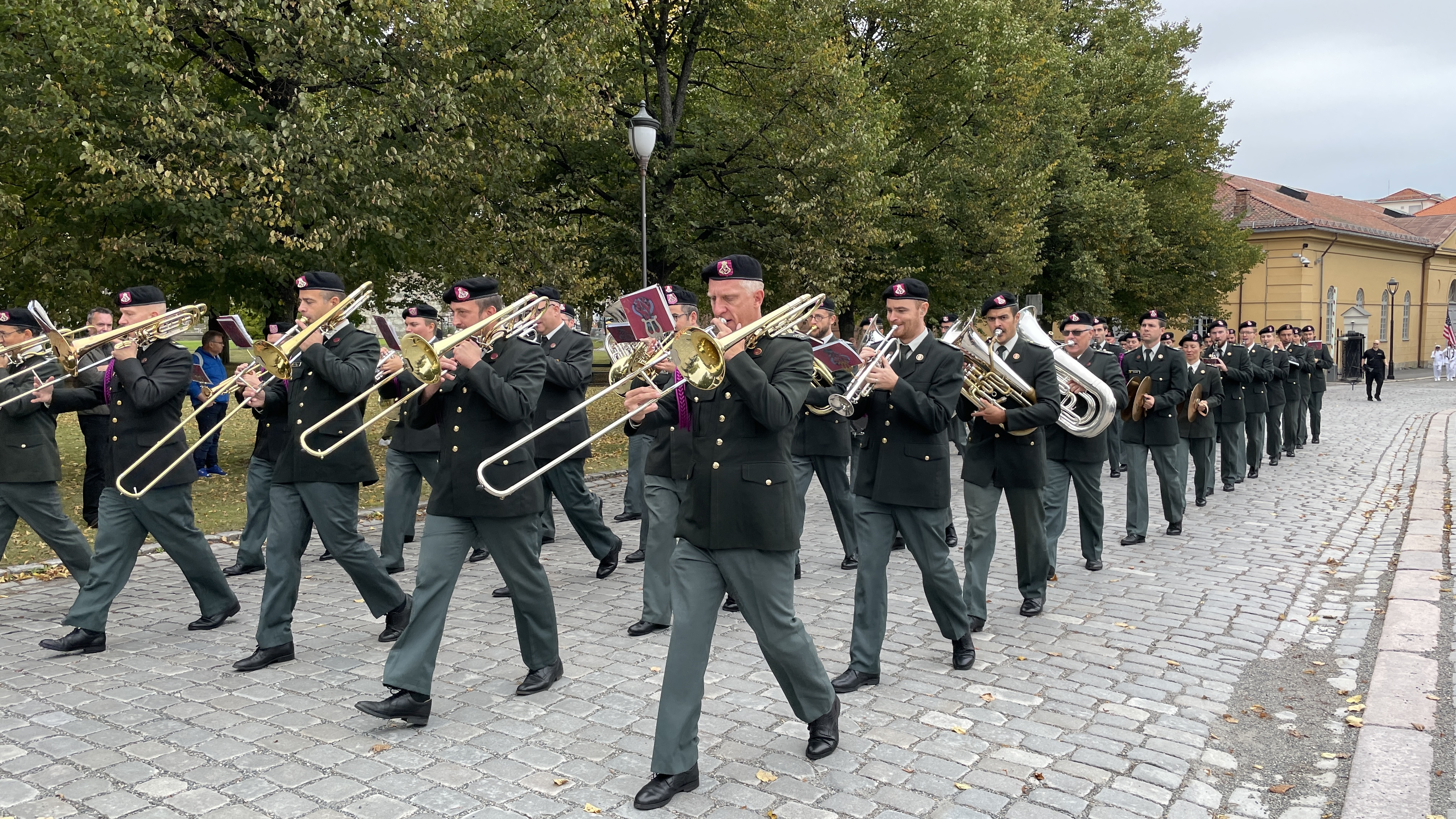
- The Royal Band of the Belgian Guides performing in Oslo, September 2022
- Active: 16 August 1832 – Present
- Country: Belgium
- Allegiance: Philippe of Belgium
- Branch: Belgian Land Component
- Type: Military band
- Part of: Guides Regiment (2004 – 2011)
- HQ: Brussels
- Website: www.amrg-vkmg.be/the-band

Commanders
- Bandmaster: Commandant Yves Segers
- Adjutant-Major: Hans Demeurisse
- Trumpet-Major: Olivier Brichau
- Notable commanders: Jean-Valentin Bender; Simon Poulain; François De Ridder

The Royal Band of the Belgian Guides (Dutch: Groot Harmonieorkest van de Belgische Gidsen, French: Musique Royale des Guides) is the premier musical component of the Belgian Army (Land Component). It is the largest and oldest of the three professional military bands of the Belgian Armed Forces. It formerly served as the regimental band of the Guides Regiment from 2004 to 2011. The combined ensemble is composed of over 100 musicians, including a 19-member bugle platoon.

== Overview ==
The band originated in August 1832, by order of King Leopold I of Belgium, as the Royal Band of the 1st Guides Regiment. The King commissioned Jean-Valentin Bender as band master. The formation accompanied the royal couple to formal events. As a result, it gained the title of Musique Particulière du Roi (Private Music Band of the King). The success of the band was immediate and it was soon regarded as one of the best music formations in Europe. In the 20 year period between the two World Wars, the band gained an international reputation, as well as a domestic notability that it has never experienced before. Under the baton of Arthur Prévost, it conducted an official tour of the United States in 1929, being received by President Herbert Hoover in the White House. The 18 Days' Campaign severely damaged the band's structure, with most band members being sent into exile in the United Kingdom. On 4 September 1944, the band was honored by the Belgian people in a special performance, following the country's liberation by allied forces. In early 1957, Simon Poulain went into retirement and on 11 February 1957, the Minister of National Defense appointed Lieutenant Karel Torfs to succeed him. By 1962, the band had conducted over 1,000 concerts in Belgium, and by 1985, had successfully participated in a number of major international festivals. On 16 June 2007 François De Ridder, who had been the bandmaster for only 4 years, was killed in Zellik while carrying out an assignment as an volunteer firefighter in the city.

All band members have received a first prize at one of the country's Royal Conservatories, with some of them being teachers at such institutions. Furthermore, all members of the band are trained Belgian infantrymen.

== List of directors ==
The post of commander of the band is also concurrent to the post of the Inspector General of the Belgian Armed Forces Bands.

- 1832–1873: Jean-Valentin Bender (nl) (1801–1873)
- 1873–1892: Jean-Michel Frédéric Staps (1810–1898)
- 1892–1901: Julien-Jean Simar (1852–1903)
- 1901–1918: Léon Walpot (nl) (1852–1928)
- 1918–1945: Arthur Prévost (nl) (1888–1967)
- 1945–1946: René De Ceuninck (1893–1973)
- 1946–1948: Franz Wangermée (nl) (1894–1967)
- 1948–1957: Simon Poulain (nl) (1906–2004)
- 1957–1961: Karel Torfs (nl) (1912–2002)
- 1962–1985: Yvon Ducène (nl) (born 1928)
- 1985–2003: Norbert Nozy (born 1952)
- 2003–2007: François De Ridder (nl) (1951–2007)
- 2007–2008: Dirk Acquet
- 2008–present: Yves Segers (nl) (born 1978)

––––––––––––––––––––

(interlanguage link ISO 639-1 code: nl = Dutch, Flemish)
