= Peter Verhoyen =

Belgian flautist and piccolo player

- Born: Peter Verhoyen; Belgium
- Genre: Classical
- Occupations: Orchestral, soloist
- Instruments: Flute, piccolo
- Member of: Antwerp Symphony Orchestra
- Formerly of: Arco Baleno
- Website: http://www.peterverhoyen.be

Peter Verhoyen is a flautist and piccolo player.

== Biography ==
Peter Verhoyen is principal piccolo of the Antwerp Symphony Orchestra, co-founder of the chamber music ensemble Arco Baleno, professor of piccolo at the Royal Conservatoire Antwerp, senior lecturer piccolo at the Universität für Musik und darstellende Kunst Graz, and organizer of the International Flute Seminar Bruges.

Piccolo specialist, Verhoyen has commissioned, inspired and premiered a large number of new works for his instrument, notably including 4 piccolo concerti by Levente Gyöngyösi, Robert Groslot, Erik Desimpelaere and Bart Watté. He also realised a of a series of recordings in which the piccolo is the central instrument. At the Royal Conservatoire Antwerp, Peter Verhoyen developed the first European piccolo Masters program.

Peter Verhoyen has worked with a large number of other performers and orchestras, including Collegium Instrumentale Brugense (conducted by Patrick Peire) and the orchestra Il Novecento (conducted by Robert Groslot).

For his dedication to contemporary Flemish music, Peter has been awarded the Fuga Trofee from the Union of Belgian composers in 2017.

In 2025, Peter Verhoyen was appointed as a member of the Koninklijke Vlaamse Academie van België voor Wetenschappen en Kunsten (Royal Flemish Academy of Belgium for Science and the Arts).

== Bibliography ==
- Lexicon van de Muziek in West-Vlaanderen, part 4 (Brugge, 2003), ISBN 90-72390-26-1 (in Dutch)

=== as author ===
- Verhoyen, Peter; Lauwers, Anke; Miller, Sarah (2022). Peter's Piccolo World. A Piccolo Inspiration Book for Intermediate to Advanced Players. Vol. 1. Illustrated by Ann-Sofie Verhoyen.
- Verhoyen, Peter; Lauwers, Anke; Miller, Sarah (2024). Peter's Piccolo World. A Piccolo Inspiration Book for Intermediate to Advanced Players. Vol. 2. Illustrated by Ann-Sofie Verhoyen.
- Verhoyen, Peter; Lauwers, Anke; Miller, Sarah; Mondéjar Amat, Ana (2025). Peter's Piccolo World. Exercise book. Illustrated by Ann-Sofie Verhoyen. Piano accompaniment by Stefan De Schepper.

== Discography (selection) ==
- Colori della Primavera. Music by Robert Groslot, Frederik Neyrinck, Erik Desimpelaere, Jan Huylebroeck, Rudi Tas and Maarten De Splenter. Peter Verhoyen (piccolo) with Peter Maertens (tenor horn), Nico Couck (acoustic and electric guitar), Ann-Sofie Verhoyen (harp) and Stefan De Schepper (piano). EtCetera KTC 1882 (2026)
- Patchwork. With Stefan De Schepper (piano), Nele Tiebout (saxophone), Benoît Viratelle (bass clarinet), Pieterjan Vranckx (seven African drums) and Sylvie Erauw (marimba). EtCetera KTC 1794 (2023)
- Piccolo concerti. With Ataneres ensemble. EtCetera KTC 1749 (2022)
- Piccolo sonatas. With Stefan De Schepper, piano. EtCetera KTC 1736 (2021)
- Zigeunerweisen. With Ilonka Kolthof, Anke Lauwers, Thomas Fabry (piccolo), Stefan de Schepper (piano) and Ann-Sofie Verhoyen (harp). Etcetera KTC 1701 (2020)
- Mighty Metamorphoses. 21st-century repertoire for piccolo and flute. With Stefan De Schepper (piano), and Aldo Baerten (flute). EtCetera KTC 1668 (2019)
- Hidden Facts. Flemish Music For Woodwinds & Piano. With Focus Wind Quintet and Stefan De Schepper (piano). EtCetera KTC 1624 (2018)
- La Gazza Ladra. With Stefan De Schepper, piano. EtCetera KTC 1570 (2017)
- W.A.Mozart Flute Quartets. With Arco Baleno Chamber Music Group. Codaex CX 4010 (2015)
- Best of both worlds. Marc Matthys European Quartet with Ali Ryerson and Peter Verhoyen. Alley Cats PMP 5411499510225 (2014)
- Robert Groslot - Works for Flute and Piccolo. With Arco Baleno Ensemble, Eline Groslot, Stefan De Schepper, Heigo Rosin, Benjamin Dieltjens. Groslot-Music Records GM 1401 (2014)
- Robert Groslot conducts his concertos. With the Royal Symphonic Band of the Belgian Guides; Robert Groslot, conductor; Steven Mead, Euphonium Soloist; Norbert Nozy, Saxophone Soloist; Peter Verhoyen, Piccolo Soloist; Carlo Willems, Marimba Soloist; Vlad Weverbergh, Clarinet Soloist. Groslot-Music Records GM 1301 (2013)
- Arco Baleno (conducted by the composer), Peter Verhoyen, Diane Verdoodt – play works by Robert Groslot. Codaex CX 4027 (2010)
- The Birds. Original works for piccolo and piano. With Stefan De Schepper (piano). Codaex CX 4026 (2009); reissued as EtCetera KTC 7085 (2025)
- Dirk Brossé - Earth tones. Chamber music for ensemble Arco Baleno and ethnic instruments. Codaex CX4025 (2009)
- Britannia. British chamber music for flute/piccolo, strings and harpsichord. With Arco Baleno Chamber Music Group. EtCetera KTC 1372 (2008)
- Piccolo Tunes. With Stefan De Schepper, piano. EtCetera KTC 1296 (2006)
- Debussy/Brewaeys – Preludes for symphony orchestra. With Royal Flemish Philharmonic. Talent DOM 381004 (2005)
- Antonio Vivaldi. String concertos – Flute concerto 'Il Gardellino' – Piccolo concerti. With Arco Baleno Chamber Music Group. EtCetera KTC 1278 (2004)
- Identities. 20th century chamber music for flute and string quartet. With Arco Baleno Chamber music group. René Gailly CD87 169 (2000)
- Conversations. With Arco Baleno Chamber Music Group. PKP 014 (1999)
- Fantasia … sul linguaggio perduto: compositions for flute and string trio. With Arco Baleno Chamber Music Group. Radio 3 R397003 (1996)
