= Lemmensinstituut =

Music conservatory in Mechelen, Belgium

Coordinates: 50.8819°N 4.68139°E

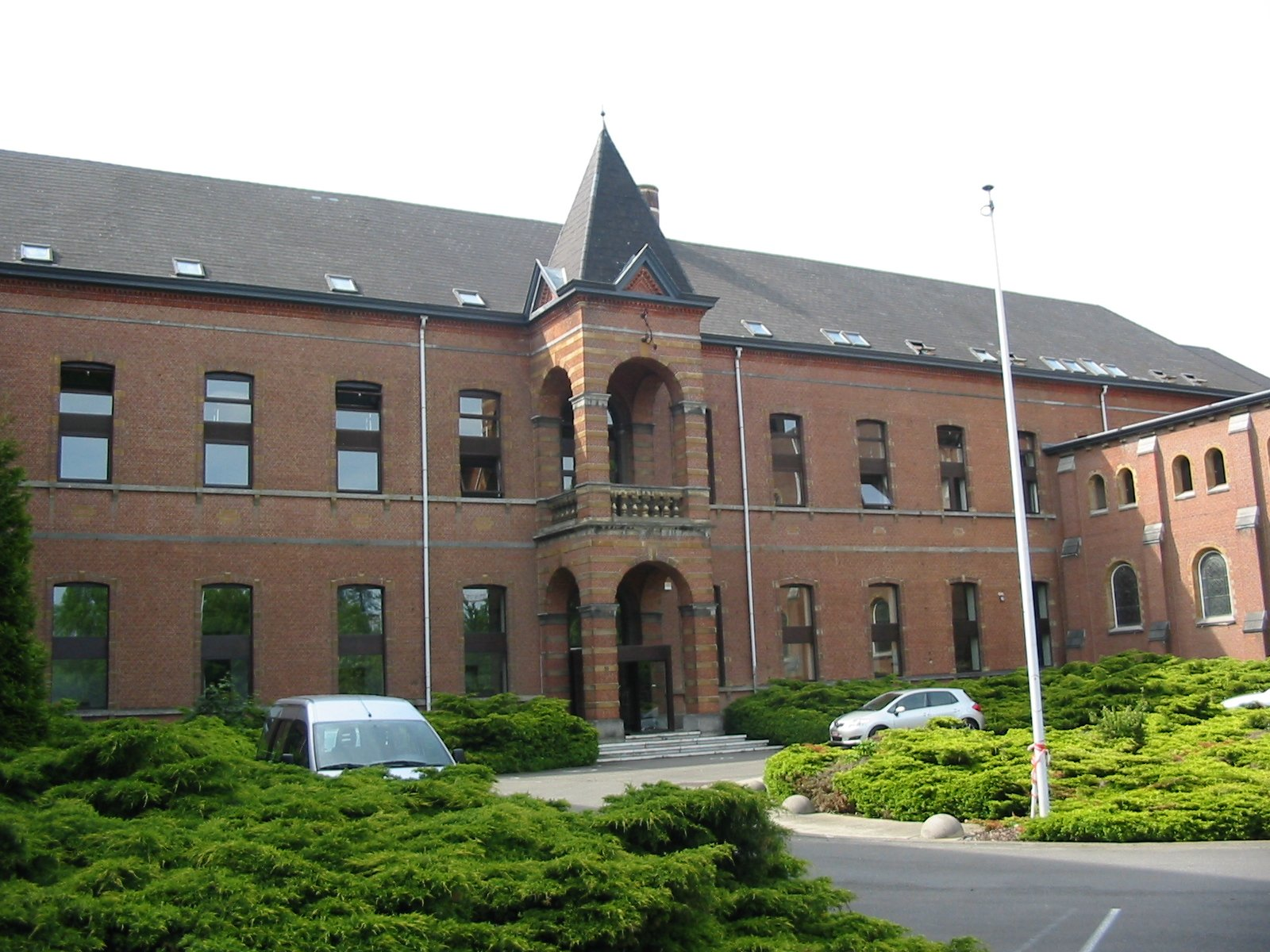
The Lemmensinstituut

The Lemmensinstituut (Lemmens Institute) is a Belgian conservatory of music. It was founded in Mechelen, in 1879, by the Belgian bishops as the École de musique religieuse (School of Religious Music). It was later renamed after its first director, Jacques-Nicolas Lemmens.

Although its programs were greatly expanded over the years, it remained in essence a school of religious music until the 1960s and 1970s, when major changes occurred. It moved to Leuven in 1968, and its programs were aligned on those of Belgium's conservatories of music, such that in 1971 its "laureate" diploma was considered legally equivalent to a "First Prize" of a conservatory. It also added a teacher's training course (a "Music Pedagogy" course of study), and a high school specializing in music.

Nowadays the Lemmensinstituut has a reputation for offering one of Europe's finest Music Therapy degree programs. The institute's Music Pedagogy course of study is also well known in Europe and in its history the Lemmens Institute has trained many famous composers including Jan van der Roost and Piet Swerts. In addition to the Music Education degree programs, the institute also offers a teaching degree in Drama.

The Music Department has been led by the following directors:

- 1879–1881: Jacques-Nicolas Lemmens
- 1881–1909: Edgar Tinel
- 1909–1917: Aloys Desmet
- 1918–1952: Jules Van Nuffel
- 1953–1962: Jules Vyverman
- 1962–1988: Jozef Joris
- 1988–2005: Paul Schollaert
- since 2005: Marc Erkens
