= Elie Apper =

Belgian musician (born 1933)

Elie Apper (born 1933) is a Belgian classical saxophonist who is well known as a former member of the Saxophone Quartet of Belgium ("Le Quatuor Belge de Saxophones"). The quartet was founded in 1953 and made its American debut on December 9, 1970, in Fort Worth with the Youth Orchestra of Greater Fort Worth. The Quartet was founded by Francois Daneels, who was a professor of saxophone at the Brussels Conservatory.

== Career ==
From 1972 to 1974, Apper served as visiting lecturer at the University of North Texas College of Music. He also was once a faculty member of the Flemish Conservatory and a soloist with the Flemish Radio and Television Orchestra and the Royal Band of the Belgian Guides.

== Saxophone Quartet members in 1970 ==
- François Daneels (1921–2010), soprano saxophone
- Alfred Jacquet, alto saxophone
- Elie Apper, tenor saxophone
- Jean Cunche, baritone saxophone

== Higher education ==
Apper, a student of Francois Daneels at the Royal Conservatory of Brussels, gained First Prize and was appointed Professor of Saxophone (Flemish section).

== Selected discography ==
- Saxo-Rama, featuring Elie Apper, alto sax, Zéphyr Records Z-08 (LP) (1980); LCCN 88-752035; OCLC 18992280

Recorded at Studio Steurbaut, Ghent, Belgium (Gilbert Steurbaut)
Produced by Schott frères
Side A

1. Concerto N° 1 for Alto Saxophone (1902), by Paul Gilson (1865–1942), Elie Apper; Royal Guides Band, Yvon Ducène, conductor
2. Divertimento N° 12 for 2 Saxophones, by Paul Arma (1905–1987), Elie Apper and Norbert Nozy, saxophonists

Side B

1. Suite for Saxophone Quartet, by Jacques Leduc (born 1932), Saxofonia Ensemble
2. Parades II For Saxophone Sextet, (1978), by Victor Legley (1915–1994), Saxofonia Ensemble

Sextet: Norbert Nozy (soprano saxophone), Elie Apper (alto saxophone), Rita Van der Meirsch (alto saxophone), Freddy Couché (tenor saxophone), Jozef Lauwers (tenor saxophone), Frank Commeene (baritone saxophone)

- Saxophonia, Europ Records (1977), OCLC 682026940

Elie Apper and Norbert Nozy, saxophones; Helene Luyten, piano and organ; Brussels Youth Orchestra; Hendrik Rycken (1928–2003), conductor; OCLC 682026940
Recorded at the Brussels Academy, November 1975 and July 1976

1. Concerto, by Alexander Glazunov (1865–1936)
2. Adagio, by Tomaso Albinoni (1671–1751)
3. Facetten, Peter Cabus (1923–2000)
4. "Beau Soir" (1877/78), by Claude Debussy (1862–1918)
5. "A pas de loup," Pierre Max Dubois (1930–1995)
6. La fille aux cheveux de lin (1909/10), by Claude Debussy (1862–1918)
- Hommage à de grands musiciens belges, Palette Records (1976); OCLC 23383124, 17418609

Royal Guides Band, Yvon Ducène, conductor
Elie Apper, alto saxophone (on the 3rd piece)

3. Hommage à Sax: diptyque concertant pour saxophone alto et orchestre de chambre (Éditions Alphonse Leduc, 1958), by René Bernier (1905–1984)
- Divertimento for Saxophone Quartet and Orchestra (1965), by Jean Absil (1893–1974), Decca 173428 (LP); OCLC 26380288

National Orchestra of Belgium, Daniel Sternefeld, conductor
François Daneels, soprano saxophone; Clovis Liénard, alto saxophone; Elie Apper, tenor saxophone; Jean Cunche, baritone saxophone

- Récital de clarinette; Récital de saxophone; Quatuor Belge de Saxophones, Alpha DB-94 (LP) (1973); OCLC 20397506

Pierre de Leye, clarinet, Renée Stoefs, piano (in works 1-3); Cappelle Claudine, piano (in works 4-5)
Belgium Saxophone Quartet (in the last work): : François Daneels, soprano saxophone; Clovis Liénard, alto saxophone; Elie Apper, tenor saxophone; Jean Cunche, baritone saxophone

1. Impressions de Cinema, by Léon Stekke (fr) (1904–1970)
2. Reverdies by René Bernier (1905–1984)
3. "Polonaise" Op. 74, by Carl Maria von Weber
4. Intro & Dance, Guy Duijck (1927–2008)
5. Andante & Fileuse, Pierre Petit, saxophone & piano
6. 4 Sequences for 4 Saxophones, by Franz Constant
- François Daneels Saxophone Recital, Buffet Crampon Records BCB 105 (1973); OCLC 23043532

François Daneels, alto saxophone; Claudine Capelle, piano
Belgium Saxophone Quartet (in the last work): : François Daneels, soprano saxophone; Alfred Jacquet, alto saxophone; Elie Apper, tenor saxophone; Jean Cunche, baritone saxophone
Side A

1. Fantaisie Caprice, for saxophone and piano, by Jean Absil (1893–1974)
2. Sisyphus (1971), for saxophone and piano, William Peters Latham
3. Variations, for saxophone quartet, Pierre Max Dubois

== Selected performances ==
- World Saxophone Congress II, 1970, Chicago

Suite on Romanian Themes, Op. 90 (1956), by Jean Absil (1893–1974)
Belgium Saxophone Quartet: François Daneels (1921–2010), soprano saxophone; Alfred Jacquet, alto saxophone; Elie Apper, tenor saxophone; Jean Cunche, baritone saxophone

- BBC Radio 3, 10 March 1975, 11 AM

Belgium Saxophone Quartet: François Daneels (1921–2010), soprano saxophone; Alfred Jacquet, alto saxophone; Elie Apper, tenor saxophone; Jean Cunche, baritone saxophone
Works by Claude Pascal, Jean Absil, and Jean Françaix

== Selected publications ==
- "The European International Saxophone Symposiums," by Elie Apper, The Saxophone Symposium (journal of the North American Saxophone Alliance), Vol. 5, No. 2, Spring 1980; pps. 18–19; ISSN 0271-3705

Elie Apper writes on his experiences and the history of the International Saxophone Symposium
