= Ludwig Strecker =

Owner of the London music publishing B. Schott's Söhne

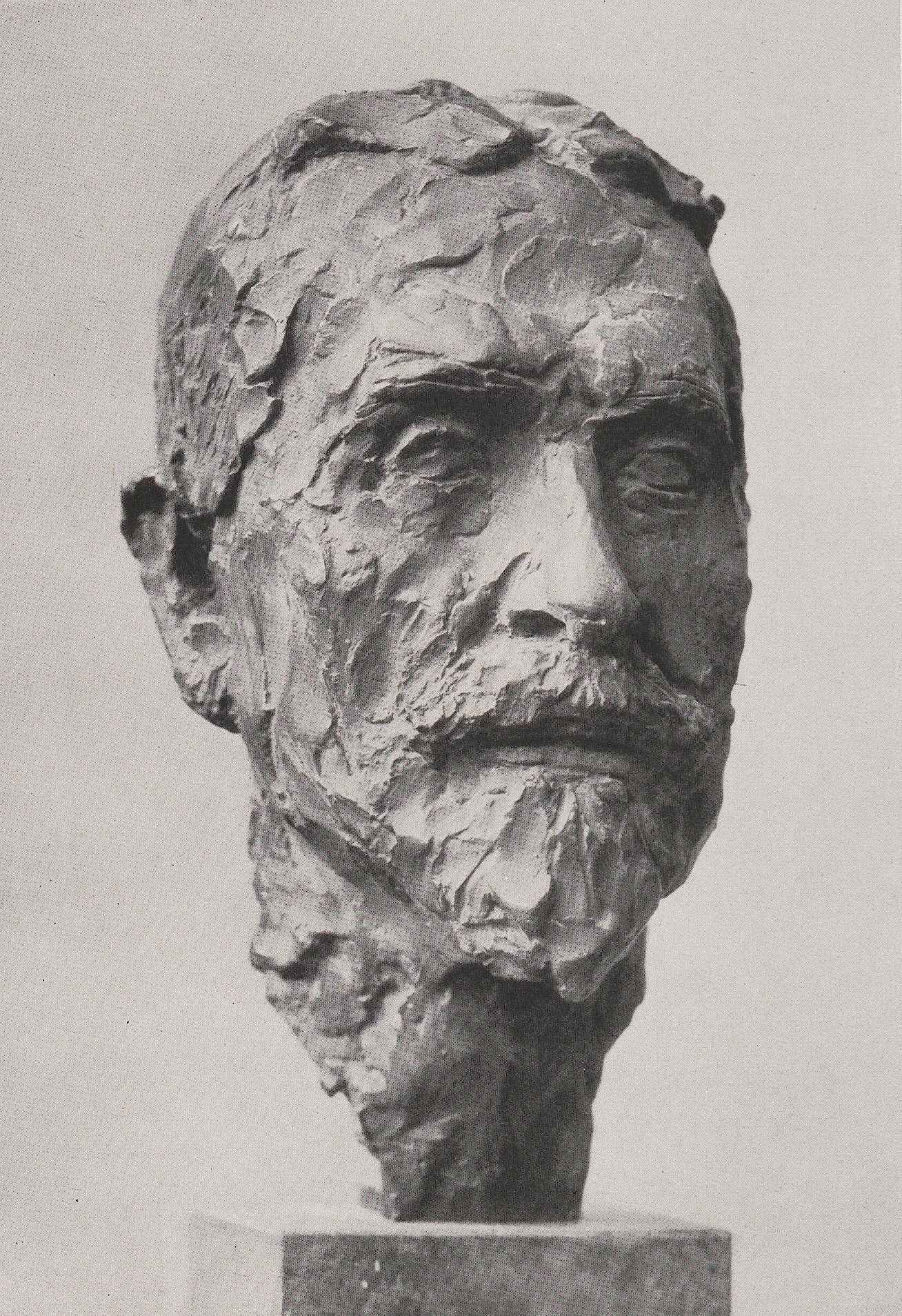
- Bust of Ludwig Strecker, by Ernesto de Fiori (1884–1945)
- Born: Ludwig Philipp Carl Wilhelm Strecker; 16 March 1853; Dieburg, Grand Duchy of Hesse
- Died: 19 December 1943 (aged 90); Mainz, Germany
- Citizenship: German
- Occupations: Businessman, lawyer
- Known for: Former owner of London-based music publishing house, Schott and Co., Limited
- Title: President, B. Schott's Söhne, London
- Spouse: Elisabeth Merck (m. 1883)
- Children: 4

Ludwig Philipp Carl Wilhelm Strecker (16 March 1853 – 19 December 1943) was a German businessman who owned the London-based music publishing house, Schott and Co., Limited. He inherited the London part of the business after working for its previous owner as legal council. The company was held by him and later his family until the Scott publishing house was brought back together in 1980 under the German company named Schott Music GmbH & Co.

== Early life and education ==
Strecker was born to Ludwig Theodor Strecker, a lawyer, and Wilhelmina Friderika Caroline Conradine Franziska Bermann (maiden). At the age of ten, his father moved the family to Darmstadt. Strecker went on to earn a JD degree.

== Career ==
Strecker became the legal counsel of publisher B. Schott's Söhne when it was under Franz Schott's helm. In 1874, he inherited the London division of the publishing business.

In 1874, Strecker as devisee by descent and distribution under the Estate of Franz Schott became the owner of the London publishing business of B. Schott's Söhne. He was not related to the decedent but worked for him for many years. The London publishing firm stayed in his family, passing to his four children, until 1980, when it was merged back into B. Schott's Söhne of Mainz, Germany.

== Inheritance of music publishing firm ==
Franz Schott (1811–1874) – the oldest son of Johann Andreas Schott (1781–1840), who was the oldest son of Bernhard Schott – was the managing director and sole proprietor of B. Schott's Söhne from 1855 until his death. Franz, who had no children, stipulated in his will that B. Schott's Söhne be distributed after the death of his wife, Betty de Braunrasch (1820–1875), as follows:

Mainz

Franz Ritter von Landwehr (born 1865) inherited the publishing business of Mainz while a minor; after reaching majority age, he operated it until retirement in 1911. The publishing house became Schott Music GmbH & Co. KG

Brussels
& Paris
Peter Schott (1857–1894) inherited the publishing business of Brussels and Paris while a minor. On April 5, 1879, two granddaughters of Bernhard Schott who had been managing the Brussels and Paris houses, created the partnership Schott frères. On November 11, 1886, the granddaughters appointed Pierre Schott as sole director; September 30, 1888, Schott frères was liquidated, with Peter Schott serving as liquidator. In 1889, Pierre Schott conveyed the exclusive rights of Schott frères to Otto Junne (1854–1935), a non-family managing partner. The Paris house published under the name Editions Schott. Jean-Jacques Junne (1924–2012), Otto's grandson, had been managing director. He was a jazz saxophonist and band leader known as Jacky June.

Effective January 1, 2007, Schott Music acquired Schott frères from the two main shareholders: Eric Junne and Music & Instruments Distribution (MID). Schott fréres had been domiciled at Ravensteinstraat in Brussels. MID was operating a shop there and Schott frères was running a small publishing catalog. The shop was closed.

London
Ludwig Strecker, Sr., a non-family member and counselor to the firm when it was under Franz Schott's helm, in 1874, inherited the publishing business of London. The London house was founded in 1838 by Adam Joseph Schott (1794–1864) as a branch of B. Schott's Söhne. The branch, since 1849, had been managed by Johann Baptist Wolf (1815–1881) until his death. Upon Wolf's death, Carl Volkert (né Karl Gottlieb Otto Charles Volkert; 1854–1929) and W. B. Lemmer (né William Berkeley Lemmer; 1853–1919) became co-managers. Carl Volkert was the son-in-law of music historian Friedrich Chrysander. In 1909, Strecker's two sons, Ludwig Strecker Jr. (JD) (1883–1978), and Willi (né Wilhelm Strecker; 1884–1958) joined the firm and became directors in 1920. In 1952, Heinz Schneider-Schott (1906–1988) became director. In 1956, Ludwig, Jr., became sole proprietor. In 1974, Peter Hanser-Strecker (JD) (1942–2026) became a director. Peter was a maternal grandson of Ludwig Strecker, Jr., his mother was Marion Hanser (née Strecker-Prätorius; 1912–1970). Arno Volk (1914–1987), the founder of the publishing firm Laaber-Verlag who had held a leading position in the firm since 1957, served as chairman from 1974 to 1977. In 1983, Hanser-Strecker became Chairman and Managing Director. The London publishing house was incorporated in 1924 as Schott and Co., Limited, and changed its name to Schott Music Limited in 2006. The London house has only been in two locations: from 1835 to 1908 at 159 Regent Street and from 1908 to present at 48 Great Marlborough Street. In 1980, Schott and Co., Limited, became part of B. Schott's Söhne, which in 1995 was renamed Schott Music GmbH & Co. KG headquartered in Mainz. As of 2000, the directors were Peter Hanser-Strecker (president), Ludolf Freiherr von Canstein, and Rolf Reisinger.

== Strecker's career (continued) ==
In Strecker, Sr.'s, role as head of B. Schott's Söhne, he was a publisher for Richard Wagner, who made challenging demands that frequently culminated in financial duress. Nonetheless, Strecker, Sr., in a succession of renegotiations for moderate compromises, after each, was able to compensate Wagner. B. Schott's Söhne published Siegfried Idyll (1877) and Parsifal (1882).

Strecker was involved in the Mainz Oratorio Society (de), currently known as the Mainzer Singing Academy – which has endured for one hundred and ninety-five years. Strecker was its president for 25 years.

== Recognition ==
- Awarded the title of Secret Commercial Council by Grand Duke Ernst Ludwig
- 1909: He was appointed by Grand Duke Ernst Ludwig as a lifelong member of the first chamber of the Provinces of the Grand Duchy of Hesse (de), of which he was a member until the German Revolution of 1918–1919

== Personal life ==
Strecker – on March 9, 1883, in Darmstadt – married Elisabeth Merck (maiden; 1862–1947), the daughter of Georg Franz Merck (1825–1873), a Darmstadt entrepreneur, and Antoinette Wilhelmine Caroline Schenck (maiden; 1830–1908). The couple had three sons and a daughter. When Ludwig Strecker, Sr., died in 1943, his oldest son, Ludwig Strecker Jr., took over the management of the publishing house with his second oldest son, Wilhelm as manager and director. Ludwig Strecker, Sr., is buried in the main cemetery in Mainz. Strecker, Sr.'s, third and youngest son, Paul Strecker (1898–1950) was an artist and writer who painted and designed sets for opera and theater.
