= Doktor Johannes Faust =

1936 opera by Hermann Reutter

- Opera by Hermann Reutter
- Librettist: Ludwig Andersen
- Language: German
- Based on: Puppet play Doktor Faust
- Premiere: 26 May 1936; Oper Frankfurt

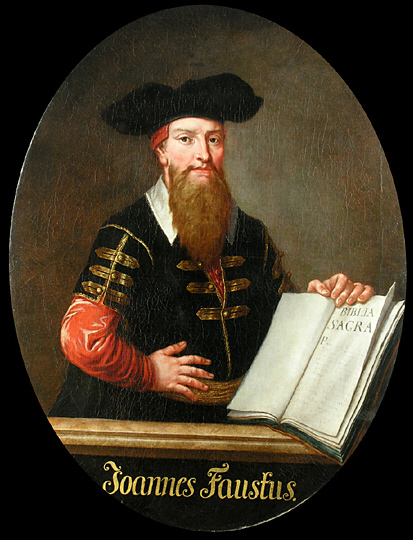
Idealized portrait of Johannes Faust (c. 1400–1466)

Doktor Johannes Faust, Op. 47, is an opera in three acts by Hermann Reutter. The libretto was written by Ludwig Andersen (pen name of Ludwig Strecker Jr.), based on an old puppet play Doktor Faust on the Faust topic. The opera was premiered by the Oper Frankfurt at its house (now the Alte Oper) on 26 May 1936, staged by Walter Felsenstein. It was published by Schott. A revised version was first performed at the Staatstheater Stuttgart on 8 June 1955, conducted by Ferdinand Leitner.

== History ==
Reutter composed Doktor Johannes Faust as an opera in three acts and five scenes to a libretto which Ludwig Andersen based on an old puppet play Doktor Faust on the Faust topic, in a version by Karl Simrock. Andersen was the pen name of Ludwig Strecker, director and editor of the music publisher Schott-Verlag. Strecker published the opera for Schott, the libretto in 1935 and the score in 1936.

The opera was premiered by the Oper Frankfurt at its house (now the Alte Oper) on 26 May 1936, staged by Walter Felsenstein and conducted by Bertil Wetzelsberger. It was a success. The premiere in Austria was on 18 December 1940 at the Graz Opera, conducted by Karl Fischer, with Alfred Schütz as Mephisto. A revised version was presented at the Staatstheater Stuttgart on 8 June 1955, staged by Kurt Puhlmann and conducted by Ferdinand Leitner. This performance was recorded, with Bernd Heyer as Faust and Gustav Neidlinger as Mephisto.

Reutter tried to create a people's opera (Volksoper), similar to Werner Egk's Die Zaubergeige, which was also composed to a libretto by Andersen and published by Schott. The music is moderately progressive, using many dances. The opera, which takes about two hours to perform, is set in Mainz and Parma in the 16th century. It is one of many adaptations of the Faust topic.

== Roles ==
The roles and their voice types are, according to the publisher:

Roles and voice types
Role	Voice type
Doktor Johannes Faust	baritone
Wagner, his famulus	tenor
Mephistopheles	bass
Herzog von Parma (Duke of Parma)	tenor
Bianca, Herzogin von Parma (his wife)	soprano
Hans Wurst	buffo tenor
Gretel	soprano
Der gute Geist (The good spirit)	soprano
Seneschall	tenor
Balzer, der erste Zecher	tenor
Riches, der zweite Zecher	tenor
Done, der dritte Zecher	bass
Schambes, der vierte Zecher	bass
Vier Marktweiber (four market women)	2 sopranos, 2 contraltos
Drei Studenten aus Krakau (three students from Krakow)	tenor, baritone, bass
Auerhahn	tenor
Krumpschnabel	baritone
Hofleute, Studenten, Kinder, Volk, Gute Geister, Höllische Geister (court people, students, children, folk, good spirits, hellish spirits)	chorus, ballet dancers and extras
