= Paul Strecker =

German painter

Paul Strecker (13 August 1898 Mainz – 6 March 1950 Berlin) was a German artist and writer who painted and designed sets for opera and theater.

== Career highlights ==
Between 1919 and 1922, Strecker studied art at the Academy of Fine Arts, Munich, then for two more years at the Academy of Arts, Berlin. In the summer of 1924, he spent an extended period in Rome studying the works of great masters.

Strecker moved to Paris in 1926 to work as a freelance painter up until the Nazi occupation, at which time he fled to the south of France. In 1945 he returned to Germany, settling in Berlin. In 1946, he began working as a set designer for the Berlin State Opera and, that same year, became a lecturer at the Berlin University of the Arts, and, soon thereafter, became a full professor.

Strecker was a member of the Berliner Neuen Gruppe. Paul Strecker died March 6, 1950, in Berlin, at the age of 51. He was the younger brother of Ludwig Strecker Jr. (1883–1978) and Wilhelm Strecker (1884–1958) and son of Ludwig Strecker, Sr. (1853–1943), the three of whom were partners in the family-run music publishing firm Schott and Co., Limited.

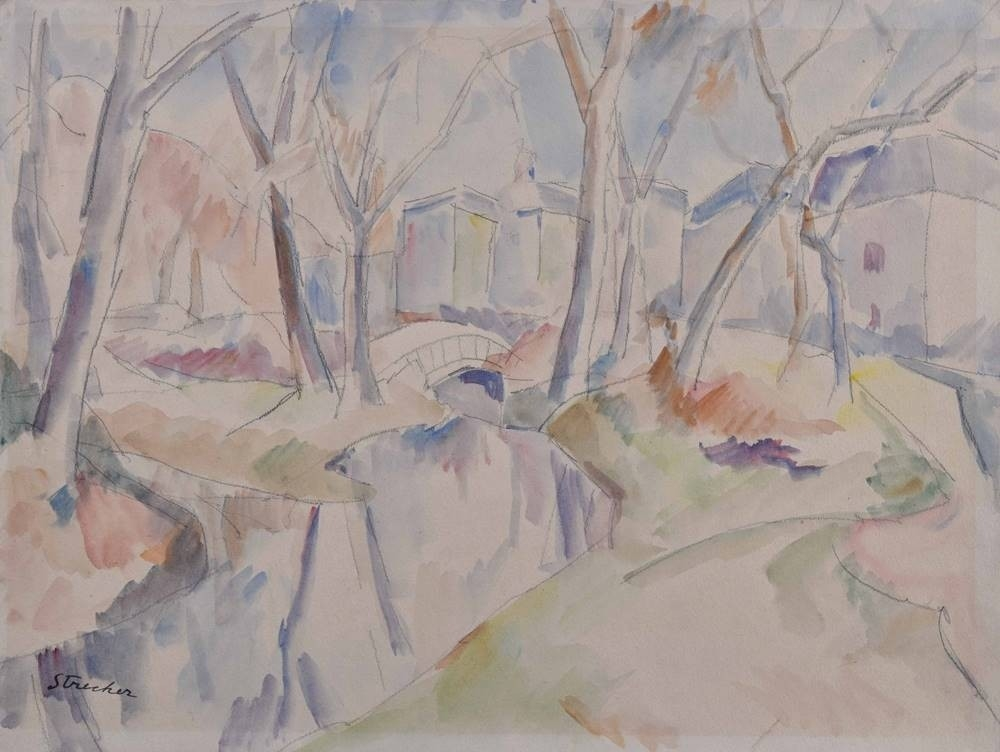
"Im Park" by Paul Strecker (1924)

== Selected works ==
- "Morgen am Montmartre" ("Morning in Montmartre")
- "Eiffelturm" ("Eiffel Tower")
- "Consierge" ("Concierge")
- "Hafen von Toulon" ("Port of Toulon")
- "Die Flieger"
- "Spanier" ("Spanish")

== Selected literary works ==
- Die Brücke von Avignon (The Avignon Bridge), foreword by Alexander Koval, Bonn: Auer-Presse (1950) (with panels) OCLC 250478948
