= Léontine de Maësen =

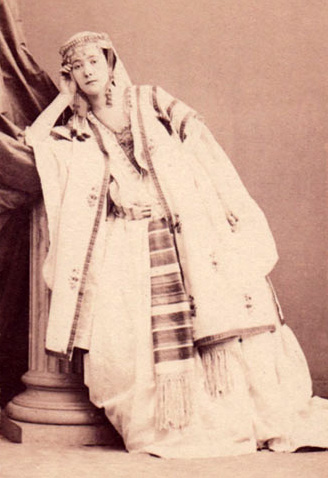
Léontine de Maësen in costume, likely for Les pêcheurs de perles (photographed by Disdéri circa 1863)

Léontine de Maësen (15 July 1835 – 1906) was a Belgian lyric coloratura soprano active on the opera stages of France from 1858 to 1868. She is most remembered today for having created the role of Leïla in Bizet's 1863 opera, Les pêcheurs de perles.

== Life and career ==
Born Léontine Van der Maësen d'Avionpuits in Esneux, Belgium, she was the daughter of the crown prosecutor in Verviers. Her father died when she was still a young girl, and after his death she entered the Royal Conservatory of Liège where she studied singing with Théophile Vercken. She then continued her studies at the Paris Conservatory with Laure Cinti-Damoreau and later with Gilbert Duprez. De Maësen made her stage debut in Marseille during the 1858 season and subsequently sang there as Marguerite in Faust and Lucie in Lucie de Lammermoor. She returned in the 1861-62 season and sang with great success the title role in Massé's La reine Topaze for its first Marseille performance. During that season, she also sang in revivals of The Marriage of Figaro and Der Freischütz. After performances in Lille, she was engaged by Léon Carvalho for his Théâtre Lyrique company in Paris, where in 1863 she created the role of Leïla in Bizet's Les pêcheurs de perles. Her performance in the premiere was a sensation with the audience, according to the critic in Le Guide musical, who went on to praise "the beauty of her voice, the perfection of her singing, her personal charm, and her talent as actress." Bizet would later dedicate his 1868 mélodie, "Rêve de la bien-aimée" (Dream of the beloved), to her.

After Les pêcheurs de perles, she remained with the Théâtre Lyrique company, creating the roles of Christel in Edmond Chérouvrier's Le roi des mines and Anita in Poniatowski's L'aventurier (both in 1865) as well as singing Gilda in Rigoletto, Norina in Don Pasquale, and the title role in Norma. In the late 1860s she married Alfred Rabaud, a wealthy businessman and patron of the arts from Marseille, and retired from the stage. With her husband she ran a salon frequented by many young composers of the day and devoted herself to charity in her later years. Alfred Rabaud died in 1886. Léontine lived on for another 20 years, dying in Marseille at the age of 70. Her younger sister Camilla was also a well-known soprano who sang in Belgium, France and Italy.

== Sources ==
- Casaglia, Gherardo (2005). "Maësen". L'Almanacco di Gherardo Casaglia (in Italian).
- Heugel, Henri (11 February 1906). "Nécrologie", Le Ménestrel, Vol. 72, No. 6, p. 48 (in French)
- Le Guide musical (13 February 1862). "Belgique", Vol. 7, No. 50, p. 2 (in French)
- Masson, Paul and Barré, Henri (1913). "Rabaud (Alfred)", Les Bouches-du-Rhône: Encyclopédie départementale, Part 2, Vol. 11, p. 412. Archives départementales les Bouches-du-Rhône (in French)
- Ruelle, Jules (8 October 1863). "France", Le Guide musical, Vol. 9, No. 41, p. 3 (in French)
- Soubies, Albert (1900). Histoire de la musique. E. Fammarion (in French)
