= François Daneels =

Classical saxophonist

François Daneels (born 1921 Tubize, Belgium—20 April 2010 Tubize, Belgium) was an internationally renowned virtuoso classical saxophonist, a prolific composer, and music educator from Belgium. From 1954 to 1981, Daneels was professor of saxophone at his alma mater, the Royal Conservatory of Brussels.

== Education & career ==
Daneels studied music at the Royal Conservatory of Brussels, earning First Prize with Great Distinction in 1939. He had been a distinguished professor at the Conservatory since 1954. He has performed internationally, including in the United States, Germany, Switzerland, Canada, Hungary, former Czechoslovakia, and Denmark. More than forty compositions for solo saxophone were specifically written for him. Daneels also founded the Belgian Saxophone Quartet in 1953 and took it on a world tour that year. He also founded the Belgian Saxophone Quintet, the Belgium Saxophone Septet, and the Belgium Saxophone Octet. He is widely known for having founded the Belgian School of Saxophone, which he described as a blend of the French School of Marcel Mule and the American School—a mixture characterized by the quality of sound, rhythmic rigor, observance of nuances, and respect of the text of pieces studied. When Daneels retired from the Royal Conservatory of Brussels in 1981, one of his former students, Alain Crépin, succeeded him.

Daneels founded the School of Music of Tubize (l'école de musique de Tubize) in 1962, and, in addition to his duties at the Royal Conservatory of Brussels, served as director and professor there until 1974. The school has since been elevated to academy status, and, in 2004, was renamed Académie François Daneels.

Daneels was the founding president of International Adolphe Sax Association in 1994, and served in that role until 2004. Beginning 1994, the association has hosted the International Adolphe Sax Competition every 4 years in Dinant, the birthplace of Adolphe Sax. For the competition, Daneels was chairman of the music committee for the 1994, 1998, and 2002 competitions. In January 1999, he was declared Honorary Citizen of the City of Dinant.

== Selected discography ==
- Concertos for Saxophone, Decca 173018 (1960) OCLC 26653941 LCCN 62-2011

1. "Double Concerto for Alto, Saxophone, Piano, and Orchestra," Op. 34 (1946), Raymomd Chevreuille, composer

Daneels, saxophone; Marcel Gazelle, piano; Orchestre national de Belgique; Raymomd Chevreuille (1901–1976), conductor

2. "Divertimento for Saxophone Quartet and Orchestra," Op. 86, Jean Absil, composer

Belgium Saxophone Quartet; Orchestre national de Belgique; René Defossez, conductor

3. "Piano Concerto No. 2," Jean Louël

Philibert Mees (1929–2006), piano; Orchestre national de Belgique; René Defossez, conductor

- Saxophone en Concert, Zéphyr Records (Brussels) (1974) OCLC 16715188
- Saxo-Retro, Zéphyr Records (Brussels) (1974) OCLC 34365360
- Kaleidosax, Horizon Records (Tucson, Arizona) (1992) OCLC 50852497
- The Classical Saxophone, Decca Records (1975) OCLC 7590614, 67405309
- Récital de clarinette; Récital de saxophone; Quatuor Belge de Saxophones, Alpha Records (Paris) (1973) OCLC 20397506
- François Daneels, soloist on tracks 4 & 6, Buffet Crampon OCLC 7570083

Track 4: "Suite," for saxophone, André Waignein (composer)
Track 6: J.S. Bach

- Récital de saxophone
1. "Fantaisie caprice," Op. 152, Jean Absil (1971), Daneels (soloist)
2. "Sisyphus 1971," William P. Latham (1971), Daneels (soloist)
3. "Variations," Pierre Max Dubois, Belgium Saxophone Quartet OCLC 2710951
- Oeuvres de Jean Absil Decca Records (195?) OCLC 37200912

Track 4: "Batterie," opus 29 (1937), text by Jean Cocteau, Daneels (soloist) OCLC 37200912

- François Daneels, alto saxophone, Harmonia Mundi (no date) OCLC 18174066

Westvlaams Orkest, Dirk Varendonck, conductor

1. "Ballade pour saxo, alto et archets," Marcel Poot
2. "Divertimento pour petit orchestre," Marcel Poot

== Compositions dedicated to Daneels ==
- "Fantaisie Caprice," for saxophone and orchestra, Op. 152, Jean Absil (1970) OCLC 463454481
- "A Tribute to Sax," for saxophone and concert band, Alain Crépin (1993); piano version OCLC 36300984

== Notable students ==
- Elie Apper
- Fabrizio Cassol
- Alain Crépin
- John Giordano
- Norbert H. J. Nozy
- Marco Pütz (nl) (born 1958)
- Noël Samyn (fr)
