= Bernhard Schott =

German clarinetist and music publisher

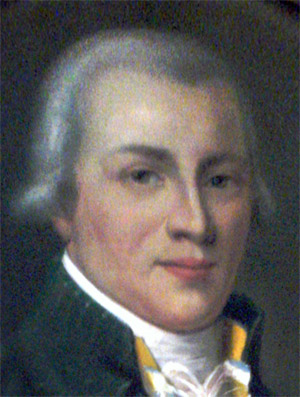
- Bernhard Schott, c. 1780
- Born: 9 August 1748; Eltville am Rhein
- Died: 26 April 1809 (aged 60); Heidesheim am Rhein
- Education: University of Mainz
- Occupation: Music publisher
- Years active: 1770-1809
- Spouse(s): Antonetta (Antoinette) née Hübsch (Mainz, 1753–1827; m. 1780)
- Children: Johann Andreas (1781–1840, s.); Johann Josef (1782–1855, s.); Maria Theresia (born 1785, d.); Maria Katharina (born 1787, d.); Adam Josef (1794–1864, s.)
- Parent(s): Nicolaus and Maria Elisabeth
- Relatives: Franz Philipp (1763-1840, brother, Notenstecher and violinist)

Bernhard Peter Schott (9 August 1748 – 26 April 1809) was a German clarinetist and music publisher. He founded the predecessor of Schott Music, a major German music publishing company which continues to this day.

== Biography ==
Schott was the eldest child of Nicolaus Schott (1716–92), a baker and innkeeper who had a sideline as a Notenstecher, (Note: Notenstecher is an obsolete profession. It involved the engraving of copper plates for the printing of sheet music.) and his wife Maria Elisabeth née Bakkers. From 1762 to 1764, he served an apprenticeship in engraving and printing at Strasbourg. He subsequently travelled to the Netherlands, France and England. He studied philosophy at the University of Mainz, and was in 1769 awarded the degree of Magister artium. In 1770, he established a business in Mainz to print and sell sheet music. Around the same time, he trained as a clarinetist; perhaps under Peter Krauß, court clarinetist at Mainz. From 1771 to 1773, he played in a military band at Strasbourg. He studied further in Paris under Joseph Beer (1744–1811), one of the first clarinet virtuosi.

On 14 June 1780, he was appointed court music printer to Charles Frederick, Grand Duke of Baden (1728–1811), with exclusive rights; perhaps an unusual appointment, because in 1780 Mainz was the seat of the Electorate of Mainz, a state next to but distinct from the Grand Duchy of Baden. In 1785, he was awarded the privilege of Bürgerrecht by the city of Mainz, and also issued his first catalogue of music for sale. He published, among other things, first editions of piano reductions of Mozart's Die Entführung aus dem Serail (1785) and Don Giovanni (1791), works by Johann Franz Xaver Sterkel and Antonio Rosetti, and salon music. During the political upheavals associated with the Napoleonic Wars, which included the overthrow of the Electorate of Mainz by the short-lived Republic of Mainz (1793), its reinstatement, its further overthrow by the Cisrhenian Republic (1797), its further reinstatement, and the abolition not only of the Electorate but of the Holy Roman Empire itself (1806), he dealt, in addition to music, in stationery, paper and wine.

After his death, his sons continued the music business under the name B. Schotts Söhne, and expanded it across Europe. That firm later passed out of family hands, and eventually became the modern company Schott Music.

== See also ==
- Schott frères, a Belgian sheet music publishing house that began in 1823 as the Belgium branch of B. Schotts Söhne
