= Jan Koetsier =

Dutch composer and conductor (1911-2006)

Jan Koetsier (14 August 1911 in Amsterdam – 28 April 2006 in Munich) was a Dutch composer and conductor.

In 1950, Koetsier became the first Kapellmeister of the Bavarian Radio Symphony Orchestra. As a composer, he wrote chamber music,orchestral and choral works, as well as the opera Frans Hals. From 1966 to 1976, he taught conducting at the Hochschule für Musik und Theater München.

A well-known example of his composition is Brass Symphony from 1979, which is divided into three movements and arranged for a brass dectet.

In 1992, the Jan Koetsier Foundation was established by an endowment from the composer. One of the main responsibilities of the Foundation, which has been based at the Hochschule since 2001, is the organization of the biennial International Jan Koetsier Competition.

== Selected works ==
- Variation uber ein Kinderliend for orchestra (1932, revised 1967)
- Serenata serena for string orchestra, Op. 11 (1936, revised 1953)
- Concertino for viola and orchestra, Op. 21 (1940, revised 1955)
- Symphony No. 2 for choir and orchestra (1947)
- Partita for cor anglais and organ (1956)
- Partita 'Wachet auf, ruft uns die Stimme' for trombone and organ, Op. 41, No. 3 (1976)
- Cinq Impromptus for trombone quartet, Op. 55 (1970)
- Sonatina trombone and piano, Op. 58, No. 1 (1970)
- Allegro maestoso for bass trombone and piano, Op. 58, No. 2 (1972)
- Kolloquium for brass ensemble, Op. 67b (1978)
- Duo Giocoso for trumpet (or oboe) and viola, Op. 69 (1979)
- Concertino for tuba and orchestra, Op. 77 (1978/rev. 1982)
- Introduction and Variations on a Theme from the Opera "Die Zaubergeige" by Werner Egk for viola and piano, Op. 82, No. 3 (1978)
- Concertino Drammatico for violin, viola and string orchestra, Op. 88 (1981)
- Ballade for cor anglais and piano, Op. 90 (1981)
- Concertino for trombone and string orchestra, Op. 91 (1982)
- II. Duo Concertante for cello, bassoon and orchestra, Op. 92 (1983)
- Franzosiche Konzert for two flutes and string orchestra, Op. 98
- Piet-Hein-variaties for carillon, Op. 99
- Grassauer Zwiefacher for trombone quartet, Op. 105/3b (1986)
- Concertino for trombone quartet and string orchestra, Op. 115 (1988)
- Zürcher Marsch variations for trombone and piano, Op. 116 (1989)
- Max und Moritz, Suite in 7 Streichen for trombone quartet and speaker/narrator, Op. 127 (1991)
- Falstaffiade for solo bass trombones and 3 tenor trombones, Op. 134 (1993)
- Wolkenschatten for tuba quartet, Op. 136 (1993)
- Die Bremer Stadtmusikanten for trombone quartet, Op. 138 (1994)

== Discography ==
- II. Duo Concertante for Violoncello, Bassoon and Orchestra, Op. 92. MiX-5: Premiere Recordings for Bassoon and Cello. Lynne Feller-Marshall, bassoon; John Marshall, cello. 2011. CD. With music by Martin Zalba Ibanez, Mike Curtis, Guang Yu Liu, Paul Desmond, Max Stern, Arthur Frackenpohl, Paul Hindemith, Béla Bartók, and Jimi Hendrix.
- Franzosische Konzert, op. 98 for two flutes and string orchestra. World premiere. Flutes: Andras Adorjan, Marianne Henkel, 'Franz Liszt' chamber orchestra, János Rolla. CD with music by C.P.E Bach, Ignaz Pleyel.
