= Hermann Reutter =

German musician

- Born: 17 June 1900; Stuttgart, Kingdom of Württemberg, German Empire
- Died: 1 January 1985 (aged 84); Heidenheim an der Brenz, Baden-Württemberg, West Germany
- Education: Musikhochschule München
- Occupations: Pianist; Lied accompanist; Composer; Academic teacher
- Organizations: Musikhochschule Stuttgart; Dr. Hoch's Konservatorium; Musikhochschule München; Internationale Hugo-Wolf-Akademie
- Awards: Order of Merit of the Federal Republic of Germany; Hugo Wolf Medal (Vienna)

Hermann Reutter (German: [ˈhɛʁman ˈʁɔʏtɐ]; 17 June 1900 – 1 January 1985) was a German composer and pianist who worked as an academic teacher, university administrator, recitalist, and accompanist. He composed several operas, orchestral works, and chamber music, and especially many lieder, setting poems by authors writing in German, Russian, Spanish, Icelandic, English, and ancient Egyptian and Greek, among others.

He was director of Dr. Hoch's Konservatorium in Frankfurt from 1936 to 1945 and of the Musikhochschule Stuttgart from 1956 to 1966. He then taught master classes, regularly at the Musikhochschule München and at universities in the United States, Europe, and Japan. He founded the Internationale Hugo-Wolf-Akademie in Stuttgart in 1968, serving as its president until his death.

== Career ==
Reutter was born in Stuttgart, where he took singing lessons with Emma Rückbeil-Hiller. He moved to Munich in 1920 and studied voice with Karl Erler and then, at the Musikhochschule München, piano with Franz Dorfmüller, organ with Ludwig Mayer, and composition with Walter Courvoisier.

He took part in the Donaueschingen Festival from 1923 and had contact to the "Donaueschingen circle", especially to Paul Hindemith. From 1926, he was a frequent composer at the annual festival of the Allgemeiner Deutscher Musikverein, for several world premieres of his works. He focused on lied recitals as an accompanist from 1929, working with notable singers and conductors of the period. Between 1930 and 1936, he toured the U.S. seven times as the accompanist of singer Sigrid Onegin.

In 1932, Reutter was appointed principal composition professor at the Musikhochschule Stuttgart. He composed the opera Lübecker Totentanz based on the art work at the Marienkirche in Lübeck. Reutter was a member of the Nazi Party. In 1936, his opera Doktor Johannes Faust was premiered at the Oper Frankfurt. The same year, he became the director of Dr. Hoch's Konservatorium in Frankfurt, which was called the Staatliche Musikhochschule after 1938.

After World War II, he returned to Stuttgart. He took part in the inaugural Ferienkurse für internationale neue Musik in Darmstadt in 1946, and accompanied Henny Wolff in selections from Mahler's Lieder eines fahrenden Gesellen, songs from Ernst Krenek's Reisetagebuch, Op. 62, and his own compositions. In 1948 and 1949, he was an instructor there for lied singing and its accompaniment. In 1951, a concert at the festival of the Bavarian Radio Symphony Orchestra, conducted by Eugen Jochum, presented his Concerto for Two Pianos, Op. 63, with him and Hans Schröter as soloists.

In 1950, Reutter composed a "Hymne an Deutschland" which President Theodor Heuss suggested as the national anthem, but it was not chosen. From 1952, he was professor of composition and lied interpretation at the Stuttgart Musikhochschule. In 1955, he became a member of the Akademie der Künste in Berlin and the Bayerische Akademie der Schönen Künste in Munich. He served as a juror of the ARD International Music Competition from 1956, and later as chairman of the jury in the category Singing. Reutter became the director of the Musikhochschule Stuttgart in 1956 and director emeritus in 1966. He taught internationally from 1960 in master classes at several universities in the U.S., Europe and Japan. He held a master class for lied at the Musikhochschule München from 1966 to 1974. He founded the Hugo Wolf Academy in Stuttgart in 1968, and served as its president.

== Private life ==
Reutter married Liselotte Lauk in 1940. The couple had two daughters and a son. Reutter died in Heidenheim an der Brenz.

== Awards ==
Reutter received, among others, the Ludwig Spohr Award of Braunschweig in 1953, the Grand Cross of the Order of Merit of the Federal Republic of Germany in 1959 (with one star in 1975), an honorary doctorate from the Music and Arts Institute in San Francisco in 1976, and the Hugo Wolf Medal of the International Hugo Wolf Society in Vienna the same year.

== Works ==
Reutter's compositions are published by Schott Music:

=== Stage ===
- Saul, opera in 1 act, Op. 33 (1928, 2nd version 1947); libretto based on the play by Alexander Lernet-Holenia
- Der verlorene Sohn, opera in 5 scenes, Op. 34 (1929); libretto by Rainer Maria Rilke after André Gide; revised in 1952 as the oratorio Die Rückkehr des verlorenen Sohnes
- Die Prinzessin und der Schweinehirt, musical drama in 10 scenes (1938); libretto after Hans Christian Andersen
- Der Lübecker Totentanz, ein altes Mysterienspiel, Op. 35 (1948)
- Der neue Hiob, ein Lehrstück (didactic drama) for soloists, chorus, piano and string orchestra, Op. 37 (1930); libretto by Robert Seitz
- Doktor Johannes Faust, opera in 3 acts, Op. 47 (1936, revised 1955); libretto by Ludwig Andersen based on the puppet play by Karl Joseph Simrock
- Die Kirmes von Delft, ballet in 4 scenes, Op. 48 (1937)
- Odysseus, opera in 3 acts, Op. 55 (1942); libretto by Rudolf Bach
- Der Weg nach Freudenstadt. Ballade der Landstraße in 5 scenes, Op. 66 (1948); libretto by Sonja Korty
- Don Juan und Faust, opera in 7 scenes, Op. 75 (1950); libretto by Ludwig Andersen after Christian Dietrich Grabbe
- Topsy. Ein Spiel nach einer Idee von Sonia Korty, Op. 76 (1950); libretto by Fred Schmitz based on the idea by Sonja Korty
- Notturno Montmartre, ballet in 4 scenes (1952)
- Die Witwe von Ephesus, opera in 1 act (1954, 2nd version 1965); libretto by Ludwig Andersen after Petronius
- Der Tod des Empedokles, "Concerto Scenico" in 2 acts (1954, 2nd version 1966); libretto by Friedrich Hölderlin
- Die Brücke von San Luis Rey, scenes from the novel The Bridge of San Luis Rey by Thornton Wilder (1954); 2 versions; libretto by Gerhard Reutter
- Hamlet, opera in 5 acts (1979–1980); libretto by August Wilhelm Schlegel after William Shakespeare

=== Orchestral ===
- Die Kirmes von Delft, ballet suite, Op. 48 (1937)
- Tanz-Variationen, Op. 76a (1951)
- Notturno Montmartre, ballet suite (1952)
- Sinfonie for string orchestra (1960)
- Figurinen zu Hofmannsthals "Jedermann" (1972)

=== Concertante ===
- Concerto No. 1 for piano and chamber orchestra, Op. 19 (1926)
- Sinfonische Fantasie, concerto no. 3 for piano and orchestra, Op. 50 (1938)
- Concerto No. 4 "Variation über ein eigenes Thema in einem Satz" (Variations on an Original Theme in One Movement) in G minor, Op. 62 (1947)
- Concerto in E♭ in one movement for 2 pianos and orchestra, Op. 63 (1947)
- Concertino for piano and string orchestra, Op. 69 (1947)
- Konzertvariationen (Concert Variations) for piano and orchestra (1951)
- Aus dem Hohelied Salomonis (From the Song of Solomon), concerto grosso for alto, viola, piano and orchestra (1956)
- Prozession, dialogue for cello and orchestra (1957); written for and premiered by cellist Gaspar Cassadó
- Capriccio, Aria und Finale for piano and orchestra (1963)
- Epitaph für Ophelia for violin and chamber orchestra (or piano) (1979)

=== Chamber music ===
- Rhapsodie for violin and piano, Op. 51 (1939)
- Musik for viola and piano (1951)
- Cinco Caprichos sobre Cervantes (5 Caprices on Cervantes) for viola solo (1968)
- Pièce concertante for alto saxophone and piano (1968)
- Sonata Monotematica for cello or bassoon and piano (1972)

=== Piano ===
- Fantasia apocalyptica, Op. 7 (1926)
- Variationen über den Choral "Komm, süßer Tod, komm, sel'ge Ruh'!" von Johann Sebastian Bach, Op. 15 (1928)
- Die Passion in 9 Inventionen aus den "Biblischen Szenen", Op. 25 (1930); also for guitar (1984)
- Tanz-Suite (Dance Suite), Op. 29
- Kleine Klavierstücke (Little Piano Pieces), Op. 28

=== Vocal ===
Reutter set poems by various Russian authors, Rainer Maria Rilke, Friedrich Rückert, Federico García Lorca, Icelandic poems, Friedrich Hölderlin, ancient Egyptian poems, Goethe, Sappho and Langston Hughes, among many others.

- 3 Gesänge for medium voice and string quartet or string orchestra, Op. 3 (1937); words by Friedrich Hölderlin
- Russische Lieder (Russian Songs), 8 songs for voice and piano, Op. 21 (1927); words by Fyodor Tyutchev, Calzow, Sergei Yesenin and Leo Tolstoy
- Missa brevis for alto, violin and cello, Op. 22 (1930)
- Russische Lieder (Russian Songs), 6 songs for voice and piano, Op. 23 (1930); words by Leo Tolstoy, Mikhail Lermontov, Calzow, Afanasy Fet and Alexander Blok
- Die Weise von Liebe und Tod des Cornets Christoph Rilke for medium voice and piano, Op. 31 (1947); words by Rainer Maria Rilke
- Solokantate nach Worten des Matthias Claudius (Solo-Cantata on words of Matthias Claudius) for alto, viola and piano (or organ), Op. 45 (1948)
- 4 Lieder for voice and piano, Op. 54 (1941); words by Friedrich Rückert
- 3 Gesänge for low voice and piano, Op. 56 (1944); words by Friedrich Hölderlin
- Fünf antike Oden nach Gedichten von Sappho (5 Ancient Odes after Poetry of Sappho) for mezzo-soprano, viola and piano, Op. 57 (1947)
- 5 Lieder for low voice and piano, Op. 58 (1945); words by Theodor Storm
- 9 Lieder und Gesänge for high voice and piano, Op. 59 (1948); words by Gottfried Keller
- 3 Lieder for high voice and piano, Op. 60 (1946); words by Matthias Claudius
- 3 Lieder for high voice and piano, Op. 61 (1945); words by Clemens Brentano
- 3 Lieder nach Gedichten von Friedrich Hölderlin for high voice and piano, Op. 67 (1946–1947); words by Friedrich Hölderlin
- Russische Lieder (Russian Songs), 7 songs for voice and piano, Op. 68 (1947); words by Leo Tolstoy, Sergei Yesenin and Nikolay Gumilev
- 7 Gesänge aus "Gesicht und Antlitz" (Ehrler-Zyklus I) for baritone and piano, Op. 64 (1948); words by Hans Heinrich Ehrler
- 12 Lieder aus "Gesicht und Antlitz" (Ehrler-Zyklus II) for high voice and piano, Op. 65 (1948); words by Hans Heinrich Ehrler
- Lyrisches Konzert for soprano, flute, piano, timpani and string orchestra, Op. 70 (1948); words by Eckart Peterich
- Sechs Gedichte aus "Westöstlicher Diwan" for soprano, baritone and piano, Op. 73 (1949); words by Johann Wolfgang von Goethe
- Monolog der Iphigenie for female voice and orchestra, Op. 74 (1949); words by Johann Wolfgang von Goethe
- Hymne an Deutschland for medium voice and piano (1950); words by Rudolf Alexander Schröder
- Der himmlische Vagant, Lyrisches Portrait des François Villon for alto, baritone and chamber orchestra (1951); words by François Villon
- Lieder der Liebe, 4 Gedichte for soprano and piano (1951); words by Ricarda Huch
- Kleines geistliches Konzert nach Worten von Christian Wagner (Little Sacred Concerto on Words of Christian Wagner) for alto and viola (1953)
- Spanischer Totentanz, 5 Poems for 2 medium voices and orchestra (1953); words by Federico García Lorca
- Aus dem Hohelied Salomonis (From the Song of Solomon), Concerto Grosso for alto, viola, piano and orchestra (1956)
- 3 Zigeunerromanzen for voice and piano (1956); words by Federico García Lorca
- Meine dunklen Hände, 5 Negergedichte for baritone and piano (1956); words by Langston Hughes and Arna Bontemps
- Die Jahreszeiten, 4 Gedichte for medium voice and piano (1957); words by Friedrich Hölderlin
- 6 späte Gedichte for voice and piano (1957); words by Ricarda Huch
- Weltlicht, 7 Icelandic poems for bass and orchestra (1959); words based on the novel Heimsljós (World Light) by Halldór Laxness
- Kleine Ballade von den drei Flüssen for soprano and chamber orchestra or piano (1960); words by Federico García Lorca
- Ein kleines Requiem for bass, cello and piano (1961); words by Federico García Lorca
- Andalusiana, Arien und Intermezzi for soprano and orchestra or piano (1962); words by Federico García Lorca
- Ein Füllen ward geboren, Chanson Variée in 3 Strophen for medium voice and piano (1962)
- Epitaph für einen Dichter for high voice and piano (1962); words from A Green Bough by William Faulkner
- 5 Fragmente nach Friedrich Hölderlin for tenor and piano (1965); words by Friedrich Hölderlin
- Drei Monologe des Empedokles for baritone and orchestra or piano (1966); words by Friedrich Hölderlin
- Szene und Monolog der Marfa for soprano and orchestra (1966); words from the play Demetrius by Friedrich Schiller
- Sankt Sebastian, Triptychon for baritone and piano (1968); words by E. F. Sommer
- Bogenschützen, Vocals for high voice and piano (1971); words by Federico García Lorca
- 9 Lieder nach Gedichten von Ricarda Huch for voice and piano (1971); words by Ricarda Huch
- Chamber Music, 4 selected poems for low male voice and piano (1972); words by James Joyce
- 5 Lieder nach Gedichten von Marie Luise Kaschnitz for medium voice and piano (1972); words by Marie Luise Kaschnitz
- 4 Lieder nach Gedichten von Nelly Sachs for medium voice and piano (1972); words by Nelly Sachs
- Prediger Salomo (12, 1-9), Solo cantata for low voice, flute and piano or organ (1973)
- Tre Notturni, 3 Gedichte for low male voice, piano and wind quintet (flute, oboe, clarinet, horn, bassoon) (1975); words by Friedrich Nietzsche
- Der Liebe will ich singen, Minnenlieder aus der Zeit der Staufer for soprano, baritone and orchestra or piano (1976)
- 3 Lieder der Ophelia aus Shakespeares Hamlet for soprano and piano (1980); words by William Shakespeare
- Hamlet-Sinfonie in 2 parts for soprano, mezzo-soprano, 2 tenors, 2 baritones, 2 choristers, narrator and orchestra (1982); words by August Wilhelm Schlegel after William Shakespeare
- Hamlets erster und zweiter Monolog for the opera Hamlet for baritone and piano (1982); words by August Wilhelm Schlegel after William Shakespeare

=== Choral ===
- Die Rückkehr des verlorenen Sohnes, chamber oratorio in 5 scenes for soloists, mixed chorus and orchestra, Op. 34 (1929, revised 1952); revision of the opera Der verlorene Sohn; words by André Gide in translation by Rainer Maria Rilke
- Der große Kalender, oratorio for soprano, baritone, mixed chorus, children's chorus, organ and orchestra, Op. 43 (1933, revised 1970)
- Der glückliche Bauer, cantata after songs of Matthias Claudius for mixed or male chorus and orchestra, Op. 44 (revised version 1957); words by Matthias Claudius
- Gesang des Deutschen, cantata for soprano, baritone, mixed chorus and orchestra, Op. 49 (1937); words by Friedrich Hölderlin
- Chorfantasie in 3 movements for soprano, baritone, mixed chorus and orchestra, Op. 52 (1939); words by Johann Wolfgang von Goethe
- Pandora, cantata for soprano, baritone, mixed chorus and orchestra, Op. 72 (1949); words by Johann Wolfgang von Goethe
- Bauernhochzeit. 8 Gedichte zum Singen, Spielen und Tanzen for mixed chorus and orchestra (1950); words from Stimmen der Völker (Voices of the Peoples) by Johann Gottfried Herder
- Sechs Chöre for mixed chorus, wind orchestra, piano, timpani and percussion (1952); words from El Gran Teatro del mundo by Pedro Calderón de la Barca
- Triptychon for tenor, mixed chorus and orchestra (1959); words by Friedrich Schiller
