= Ludwig Strecker Jr. =

German music publisher and libretto author (1883–1978)

Ludwig Strecker
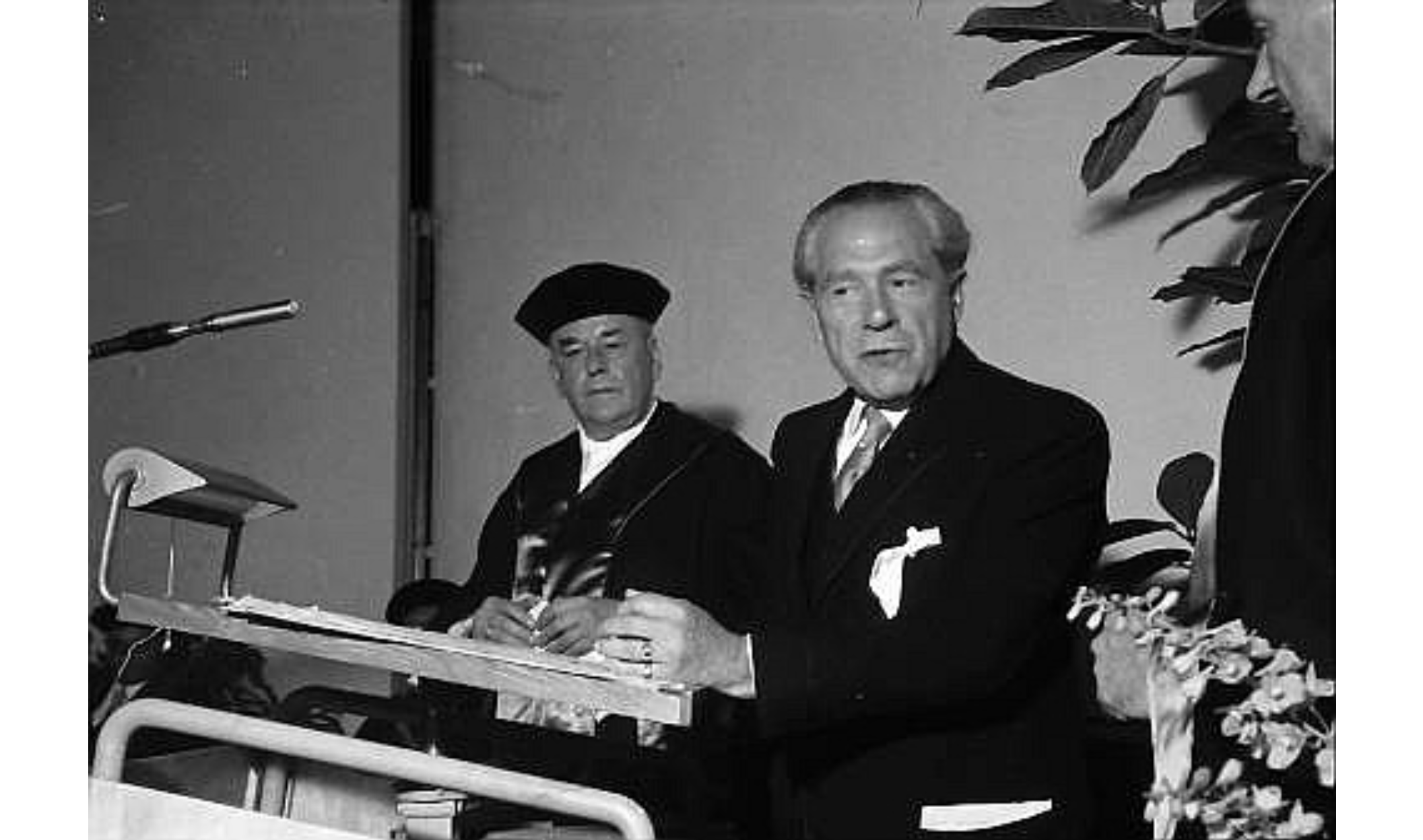
- Strecker (right) in 1957, receiving an honorary doctorate from the University of Freiburg
- Born: Ludwig Emanuel Strecker; 13 January 1883; Mainz, Germany
- Died: 15 September 1978 (aged 95); Wiesbaden, Germany
- Other names: Ludwig Andersen
- Education: Ludwig-Maximilians-Universität München; Friedrich Wilhelm University of Berlin; Leipzig University
- Occupations: Music publisher; Librettist
- Organization: Schott Music
- Awards: Order of Merit of the Federal Republic of Germany

Ludwig Strecker Jr., also Ludwig Strecker der Jüngere, (13 January 1883 – 15 September 1978) was a German music publisher and an author of opera librettos which he wrote under the pen name Ludwig Andersen. He authored, and published through the Schott Music publishing house, two of the most successful German contemporary operas of the 1930s, Egk's Die Zaubergeige and Reutter's Doktor Johannes Faust.

== Life ==
Born Ludwig Emanuel Strecker in Mainz, he was interested in poetry and literature early in life. He studied law at the Ludwig-Maximilians-Universität München, the Friedrich Wilhelm University of Berlin and Leipzig University, where he obtained his doctorate in 1906.

After a stay abroad, Strecker became co-owner of the Schott music publishing house in Mainz in 1909, which his father Ludwig Strecker had inherited from Franz Schott in 1874. Strecker and his brother Wilhelm Strecker became directors in 1920, and opened the publishing house for contemporary composers such as Paul Hindemith and Carl Orff. They took over the management of Schott together when their father died in 1943.

Under the pseudonym Ludwig Andersen, he also worked as a librettist and translator of libretti. Among the libretti he wrote for notable composers of the period, and then published, were Werner Egk's Die Zaubergeige, premiered in 1935 by the Oper Frankfurt, and Hermann Reutter's Doktor Johannes Faust, premiered also in Frankfurt in 1936; the two works were among the most successful German contemporary operas during the Nazi regime, Die Zaubergeige being performed 198 times and Doktor Johannes Faust 116 times in Germany until 1945. This success established Schott as a leading publisher of stage works. Strecker translated Ermanno Wolf-Ferrari's opera Gli dei a Tebe for its world premiere at the Staatsoper Hannover in 1943.

Strecker's first wife was Friedel Preetorius (1884–1938), the daughter of the Mainz entrepreneur and politician Wilhelm Preetorius. Strecker died in Wiesbaden at age 95.

== Awards ==
- 1953: Order of Merit of the Federal Republic of Germany
- 1955: Peter-Cornelius-Plakette of Rhineland-Palatinate
- Honorary senator of the Johannes Gutenberg University Mainz

== Librettos ==
- Der große Kalender. Music: Hermann Reutter. Premiere 1933, revised version 1970 Stuttgart.
- Die Zaubergeige. Music: Werner Egk. Premiere 1935 Oper Frankfurt.
- Doktor Johannes Faust. Music: Reutter. Premiere 1936 Oper Frankfurt, revised version 1955 Stuttgart
- Tobias Wunderlich. Music: Joseph Haas. Premiere 1937 Kassel.
- Die Hochzeit des Jobs. Music: Haas. Premiere 1944 Dresden.
- Der Igel als Bräutigam, based on "Hans My Hedgehog". Music: Cesar Bresgen. Premiere 1948 Esslingen, revised version 1951 Staatstheater Nürnberg.
