= Jacky June =

Belgian jazz musician and band leader (1924–2012)

- Also known as: Jacky June; Jacke Jun
- Born: Jean-Jacques Junne; 3 April 1924; Brussels, Belgium
- Died: 28 September 2012 (aged 88) Braine-l'Alleud, Belgium
- Genres: Big band jazz
- Occupations: Band leader, jazz musician
- Instruments: saxophone, clarinet
- Years active: 1943–2012

Jacky June (a.k.a. Jacke Jun, né Jean-Jacques Junne 3 April 1924 – 28 September 2012) was a Belgian jazz saxophonist, clarinetist, and bandleader.

== Career highlights ==
Jacky June was born in Brussels, Belgium, and began studying piano at the age of six. In 1943, he joined the Henry Van Bemst (born 1916) Orchestra. After World War II, June founded and directed his own jazz orchestra at the Hotel Cosmopolite Bruxelles. He also played with Hot Club de Belgique and the Kot Jazzmen, the latter from which, in the 1950s, his Jump College Orchestra emerged. In 1951, he performed with Roy Eldridge at Jazzclub La Rose Noire. Jazz critics compared June's style to that of Sidney Bechet and Benny Carter, both with whom June recorded, along with René Thomas, Jean Blaton, Peanuts Holland, Don Byas and Léon Demeuldre in 1965, and perhaps in 1967 and 1971. In the 1950s, his Jump College Orchestra fronted Charles Trenet and Marlene Dietrich at the Knokke Casino and Sidney Bechet at the Palais des Beaux-Arts. He died at Braine-l'Alleud, Belgium.

The Kot Jazzmen was founded during the Nazi occupation of Belgium. At that time, a number of Brussels musicians went into hiding and got together in a tiny four-story building on the Rue des Moineaux. The house became famous as Le Kot (the Digs). The group included:

- Léon (Podoum) Demol (1920–1984) (tenor sax)
- Jacky June (woodwinds)
- Léon (Bodash) Demeuldre (born 1925) (drums)
- Herman Sandy (born 1921) (trumpet)
- Jacky Thunis (né Jacques Theunis; 1921–1992) (drums)
- Jean Warland (né Jean Vandenheuvel; 1926–1915) (double bass).

June was the grandson of Otto Junne (1854–1935), music publisher who acquired the publishing firm Schott frères in 1889.

== Selected discography ==
Jam Session, Polyvox Acetate (1943)
Robert Siroul (conductor), Jacky Jun (tenor sax), Pierre Cochard (vibes), Jean Blaton (guitar solo), Francis Lenoir (guitar), Paul Dubois (born 1924) (double bass), unknown (drums), Viviane Gray (vocal)
Recorded in Brussels, 1943

1. "At the Darktown Strutters' Ball"
2. "Dinah"
3. "Out of Nowhere"
4. "I've Found a New Baby"
5. "Don't Be That Way"
6. "Blues"
7. "Refrain sauvage," Vivian Gray (vocal)
8. "Boogie Woogie"
9. "Blues"

The Kot Jazzmen, private recording (1949)
Leo Delannoit (trumpet), Jacky Jun (alto sax), Billy Desmedt (piano), Paul Karthy (guitar), Marc Harrison (double bass), Leon "Bodash" Demeuldre (drums)
Recorded at the Panthéon, Brussels, 1949

1. "Ladies lullaby"
2. "Night Ramble"

Jazz Vivant, The Jump College Orchestra, private recording (on acetate) (1950)
Recorded in Brussels, 6 October 1950
Emile Peiffer (trumpet), Jacky Jun (alto sax), Roger Asselberghs (bari sax), Johnny Hot (born 1932) (piano), Paul Karthy (guitar), Benoît Quersin (double bass), Jean Delange (drums)

1. "Sophisticated Lady"
2. "Red Top"

Jacques Pelzer, private recording (on acetate) (1952)
Jazz Parade (radio broadcast), d’Institut National de Radiodiffusion, Recorded in Brussels, 16 March 1952
Jacques Pelzer (alto sax) except 2; René Thomas (guitar); Hubert Chatelain (piano) on 3 & 4; Nicolas Fissette (trumpet) on 1 & 4; Jacky Jun (alto sax) on 1 & 4; Alex Scorier (tenor sax) except 3; Johnny Hot (born 1932) (piano) on 1 & 4; Jean Blaton (guitar) on 1 & 4; Francis Boland (piano) on 2 & 4; Benoît Quersin (bass) except 3; René Goldstein (bass) on 3 & 4; Jean Carnin (drums) except 3; Jose Bourguignon (drums); Yetti Lee (vocal) on "Lady Bird," Henry Breyre (guitar) on 4; Emile Chantrain (tenor sax) on 4; Francis Coppieters (piano) on 4; Jean Delange (drums) on 4; Leo Delsemme (trombone) on 4; Johnny Dover (bass) on 4; Vicky Down (guitar or banjo) on 4; Paul Dubois (born 1924) (bass) on 4; Mary Kay (vocal) on 4; Christian Kellens (trombone) on 4; Charlie Knegtel (trumpet) on 4

1. "Buzzy" (1)
2. "Pennies from Heaven" (2)
3. "Marionette" (3)
4. "Lady Bird" (3)
5. "How High the Moon" (4)

Jam Session on the Radio, Radio 55 blues Radio Broadcast
Radio 55 Blues (broadcast), d’Institut National de Radiodiffusion, Brussels, April 1955
Peanuts Holland, Henri Carels (trumpets), Albert Nicholas (clarinet), Jacky Jun, Don Byas (tenor sax), Francis Coppieters, Johnny Hot (born 1932) (piano), Rene Gossens, Paul Dubois (born 1924) (double bass), Leon "Bodash" Demeuldre (drums)

Sidney Bechet with The Jump College Band, Air Hot AVG (Belgian record label) (private recording)
Concert at the Centre for Fine Arts, Brussels, 1 April 1951
Herman Sandy (born 1921) (trumpet), Sidney Bechet (soprano sax), Jacke June (alto & tenor sax), Roger Asselberghs (bari sax), Johnny Hot (born 1932) (piano), Paul Karthy (guitar), Paul Dubois (born 1924) (double bass), Jean DeLange (drums)

1. "St. Louis blues"

Jam Session on the Radio
Radio broadcast, d’Institut National de Radiodiffusion, Brussels, April 1955
Peanuts Holland (trumpet), Jacky Jun (tenor saxs), Johnny Hot (born 1932) (piano), Jean Blaton (guitar), Paul Dubois (born 1924) (double bass), Jean Delange (drums)

1. "Lady Be Good"
2. "Basin Street Blues"
3. "Perdido"
4. "St. Louis Blues"

Jam Session on the Radio
Don Byas (tenor sax), Peanuts Holland, Henri Carels (trumpets), Albert Nicholas (clarinet), Jacky Jun (tenor sax), Francis Coppieters, Johnny Hot (born 1932) (piano), Rene Gossens, Paul Dubois (born 1924) (double bass), Leon "Bodash" Demeuldre (drums)
Radio broadcast, d’Institut National de Radiodiffusion, Brussels, April 1955

1. "Lester Leaps In"
2. "The Man I Love"
3. "Tea For Two"
4. "Body and Soul"
5. "How High the Moon"

Jazz Vivant, Leon "Bodash" Demeuldre Quintet, Session 2, private acetate (1955)
Henri Carels (trumpet), Jacky Jun (tenor sax), Jean Fanis, (piano), Nick Kletchkovsky (double bass), Leon "Bodash" Demeuldre (drums)
Recorded in Brussels, 15 April 1955

1. "Denison Swing"
2. "Ellington Medley"

"Sophisticated Lady"
"Prelude to a Kiss"
"Sentimental Mood"

1. "Kansas City Stride"
2. "Rock-a-Bye Basie"
3. "The Sheik of Araby"
4. "Slider"

Fats Sadi with the Jump College Orchestra, Stereo a Gogo, Volume V (Polydor 236209) (1967)
Recorded December 1967, Brussels, Belgium,
Janot Morales, Jules Van Dijck, Emile Peiffer, Jean Van Landen (trumpets), Albert Mertens, Frans Van Dijck, probably Roger Squinquel, Nick Frerar (trombones), Jacky June (soprano sax), Marcel Denies (alto sax, clarinet), André Coel (alto sax, clarinet, flute), Raymond Bonnet, Jean Kesteman (tenor sax, clarinet, flute), Henri Solbach (bari sax, clarinet), Johnny Dell (piano), Johnny Hot (born 1932) (piano, solo), Paul Karthy (guitar), Fats Sadi (vibes, bongos), Paul Dubois (born 1924) (double bass), Freddy Rottier (né Frédéric Rottier; 1926–1995) (drums)

1. "Flamingo"
2. "Bei Dir War Es Immer So Schön"
3. "On the Sunny Side of the Street"
4. "Bonsoir Jolie Madame"
5. "How High the Moon"
6. "Stranger in Paradise"
7. "Winter in Madrid"
8. "Orange Colored Sky"
9. "When the Saints Go Marching In"
10. "The Last Night"
11. "Far Away"

Jump College Orchestra, MediaGolden Evergreens in super stereo (Polydor 2420095) (1971)
Recorded 3 & 6 May 1971, Studio DES, Brussels
Etienne Verschueren (conductor, arranger), Edmond Harnie, Janot Morales, Marcel Debruyne, Jean Van Landen (trumpets), Albert Mertens Frans Van Dijck probably Fons Dirickx, Roger Squinquel(trombones), Marcel Denies, André Coel (alto sax, clarinet), Jacky Jun (soprano sax), Raymond Bonnet, José Paessens (tenor sax, clarinet), Henri Solback (bari sax, clarinet), Johnny Dell (piano), Fats Sadi (vibes, bongos), Jo Van Wetter (guitar), Paul Dubois (born 1924) (double bass), Freddy Rottier (né Frédéric Rottier; 1926–1995) (drums)

1. "Satin Doll"
2. "These Foolish Things"
3. "I've Got You Under My Skin"
4. "Royal Garden Blues"
5. "Laura"
6. "Caravan (1937 song)"
7. "Mack the Knife"
8. "The Man I Love"
9. "Deep Purple"
10. "Nuages"
11. "Mood Indigo"
12. "Take the 'A' Train"

== See also ==
- Jazz in België
