= Hymne an Deutschland =

1950 West German patriotic song

The Hymne an Deutschland (Hymn to Germany) is a patriotic song which the then-president of West Germany, Theodor Heuss, aspired to establish as the new national anthem of Germany. During the early 1950s prior to the adoption of "Deutschlandlied" by West Germany, it acted as a sort of de facto national anthem of the nascent state.

== History ==
Its lyrics were written by Rudolf Alexander Schröder in 1950. Hermann Reutter composed its tune after Carl Orff, whom Heuss wanted to have as composer, had rejected the request and suggested Reutter instead. Heuss' attempts failed, and in 1952 he and Chancellor Adenauer recognized the "Deutschlandlied" as the new national anthem, with only the third stanza being sung on official occasions.

== Text and melody ==
Land des Glaubens, deutsches Land,
Land der Väter und der Erben,
Uns im Leben und im Sterben
Haus und Herberg', Trost und Pfand,
Sei den Toten zum Gedächtnis,
Den Lebend'gen zum Vermächtnis,
Freudig vor der Welt bekannt,
Land des Glaubens, deutsches Land!

Land der Hoffnung, Heimatland,
Ob die Wetter, ob die Wogen
Über dich hinweggezogen,
Ob die Feuer dich verbrannt,
Du hast Hände, die da bauen,
Du hast Herzen, die vertrauen,
Lieb' und Treue halten stand,
Land der Hoffnung, Heimatland!

Land der Liebe, Vaterland,
Heil'ger Grund, auf den sich gründet,
Was in Lieb' und Leid verbündet
Herz mit Herzen, Hand mit Hand.
Frei, wie wir dir angehören
Und uns dir zu eigen schwören,
Schling' um uns dein Friedensband,
Land der Liebe, Vaterland!

Land of faith, German land,
Land of the fathers and their heirs,
For us in life and death
Home and shelter, comfort and pledge,
Be in remembrance of the death,
Heritage for the living,
Glad to be known in the world,
Land of faith, German land!

Land of hope, home country,
Has the weather, have the waves
Swept over you,
Have the fires burnt you,
You have hands that build,
You have hearts that trust,
Love and fidelity withstand,
Land of hope, home country!

Land of love, fatherland,
Holy ground, the foundation,
What unites in love and sorrow,
Heart with heart, hand with hand,
Free as we belong to you,
And swear to be with you,
Wrap around us your ribbon of freedom,
Land of love, fatherland!

== See also ==
- Brecht's Kinderhymne
- Auferstanden aus Ruinen
- Deutschlandlied
- Heil dir im Siegerkranz
- Trizonesien-Song
