= Alain Crépin =

Belgian musician (born 1954)

Alain Crepin
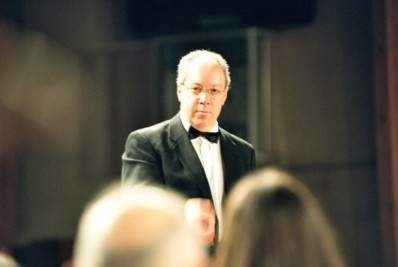
- Alain Crepin conducting in 2006
- Born: 28 February 1954 (age 72); Mettet, Belgium
- Occupation: musician

Alain Crepin (born 28 February 1954) is a Belgian saxophonist, composer, music educator and conductor.

Crepin was born in Mettet near Dinant. He began his studies for saxophone, cello and piano at the Music Academy of Dinant. He studied at the Royal Conservatory of Brussels, and studied under François Daneels, Roland Cardon, Yvon Ducène and Jacques Leduc

From 1975 to 1981 he was solo saxophonist in Musik Corps of the Gendarmerie and from 1981 to 1983 he also worked as a saxophonist in the Large Band of the Belgian Guides in Brussels. In 1984 he became conductor the band Chasseurs Ardennais. In 1985 he became music director of the Band of the Belgian Air Force. He has performed with the saxophone quartet Dinant.

From 1986 to 1997 he was vice president of the International Association for the Promotion of the Saxophone. He was also professor of saxophone at the University of Gap, France and in Alicante, Spain. Since 1981 he has been a professor for saxophone at the Royal Conservatory of Music Brussels.

As a composer, he has written numerous works for symphonic bands and orchestras and as a soloist or composer has featured on over 60 albums.

== Works ==
- 1991 Relâche
- 1991 Temptations
- 2008 Marche de l'Ecole Royal des Sous-Officiers
- 150 ans plus tard (Cercle Royal Musical d'Aubange
- 200th Jubilee march
- Ad Multos Annos
- Air d'automne
- Aircodos
- Atmosphères
- A Tribute to Sax for Alto Saxophone and Band
- Balade en Périgord
- Bayaderie
- Bij ons in Kee Bie
- C.Q.F.D.
- De 3 à 1000
- Diversions
- Emotions
- Enjoy your Life
- Equinoxe
- Falcon and wolf
- Friendship's Hymn
- Fusions Majeures
  1. Prelude & Allegro
  2. Moderato
  3. Maestoso & Allegro
- Gauloiseries
- Greetings from Jersey
  1. Bouley Bay
  2. Rozel Bay
  3. St Hélier
- Hacherade
- Honor and gallantry
- In the Sky of Wincrange
- La Légende de Rolende
- Le Beau levant
- Lean on the ground
- Les cuirassiers
- Marche de l'Eso
- Millénaire 3
- Muziek voor een prinselijke geboorte
- Night before
- Notes en Rag
- Rencontres
- Poire Belle Helene
- Polichinelle
- Proud to serve
- Relache
- Rencontres
- Rhapsody for Berlare
- Running in the Croix-Scaille
- KSOO Saffraanberg
- Sax for two
- Sax in the city
- Saxflight
- Saxs en parallèle
- Silhouette
- Suite Tastevinesque
- Sunray
- Synergies
- Taïaut-Taïaut
- Temptations
- The white Bison
- Towards success
- Up to Quality
