= Zéphyr Records (Brussels) =

- Parent company: Schott frères, s.p.r.l.
- Founded: 1978
- Status: Ceased 1986
- Genre: Classical
- Country of origin: Belgium
- Location: 26-28 Rue Ravenstein, and 30 Rue Saint-Jean; Brussels

Zéphyr (Producteur phonographique) was a Belgian independent classical record label founded and owned by Schott frères, s.p.r.l. (Schott Brothers, private limited liability company), a Belgian music publishing and distributing firm. Zéphyr was based in the Brussels office of Schott frères. Schott frères had founded Zéphyr in 1978 for the purpose of showcasing instrumental works of Belgium composers, many of whom in its sheet music catalog. Since the 1960s, Schott Music had been distributing otherwise neglected recordings from catalogs of other small multinational European labels such as Harmonia Mundi, which specializes in baroque music, and WERGO, which produces contemporary music.

== Recording venues ==
- Klankstudio Steurbaut, Ghent, owned by Gilbert Steurbaut
- Cavaillé-Coll organ, Chapel, Sacred Heart Institute, Jette, Brussels
- Van Bever organ at the St. Peterskerk, Jette, Brussels

== Selected composers recorded ==
- Joseph Jongen
- Albert Dupuis
- Marcel Poot
- Flor Peeters
- Fernand Quinet
- Jean Absil
- René Defossez
- Albert Huybrechts
- Jacques Leduc (in French)
- Frederik van Rossum (in French)

== Selected discography ==
=== Z series ===
Catalog	Album title	Artist	Released	Library code
Z-03	Organ Music of Kerckhoven	Jozef Sluys		LCCN 90-750483
Z-04	Organ Music of Lemmens	Jozef Sluys	1979	OCLC 7711799
Z-05	Two Centuries of Spanish Music for Two Guitars	Ilse & Nicolas Alfonso	1980	OCLC 761818608, 658681302
Z-06	Organ Music Liège	Jozef Sluys		LCCN 89-753309
Z-07	Sax-Retro	François Daneels		OCLC 34365360
Z-08	Saxo-rama	Elie Apper		LCCN 88-752035
Z-09	Organ Works of Georg Böhm	Jozef Sluys		OCLC 20855709
Z-10	Organ Works of Georg Böhm	Jozef Sluys		OCLC 20855709
Z-11	Organ Works of Georg Böhm	Jozef Sluys		OCLC 20855709
Z-12	The Romantic Guitar in 18th Century Spain	Gonzalez Mohino	1982	OCLC 757281208
Z-13	Three quartets for clarinet, violin, viola, & cello	Ensemble Contrasts		LCCN 90-751559
Z-14	Goethe Songs	Josef Baert, baritone	1982	LCCN 89-753935
Z-16	Lamentationes Jeremiae prophetae	Greta de Reyghere	1982	LCCN 89-754281
Z-17	Suites from 3rd Organ Book, Nivers	Jozef Sluys	1982	LCCN 87-752949
Z-18	Four Quartets for Clarinet	Belgium Clarinet Quartet	1982	OCLC 220341642
Z-19	Birds: German & French melodies of Mozart & Ravel	Greta de Reyghere	1983	LCCN 89-751493
Z-20	Saxophone & Organ	Jean-Pierre Rorive		LCCN 89-753664
Z-23	Saxophone Concert	François Daneels		OCLC 16715188
Z-24	Guitar Duo	Mirel & Michael Burton		OCLC 762738944

== Other labels named Zephyr ==
- Zephyr Records of Hollywood, California, founded in 1956 by George Albert Hormel II (aka Geordie Hormel; 1929–2006), jazz pianist and grandson of the founder of Hormel Foods
- Zephyr Records, a small classical label founded in 1997, based in Fort Worth, Texas, and wholly owned by Zephyr Productions Inc., both founded by in 1997 by classical pianist Ian Hobson
- Zephyr Records of Casper, Wyoming, founded in the 1990s by American roots singer Spencer Bohren
