= Gli dei a Tebe =

Opera by Ermanno Wolf-Ferrari

Gli dei a Tebe (The gods in Thebes) is an opera in three acts by Ermanno Wolf-Ferrari on a libretto by Mario Ghisalberti, performed for the first time at the Opernhaus in Hannover on 4 June 1943. The first performance used the translation of the libretto in German (Der Kuckuck in Theben) by Franz Rau. Ghisalberti had in turn derived the libretto from a work by the publisher Ludwig Strecker, who wrote librettos under the pseudonym Ludwig Andersen.

After the performances in Hanover the opera was again performed in Stettin in September 1943, in Fribourg in February 1948, in Trier in May 1948. More recently there are reports of performances in Munich in 1964 and Berlin in 1965 and 1966.

== Synopsis ==
The story, set in ancient Thebes, focuses on Zeus' attempt to take the place of Amphitryon, returning from a war, to have an adventure with his wife Alcmene. The attempt fails because of the intervention of Zeus' wife, Hera, who understood her husband's intentions.

The cuckoo in the title of the German translation refers to a bird that Alcmene would like to give as an offering to Hera. The goddess tells Alcmene not to consummate the night with Amphytrion when he returns, until the cuckoo has sung. In this way Zeus, who has presented himself to Alcmene in the guise of Amphitryon, is forced, together with Alcmene, to wait for the morning in the temple near the altar of Hera. In the morning Hera makes sure that Alcmene meets the real Amphytrion and Zeus' project fades away.
