= John Giordano (conductor) =

American orchestra conductor

John Read Giordano (born December 31, 1937) is an American orchestra conductor, professor of music, composer, and former concert saxophonist.

Giordano studied at the University of California and the Eastman School of Music. While studying at the Brussels Conservatory, he studied saxophone with Francois Daneels, who was recognized as one of Europe's leading saxophone virtuosos.

== Published work & academic appointments ==
- Fantasy, for Alto Saxophone and Piano, Southern Music Co., San Antonio (c1969)
- March 1966 — While a grad student at the University of North Texas College of Music, Giordano was appointed Assistant Conductor of the Fort Worth Youth Symphony when it was formed.
- April 13, 1966 — Giordano premiered a composition for saxophone wind ensemble, performed by the Dallas Symphony. He composed the work through his involvement with the Composer-Performer Workshop at the University of North Texas. Another one of his compositions, built a 12-tone theme, was simply read by the orchestra during rehearsal.
- July 11, 1966 — The University of North Texas regents approved the appointment of Giordano to teach in the College of Music as Artist in Residence. Giordano served at the University of North Texas until 1973, when, a year earlier, he was appointed conductor of the Fort Worth Symphony.

== Saxophonist ==
Early in his career, one of his notable saxophone performances was in London with the BBC Symphony Chamber Orchestra performing Jacques Ibert's Concertino da Camera under the direction of Francis Chagrin on May 12, 1971. In December 1971, Giordano toured France and Belgium, performing concert saxophone on Flemish and French radio and television and in the cities of Tubize, Dinant, Brussels, Enghien, Antwerp, Paris, Givet, and Marcinelle.
