= Rudolf Alexander Schröder =

German translator and poet (1878–1962)

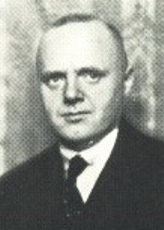
- Rudolf Alexander Schröder photographed by Nicola Perscheid circa 1924
- Born: 26 January 1878; Bremen
- Died: 22 August 1962 (aged 84); Bad Wiessee
- Occupations: Poet, translator, painter, writer, architect, hymnwriter, librettist

Signature
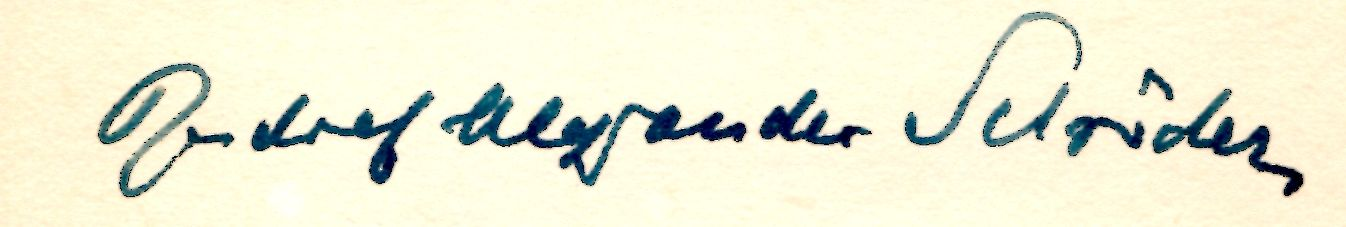

Rudolf Alexander Schröder (26 January 1878 – 22 August 1962) was a German translator and poet. In 1962 he was awarded the Johann-Heinrich-Voß-Preis für Übersetzung. He was nominated for the Nobel Prize in Literature five times.

== Career ==
Much of his work is Christian poetry. He was a member of the Confessing Church which resisted Nazi Germany. Furthermore, Schröder wrote the poem "Hymne an Deutschland" which the then president of the Federal Republic of Germany, Theodor Heuss, wanted to establish as new national anthem.
