= Hot Club of Belgium =

Belgian jazz club

The Hot Club of Belgium (Hot Club de Belgique; abbreviated as HCB) was a Belgian club for jazz fans founded on April 1, 1939, by Willy De Cort (1914–2004), Albert Bettonville (1916–2000), Carlos de Radzitzky (fr) (1915–1985), and others. De Cort was an impresario; Bettonville was a music journalist; and de Radzitzky was a poet, journalist, and music critic. The club disbanded in the mid-1960s.

== Selected activities ==
Concerts, conferences, and film

The organization held concerts, often at the Théâtre royal des Galeries (fr) and the Palais des Beaux-Arts. HCB also held conferences and monthly matinees film screenings related to jazz, and later rock and roll.

Jazz competitions

The Hot Club of Belgium organized an international jazz competition. In 1947, Belgian jazz clarinetist and saxophonist Johnny Dover (de) (1929–2002) formed his first jazz group to participate in the competition and won the award of best clarinet player that year.

== Publications ==
The Hot Club of Belgium published two magazines:

- Jazz, which ran from March to November 1945, Issues 1 through 13
- Hot Club Magazine: revue illustrée de la musique de jazz a monthly, which from January 1946 to August 1948, Issues 1 through 29.

Carlos de Radzitzky (fr) (1915–1985) was editor-in-chief of Hot Club Magazine. Beginning November 1948, the publication was absorbed and appeared as a two-page insert in the Paris publication Jazz Hot until October 1956.

== See also ==
- Jazz in Belgium
