= William P. Latham =

American composer

An image of Latham

William Peters Latham, Sr. (4 January 1917 in Shreveport, Louisiana – 24 February 2004 in Denton, Texas) was an American composer and music educator.

== Teaching career ==
Latham was educated in Kentucky, Ohio, and New York, completing degrees in composition and theory at the University of Cincinnati College-Conservatory of Music. Later, he was awarded a Ph.D. in composition at the Eastman School of Music of the University of Rochester in Rochester, New York (1951). His principal composition teachers were Sir Eugene Aynsley Goossens and Howard Hanson.

Latham taught theory and composition at the University of Northern Iowa from 1946 to 1965, attaining the rank of professor of music in 1959. In 1965 he joined the faculty of the University of North Texas College of Music as professor of music and coordinator of composition. He was appointed director of graduate studies in music in 1969. In 1978 he was promoted to the rank of distinguished professor of music, the university's highest rank. Only seven other faculty members of the university had been so honored at that time. He retired from active service at UNT in June, 1984, and he was formally designated professor emeritus by the board of regents in November, 1984.

== Compositions ==
Latham composed 118 works; 62 have been published, 56 remain in manuscript, but all have been performed, many throughout the United States, Canada, Europe, and Japan. He received numerous awards and commissions (29). His orchestral works have been performed by the Cincinnati Symphony Orchestra, the Eastman-Rochester Philharmonic, the Dallas Symphony Orchestra, the Saint Louis Symphony Orchestra, and Radio Orchestras in Brussels, Belgium and Hilversum, Holland, under such well known conductors as Eugene Goossens, Howard Hanson, Thor Johnson, Anshel Brusilow, John Giordano, and Walter Susskind.

== Death ==
Latham died in Denton, Texas, on February 24, 2004.
