= Théo Ysaÿe =

Belgian composer and pianist

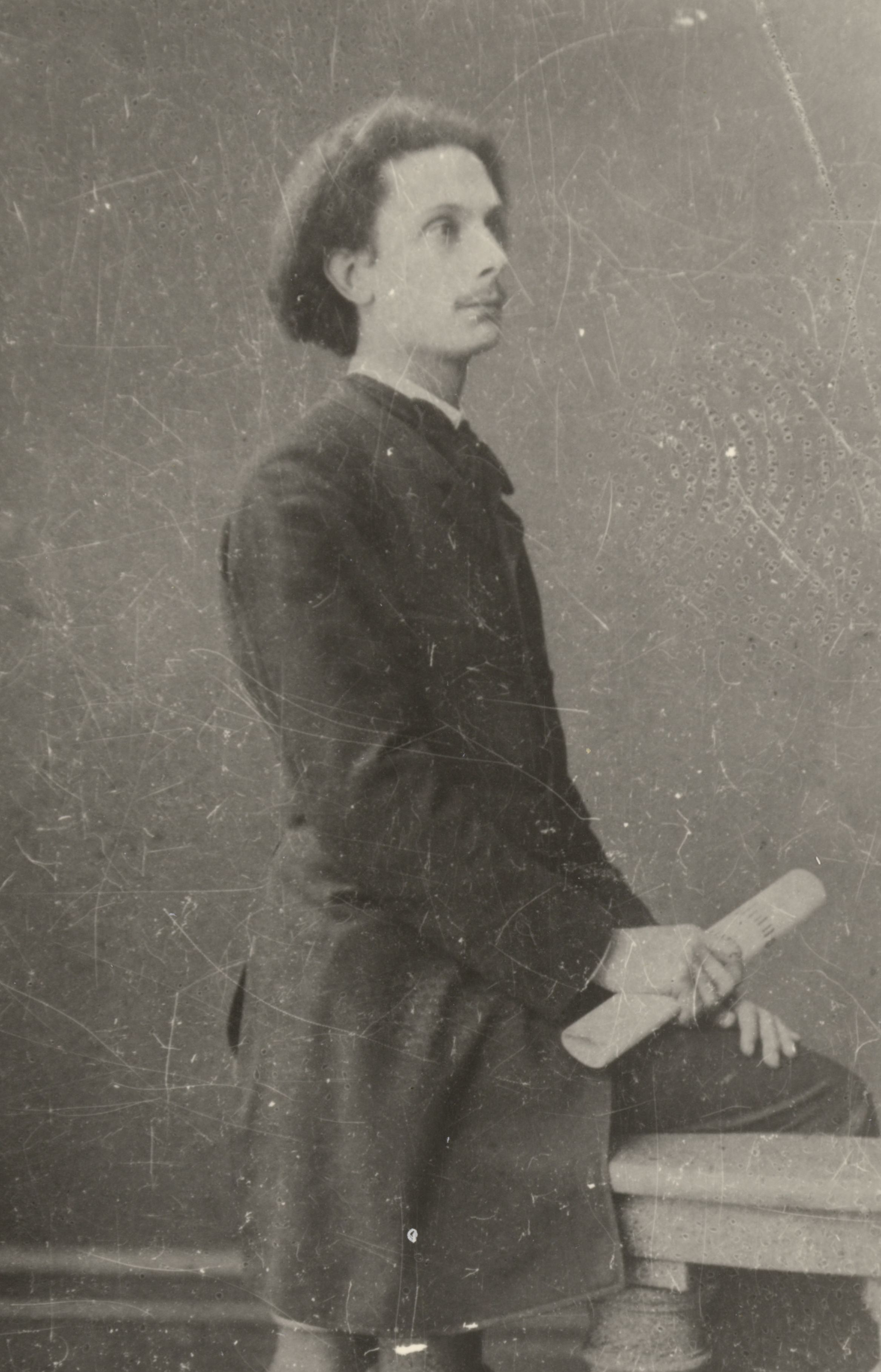
Théo Ysaÿe

Théophile Ysaÿe (French: [te.ofil iza.i]; 2 March 1865 – 24 March 1918) was a Belgian composer and pianist, born in Verviers, Belgium. His brother was the violinist and conductor Eugène Ysaÿe.

== Biography ==
Rather overshadowed throughout his life by the career of his elder brother Eugène, Théo Ysaÿe began amateur studies in music at the Liège Conservatory and, on Eugène's advice, furthered his education in Berlin. In 1885, Ysaÿe returned to Paris, where he joined the Bande à Franck but also supported the growth of a new aesthetic movement represented by the impressionism of Claude Debussy. Ysaÿe helped promote the work of the new school of French musicians, in Brussels. In 1894, he and his brother found engagements with the La Libre Esthétique in Brussels, which offered the residents of the city the opportunity to experience a generous range of displays in both music and the plastic arts. Ysaÿe contributed his talents as a pianist and a répétiteur.

Although Ysaÿe was an excellent pianist, his fragile health did not allow him to follow the hectic pace of his brother's career and he instead became a professor at the Genève Conservatory of Music.

In 1918, Théo Ysaÿe died in Nice, France, two days before Debussy. His relatively vast oeuvre has not been published in its entirety, let alone performed as such. His opus 13, 14 and 15 were published by G. Schirmer in New York. He wrote symphonies, piano concertos, symphonic poems, and chamber music, principally, as well as a requiem. While he inherited initially the style of César Franck, his later work revealed a clear influence of impressionism.

== Selected works ==
=== Orchestral ===
- Piano Concerto in E flat major, op. 9 (publ. 1907)
- "Fantaisie sur un thème populaire wallon" pour grand orchestre, op. 13 (publ. 1907)
- Symphony No. 1, op. 14 (publ. 1908)
- Le Cygne (The Swan), op. 15 (publ. 1907)
- Les Abeilles (The Bees), op. 17
- La Forêt et l'Oiseau (The Forest and the Bird), op. 18
- Symphony No. 2, incomplete

=== Chamber ===
- Piano Quintet, op. 5
- Variations for 2 pianos, op. 10

=== Choral ===
- Requiem (1906)

=== Piano ===
- Nocturne pour piano in A minor
