= Schott frères =

- Company type: Subsidiary (1823–1889); Independent (1889–2006)
- Industry: Music publishing
- Founded: 1823
- Founder: Johann Andreas Schott; Johann Josef Schott
- Defunct: 2006 (Acquired by Schott Music)
- Headquarters: Antwerp (1823–1839); Brussels (1839–2006), Belgium
- Area served: Worldwide
- Key people: Peter Bernhard Schott; Pierre Schott; Otto Junne; Jean-Jacques Junne (Jacky June)
- Products: Sheet music

Schott frères was a Belgian sheet music publishing house that operated between 1823 and 2006.

== History ==
The company was founded in 1823 in Antwerp as the Belgian branch of B. Schott's Söhne (today: Schott Music). It was established by two of Bernhard Schott's four children, Johann Andreas Schott (1781–1840) and Johann Josef Schott (1782–1855). Peter Bernhard Schott (1821–1873), Johann Andreas' son, became managing director and moved it the company to Brussels around 1839.

Schott frères was one of several European music publishing firms bearing the name Schott, all of which were originally subsidiaries of B. Schott's Söhne, including locations in Paris (1826–9, 1861–92), London (from 1835), and Sydney (1885–9). Of these, only Schott frères operated independently from the German parent company from 1889 to 2006. However, they always had their own publishing programmes, operating with a large degree of commercial independence, and ensuring the distribution of works from the other locations.

Peter ("Pierre") Schott (1857–1894) inherited the publishing business of Brussels and Paris while a minor. On 5 April 1879, two granddaughters of Bernhard Schott who had been managing the Brussels and Paris houses, created the brand name "Schott frères". On 11 November 1886, the granddaughters appointed Peter Schott as sole director; On 30 September 1888, Schott frères was liquidated, with Peter Schott serving as liquidator. In 1889, he conveyed the exclusive rights of Schott frères to Otto Junne (1854–1935), a non-family managing partner. The Paris house published under the name "Éditions Schott". Jean-Jacques Junne (1924–2012), Otto's grandson, had been managing director. He was a jazz saxophonist and band leader known as Jacky June.

In 2006, Schott frères was re-acquired by Schott and absorbed into the Schott Music Group. The shop had been domiciled at Ravensteinstraat and was subsequently closed.

== Selected plate numbers of music published by Schott frères ==
Plate	Composer	Work (public domain)	Year
A.G. 29	Guilmant	Symphony No. 1, Op. 42	1879
S.F. 532	Benoit	"Laura"	1858
S.F. 638	Benoit	"Petits bouquets"	1859
S.F. 639	Benoit	"Revenez petits oiseaux"	1859
S.F. 820	Benoit	"La trace de test pas"	1861
S.F. 821	Benoit	"Ici je veux rêver"	1861
S.F. 1579-1583	Battmann	"Bibliothèque religieuse complète, Op.330-341	1873
S.F. 2021	Gobbaerts	"Souvenir du Camp," Op.49	1879
S.F. 2202	Benoît	"Ave Maria" in F major	1892
S.F. 3521	Wieniawski	Piano Trio, Op. 40	1885
S.F. 3590	Wieniawski	Fantasia for 2 Pianos, Op. 42	1886
S.F. 3601 (1)	Fernand Le Borne	Scènes de Ballet, Op. 9	1886
S.F. 3692	Servais	Concerto in A minor, Op. posthumous	1887
S.F. 3988	Hartog, Eduard de	Ein Mährchen. Charakterskizze f. Orch., Op. 62	1889
S.F. 4169	Gustav Hille, Gustav	Violin Concerto No. 3, Op. 60	1892
S.F. 4320	Accolay	Violin Concerto No. 2 in D minor	1895
S.F. 4594	Rasse, François	Piano Trio, Op. 16	1898
S.F. 4760	Reuss, Prince Heinrich	String Sextet No. 1, Op. 12	1899
S.F. 4859	Closson	"Nocturne" (flute)	1901
S.F. 4981ª	Holmès	Ton nom	1890
S.F. 5106	Azevedo e Silva	Piano Quintet	1905
S.F. 5271-2	Callaerts	2 Sonates pour Orgue	1908
S.F. 5594	Ysaÿe	Divertimento, Op. 24	1921
S.F. 5595	Ysaÿe	Au Rouet, Op. 13	1921
S.F. 5596	Ysaÿe	Extase, Op. 21	1921
S.F. 5603	Ysaÿe	Variations for 2 Pianos, Op. 10	1917
S.F. 6760	Benoit	Contes et Ballades, Op.34	
S.F. 8641	Mozart	Fantasia No. 3, K. 397	

== Influence on Belgian music ==
Schott frères and its Brussels predecessor, B. Schott's Söhne, played a critical role in defining a Belgian identity in music – a blend of Flemish and Belgian-French, both connected to the pure French school. Compositions were produced for chamber music, orchestras, military bands, Belgian royalty, churches, and music pedagogy, namely the Royal Conservatory of Brussels.

=== Selected compositions (by instrument) ===
Saxophone
Plate	Composer	Work (public domain)	Year	Library ID
S.F. 9395	Daneels	"Four Miniatures" (for saxophone)	1982	OCLC 421387160, 17466894
	Daneels	"14 Etudes for Saxophone"	1973	OCLC 29246925
	Poot	"Ballade: for saxophone & piano"	1948	OCLC 494125394

Organ
Plate	Composer	Work (public domain)	Year	Library ID
	Tournemire	"Symphony Chorale for Organ," Op. 69	1939	OCLC 4387063
	Peeters	"Anthologia Pro Organo"	1949	OCLC 66012848

Piano & voice
Plate	Composer	Work (public domain)	Year	Library ID
	Alain	"15 negro spirituals"	1967	OCLC 31371641

Cello
Plate	Composer	Work (public domain)	Year	Library ID
S.F. 9145	Ysaÿe	"Sonata for Cello Solo"	1964	OCLC 223237012

== Related links ==
- Le guide musical, classical music periodical founded in 1855 by what then was the Brussels branch of B. Schott's Söhne
- Zéphyr Records (1978–1986), classical record label of Schott frères
- Jacky June (1924–2012), Otto Junne's grandson, a Belgian jazz pioneer, who served as director of Schott frères
