= Le Guide musical =

Le Guide musical (English: The Music Guide) was a weekly French-language Belgian and French classical music periodical founded 1 March 1855 in Brussels by Peter Bernhard Schott (1821–1873), of the Brussels music publishing house Schott frères (Schott brothers).

== Editors and history ==
Maurice Kufferath (1852–1919) was editor from 1887 to 1891. In 1889, the editorial office relocated to Paris and began publishing from both Paris and Brussels. In 1892, Otto Junne, director of Schott frères, sold the periodical to Kufferath, the editor. From 1894 to 1905, Hugues Imbert (1842–1905) became editor-in-chief, then Henri de Curzon (1861–1942). Kufferath preserved the publication's Franco-Belgian character. The periodical ceased publication in 1918.
