= Die Zaubergeige =

1935 opera by Werner Egk

- Opera by Werner Egk
- Translation: The magic violin
- Librettist: Ludwig Strecker Jr.
- Language: German
- Premiere: 22 May 1935; Frankfurt Opera

Die Zaubergeige is a 1935 opera by Werner Egk to a libretto by Ludwig Strecker after Count Franz Pocci. Egk revised the opera in 1954.

== Recordings ==
- Die Zaubergeige (excerpts): Marcel Cordes, Erika Köth, Elisabeth Lindermeier, Gottlob Frick, Richard Holm, Choir & Orchestra of the Bayerisches Staatsoper, Werner Egk
