= Pierre Max Dubois =

French composer (1930–1995)

Pierre Max Dubois, or Pierre-Max Dubois (1 March 1930 – 29 August 1995) was a French composer of classical music, conductor, and music educator. He was a student of Darius Milhaud, and though not widely popular, was respected. He brought the ideas of Les Six, of which his instructor was a member, into the mid-1900s. This group called for a fresh artistic perspective on music. The music of Dubois is characteristically light hearted with interesting harmonic and melodic textures.

== Life and career ==
Born in Graulhet in the Tarn department of Southern France, Dubois studied at the Paris Conservatoire from 1949 through 1953 where he was a pupil of Jean Doyen (piano) and Darius Milhaud (composition). His first professional commission, Suite humouristique (a piece for French radio), happened while he was a student at the age of 19.

He was awarded the Prix de Rome in 1955 for the cantata Le rire de Gargantua. Most of his works are for woodwinds, especially for saxophone. His Quartet for Saxophones in F premiered in 1962. Another of his works is the Pieces characteristiques en forme de suite, written for alto saxophone with piano accompaniment. In 1964 he was awarded the Grand Prix of the city of Paris for his string ensemble piece Symphonie-sérénade. That same year he began working as a conductor; and in that capacity toured Belgium, Canada, France, and the United States.

While primarily a composer of instrumental pieces, Dubois also composed music for the stage. These include the ballets Impressiones foraines (1951), Le docteur Ox (composed 1961; premiered by the Lyon Opéra Ballet in 1965), and Hommage à Hoffnung (composed 1980, premiered at the Grand Théâtre de Bordeaux in 1981); and the operas Comment causer (composed 1970; premiered at the Opéra Royal de Wallonie in 1971), Les Suisses (composed 1972, premiered at the Opéra Royal de Wallonie in 1973), and Le ruban merveilleux (composed in 1990, premiered at the Forum des Halles in Paris on 31 May 1991).

Dubois was a professor of analysis at the Paris Conservatoire. He died in Rocquencourt in the Île-de-France region of North Central France on 29 August 1995.

== Selected compositions ==
Titles and dates taken from Gérard Billaudot Éditeur.

Piano

- Impressions foraines (1963), arranged for two pianos in 1965
- "Chutt", for four pianos (1965)
- Histoires de piano (1978)
- La maison d'à côté (1979)
- Voulez-vous jouer au cirque? (1983)
- Bébé rose, for piano four-hands (1984)
- Sonate (1985)
- Dix préludes (1992)

Harpsichord

- Partita pour Clavecin ou Piano (1963) / Prelude – Pavane – Toccata

Flute

- Classiquement vôtre, for flute and guitar (1973)
- Tic-Tac, for flute and piano (1975)
- Ensuite?, for flute and piano (1981)
- Histoires de flûte, for flute and piano (1984)

Recorder

- A l'ancienne, for soprano recorder and harpsichord (1981)
- Turlututu, for beginning soprano recorder and guitar or piano (1981)
- Les tricoteuses, perpetual motion for soprano and alto recorder and keyboard (1982)

Oboe

- Histoires de hautbois, for oboe and piano (1985)
- Hommage à un ami, for oboe and piano (1985)

Clarinet

- 18 duos progressifs, for two clarinets
- Voltage, suite for bass clarinet solo

Bassoon

- Histoires de basson (1976), Volumes 1 and 2 for 3 bassoons, Volume 3 for 4 bassoons
- Aria et ruade (1980), for bassoon and piano
- Mélopée (1980), for bassoon and piano
- 3 nouvelles brèves (1980), for bassoon and piano
- Sonatine-tango (1983), for bassoon and piano

Saxophone

- Sonate-fantaisie, Duo concertant (1979)
- 2 Mini Romances, for alto or tenor sax and piano (1979)
- Prélude et rengaine, for alto or tenor sax and piano (1979)
- Vieille chanson et rondinade, for tenor sax and piano (1980)
- Olga-valse, for alto sax and piano (1980)
- Respirations, for alto sax and piano (1980)
- Métamorphoses, symphony for soprano, alto, tenor and baritone sax (1981)
- Moments musicaux, for alto sax and instrumental ensemble, with version for alto sax and piano (1985)
- L'imprévu, for sax quartet (1986)
- 3 petites sonates A «Scarlatti», for sax quartet (1989)
- Come back, for alto sax and piano (1992)
- Dix préludes imaginaires, for sax quartet and orchestra (1992)
- Le récit du chamelier, for alto sax (1992)
- Mominettes, for alto sax (1993)
- 16 études brillantes, for all the saxophones (1993)
- 16 études techniques, contemporary studies (1993)
- 17 études dansantes, for all the saxophones (1993)
- 48 études faciles et progressives, for all the saxophones (1993)
- 16 études de virtuosité, for all the saxophones (1994)
- 20 études progressives en forme de duos, contemporary studies (1994)
- 24 études caprices, for all the saxophones (1994)
- 12 études modernes, for all the saxophones (1995)
- 16 études variées, for all the saxophones (1995)
- Bouquet d'hommages, for alto sax and piano (1995)
- La gremellite, for alto sax and piano (1995)
- Deuxième concerto, for alto sax and orchestra, with version for alto sax and piano (1995)
- Lucienne et Cécilienne, for saxophone orchestra (1990)

Trombone

- Cortége, for trombone and piano (1959)

Double Bass

- Le Gai Cascadeur, for double bass and piano (1973)
- Histories de Contrabasse, for double bass and piano (1988)

Wind Sextet

- Sinfonia da Camera, for flute, oboe, clarinet, alto saxophone, bassoon, and horn (1965)
