= Schott Music =

German music publisher

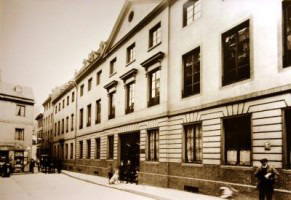
- Founded: 1770
- Founder: Bernhard Schott
- Country of origin: Germany
- Headquarters location: Mainz
- Key people: Peter Hanser-Strecker (1942–2026)
- Publication types: sheet music, albums, magazines
- Imprints: Panton, Ars-Viva, Ernst Eulenburg, Fürstner, Cranz, Atlantis Musikbuch, Hohner-Verlag
- Official website: www.schott-music.com/en/

Schott Music (German: [ʃɔt]) is one of the oldest German music publishers. It is also one of the largest music publishing houses in Europe, and is the second-oldest music publisher in the world that is still active, after Breitkopf & Härtel. The company headquarters of Schott Music were founded by Bernhard Schott in Mainz in 1770.

It represents many composers of the 20th and 21st centuries, and its publishing catalogue contains some 31,000 titles on sale and over 10,000 titles on hire. The repertoire ranges from complete editions, stage and concert works, to general educational literature, fine sheet music editions and multimedia products. In addition to the publishing houses of Panton, Ars-Viva, Ernst Eulenburg, Fürstner, Cranz, Atlantis Musikbuch and Hohner-Verlag, the Schott group also includes two recording labels, Wergo (for new music) and Intuition (for Jazz), as well as eight specialist magazines.

The Schott Music group also includes the printing and production services company WEGA, as well as mds (music distributors services GmbH), the largest music product distribution organisation in Europe providing the distribution of sheet music, books, magazines, audio and audio-visual recordings, and hire materials of both the Schott catalogues and the catalogues of 60 other music publishers.

Representing composers and authors from all over the world, Schott Music has offices in ten countries with some 270 employees principally in Mainz, London, New York and Tokyo, with additional offices in Beijing, Madrid, Paris and Toronto.

== History ==
=== Early years ===
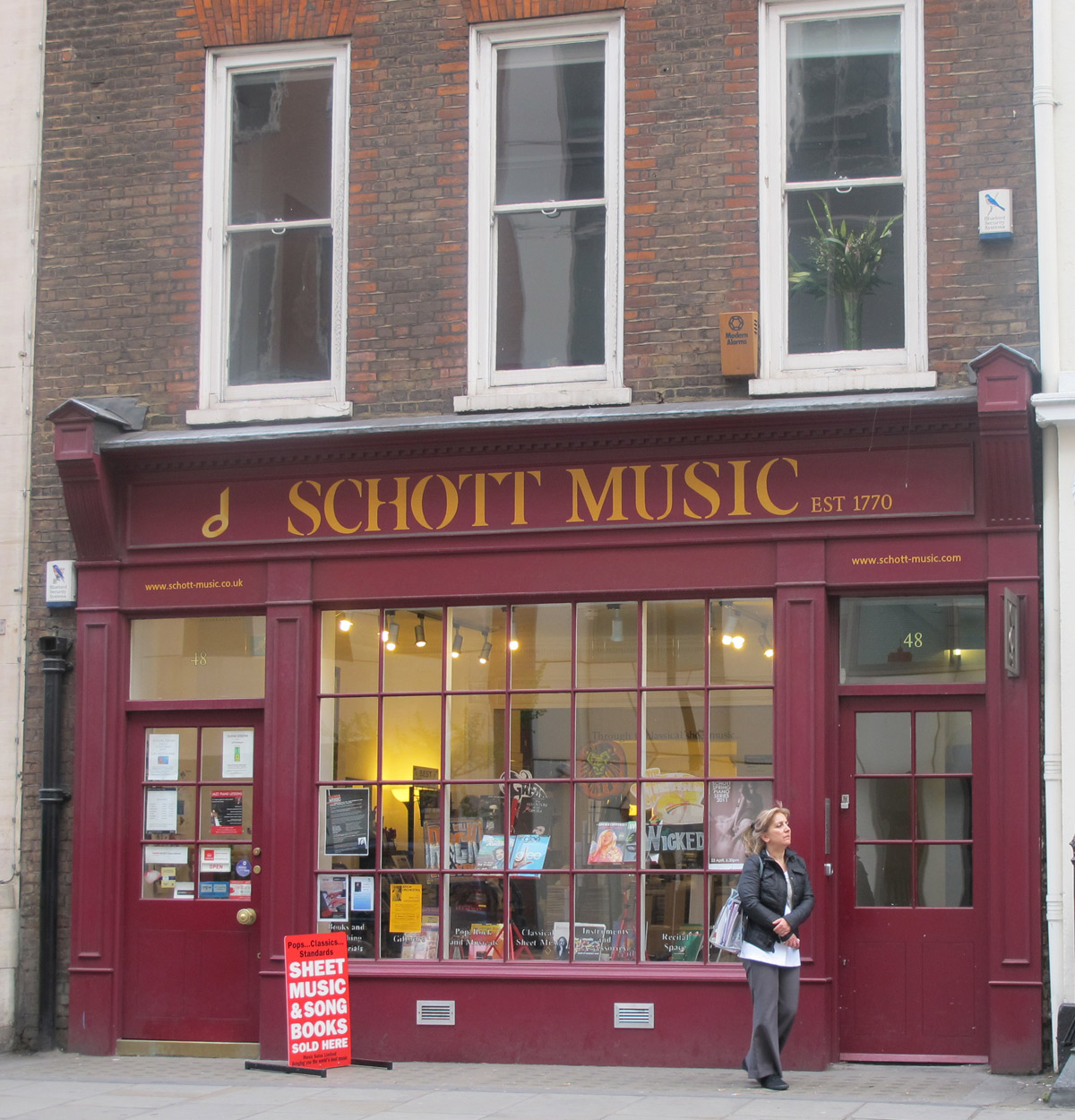
Schott Music store in London

The Schott publishing house was founded by Bernhard Schott (1748–1809) in Mainz in 1770, the year of Beethoven's birth. The historic building is still the company's head office. At the time of the foundation of the publishing house, Mainz boasted a flourishing cultural life and a busy court chapel. In 1780, Bernhard Schott was awarded the privilegium exclusivum together with the title of court music engraver. This meant that within the boundaries of the electorate of Mainz no third party was allowed to re-engrave or sell the works produced by him. Schott was one of the first publishers to use the printing technique of lithography, which meant that his editions were soon being printed and distributed on a wide scale.

During the French years of Mainz, the publisher was heavily taxed, but the affectation to French music helped him at this stage. As a later consequence, the publishing house rapidly became established beyond the national borders of Germany. As early as 1823, Schott founded a branch in Antwerp, relocated to Brussels in 1839 (called Schott frères from 1879 onward), and further offices in musical centres such as Leipzig, London, Paris and Vienna. From the beginning, the house was committed to contemporary music. The publishing program included works by composers from the Mannheim School such as Carl Stamitz and Georg Joseph Vogler, as well as virtuoso ballroom music and comic operas. The publication of the piano scores and first editions of Mozart's Don Giovanni and Die Entführung aus dem Serail were among the highlights of its early history. They were followed by major late works by Ludwig van Beethoven, including the Ninth Symphony, the Missa solemnis and the last two string quartets.

=== Wagner years ===
In the first decades, Schott felt committed to the French tradition popular at that time. The catalogue therefore included names such as Adolphe Adam and Daniel Auber as well as Gaetano Donizetti, Ignaz Pleyel, Augustine Renaud d`Allen, Elise Rondonneau, H. Servier, and Gioacchino Rossini. With the works of Franz Liszt and Peter Cornelius, Schott indicated a stronger interest in the German repertoire. In 1859 Franz Schott (1811–1874), the grandson of Bernhard Schott, succeeded in winning the exclusive collaboration of Richard Wagner, and Schott published Die Meistersinger von Nürnberg, the complete Ring des Nibelungen and Parsifal. The connection with Wagner proved extremely expensive for the publishing house: on 21 October 1862, Franz Schott wrote to Wagner: "Anyway, no music publisher can possibly satisfy your needs, this can only be done by an enormously rich banker or a prince who has got millions ..." Wagner did indeed find his generous prince in the person of Ludwig II, the young King of Bavaria. Wagner wrote a short piano piece dedicated a member of the Schott family: Albumblatt für Frau Betty Schott, WWV 108.

=== Modern classics ===
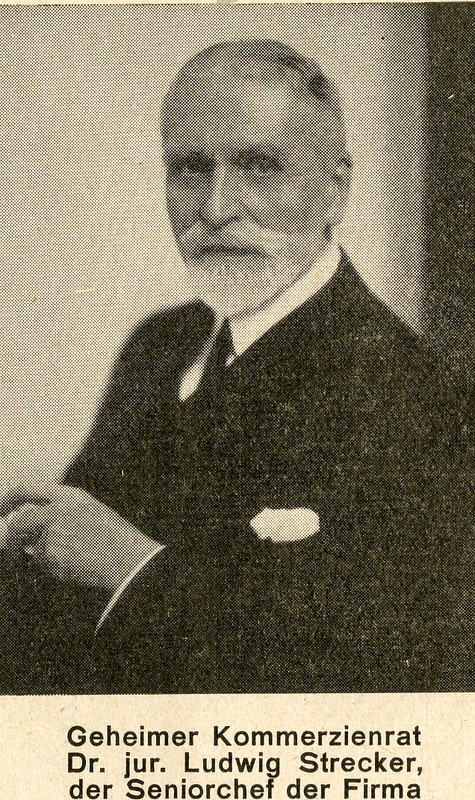
Ludwig Strecker

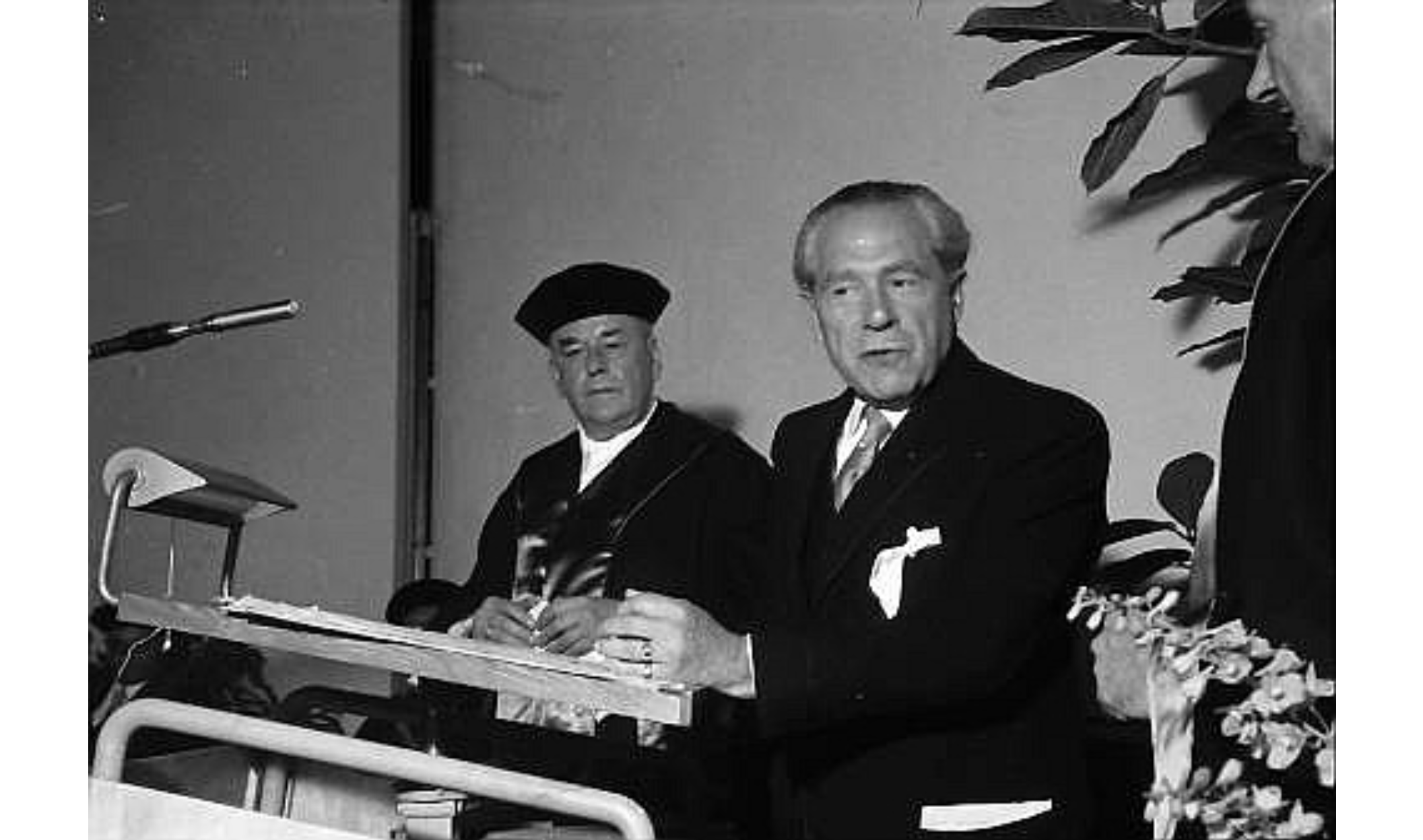
Ludwig Strecker Jr. (right)

Since there were no descendants, the Schott family appointed the privy councillor Ludwig Strecker (1853–1943) as their successor in 1874. His sons, Ludwig Strecker Jr. (1883–1978) and Willi Strecker (1884–1958), continued to run the publishing house. They were succeeded by Heinz Schneider-Schott (1906–1988).

Schott's prestigious 20th century publishing programme, now known as Music of Our Time, was initiated by the publication of works by Igor Stravinsky, a close friend of Willi and Ludwig Strecker for many years. Schott published major works, from early orchestral works such as Feu d'artifice and Scherzo fantastique and the complete L’Oiseau de feu (The Firebird) to the Violin Concerto, Symphony in C and Symphony in Three Movements. Schott also published several major scores of Arnold Schoenberg, including Moses und Aron and Von heute auf morgen.

=== Contemporary music ===
Schott established lifelong working relationships with Paul Hindemith and Carl Orff, and this commitment between composer and publisher has defined the character of the catalogue, involving some of the important composers of their time. Hans Werner Henze, for example, joined Schott at the age of twenty, his considerable oeuvre being published exclusively by them for over 55 years. Michael Tippett's lifelong relationship with Schott began in March 1939 when Willy Strecker visited London for the first (concert) performance in England of Hindemith's Mathis der Maler. Shortly after war had been declared, he heard through their London office that Schott would like to publish his Concerto for Double String Orchestra and an early Piano Sonata. "Being a born internationalist I thoroughly enjoyed this outcome and thought it a good omen." György Ligeti, Krzysztof Penderecki, Alexander Goehr, Aribert Reimann, and Else Schmitz-Gohr have all been published exclusively by Schott for more than thirty years.

This close collaboration continues to support the work of many distinguished composers including Henri Dutilleux, Mark-Anthony Turnage, Peter Eötvös, Chaya Czernowin, Joe Duddell, Moritz Eggert, Mary Finsterer, Kenneth Hesketh, Mary Plumstead, Christian Jost, Tatjana Komarova, Nicholas Lens, Olli Mustonen, Benjamin Schweitzer, Jörg Widmann and Lei Liang.

In 2006, the company changed the name to Schott Music. In 2023, Schott Music became the property of the Strecker Foundation.

==== Music in film ====
Schott Music also publishes the film music compositions of a number of modern film composers. Some of the more prominent film composers on Schott's roster include Erich Wolfgang Korngold, Nino Rota and Howard Shore.

== Award ==
Schott won the 2012 innovation prize for electronic publishing from the Arbeitskreis Elektronisches Publizieren of the Börsenverein des Deutschen Buchhandels.

== See also ==
- Schneider-Schott Music Prize
