= Jozef De Beenhouwer =

Belgian pianist and musicologist (born 1948)

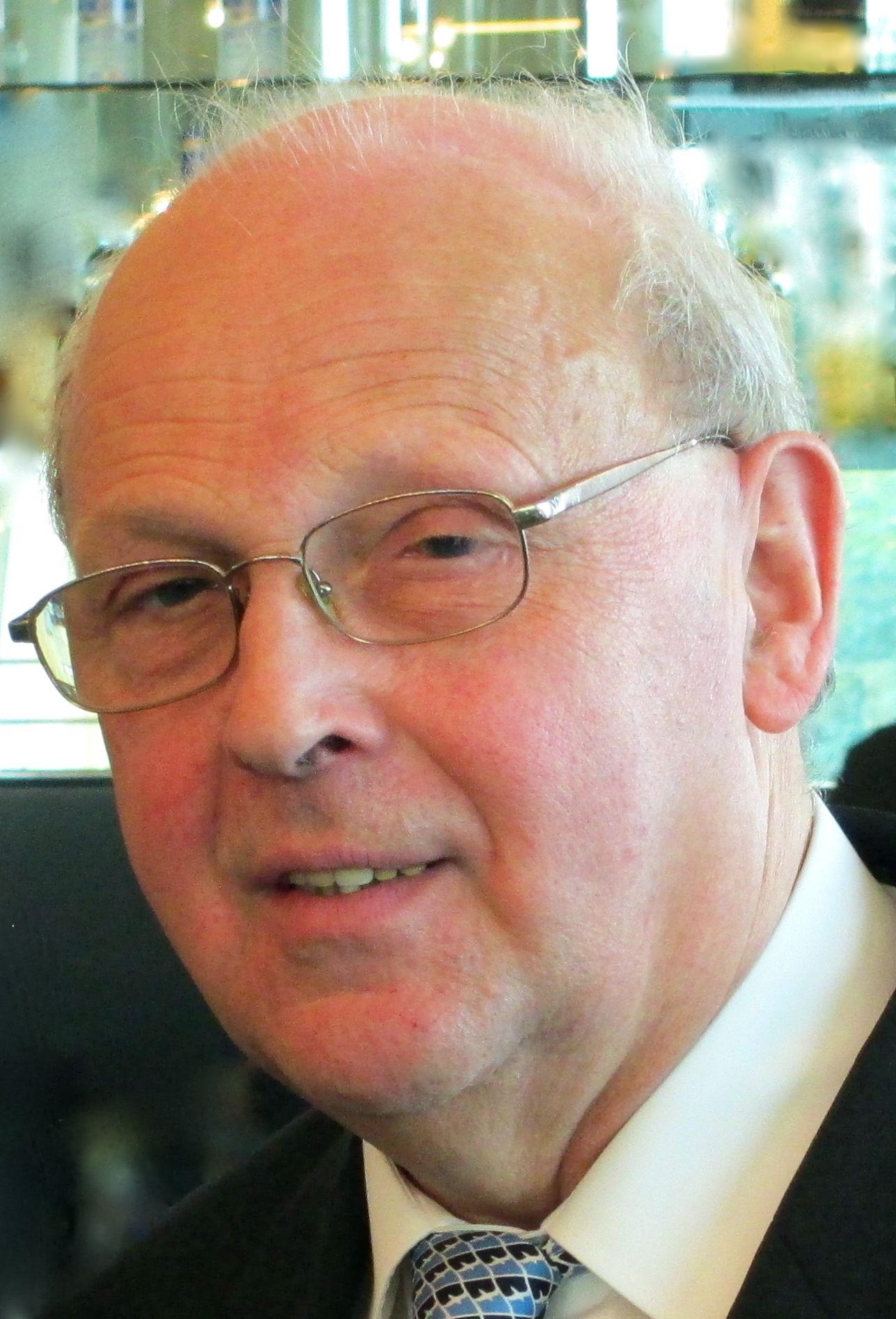

Background information
- Born: 26 March 1948 (age 78); Brasschaat, Belgium
- Instrument: piano

Jozef De Beenhouwer (born 26 March 1948 in Brasschaat, Belgium) is a Belgian pianist, music teacher and musicologist.

== Biography ==
His first teacher, with whom he started at the age of five, was his paternal grandfather. Even as a child and adolescent, he became acquainted with a vast repertoire, and developed a special preference for music by Robert Schumann. In 1964 he began studying with Lode Backx, at first privately; later, after graduating from the Katholieke Universiteit Leuven as a pharmacist (1970), at the Queen Elisabeth College of Music at Waterloo, from which he graduated in 1974, and at the Royal Conservatoire of Antwerp, which granted him the “Hoger Diploma”, its highest degree, summa cum laude in 1975. Another major influence on Jozef De Beenhouwer was David Kimball, with whom he took private lessons in Florence between 1991 and 1998.

As a soloist, both in works for piano solo and in works with orchestra, he has played concerts and made radio and television recordings in many European countries (Belgium, The Netherlands, Germany, Sweden, Portugal, France, Austria, Switzerland, Italy, and the Czech Republic,) in South-Korea and in the United States. He has accompanied singers such as Ria Bollen, Nina Stemme, Robert Holl, and Werner Van Mechelen. As a chamber musician, he has played with Belgian musicians including the clarinetist Walter Boeykens, the pianist Daniel Blumenthal, the violinist Guido Deneve, the violist Leo Deneve, the cellist Edmond Baeyens, the Spiegel Quartet, as well as with international partners such as the violinists Ning Kam and Alexander Kramarov, the violist Hartmut Lindemann, the cellist Marien van Staalen, and the Panocha Quartet. With Kees Hülsmann and Marien van Staalen he forms the Robert Schumann Trio.

For ten years (1986–1996) Jozef De Beenhouwer was an official accompanist at the Queen Elisabeth Music Competition for violin and singing.

He is a regular guest of the Brahms Festival at Mürzzuschlag, Austria.

Jozef De Beenhouwer's recordings include works by Johannes Brahms, Hans Pfitzner, Franz Schubert, and by the German romantic composer Ludwig Schuncke, whose G minor sonata he was the first to perform. His international reputation rests mainly on his Schumann expertise. He managed to reconstruct and complete an unfinished Concertsatz in D minor dated 1839, drawing on Robert Schumann's autograph, whose pages, besides being hard to read, had also been wrongly bound. The world premiere took place in Vienna, 1986, with the Vienna Symphony conducted by Peter Gülke. He completed and orchestrated a Konzertsatz in F minor by Clara Schumann (world premiere in Zwickau, 1986, with the orchestra of the Theater of Zwickau conducted by Albrecht Hofmann). He was the first to record all of Clara Schumann's works for piano solo (three CDs with the label cpo). He serves regularly as a member of the jury of the International Robert Schumann Competition for Piano, and occasionally for other international piano competitions.

Jozef De Beenhouwer is also an ardent champion of music by Belgian, especially Flemish, composers, whose works he plays and records regularly. When he discovers such music that is unpublished, he deciphers them from the manuscript and sometimes publishes them himself; see the bibliography and discography below.

On tour in the US, Jozef De Beenhouwer has played a number of concerts as a soloist and with the violinist Janet Packer, and their programs have all featured American composers, such as Irving Fine, Amy Beach, Gardner Read, Andrew Imbrie and Vittorio Rieti.

Jozef De Beenhouwer succeeded his teacher Lode Backx as a professor of piano at the Royal Flemish Conservatory of Antwerp in 1983. he was also in charge of a chamber music course at the conservatory until 2013, when he reached the mandatory retirement age. Until 2020, he continued as a guest professor, teaching, together with the mezzo-soprano Lucienne Van Deyck, the course of Art Songs, term of which was devoted to German Lieder.

From 1990 until 2015 he was the artistic director of the Brussels Lunchtime Concerts.

Jozef De Beenhouwer is also interested in literature and in painting. His knowledge of literature, particularly of German Romanticism, stands him in good stead in his Schumann studies and in his Art Song class. And he has published the standard monograph on the Belgian-Dutch painter Henry Luyten as well as a book on that painter's school.

== Prizes and Honors ==
- Jozef De Beenhouwer has twice been rewarded with a Caecilia Prize (an award bestowed by the Belgian Association of Music Critics), in 1984 for a recording of works by Peter Benoit and in 1986 for a recording of works by Joseph Ryelandt.
- For his endeavors on behalf of the works of Robert and Clara Schumann, the city of Zwickau awarded him its 1993 Robert Schumann Prize.
- On 29 November 2010 he received the Lifetime Achievement Award of Klara, the classical-music channel of the Vlaamse Radio- en Televisieomroep. From the citation (translated from the Dutch): "An excellent pianist and an internationally recognized Schumann specialist … [who] has always championed Flemish composers with pleasure and with conviction."
- Klara celebrated Jozef De Beenhouwer's 70th birthday on 26 March 2018 by broadcasting recordings of his in all its music programs throughout the day (except in its jazz programs), 12 recordings in all.
- On 12 March 2019 the Peter Benoit Fund awarded its Peter Benoit Prize to Jozef De Beenhouwer "for his manifold and exceptional qualities as performer, editor and researcher and because he has throughout his entire career given special attention to the piano and chamber music of Flemish composers."
- On July 10, 2024, the Beweging Vlaanderen-Europa (a non-profit organization that works to make Flanders better known abroad, especially in Europe) awarded Jozef De Beenhouwer a "Gulden Spoor voor Culturele Uitstraling" (Golden Spur for Championing [Flemish] Culture).

== Bibliography (selection) ==
=== Musicology ===
- Robert Schumann. Konzertsatz für Klavier und Orchester d-moll. Rekonstruiert und ergänzt von Jozef De Beenhouwer. (PB 5181.) Wiesbaden: Breitkopf und Härtel, 1988.
- Clara Schumann . Konzertsatz für Klavier und Orchester f-Moll. Ergänzt und instrumentiert von Jozef De Beenhouwer. (PB 5280.) Wiesbaden: Breitkopf & Härtel, c1994.
- Editions of works by Victor Legley, Joseph Ryelandt, Marinus de Jong, August de Boeck (all published by CeBeDeM); by Peter Benoit (Peter Benoit Fonds, Antwerp and Musikproduktion Höflich, Munich) and by Ernst Krenek (in the journal Gezelliana).
- Jozef De Beenhouwer & Frank Teirlinck, eds. August De Boeck (1865–1937), Componist (Merchtem: Gemeente Merchtem, 2011; ISBN 978-90-817781-0-7. In Dutch. De Beenhouwer is also the author of over well over one-third of the second part of the book, devoted to the discussion of De Boeck's oeuvre.
- August de Boeck Concerto pour piano et orchestre: Bewerking van het concerto voor Hans-klavier door Jozef De Beenhouwer (2018) and Songs to French poems (2021), both published by Musikproduktion Höflich, Munich.

=== Other ===
- Henry Luyten (1859–1945). Antwerpen: MIM, 1995; ISBN 90-341-0857-0 (in Dutch)
- ‘Institut des Beaux Arts Henry Luyten’ at Brasschaat: One Hundred Years On. Brasschaat: Pandora, 2008; ISBN 978-90-5325-293-2

== Discography (selection) ==
- Clara Schumann Complete works for piano solo (cpo 99 758–2)
- Clara Schumann "Complete Songs" (with Miriam Alexandra, soprano, and Peter Gijsbertsen, tenor) (Musikproduktion Dabringhaus und Grimm MDG 903 2114–6)
- Clara Schumann "Piano Transcriptions" (Musikproduktion Dabringhaus und Grimm MDG 903 2115–6)
- Robert and Clara Schumann Liebesfrühling; 3 songs and 8 duets by Robert; 9 songs by Clara (with Peter Gijsbertsen, tenor, and Liesbeth Devos, soprano) (Phaedra CD 292036)
- Robert Schumann Kreisleriana – Chopin-Variationen – Fantasiestücke, op. 111 – Gesänge der Frühe (Phaedra CD 292 007)
- Robert Schumann Carnaval – Kinderszenen – Waldszenen (Phaedra CD 292 018)
- Robert Schumann Dichterliebe – Various Lieder (with Robert Holl) (Preiser 93403)
- Robert Schumann Piano Quintet, op. 44 & Piano Quartet, op. 47 (with the Panocha Quartet) (Phaedra CD 292020)
- Robert Schumann Arabeske, Op. 18 – Fantasiestücke, Op. 12 – Humoreske, Op. 20 – Thema mit Variationen Geistervariationen (Phaedra CD 292037)
- Johannes Brahms Klavierstücke, op. 76, 118 & 119 (Phaedra CD 292012)
- Johannes Brahms Violin Concerto (in Brahms’ own arrangement for violin & piano; world premiere on CD) & Hungarian Dances no. 2, 4 & 15 (in Joachim's arrangement for violin and piano), with Maria Milstein, violin; Rhapsody, Op. 79 no. 2 (CD "Hauskonzert bei Brahms", Brahms Museum, Mürzzuschlag)
- Hans Pfitzner Piano trios (with the Robert Schumann Trio) (CPO 999 735–2)
- Franz Schubert Arpeggione Sonata (with Alfred Lessing, arpeggione) (FCD 368 392)
- Franz Schubert 19 songs (with Peter Gijsbertsen) (Phaedra 292032)
- Franz Schubert Winterreise (with Werner Van Mechelen) (DRK 237139)
- Ludwig Schuncke Works for piano (Schuncke-Archiv 001)
- Henri Duparc "Extase: Complete Songs" (with Peter Gijsbertsen, tenor, and Liesbeth Devos, soprano) (Phaedra CD 292040)
- Richard Strauss "Ich trage meine Minne” Songs (with Peter Gijsbertsen, tenor) (Phaedra CD 292035)
- Jean Louis Nicodé Cello sonata no. 2 (with Marien van Staalen) (Phaedra CD 92017)
- Gösta Nystroem Sånger vid havet (Songs by the Sea) (with Nina Stemme) (Phaedra CD 92040)
- Richard Wagner Wesendonck Lieder (with Nina Stemme) (Phaedra CD 92040)
- Song recital "The Core of All Things", 21 songs by Edgar Tinel, Peter Benoit, Gustave Huberti, Arthur Verhoeven, Arthur Meulemans and Robert Holl with Robert Holl) (Phaedra 92088)
- Peter Benoit two song cycles, De Liefde in het Leven (Love in Life) and Liefdedrama (Tragedy of Love) (with Werner Van Mechelen) and the piano cycle Uit Henriëtte's Album (Phaedra CD 92026/2)
- Peter Benoit Vertelsels en Balladen (Tales and Ballads), op. 34 (Poketino 926682–2)
- Jan Blockx Piano quintet (with the Ensor quartet) (Phaedra CD 92016)
- August de Boeck Cello sonata & Cantalena for cello and piano (with Marien van Staalen) (Phaedra CD 92017)
- August de Boeck Sept Mélodies (set to poems by Jeanne Cuisinier) (with Nina Stemme) (Phaedra CD 92040)
- August de Boeck Piano music (Phaedra CD 92064)
- August de Boeck Concerto for piano and orchestra in C major (with the Janáček Philharmonic Orchestra, Ostrava, conducted by Ivo Venkov) (Phaedra CD 92071)
- August de Boeck A Bouquet of [32] French and Flemish Songs (with Liesbeth Devos) (Phaedra CD 92075)
- Jef van Hoof Songs (with Ria Bollen) (Gailly 87 006)
- Jef van Hoof 30 songs (with Peter Gijsbertsen and Wilke te Brummelstroete) (Phaedra 92090)
- Gustave Huberti "Art Songs" (27 songs on German, Dutch and French texts, with Werner Van Mechelen and Liesbeth Devos) (Antarctica Records AR 070)
- Marinus de Jong Piano concerto no. 1 (with the Radio Orchestra of the BRT conducted by Silveer van den Broeck) – Indian Scenes from The Song of Hiawatha for two pianos (with Daniel Blumenthal) – Six preludes – Ballad Ex Vita Mea (Phaedra CD 92034)
- Marinus de Jong Scherzo-Idyll from Hiawatha's Song – Nocturne Schemeravond op Esschenhof – Three paintings from an exhibition by V. Van Gogh (Phaedra CD 92015)
- Marinus de Jong Sonata Pacis, Doloris et Amoris – Gaudeamus & Meditatio, (both with Ning Kam) – Sonate no. 3 – Nocturne De vertorte Blomme – 2 waltzes and 2 etudes (Phaedra CD 92061)
- Lodewijk Mortelmans Songs (with Werner Van Mechelen) and music for piano (Phaedra CD 92019)
- Lodewijk Mortelmans Piano works (22 short pieces, dated 1912-1949; Antarctica Records AR086)
- Joseph Ryelandt Sonatas no. 2, 4 & 7 – Phantasiestücke, op. 9 – Suite En Ardenne – Six Nocturnes – Prélude et Fugue, op. 49 – Préludes op. 62 & op. 96 (Gailly 87 001–2)
- Joseph Ryelandt Sonates vol. I: nos. 3, 5, 6, 8 and 9 (Antarctica Records AR066); vol. II: nos. 1, 2, 10 and 11, plus six preludes, Op. 62 (Antarctica Records AR072); vol. III: nos. 4 and 7, plus Prelude and Fugue, Op. 49, plus 6 nocturnes (Antarctica Records AR073)
- Joseph Ryelandt Piano quintet and Piano sextet Ach Tjanne (with the Spiegel quartet) (Phaedra CD 92055)
- Music for piano by Paul Gilson, Joseph Jongen, Victor Legley and Ernest van der Eyken

== Sources ==
- Jacob Baert, "Jozef De Beenhouwer: Zingende noten." Ambrozijn 36 #2 (2018–2019): 8–14 (in Dutch)
- Carl De Strycker, "Jozef De Beenhouwer: Nog steeds Clara Schumann-pionier." De Nieuwe Muze 2019 #1: 14–17 (in Dutch)
- Michel Deruyttere, "Jozef De Beenhouwer: Van receptuurtafel naar vleugelpiano." Stethoscoop aan de haak: Witte jassen gaan vreemd Gent: Beefcake Publishing, 2020, pp. 33–41 (ISBN 978-94-93111-22-6) (in Dutch)
