= Phaedra (CD label) =

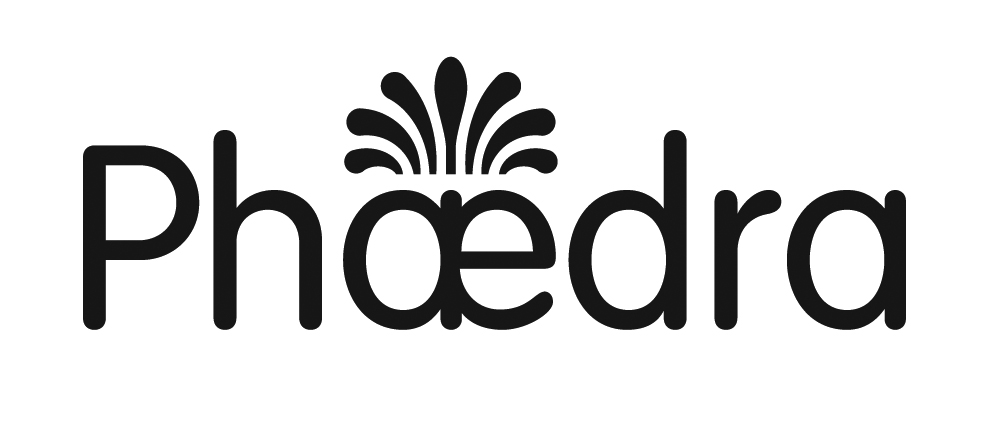
Phaedra's logo

Phaedra is a CD label whose aim it is "to publish works written between 1830 and the present by Flemish (and occasionally Belgian) composers, and to promote them world-wide". The label used to be a subdivision of "Klassieke Concerten vzw" and was therefore not a commercial undertaking: as it was a subdivision of a "vzw", an association without lucrative purpose, Belgian law forbade it to make a profit.

But on February 15, 2019, Phaedra's founder Luc Famaey ceded the label to Dutch Music Works, a besloten vennootschap from Valkenswaard, which "will be the keeper as well as the distributor of all that has been recorded [by Phaedra] up till now."

Phaedra was founded in 1992 by Luc Famaey. Its 2020 catalog lists 143 CDs, which contain works by some 250 composers, issued in two series, In Flanders' Fields (102 CDs) and Phaedra Classics (40 CDs), plus one CD in a series called Mouseion, which was started but discontinued immediately.

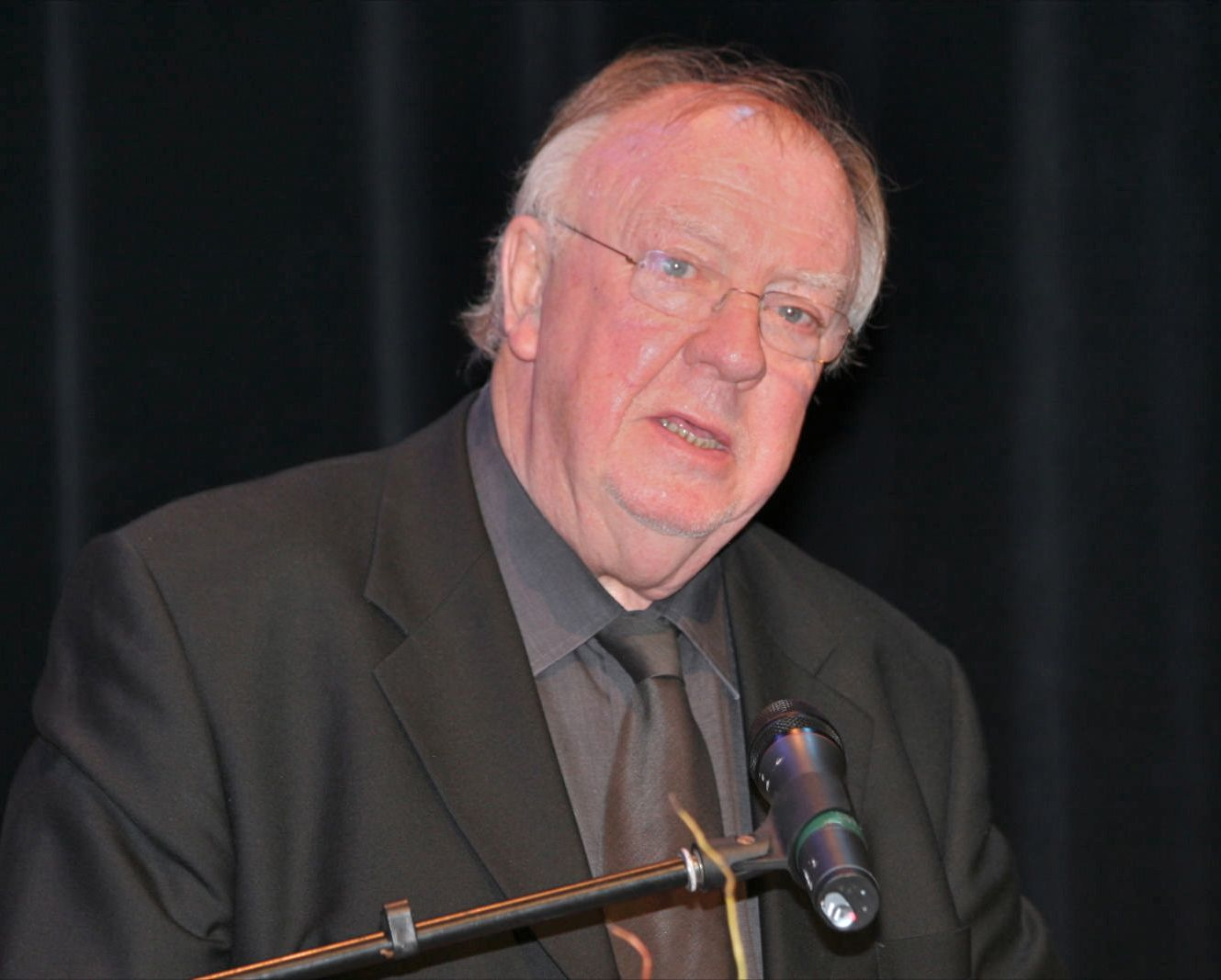
Luc Famaey, in his speech of thanks for the 2010 ANV-Visser Neerlandia Prize

== Phaedra's Founder, Luc Famaey ==
Luc Famaey (Mechelen, November 11, 1940) was introduced by his grandfather into the musical life of his native city, which was flourishing at the time. There was the Municipal Conservatory, whose director was conductor and composer Godfried Devreese, the Lemmensinstituut, directed by Jules Van Nuffel, composer and conductor of the choir of St. Rumbold's Cathedral, and Jef Denyn's carillon school (nowadays the Royal Carillon School "Jef Denyn"), all of which regularly programmed Flemish music. Famaey ended up getting so fascinated by this music, and by classical music in general, that he dropped out of university and began to study music. But he did not become a professional musician. In 1970 he was hired by the "Belgische Radio- en Televisieomroep" (BRT), nowadays the Vlaamse Radio- en Televisieomroeporganisatie (VRT), as "cultural chief assistant", in which function he welcomed and catered for musicians who came to perform for BRT/VRT. He became acquainted with just about every classical musician in Belgium and with many musicians and composers from abroad. To a certain extent he also became familiar with the workings of recording studios. His familiarity with great quantities of Belgian music, his extensive network built up over his many years at BRT/VRT, his technical knowledge of music and—to a lesser extent—of sound recording enabled him to start Phaedra, shortly before he retired.

His aim in doing so is clear from the following quote: "the next generations will rediscover romantic Flemish music." Phaedra is his way to make this music available at home as well as abroad, which is why he always provides English versions of the texts of Phaedra CD booklets.

== In Flanders' Fields ==
With its 102 CDs "In Flanders' Fields (IFF)" is by far Phaedra's most important CD series. Its name alludes to the general ignorance of most of the works on its CDs. Their scores lie buried in libraries, unknown and forgotten, just as the soldiers of World War I lie buried, unknown and forgotten, In Flanders Fields.

The series brings works of over 130 Belgian composers, most of them written in the (late) romantic tradition. But from the very beginning IFF CDs also included works by contemporary, modern composers. Some older music can be found on CDs of choral music, but there are only a couple of CDs containing exclusively older music.

Half of the composers on IFF CDs are virtually unknown; consequently the recordings of their works are almost all world premiere recordings. The others are somewhat better known, though most are not exactly household names:

- Jean Absil
- Alexander Agricola
- Peter Benoit
- Jan Blockx
- August de Boeck
- Josse Boutmy
- Dirk Brossé
- Boudewijn Buckinx
- Loyset Compère
- Claude Coppens
- Frédéric Devreese
- Johan Duijck
- Auguste Dupont
- Ernest van der Eyken
- Willem de Fesch
- Joseph-Hector Fiocco
- Matthias Vanden Gheyn
- Johannes Ghiselin
- Lucien Goethals
- Paul Gilson
- Clémence de Grandval
- Arthur De Greef
- Albert Grisar
- Wim Henderickx
- Robert Herberigs
- Jef van Hoof
- Gustave Huberti
- Albert Huybrechts
- Heinrich Isaac
- Marinus De Jong
- Joseph Jongen
- Josquin des Prez
- Frans Krafft
- André Laporte
- Victor Legley
- Guillaume Lekeu
- Jean-Baptiste Loeillet of London
- Georges Lonque
- Jef Maes
- Martin-Joseph Mengal
- Arthur Meulemans
- Lodewijk Mortelmans
- Vic Nees
- Jules Van Nuffel
- Flor Peeters
- Marcel Poot
- Lucien Posman
- Jan Van der Roost
- Pierre de la Rue
- Joseph Ryelandt
- Jean-Baptiste Singelée
- Daniel Sternefeld
- Rudi Tas
- Edgar Tinel
- Arthur Verhoeven
- Victor Vreuls
- André Waignein
- Adrian Willaert

However, most IFF CDs with works by these better known composers record lesser known works, and are therefore world premieres as well.

Some IFF CDs feature, besides Belgian works, works by (well-known) composers from abroad. For example, #72, Choir Music from Poland and Belgium, features works by César Franck (born in Liège), Vic Nees, Jan Van der Roost and Jules Van Nuffel as well as compositions by Polish composers Ignacy Feliks Dobrzyński, Józef Elsner, Wojciech Kilar and Krzysztof Penderecki. The aim of such juxtapositions is to show that works by Belgian composers can hold their own when confronted with works from abroad.

== Phaedra Classics ==
The main purpose of the Phaedra Classics series is to give Belgian musicians, who often record Belgian works for Phaedra without fees, the opportunity "to shine in works from the great repertoire". Of the 40 Phaedra Classics CDs, 26 feature Belgian musicians exclusively; on 9, Belgian and foreign musicians perform together.

== Prizes and honors ==
A number of Phaedra CDs were awarded national prizes:

- IFF #35 A Tribute to Vic Nees was given the Snepvangers Prize, awarded by the Belgian music press, as the year's best Belgian CD.
- In 2010 Phaedra Classics #24 Clarinet Quintets by Wolfgang Amadeus Mozart and Johannes Brahms and IFF #63 Hanne Deneire, Composer each were awarded a Golden Label by Klassiek Centraal, an important Flemish music website.
- IFF #45 Piet Swerts: Chamber Music was awarded the 2006 Public's Prize of the classical station Klara.
- IFF #98 Piet Swerts: A Symphony of Trees and Phaedra Classics #38 Edvard Grieg: Moderen Synger [songs by Grieg] were each awarded a Golden Label by Klassiek Centraal on June 17, 2018.

as well as international ones:

- (France) In December 2004, IFF #40 Nina Stemme Sings Wagner, Nystroem & De Boeck was given a Diapason d'Or in the category "Découverte" (Discovery) and a "Timbre de platine" by the "Opéra international" magazine.
- (France) On June 24, 2015, IFF #84 A Bouquet of Forgotten Flowers, with art songs by Georges Lonque, Flor Peeters, Henry Georges D'Hoedt, Lodewijk Mortelmans and Prosper van Eechaute, was awarded a special Orphée d'Or by the Académie du disque lyrique
- (France) On January 5, 2015, the music website ResMusica awarded its "Clef" to IFF #85 On the Wings of Winds with music for wind instruments by Joseph Jongen
- (The Netherlands) The Dutch music magazine Luister awarded IFF #74 Welcome Stranger: Music by Lucien Posman its "Luister 10" rating in its September–October issue of 2012; it gave IFF #75 August de Boeck: A Bouquet of French and Flemish Songs the same rating in its March–April issue of 2013.

In addition, the label Phaedra itself also received several awards, sometimes directly, but mostly through its founder, Luc Famaey:

- The 2001 Fuga Trophy of the Union of Belgian Composers.
- In 2007 and in 2011, Klara nominated Luc Famaey as one of its ambassadors of Flemish classical music
- Likewise in 2007, "Luc Famaey, driving force and director of Phaedra Records, who succeeds, without the benefit of official grants, in producing high-quality recordings of Flemish classical music and to distribute them internationally", was awarded the fourth Gaston Feremans Prize by the Mechelen branch of the Marnixring, an originally Flemish but now international service club.
- In 2008, Luc Famaey was awarded a "Gulden Spoor" by the Movement Vlaanderen-Europa
- Luc Famaey was given a 2010 ANV-Visser Neerlandia Prize in the category culture by the Algemeen-Nederlands Verbond
- In 2013, Klara named Luc Famaey "Music Person of the Year"

== Sources ==
- Guy A.J. Tops 2020 Phaedra: Complete Catalog 1992–2020 Antwerp (in English), an update of the 2012 edition (Phaedra 1992–2012 Beveren: Klassieke Concerten vzw). Though privately published, copies were deposited and can therefore be consulted in the Royal Library of Belgium.
- This page (in Dutch) on the August De Boeck website (almost a mirror page of an original Klara webpage, now deleted) contains the biographical data of this article and lists the awards otherwise unsourced in this article.
- "Phaedra Anniversary Concert" in the October 2012 issue of Flanders Today (also available here).
