= Ria Bollen =

Dutch contralto (born 1942)

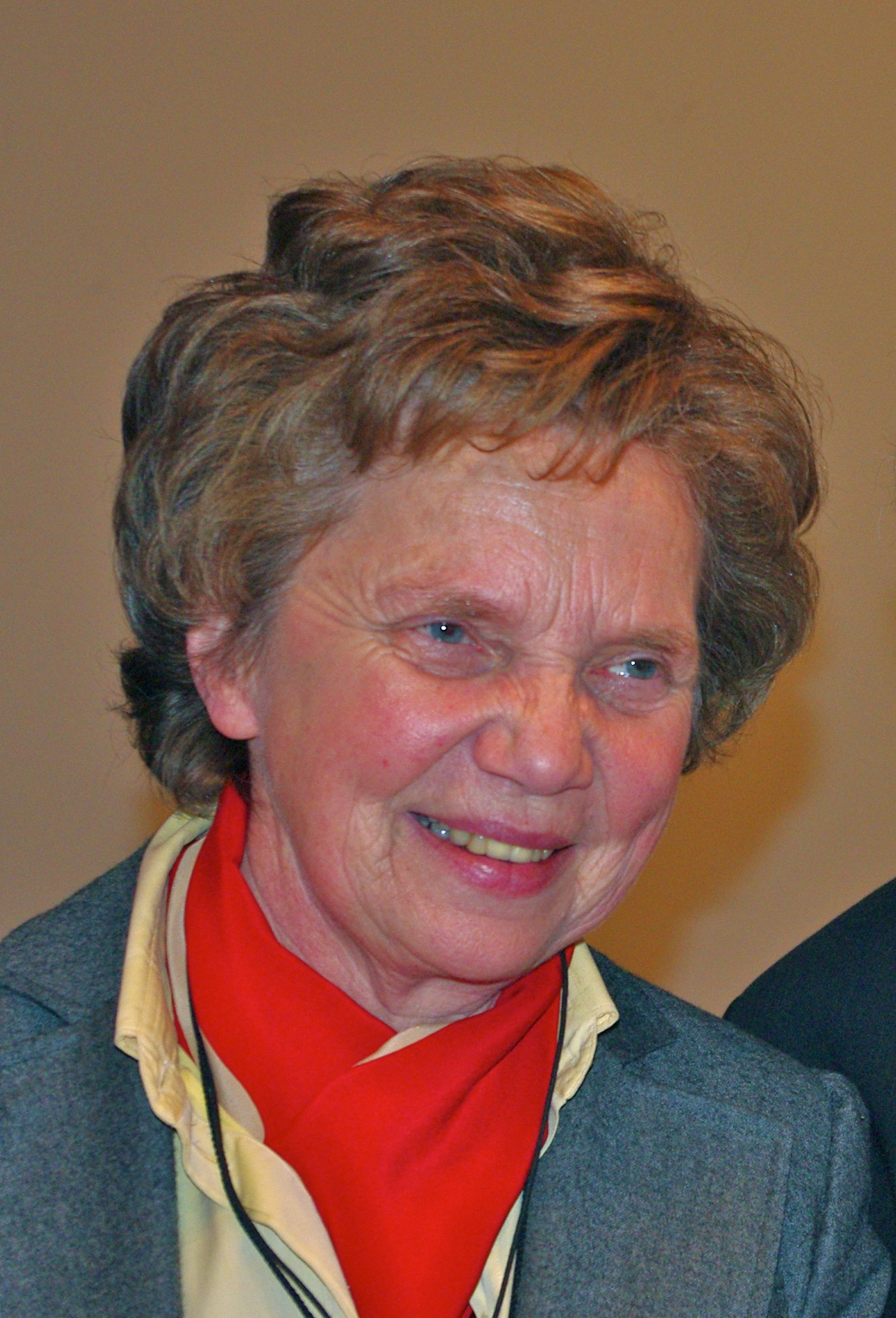
- Ria Bollen in 2010
- Born: 11 February 1942 (age 84); Sint-Truiden, Belgium
- Education: Royal Conservatoire Antwerp
- Occupation: Contralto

Ria Bollen (born 11 February 1942) is a Flemish contralto, who had an international career as a concert singer between 1965 and 1992. Her broad repertoire included Bach's Passions, Mozart's Requiem, Beethoven's Missa solemnis, especially works by Gustav Mahler and works of the 20th century. She was the soloist in the world premiere of Frank Martin's Requiem. She sang many art songs, including by Belgian composers.

== Life ==
Born in Sint-Truiden, Bollen joined a school of classical humanities, and then studied psychology. After two years, she studied voice at the Royal Conservatoire Antwerp with Lucie Frateur, who accompanied her throughout her career. She graduated in 1968 with the major distinction. She also studied with Pierre Bernac, Felix de Nobel, Erik Werba and Christa Ludwig.

She made her debut as a soloist in 1965, in the opera Godelieve by Edgar Tinel conducted by Léonce Gras. Also before she graduated, she obtained the first prize of the Maria Canalswedstrijd in Barcelona, in 1967. She was laureate of four more prestigious competitions: the International Vocal Competition 's-Hertogenbosch (1968), the ARD International Music Competition (1969), the Geneva International Music Competition, in which she won first prize (1970), and the "Internationaler Wettbewerb für Gesang" of the "Gesellschaft der Musikfreunde in Wien", better known as the Vienna Musikverein (1972).

Her repertoire was extensive. She sang works with orchestra or chamber orchestra from

- the Baroque music: Marc-Antoine Charpentier, Motet pour une longue offrande; Vivaldi's Gloria and Bach's St Matthew Passion and St John Passion, Mass in B minor, and a number of cantatas;
- The Classical music: masses by Joseph Haydn, Mozart's Requiem, Beethoven's Missa solemnis and Ninth Symphony No. 9;
- The Romantic music: Les nuits d'été by Berlioz, Altrhapsodie by Brahms, and especially works by Gustav Mahler, whose entire repertoire for alto and orchestra she performed: Lieder eines fahrenden Gesellen, Des Knaben Wunderhorn, Rückert-Lieder, Kindertotenlieder, Das Lied von der Erde, Symphonies No. 2, 3 and 8;
- the 20th century: Hindemith, Die junge Magd; Honegger's Le Roi David and Jeanne d'Arc au bûcher; Janáček, Glagolitic mass; Igor Markevitch's Le paradis perdu; Prokofiev's, Alexander Nevsky; Respighi's Il tramonto; Satie's Socrate; Stravinsky's, Requiem Canticles; Tippett, A Child of Our Time; Wladimir Vogel's Wagadus Untergang durch die Eitelkeit.

Bollen has a special predilection for the work of Frank Martin, who asked her to sing the alto solo in the world premiere of his Requiem, She performed almost everything that Martin composed for her voice type.

Her song repertoire, which she often performed with pianist Jozef De Beenhouwer, was also very extensive, ranging from Purcell to contemporary composers. She performed Zigeunerlieder and Vier ernste Gesänge by Brahms, Dvořák's Gypsy Songs, Schumann's Frauenliebe und -leben, Wladimir Vogel's 5 Lieder nach Texten von Nelly Sachs and Wagner's Wesendonck Lieder, among others. She also sang many works by Belgian composers, such as Peter Benoit, René Defossez, Jef van Hoof, Marinus De Jong, Willem Kersters, Lodewijk Mortelmans, Lodewijk Mortelmans, Flor Peeters and David Van de Woestijne.

She performed in Israel, Japan, Canada and the Soviet Union, but of course mainly in Western Europe, and particularly in the German-speaking part, alongside Belgium and the Netherlands. She sang in many festivals, such as the Festival of Flanders, the Berliner Festwochen, the Wiener Festwochen, the Carinthischer Sommer and the Internationale Bachakademie Stuttgart. She made studio recordings for radio and television in Belgium, the Netherlands, Germany, Austria, France, Luxembourg and Switzerland and could be heard in a large number of well-known and less well-known concert halls throughout Western Europe.

She worked with conductors Léonce Gras, Felix de Nobel, Karl Richter, Peter Schreier, also Herbert Blomstedt, Eduard Flipse, John Eliot Gardiner, Nikolaus Harnoncourt, Christopher Hogwood, Heinrich Hollreiser, Ferdinand Leitner, Igor Markevitch, Georges Prêtre, Gennady Rozhdestvensky, Paul Sacher, Leif Segerstam, Hans Swarowsky, Michael Tilson Thomas and André Vandernoot.

In 1988, Bollen was a member of the jury of the first Queen Elisabeth Competition for singing.

On the occasion of her 75th birthday, Ria Bollen was solemnly received on 10 April 2017 in the Antwerp City Hall and honoured by Mayor Bart De Wever. The laudation was pronounced by Luc Leytens.

== Recordings ==
- Bach, Warum betrübst du dich, mein Herz, BWV 138, part 50 of Helmuth Rilling's complete recordings of Bach cantatas, Hänssler Classic 98630.
- Haydn, Harmoniemesse, Hob. XXII:14, with the SWR Symphonieorchester, Mainzer Bach-Chor, Barbara Martig-Tuller, Adalbert Kraus, Kurt Widmer, conducted by Diethard Hellmann. Profil Medien PH11049.
- Jef Van Hoof, 19 songs, with pianist Jozef De Beenhouwer. René Gailly CD 87 006.
- Frank Martin, Requiem. Jecklin-Disco JD 631–2.
- Pergolesi, Stabat Mater, with Concinite, the Chamber Orchestra Marjeta Delcourte-Korosec and Jill Gomez (soprano), conducted by Karel Aerts). LP Eufoda 1036.
- Arthur Verhoeven, 10 songs, with De Beenhouwer. LP Eufoda 1046.
- Vivaldi, Gloria in D, RV 589, with Südwestdeutsches Kammerorchester Pforzheim, Berner Kammerchor and Ana-Maria Miranda (soprano), conducted by Jörg Ewald Dähler. Claves CLV 0801.
- Homage to Ria Bollen (music by Vivaldi, Bach, Haydn, Mendelssohn, Brahms, Rossini, Respighi, Mahler and De Boeck). Phaedra, In Flanders' Fields vol. 91 (92091).
