= Robert Holl =

Dutch bass-baritone classical singer (born 1947)

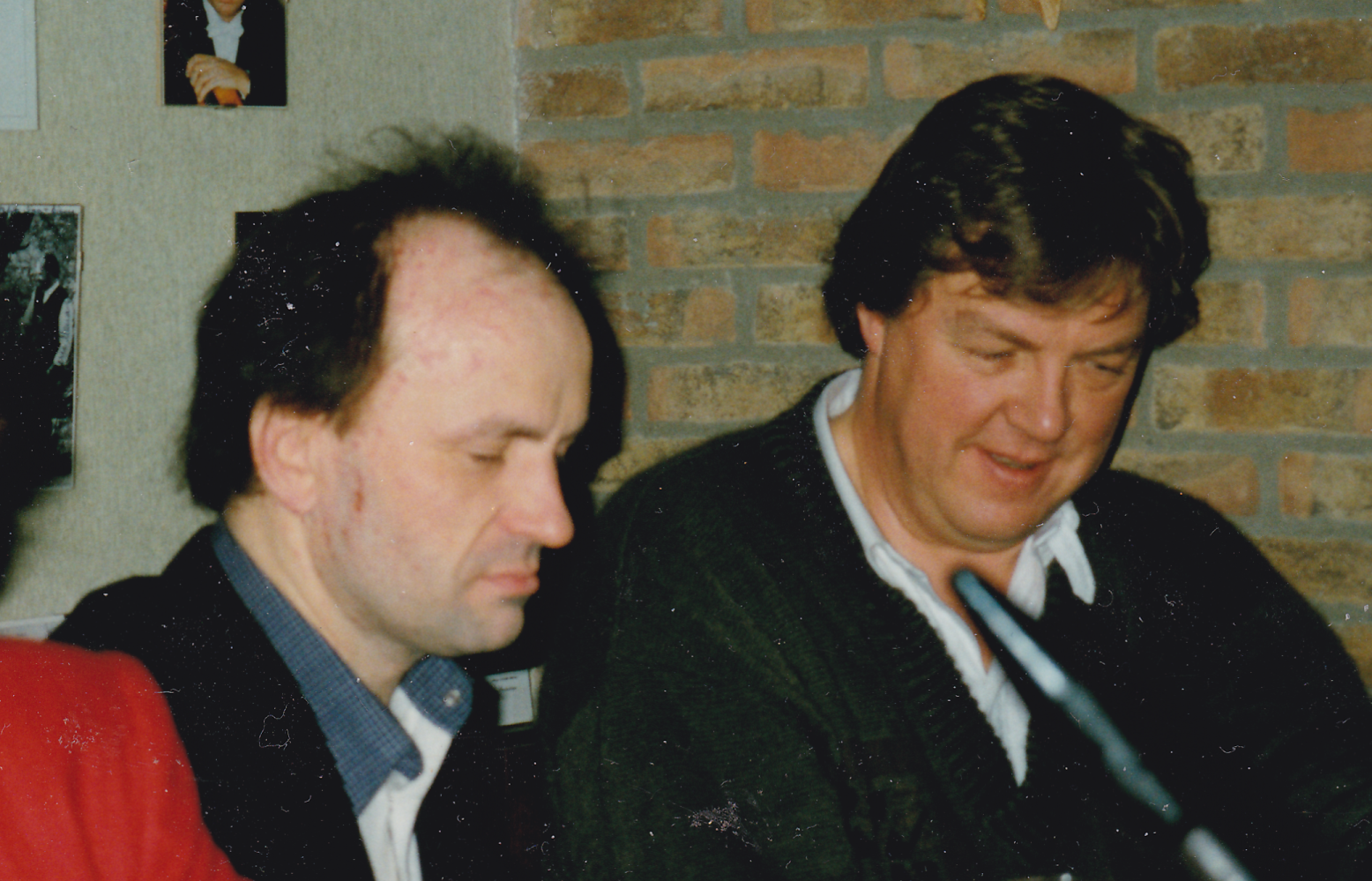
Robert Holl (right) and pianist Andrej Hoteev after a concert in Rotterdam 1990

Robert Holl (born 10 March 1947) is a Dutch bass-baritone classical singer.

== Life and career ==
Holl was born in Rotterdam and studied at the Rotterdams Conservatorium. After winning the first prize at the 1971 International Vocal Competition 's-Hertogenbosch (IVC), he went to study with Hans Hotter in Munich. In 1972, he won the first prize in the ARD International Music Competition. He was then engaged at the Bavarian State Opera from 1973 to 1975.

== Decorations and awards ==
- Kammersänger of the City of Vienna (1990)
- Honorary member of the Society of Friends of Music in Vienna (1997)
- Honorary member of the Carinthian Summer Festival (1997)
- Honorary member of the Weinbruderschaft Krems (26 April 1997)
- Austrian Cross of Honour for Science and Art, 1st class (31 May 2005)
- Knight of the Order of the Netherlands Lion (27 October 2007)

== Selected discography ==
- The Core of All Things songs by Edgar Tinel, Peter Benoit, Gustave Huberti, Arthur Verhoeven, on Phaedra Records.
