= List of symphonies in A-flat major =

The list of symphonies in A♭ major includes:

- Havergal Brian
  - Symphony No. 32 (1968)
- Edward Elgar
  - Symphony No. 1, Op. 55 (1907–8)
- Jef van Hoof
  - Symphony No. 2 (1941)
- Hans Rott
  - Symphony for Strings (unfinished; 3 movements survive) (Nowak 37) (1874–5)
- William Grant Still
  - Symphony No. 1 in A♭ major, "Afro-American" (1930)
- Johann Baptist Wanhal
  - Symphony in A♭ major, Bryan Ab1 (c.1772)
