= Toccata (Schumann) =

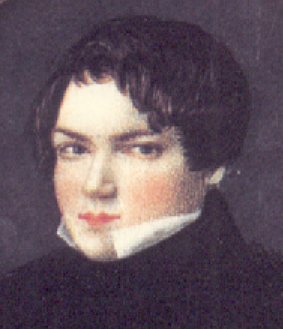
Robert Schumann in 1830

The Toccata in C major, Op. 7 by Robert Schumann, was completed in 1830 and revised in 1833. The piece is in sonata-allegro form.

The work was originally titled Etude fantastique en double-sons (Fantastic Study in Double Notes), and was referred to by Schumann as the "hardest piece ever written"—to this day it remains as "one of the most ferociously difficult pieces in the piano repertoire".

A series of alternating chords introduce the main theme. The development features rapid unison octaves and counterpoint. There is advanced chromaticism and syncopation throughout the work. A typical performance of this piece (with the repeat sign observed) can last anywhere from six to eight minutes.

Schumann dedicated the work to his friend Ludwig Schuncke, who had dedicated his Grande Sonata in G minor, Op. 3, to Schumann. It is partially based on the Czerny Toccata in C major, Op. 92, which Clara Schumann spent much of her youth practicing.
