= Requiem (Martin) =

1972 musical composition by Frank Martin

- by Frank Martin
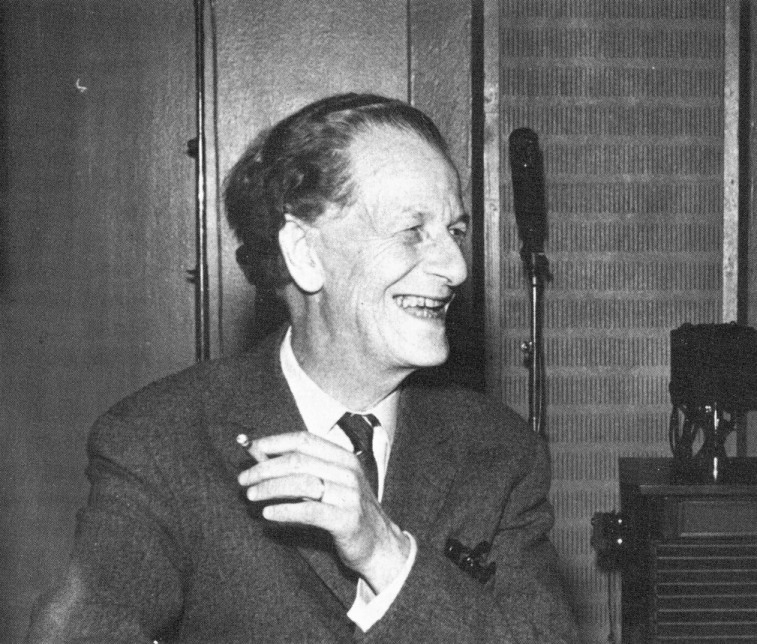
- Frank Martin in 1959
- Text: Requiem
- Language: Latin
- Composed: 1971–72
- Performed: 4 May 1973
- Published: 1976
- Movements: 8
- Scoring: four soloists; mixed choir; orchestra; organ

Requiem is a setting of the Latin Mass for the dead for four soloists, mixed choir, orchestra and organ by Frank Martin. Composed in 1971 and 1972, it was premiered at Lausanne Cathedral on 4 May 1973, with the composer conducting the Orchestre de la Suisse Romande. It has been described as the composer's masterpiece.

== History ==
Frank Martin composed the Requiem, a setting of the Latin Mass for the dead, towards the end of his life, returning from a Mediterranean cruise in 1971. He said that he was inspired to compose the work by visiting three places of worship, San Marco in Venice, Monreale Cathedral in Palermo, and the Greek temples at Paestum near Naples. He set it for four soloists, mixed choir, orchestra and big organ ("pour quatuor vocal solo, chœur mixte, orchestre et grand orgue"), and completed the work in 1972. He conducted the world premiere at Lausanne Cathedral on 4 May 1973, with vocal soloists Elisabeth Speiser, Ria Bollen, Éric Tappy and Peter Lagger, organist André Luy, the Ars Laeta vocal ensemble and the Union chorale de Lausanne choir, and the Orchestre de la Suisse Romande, in a performance that was recorded. The Requiem was published by Universal Edition in 1976. The first performance recording was reissued in 1991 on CD, and has been described as authoritative.

== Music ==
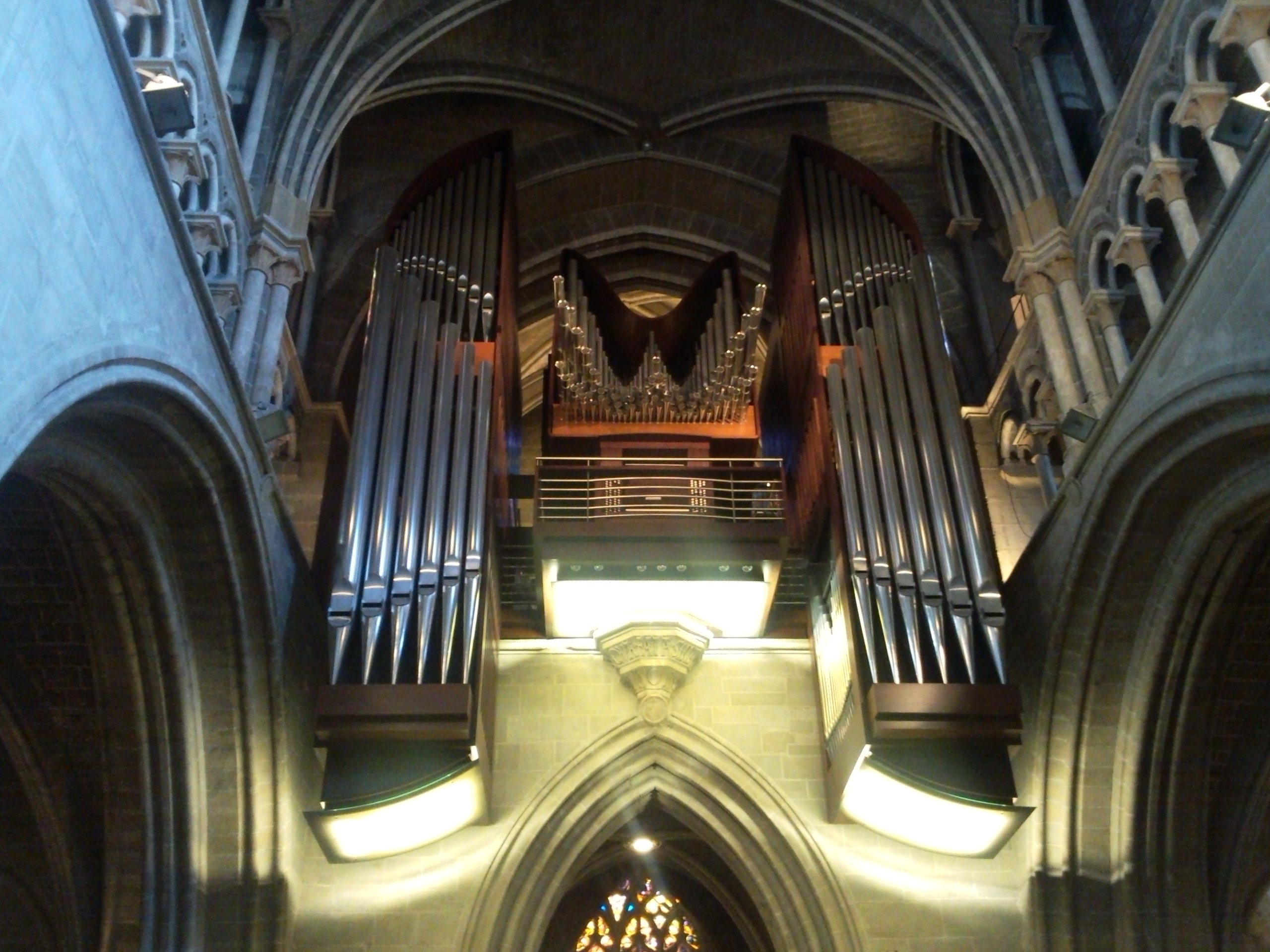
Grand orgue at the Lausanne Cathedral, which featured in the premiere

The Requiem is structured in eight movements:

1. Introitus
2. Kyrie
3. Dies Irae
4. Offertorium
5. Sanctus
6. Agnus Dei
7. In Paradisum
8. Communion

The work is scored for four vocal soloists (soprano, alto, tenor and bass), four-part choir (at times divided), orchestra, harpsichord and organ. The movements are organized in subsections with sometimes different tempo markings and scoring. The beginning of the Introitus, marked Molto lento (very slowly), "Requiem aeternam", is set for soprano and tenor soloists with women's choir. The central "Te decet" is set for the four soloists, leading to a repeat of the first sentence, now for the two soloists and the full choir. The Kyrie is a canon, marked Andante, for all solo and choral voices.

The Dies irae sequence begins Vivace with a speaking choir and a battery of percussion. The offertory "Domine Jesu Christe" is marked Andante con moto, and is set for divided choir voices with harpsichord and strings. Sanctus begins with a six-part choir (SAATTB), marked Largo. Agnus Dei, also Largo, is for alto solo and organ. In Paradisum, marked Andante molto moderato, is scored for soprano solo and six-part choir (SATTBB) with four solo wind instruments (two flutes, oboe and clarinet), strings, harpsichord and organ. Communion begins with "Lux aeterna", again led by the soprano solo, followed by all voices.

The duration is given as 45 minutes.
