= Arthur Meulemans =

Flemish composer (1884–1966)

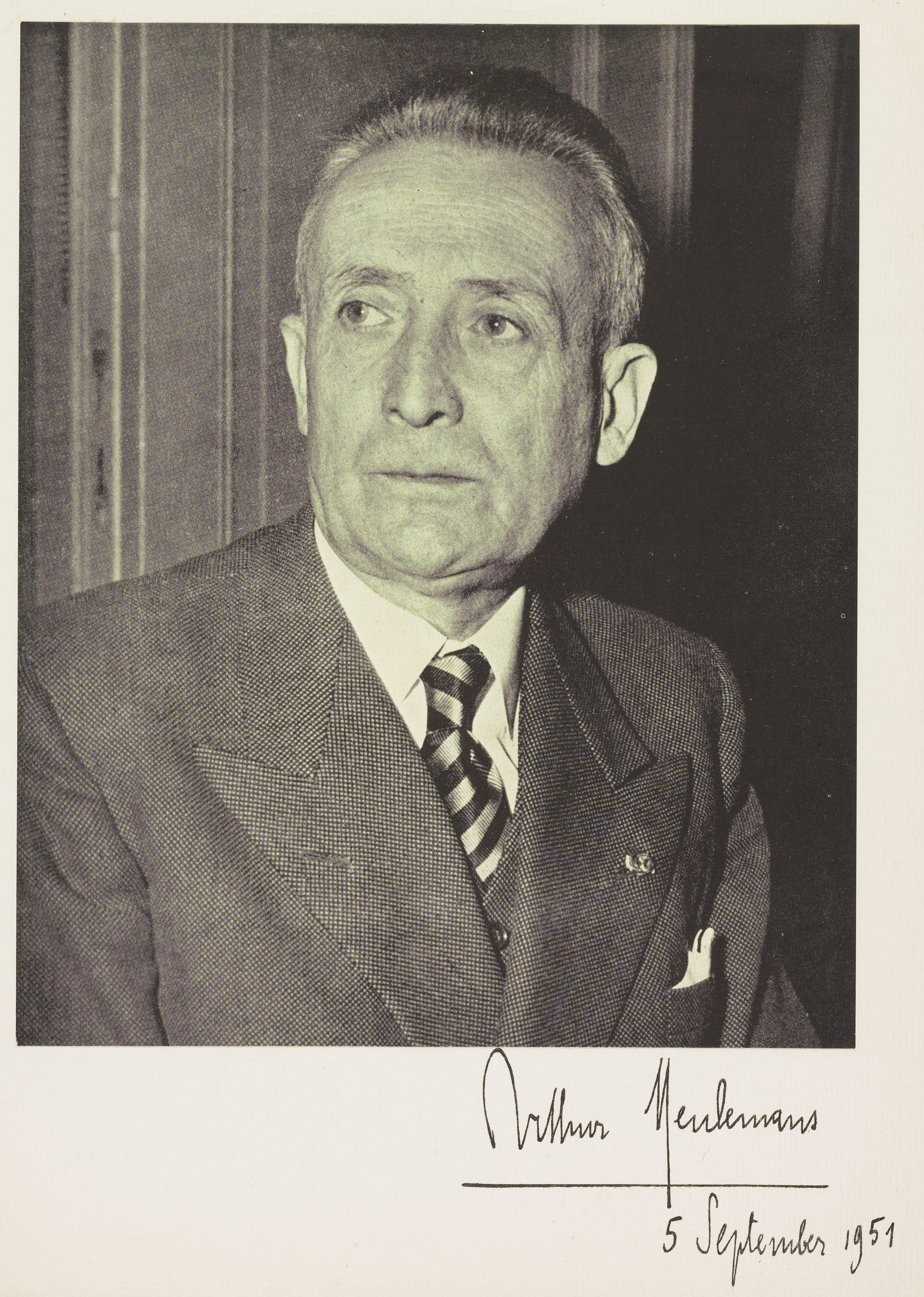
- Born: 19 May 1884; Aarschot, Belgium
- Died: 29 June 1966 (aged 82); Etterbeek, Belgium
- Era: 20th century

Arthur Meulemans (19 May 1884 in Aarschot – 29 June 1966 in Etterbeek) was a Belgian composer, conductor, and music teacher.

== Biography ==
Meulemans’ father was an artisan and a music lover who composed dance music. As a child, Arthur Meulemans received his first music lessons from his father and his uncle Jan, who taught him to play the piccolo. He also got violin classes from a certain mister Single, and piano lessons from Ernest Maréchal. Alfons van den Eynde, a student of Peter Benoit, gave the boy introductory classes in harmony, counterpoint, and fugue.

Meulemans studied at the Lemmensinstituut in Mechelen with, among others, Edgar Tinel, Aloys Desmet, and Oscar Depuydt. After completing his final exams, he became a teacher at this institution and remained so until 1914. He got married in 1911 and settled in Tongeren, where he taught music at the Koninklijk Atheneum (a high school). This situation lasted until 1930, the year in which Meulemans was appointed as conductor (together with Fernand Quinet) of the newly founded Vlaams Radio Orkest in Brussels., which nowadays is known as the Brussels Philharmonic. In 1916, he found the Limburge Orgel- en Zangschool in Hasselt. From 1932 until his death, Meulemans lived and worked in Brussels. In 1954 he was also appointed as the president of the Royal Flemish Academy.

Meulemans conducted several music societies run by amateurs, such as the Royal Harmony Vreugd en Deugd, where he worked between 1922 and 1930.

Arthur Meulemans, who is better known than his brother and composer Herman Meulemans, can be seen as a transitional figure between the Romantic Flemish generation, which appeared after Peter Benoit and Edgar Tinel, and the modern, international music that was established in Belgium thanks to August Baeyens. In 1909 Meulemans won the Prix de Rome with his oratorio De legende van de Heilige Hubertus. Shortly before the start of World War I, his Kinderliederen were awarded with the Karel Boury Prize of the Flemish Royal Academy.

Together with Lodewijk Mortelmans, Lodewijk De Vocht, Jef Van Hoof and Gaston Feremans, Arthur Meulemans could be described as part of a Flemish Mighty Handful.

== Style ==
Meulemans composed a big symphonic oeuvre and, with his more than 350 pieces, is one of the most productive and well-known Belgian composers of the first half of the 20th century. He was born during the late romantic period and lived through the impressionism period during his teenage years. His greatest accomplishments are expressionistic. His style evolved from a romantic style to a more modern way of working, but throughout his work a strong lyricism remained a constant element.

Meulemans orchestration was tight, but colourful. His music shows a certain harmonic severity, but he does not leave tonality. A major part of his compositions are of a descriptive-programmatic sort, often related to his homeland Flanders.

Meulemans wrote over 15 symphonies, three operas, solo concerti for many different instruments, five string quartets, songs, oratorios and choir works. At the start of his career, he was mainly known for his vocal works, but after 1930 he started to focus on orchestral music.

== Compositions ==
=== Works for orchestra ===
==== Symphonies ====
- 1931 Symfonie in B
- 1933 Symphony No. 2 in C
  1. Largamente - Allegro
  2. Adagio
  3. Scherzo: Allegro vivace
  4. Allegro brillante
- 1933 Symphony No. 3 "Dennensymfonie"
  1. Andate sostenuto - Allegro ma non troppo
  2. Andante
  3. Scherzo: Allegro vivo
  4. Finale: Maestoso
- 1939 Symphony No. 5 "Danssymfonie", for female voice and orchestra
- 1939 Symphony No. 6 "Zeesymfonie", for large orchestra, alto and mixed choir - text: Ferdinand Vercnocke
- 1940 Symphony No. 7 "Zwaneven"
  1. Con moto (Ritme van horizonten, Ochtend)
  2. Allegro vivo assai (Scherzo) (De heide bloeit)
  3. Sostenuto (Bosschage - onder de dennen)
  4. Allegro con brio (Final) (Zon over de heide)
- 1942 Symphony No. 8 "Herffstsymfonie"
- 1943 Symphony No. 9 in F "Droomvuur"
- 1943 Symphony No. 10 "Psalmensymfonie", for speaking chorus, solo voices, mixed choir and orchestra
- 1945 Symphony No. 11
- 1948 Symphony No. 12
- 1951 Symphony No. 13 "Rembrandtsymfonie"
- 1954 Symphony No. 14
- 1960 Symphony No. 15

==== Concertante works ====
- 1910 De rozen doornen, for cello and orchestra
- 1920 Concerto nr. 1, for cello and orchestra
- 1927 Woudzang en Zigeunerin for violin and orchestra
- 1929 Concert impromptu, for piano and orchestra
- 1929 Lente elegie, for cello and orchestra
- 1929 Herfst elegie, for cello and orchestra
- 1929 Idylle van een Citadin, for oboe and orchestra
- 1932 Rhapsodie, for clarinet and orchestra
- 1939 Concerto No. 1, for horn and orchestra
- 1939 Lyrische suite, for harp and orchestra
- 1941 Concertino, for piano and orchestra
- 1941 Rhapsodie, for trombone and orchestra
- 1941 Concerto No. 1, for piano and orchestra
- 1942 Concerto No. 1, for oboe and orchestra
- 1942 Concerto No. 1, for violin and orchestra
- 1942 Concerto, for viola and orchestra
- 1943 Concerto, for fluit and orchestra
- 1943 Concerto, for trumpet and orchestra
- 1944 Concerto No. 2, for cello and orchestra
- 1945 Concerto No. 2, for violin and orchestra
- 1948 Sonata concertante, for clarinet and orchestra
- 1953 Concertino, for trombone and orchestra
- 1953 Concerto, for harp and orchestra
- 1954 Concerto, for timpani and orchestra
- 1956 Concerto No. 2, for piano and orchestra
- 1959 Concerto, for two pianos and orchestra
- 1961 Concerto Grosso, for saxophone quartet and orchestra
- 1961 Concerto No. 2, for horn and orchestra
- 1962 Concertino, for saxophone quartet and orchestra
- 1962 Concerto Grosso No. 2, for sextet and orchestra
- 1964 Suite, for clarinet quartet and orchestra

==== Overtures ====
- 1916 De Kerels van Vlaanderen - Ouverture
- 1932 Ouverture en suite
- 1935 Adriaen Brouwer: Ouverture van het zangspel
- 1940 Overtura allegra
- 1955 Ouverture voor Tartarin de Tarascon

==== Other orchestral works ====
- 1910 Mei nacht - Nuit de mai
- 1911 Exotische Dans
- 1913 Plinius’ fontein
  1. Moderato: Summer Morning at Pliny's Fountain
  2. Poco con moto: At Twilight
  3. Allegro: Night Festival
- 1913 Wals
- 1915 Herderszang, for flute and orchestra
- 1916 Praeludien, for chamber orchestra
- 1921 De boodschap, for narrator and orchestra, Op. 31 - text: Wies Moens
- 1922 Heideschetsen, for small orchestra
- 1924 Kerstidylle, for oboe and orchestra
- 1926 Karnaval - suite, for piano and orchestra
- 1927 Maskaroen
- 1928 Stadspark, scherzo with praeludium for orchestra
- 1929 Rapsodie
- 1929 Serenata
- 1929 Twee Idyllen, for oboe and orchestra
- 1930 Twee dansen
- 1930 Kermis Fantasie op twee volksrythmen naar een schilderij van David Teniers
- 1930 Kleine Suite in C, for small orchestra
- 1943 Dansensuite nr. 1, for chamber orchestra
- 1943 Dansensuite nr. 2, for small orchestra
- 1947 De vogels
- 1948 Op de dennenheuvelen
- 1951 Symfonietta, for small orchestra
- 1951 Symphonische triptiek
- 1951 Tableaux
- 1951 Meteorologisch instituut
- 1952 Peter Breugel
- 1952 Concerto No. 1, for orchestra
- 1953 Hertog Jan van Brabant
- 1954 Symfonisch rondo
- 1954 Evasies
- 1955 Academische triptiek
- 1955 Social security
- 1956 Ionisatie
- 1956 Concerto No. 2, for orchestra
- 1957 Symphonische dansen
- 1959 Sinfonietta No. 2, for orchestra
- 1960 Sinfonietta No. 3
- 1961 Cirkus
- 1961 Middelheim
- 1961 Divertimento
- Le jeu des saisons; for narrator and orchestra - text: Gerda de Gonzalès
- Reidansen
- Symfonische liederen, for voice and orchestra
- Tourments, for narrator and orchestra

=== Works for brass band ===
- 1909 Strijd, for brass band (alternatively for choir and brass band) - text: Jan Hammenecker
- 1917 Jeugd-album - 1e deel, for brass band
- 1919 Vlaanderen roept, for choir and brass band - text: René Declercq
- 1935 Barabbas, for mixed choir and brass band - text: Michel de Ghelderode
- 1935 Symfonie nr.4, for winds and percussion
- 1936 Credo, for mixed choir, children's choir and brass band - text: Joseph Boon
- 1937 Gent, for choir and brass band - text: René Declercq
- 1937 Noordzeetriptiek, for male choir and brass band - text: Ferdinand Vercnocke
- 1937 Rouwfanfare, for brass band
- 1938 Inaugurele fanfare, for brass band
- 1938 Klokke Roeland, for brass band
- 1938 Brugge, for choir and brass band
- 1938 Fanfare, for brass band
- 1938 Yzerpsalm, for choir and brass band - text: Ferdinand Vercnocke
- 1939 Lentefanfares - Zomerfanfares, for brass band
- 1939 Oproepen voor fanfares, for brass band
- 1939 V.N.Z. fanfare-motief, for brass band
- 1939 Vier oproepen, for brass band
- 1942 Suite, for brass band
- 1942 Vijf oproepen voor fanfare, for brass band
- 1942 Wij trekken naar de verte, for choir and brass band - text: Leo Poppe
- 1944 Lieve Vrouwe van ons land, for choir and brass band - text: L. Monden S.J.
- 1945 Zegen het land, for brass band
- 1946 Burchtlied, for brass band
- 1947 De man, for choir and brass band
- 1947 Op Kameraden, for choir and brass band - text: Leo Poppe
- 1948 Fanfare 1948, for brass band
- 1948 Vier wevertjes, for choir and brass band
- 1949 Eere den arbeid, for choir and brass band - text: Ferdinand Vercnocke
- 1950 Het lied van de boeren, for choir and brass band - text: K. Cruysberghs
- 1951 Schoonste aller landen, for choir and brass band - text: K. Heireman
- 1958 Fanfare, for brass band
- 1962 Concerto for organ and brass band
- Beiaardlied, for choir and brass band
- Belgisch volkslied, for brass band
- De Vlaamsche leeuw, for choir and brass band
- Het lied der Vlamingen, for choir and brass band
- Het lied van de baren, for brass band
- Jeugd-litanie, for brass band
- Kent gij dat volk, for choir and brass band
- Klaroent vuur!, for choir and brass band - text: P. J. Boon
- Kunst is de kracht, for choir and brass band
- Liederen, for choir and brass band
- Mijn Vlaandren heb ik hartlijk lief, for choir and brass band with Theban trumpets
- O kruise den Vlaming, for choir and brass band
- Strijdkreet, for choir and brass band
- Van Rijswijck-Marsch, for choir and brass band
- Vlaanderen, for choir and brass band - text: Willem Gijssels
- Wilhelmus, for choir and brass band
- Willem van Saeftingen, for choir and brass band - text: Willem Gijssels

=== Masses, cantatas and religious music ===
- 1905 Cantate Jubilaire, cantata
- 1909 De legende van de Heilige Hubertus, oratorio for soli, mixed choir and orchestra - text: Victor De Meyere
- 1911 Responsoria, for mixed choir and organ
- 1913 Responsoria Varia, for soli (soprano-alto), mixed choir and organ
- 1913 Responsoria, for soli, mixed choir and organ
- 1914 Missa da pacem, for 2 Tenors, Bariton, male choir and organ
- 1914 Te Deum, for mixed choir and organ
- 1916 Missa in honorem Beatae Mariae Virginis, for 2 voices and string orchestra, Op. 25
- 1916 Missa in honorem Sancti Joseph, for 2 voices (children - men) and organ, Op. 34
- 1917 Sacrum Mysterium, for soli, children's choir, mixed choir and orchestra
- 1917 Oremus pro Antistite, for mixed choir, children's voices (boy and girls) and organ
- 1924 Blommensuite, for male choir - text: Alice Nahon
- 1926 Lof-litanie van den Heilige Franciscus van Assisië, for recitant, Bariton and orchestra - text: Marnix Gijsen
- 1930 Missa in honorem Sancti Servatii, for 5 unequal voices and organ
- 1932 Missielied voor de jeugd, for choir and orchestra - text: Jef Bloemen
- 1935 Missa in honorem Sanctae Teresiae, for 3 (male) voices and orchestra
- 1935 Panis angelicus, for spoken choir, female voices and orchestra - text: Joseph Boon
- 1936 Heilige Cecilia, for mezzo-soprano solo, female choir, violin, cello, piano, harp, timpani, harmonium - text: Joseph Boon
- 1937 Avondwierook - Encens du soir, for spoken choir, female voices and orchestra - text: Joseph Boon
- 1942 Missa Exaudi nos, for mixed choir and organ
- 1943 Adeste Fideles, voor soprani, for mixed choir and organ
- 1943 Psalmus 147: Lauda Jerusalem, for mixed choir and organ
- 1943 De litanie van Onze Lieve Vrouw, for mixed choir and grand organ
- 1943 Het onze Vader, for alto solo and piano
- 1944 Quatuor Motetta ad Laudes Vespertinas, for two voices and organ
- 1945 Missa Alba, for two equal voices and orchestra
- 1945 Missa aurea, for mixed choir and orchestra
- 1946 Ave Maria, for two equal voices and organ
- 1946 O Jesus soete aendachtigheid, for mixed choir
- 1948 Die soete naem Jesus, for mixed choir - text: H. van Duy
- 1949 Maria's zonnelied, for choir, recitant and orchestra - text: Frans Eykans
- 1949 Missa Ignis vibrans lumine, for 3 male voices and orchestra
- 1953 Het avondmaal, for mixed choir - text: Pieter G. Buckinx
- 1956 Missa "Mysterium Fidei", for 4 mixed voices and organ
- 1956 Ubi caritas, for 4 unequal voices and organ
- Ave Regina Caelorum, for male choir
- Clachte van Maria benevens het Kruis, for mixed choir - text: Justus de Harduyn (1582–1636)
- Stella Maris, for mezzo-soprano, 3 voices and organ
- Virgo singularis, for one voice (buzzing choir of voces angelicae ad libitum) and organ

=== Music theater ===
==== Opera ====
Completed	Title	Acts	Première	Libretto
1926/1947	Adriaen Brouwer	3 acts	1947, Antwerp	Frans W. C. de Witt-Huberts
1937	Vikings	3 acts	1937, Antwerp	Emiel Buskens
1944	Egmont	3 acts	1960, Antwerp	Jos van Rooy

=== Choral works ===
- 1908 Land, for choir and orchestra
- 1913 Heil 't vaderland, for children's choir and orchestra - text: Willem Gijssels
- 1915 Kerstliedeke, for mixed choir and piano - text: Jef Leynen
- 1917 Een lof in volkstrant, for choir and organ
- 1918 Aan zee - La mer, for children's choir and orchestra - text: Willem Gijssels
- 1919 'n Suite Oudvlaamse liederen, for mixed choir
- 1919 Vlaanderen roept
- 1919 Sacrale dans, for mixed choir and orchestra - text: E. Buskens
- 1921 De tocht, for mixed choir and orchestra - text: Wies Moens
- 1923 De eenzame weg, for mixed choir, recitant and orchestra - text: Jules Schurmann
- 1925 Koor van de violiers uit het zangspel "Adriaen Brouwer", 1e Akt, for male choir and piano - text: Frans W. C. de Witt Huberts
- 1926 O Vlaamsche held, for choir and orchestra - text: Guido Gezelle
- 1929 Een levenslied, for mixed choir and piano
- 1935 Barabbas
- 1936 Credo
- 1937 Gent
- 1937 Kameraad, for male choir and 4 horns (ad. lib.) - text: Ferdinand Vercnocke
- 1937 Noordzeetriptiek
- 1937 Rijpende oogst for mixed choir and orchestra - text: E. H. L. Engelen
- 1938 Brugge
- 1938 Yzerpsalm
- 1942 Wij trekken naar de verte
- 1944 Lieve Vrouwe van ons land
- 1945 O Nederland let op U saeck, for mixed choir
- 1947 Op Kameraden
- 1947 Jachtkoor uit de Triptiek "de Goddelijke Jager", for male choir and piano - text: Frans Eykans
- 1947 Nooi van die Velde, South-African folksong for mixed choir
- 1948 Vier wevertjes
- 1949 Het spel van Deinze, for choir, recitant and orchestra - text: Arthur Verstraeten
- 1949 Het vendel, for mixed choir - text: Waar G. Forster (1514–1568)
- 1949 Eere den arbeid
- 1949 De Witte, for mixed choir and orchestra
- 1950 De zang van de aarde, for mixed choir and piano - text: K. Cruysberghs
- 1950 Dorserslied, for male choir and piano - text: K. Cruysberghs
- 1950 Het lied van de boeren
- 1950 Jan de Mulder, for mixed choir
- 1950 'k zie Brugge 't liefst, for mixed choir - text: J.M. Devos
- 1951 Een meisje dat van Scheveningen kwam, for mixed choir
- 1951 Schoonste aller landen
- 1952 De kinkhoorn der seizoenen, for recitant, mixed choir and orchestra - text: Pieter G. Buckinx
- 1953 11 Kinderliedjes, for unisono children’s choir
- 1953 Gebed, for male choir - text: Pieter G. Buckinx
- 1953 Het onvergankelijk zaad, for male choir - text: Pieter G. Buckinx
- 1953 Het regent in de nacht, for mixed choir - text: Pieter G. Buckinx
- 1962 Pigeon vole, for choir and piano - text: Maurice Carême
- 1966 La légende du chien vert, for male choir and orchestra- text: Gerda de Gonzalès
- Beiaardlied
- De Vlaamsche leeuw
- Florens ut rosa, for choir and organ
- Het lied der Vlamingen
- Kent gij dat volk
- Klaroent vuur!
- Kunst is de kracht
- Liederen
- Mijn Vlaandren heb ik hartlijk lief
- O kruise den Vlaming
- Strijdkreet
- Van Rijswijck-Marsch
- Vlaanderen
- Wilhelmus
- Willem van Saeftingen

=== Vocal music with orchestra or instruments ===
- 1904 Nieuwe lente, for high voice and orchestra
- 1905 Jonge liefde, for soprano and orchestra - text: Jan Eelen
- 1905 Gezelle-Liederen, song cycle
- 1907 Lenteavond, for high voice and orchestra - text: Willem Kloos
- 1907 Koornbloemen vlecht ik u ten krans, for tenor and piano - text: E. Geibel
- 1910 De rozen droomen, for mezzosoprano, cello and string orchestra - text: Karel Van De Woestijne
- 1912 De Nethe, for soli, vocal quartet solo, children’s choir and orchestra - text: Lodewijk Mercelis
- 1913 Kinderliederen, for voice and piano, op. 21 - text: Willem Gijssels
- 1921 De zeven weeën, for soli, children’s voices, mixed choir and orchestra - text: Hilarion Thans
- 1923 De Hovenier, text: Rabindranath Tagore
- 1924 Passie-bloemen, for recitant, solimixed choir and orchestra - text: Hilarion Thans
- 1925 De tocht naar de liefde, for soli, choir and orchestra - text: Joseph Boon
- 1926 Huldezang aan Hendrik van Veldeke, for solo, recitant, choir and orchestra - text: Pieter G. Buckinx - Ode du prologue: Jan Melis
- 1927 Josef in Dothan, for soprano, alto and orchestra - text: Joost Van De Vondel
- 1934 Paaschbrief aan mijn zoon, for bariton and orchestra - text: Otto Zupancic
- 1939 Nachtliedjes, for soprano and orchestra - text: P. Van Langendonck en Jef Leynen
- 1941 De hoge mouw - Nazomer pastorale, for vocal quartet and orchestra
- 1942 Droomvuur, for mezzosoprano and orchestra - text: Pieter G. Buckinx
- 1942 Starkadd, for solo voices (tenor and bariton) and orchestra - text: A. Hegenscheidt
- 1944 Egmont, for soli and orchestra - text: Jos Van Rooy
- 1944 Egmont: Ouverture tot de slot-scène, for soli and orchestra - text: Jos Van Rooy
- 1945 Die enghelsche groete, for tenor or bariton solo and mixed choir
- 1945-1946 Goede lieve Sint Niklaas, children’s song for voice and piano
- 1946 Drie liederen op gedichten van Koos Schuur, for high voice and piano
- 1946-1947 Marialiedje, for voice and piano - text: van Albe
- 1947 De goddelijke jager, for Recitant, choir and orchestra - text: Frans Eykans
- 1951 Ik wil in den geest naar Bethleem gaan, for voice and piano
- 1956 L'eau passe, for high voice and orchestra - text: Maurice Carême
- Drinkliedeken, for high voice and orchestra - text: Willem Gijssels
- Herfstliederen, text: Scheltema
- Liederen "Uit vroegere tijden", for voice and orchestra
- Liederen, for voice and orchestra

=== Chamber music ===
- 1907 String Quartet No. 1 "Uit mijn Leven"
- 1916 Piano Quintet
- 1932 String Quartet No. 2
- 1933 String Quartet No. 3
- 1942 Suite for four trombones (or four cellos) in C
- 1953 String Quartet No. 5
- 1934 Aubade, for wind quintet
- 1950 Concerto No. 3, for violin and piano
- String Quartet No. 4

=== Works for organ ===
- 1915 Sonata, for grand organ
- 1943 Concerto, for organ and orchestra
- 1949 Symphony No. 1, for large organ
- 1949 Variations, for large organ
- 1949 Symphony No. 2, for large organ
- 1958 Concerto No. 2, for organ and orchestra
- 1959 Pièce héroïque
- 1959 Sei pezzi (6 Pieces)
- 1962 Concerto, for large organ, trumpet, horn and trombone
- Praeludium

=== Works for carillon ===
- 1949 Beiaardwerken
- 1950 Capriccio
- 1950 Serenata
- 1950 Suite voor beiaard
  1. Praeludium
  2. Lied
  3. Toccata
- 1950 Varieties op een Marialiedje van eigen compositie
- 1951 Drie dansen
  1. Allegretto
  2. Valzando
  3. Allegro ben ritmato
- 1955 De Kathedraal, diptych for carillon
  1. Maannacht
  2. Zondagmorgen in de zomer
- 1960 Alborada
- 1964 Toccata
- 1965 Concertino "In memoriam Staf Nees"

== Publications ==
- Arthur Meulemans: (Hulde Album) Arthur Meulemans. Antwerp. Arthur-Meulemans Fonds. 1964. 171 p.

== Sources ==
- L. Uten S.J.: De Litanie van Onze Lieve Vrouw. Huldealbum aan kunstenaar Alfred Ost en toondichter Arthur Meulemans bij hun zestigsten verjaring, Tielt. Drukkerij-Uitgeverij J. Lannoo. 1944.
- Diana von Volborth-Danys: CeBeDeM et ses compositeurs affilies: biographies, catalogues, discographie, Bruxelles: Centre belge de documentation musicale, 1977. Vol. I: A-L: 1977: 211 p.; Vol. II: M-Z: 1980: 276 p.
- Karel De Schrijver: Bibliografie der Belgische toonkunstenaars sedert 1800, Louvain: Vlaamse, 1958, 152 p.
- Henk Badings: Arthur Meulemans, Mens en melodie. 9 (1954), S. 109–112.
- Index to music necrology: 1966 necrology, Notes (Music Library Association), 1967, p. 708
- Aan Meester Arthur Meulemans bij zijn tachtigste verjaardag, Antwerp: Arthur-Meulemans-fonds 1965. 175 S.
- Wouter Paap: Arthur Meulemans 80 Jaar, Mens en Melodie. 19 (1964), S. 140–142.
- Music in Belgium: contemporary Belgian composers, Brussels: Manteau, 1964, 158 p.
- Tom Bouws, Jan van Mechelen: Arthur Meulemans, toondichter, Antwerp: Arthur Meulemans-fonds 1960. 20 S.
- Jozef Robijns, Miep Zijlstra: Algemene muziekencyclopedie, Harlem: De Haan, (1979)-1984, ISBN 978-90-228-4930-9
- Wolfgang Suppan, Armin Suppan: Das Neue Lexikon des Blasmusikwesens, 4. Auflage, Freiburg-Tiengen, Blasmusikverlag Schulz GmbH, 1994, ISBN 3-923058-07-1
- Paul E. Bierley, William H. Rehrig: The Heritage Encyclopedia of Band Music - Composers and Their Music, Westerville, Ohio: Integrity Press, 1991, ISBN 0-918048-08-7
- Jean-Marie Londeix: Musique pour saxophone, volume II: repertoire general des oeuvres et des ouvrages d'enseignement pour le saxophone, Cherry Hill: Roncorp Publications, 1985
- Jean-Marie Londeix: 125 ans de musique pour saxophone, Paris: Leduc, 1971
- Jeb H. Perry: Variety obits. An index to obituaries in Variety, 1905-1978, Metuchen, N.J.: Scarecrow Press, 1980, 311 p., ISBN 978-0-8108-1289-5
- Jacques Philip Malan: South African music encyclopedia, Cape Town: Oxford University Press, 1979
- Franz Stieger: Opernlexikon - Teil II: Komponisten. 1, Band A-F, Tutzing: Hans Schneider, 1975–1983, 371 p., ISBN 3-7952-0203-5
- Franz Stieger: Opernlexikon - Teil II: Komponisten. 2, Band G-M, Tutzing: Hans Schneider, 1975–1983, 373-772 p., ISBN 3-7952-0228-0
- Gösta Morin, Carl-Allan Moberg, Einar Sundström: Sohlmans musiklexikon - 2. rev. och utvidgade uppl., Stockholm: Sohlman Förlag, 1975–1979, 5 v.
- Frederick Ziervogel van der Merwe: Suid-Afrikaanse musiekbibliografie : 1787-1952, Kaapstad : Tafelberg-uitgewers vir die Instituut vir Taal, Lettere en Kuns, Raad vir Geesteswetenskaplike Navorsing, 1974. ISBN 978-0-624-00355-7
- Storm Bull: Index to biographies of contemporary composers, Vol. II, Metuchen, N.J.: Scarecrow Press, 1974, 567 p., ISBN 0-8108-0734-3
- Paul Frank, Burchard Bulling, Florian Noetzel, Helmut Rosner: Kurzgefasstes Tonkünstler Lexikon - Zweiter Teil: Ergänzungen und Erweiterungen seit 1937, 15. Aufl., Wilhelmshaven: Heinrichshofen, Band 1: A-K. 1974. ISBN 3-7959-0083-2; Band 2: L-Z. 1976. ISBN 3-7959-0087-5
- Marc Honneger: Dictionnaire de la musique, Paris: Bordas, 1970–76
- P. Townend: Who's who in music and musicians' international directory 1962, New York: Hafner Publishing Co., 1962, 331 p.
- Joaquín Pena, Higinio Anglés, Miguel Querol Gavalda: Diccionario de la Música LABOR, Barcelona: Editorial Labor, 1954, 2V, 2318P.
- Theodore Baker: Baker's biographical dictionary of musicians, Fourth edition revised and enlarged, New York: G. Schirmer, 1940
- Carlo Schmidl: Dizionario universale dei musicisti, Milan: Sonzogno, 1937, 2V p.
- Paul Frank, Wilhelm Altmann: Kurzgefasstes Tonkünstler Lexikon: für Musiker und Freunde der Musik, Regensburg: Gustave Bosse, 1936, 730 p.
