= Ludwig Schuncke =

German pianist and composer (1810–1834)

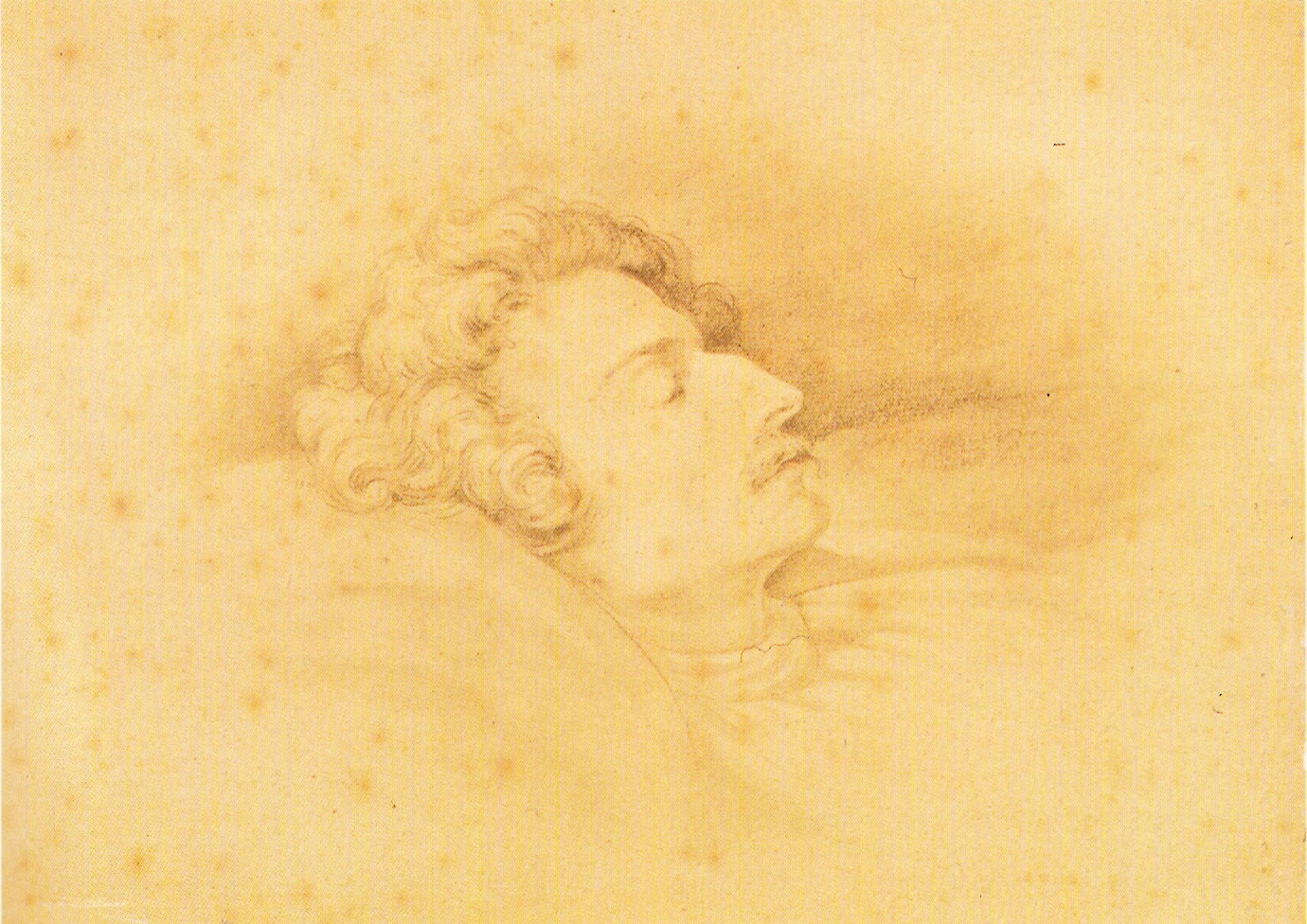
The only portrait of Ludwig Schuncke, done on his deathbed

Christian Ludwig Schuncke (21 December 1810 – 7 December 1834) was a German pianist and composer, and close friend of Robert Schumann. His early promise was eclipsed by his death from tuberculosis at the age of 23.

He was generally known as Ludwig, and that name also appears as Louis in some references. His surname appears as either Schuncke or Schunke.

== Biography ==
Ludwig Schuncke was born in Kassel in 1810. His father and first teacher Johann Gottfried Schuncke (1777–1840), and his uncle Johann Michael Schuncke (1778–1821), were both professional horn players.

He demonstrated his talents very early, and they were encouraged. In March 1822, aged only 11, he performed Johann Nepomuk Hummel's Piano Concerto in A minor, Op. 85, under the direction of Louis Spohr. He then went on a concert tour of Germany. Carl Maria von Weber expressed his approval of Schuncke's early compositions.

In 1828, he was one of the four pianists who played Henri Bertini's transcription of Beethoven's Seventh Symphony for eight hands, the others being Bertini himself, Franz Liszt and Wojciech Sowiński.

He went to Paris for study, where his main teachers were Friedrich Kalkbrenner, Anton Reicha and Henri Herz, and where he also had friendships with people such as Hector Berlioz, Sigismond Thalberg and Johann Peter Pixis. In Paris, he made his living by demonstrating Duport pianos, and he also lived in Duport's household. After completing his studies, he returned to Germany. In Stuttgart, he made the acquaintance of Frédéric Chopin after hearing him perform his Piano Concerto No. 1 in E minor. Schuncke dedicated his Caprice in C minor, Op.10, to Chopin. He then moved to Vienna, Prague and Dresden, appearing in concert, before finally settling in Leipzig in December 1833. He lived in a boarding house and his room was next door to that of Robert Schumann, whose very close friend he became. Schuncke was one of the co-founders of the Neue Zeitschrift für Musik, and one of its early contributors, under the pseudonym "Jonathan". He was also a member of Schumann's Davidsbund.

He appeared as soloist at the Leipzig Gewandhaus on 27 January 1834. In one article, Schumann favourably compared the playing of the emerging Franz Liszt to that of Ludwig Schuncke.

Schuncke dedicated his Grande Sonate in G minor, Op. 3, to Schumann, who greatly admired the work, and in turn dedicated his Toccata in C major, Op. 7, to Schuncke on its publication in 1834. In a letter dated 4 September 1834, Schumann wrote that his whole wealth could be summed up in three names: Henriette Voigt, Ernestine von Fricken and Ludwig Schuncke.

Schumann's Carnaval, Op. 9, had its origin in a set of variations on a Sehnsuchtswalzer by Franz Schubert. The catalyst for the variations may have been a work for piano and orchestra on the same theme by Schuncke (his Op. 14). Schumann felt that Schuncke's heroic treatment was an inappropriate reflection of the tender nature of the Schubert piece, so he set out to approach his variations in a more intimate way, for piano solo. He worked on the piece in 1833 and 1834. The work was never completed, however, but he did re-use the opening 24 measures for the opening of Carnaval.

Schuncke helped Schumann through his crisis of 1833–34, in which he had a serious depressive illness leading to a suicide attempt, and his brother and sister-in-law both died. Schumann in turn nursed Schuncke through his own final illness. Ludwig Schuncke died on 7 December 1834, at age 23, of tuberculosis. He is buried in the Alter Johannisfriedhof in Leipzig. Schumann forever after kept Schuncke's death bed portrait in his own study, in a gallery of pictures hung above his piano.

== Schuncke's music ==
Although their approaches sometimes differed, Schuncke and Schumann influenced each other to a significant degree. This can be seen in the following example, where an excerpt from Schuncke's Grande Sonate in G minor could easily be played alongside an excerpt from Schumann's Piano Concerto in A minor.

Schumann: Piano Concerto Bars 402–405	Schuncke: Grande Sonate Bars 78–81

== Recordings ==
Jozef De Beenhouwer was the first to perform Schuncke's Grande Sonate in G minor, Op. 3, which has also been recorded by Mario Patuzzi, Gregor Weichert, Sylviane Deferne and Megumi Sano. (His name is shown on Patuzzi's, Weichert's, Deferne's and Sano's albums as "Christian L. Schunke", "Louis Schuncke" and "Ludwig Schunke" respectively.)

His song Gretchen am Spinnrad is also recorded.

Further recordings of Schuncke's piano works can be found on the following CDs: "Ludwig Schuncke- Piano Music", Tatiana Larionova, Brilliant Classics 94807, 2015 and "Early Piano Works", Ulrich Roman Murtfeld, audite 87.811, 2023

== Works ==
=== Piano solo ===
- Scherzo Capriccioso, Op. 1
- Variations sur une thème quasi Fantaisie brilliant original, in E♭ major, Op. 2
- Grande Sonata in G minor, Op. 3 (1832, dedicated to Robert Schumann)
- Fantasie brillante in E major, Op. 5
- Allegro Passionato in A minor, Op. 6
- Divertissement brilliant, Op. 7
- 1st Caprice in C major, Op. 9 (dedicated to Clara Wieck)
- 2nd Caprice in C minor, Op. 10 (dedicated to Frédéric Chopin)
- Rondeau brilliant in E♭ major, Op.11
- Divertissement brilliant sur des aires allemenades, in B♭ major, Op. 12
- 2 Pièces caractéristiques in B♭ minor and C minor, Op. 13
- Rondeau in D major, Op.15
- Air suisse varié
- Six Preludes
- Rondino précédé d'une Introduction
- Adagio and Rondo in G major
- Capriccio
- Due Divertimenti
- Fantasy
- Marcia funebre
- Six Preludes
- Rondino précédé d'une Introduction
- Variations VII
- Quick Waltz

=== Piano Duet ===
- Petit Rondeau in C major
- Rondo brilliant in G major
- Deux Pièces caractéristiques pour piano à quatre mains, Op.13 (published 1834):
  - No. 1 in B minor, Andante con moto
  - No. 2 in C minor, Presto

=== Piano and orchestra ===
- Variations brillantes sur la Sehnsuchtswalzer of Franz Schubert in A♭ major, Op. 14
- Piano Concerto (lost)

=== Chamber music ===
- Duo Concertante for piano and horn
- Petites variations for piano and violin in C major

=== Vocal works ===
- Mother's love
- With golden string full of sounds, 3 voices and piano
- The slumbering love
- Four Songs
1. Spring song
2. The young man at the brook
3. The child's wish
4. Gretchen's song
- Seven Songs
1. Lullaby
2. Song of the Shepherdess
3. Craving
4. The Bethe ends
5. First Loss
6. Erlkönig
7. Farewell
- Five songs, Op. 8
1. Gretchen's song
2. The expectation
3. The arbor
4. I want to tell you well
5. The young man at the stream
