= Robert Herberigs =

Painter and writer (1886–1974)

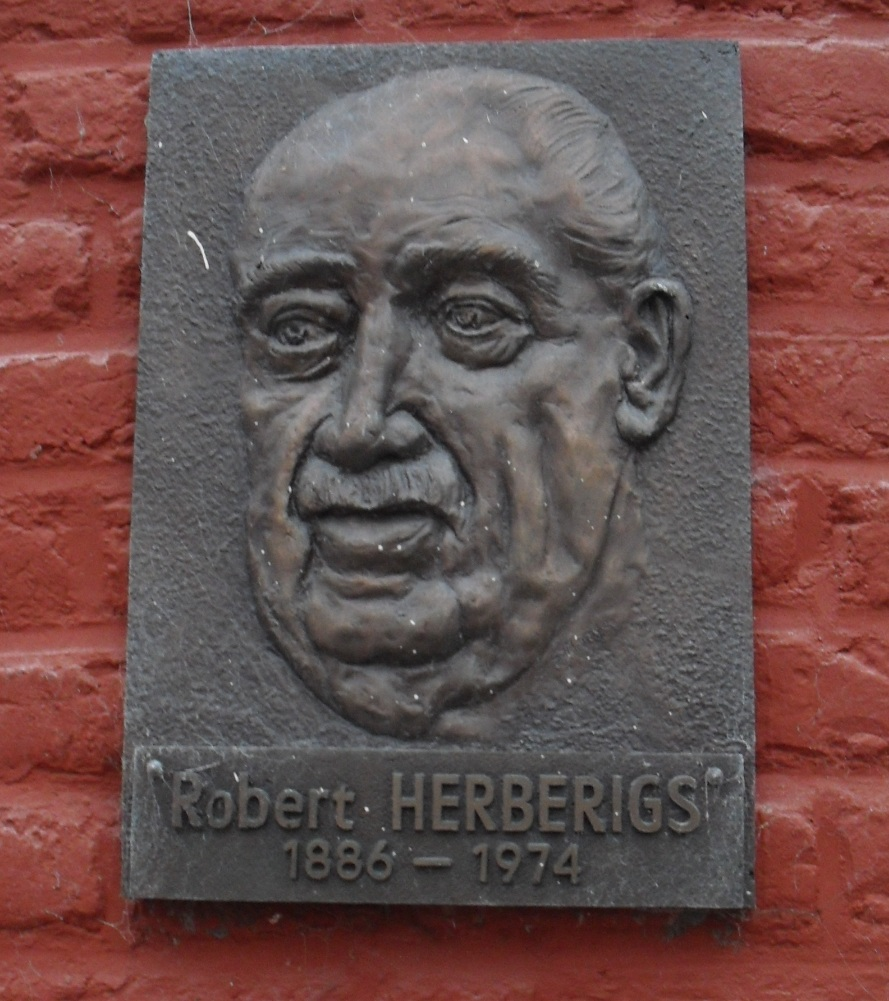
Memorial of Robert Herberigs at Elsegem

Robert Herberigs (9 June 1886 in Ghent – 20 September 1974 in Oudenaarde) was a Belgian painter, writer and musician.

== Biography ==
Herberigs studied at the Royal Conservatory of Ghent with Oscar Roels and Léon Van der Haeghen. He also enjoyed private lessons from Leo Moeremans to prepare for the Prix de Rome, which he won in 1909 with his cantata De legende van Sint Hubertus. The grant he gained by winning allowed him to travel through Paris, Berlin, and Vienna to further his studies. During the First World War Herberigs stayed at Jan Toorop's house in Domburg in the Netherlands. The Second World War was spent at his castle-farm in the Rhone valley. From 1951 to 1953 he directed the Royal Flemish Opera in Antwerp (Koninklijke Vlaamse Opera). In 1963 he was recognized with the Peter Benoit prize.

== Works ==
His best known works are the symphonic poem Cyrano de Bergerac for horn and orchestra, and the musical comedy Le mariage de Rosine. The period 1920-1945 was his most prolific, in which he mainly wrote piano music, songs and chamber music. Afterwards, he resumed writing for orchestra. His works are fundamentally traditional, although a certain influence can be seen from the musical developments that came to be at the beginning of the 20th century.

While Herberigs is mainly known for his music, he also wrote a couple of plays and about 10 historical and popular novels. He produced some 100 paintings, including landscapes and, later on, abstract imaginative works.
