= Frans Krafft =

Frans (or François, Francesco, Franciscus) Krafft (17 February 1729 in Brussels – 13 January 1795 in Ghent) was a composer, organist and director in the Austrian Netherlands (the current Belgium). He was organist at the Saint Bavo Cathedral in Ghent from 1769 to 1794. He is sometimes erroneously named Frans-Joseph, but that is actually his elder brother, born in 1721. He is not to be confused with his cousin, also named Frans Krafft and also born in Brussels in 1733, who later moved to Germany.

== Biography ==
Little is known of his life. His father, Jan-Laurens Krafft, was a poet, writer, music publisher and composer of German descent. Frans Krafft was active as a musician and printer in Brussels from 1747 onwards. He may have studied composition under Francesco Durante in Italy, where he won a prize with the motet In convertendo. L'Echo, a music magazine from Liège, published some thirty arias by him between 1758 and 1769, two of which from his opera Le faux astrologue – in 1763 performed in Dutch as Den valschen Astrologant. He is mentioned from 1761 to 1768 as composer, organist and keyboard teacher in the Brussels Almanach nouveau – ou Le guide fidèle. On 7 April 1769 he is appointed organist to the Saint Bavo Cathedral in Ghent, a post he held until 23 August 1794, a few months before his death. At the time of this appointment, he was already well reputed in the Netherlands, with main works performed in churches of major towns like Kortrijk and Leuven.

== Works ==
- Opera Le faux astrologue or Den valschen Astrologant (1763)
- 3 Motetta
  - Eripe me (a minor, for soprano and strings),
  - Ecce Panis (G major, for soloist, mixed choir and organ),
  - Benedicamus Domino (C major, mixed choir).
- 7 Antiphonae pro tempore Adventus, 1793, g minor, mixed choir and organ.
  - O Sapientia
  - O Adonai
  - O Radix Jesse
  - O Clavis David
  - O Oriens
  - O Rex Gentium
  - O Emmanuel
- Psalmmotetten
  - De Profundis
  - Levavi oculos meos
- Bavonem socio (Hymn for the feast of Saint Bavo) (d minor, mixed choir and basso continuo).
- Et vos beata (Hymn for All Saints) (D major, mixed choir and basso continuo).
- Jesu redemptor omnium (Hymn for Christmas Eve) (C major, mixed choir and basso continuo)
- 7 keyboard pieces for organ or cembalo (of which 3 unfinished), 1766
- 3 Magnificats (C maj., F maj., G maj., mixed choir and organ)
- Mis in F (mixed choir, organ and serpent)
- Missa a tre canti primae classis, (3 soloists, mixed choir and basso continuo).
- Missa di Requiem (E flat maj., mixed choir and organ), 1765
- Missa in Sabbato Sancto (G major, mixed choir and organ)
- Mis in g klein (mixed choir and organ)
- Motet Beatus Vir, (D maj., four soloist, mixed choir and orchestra)
- A Solis Ortu (only soprano part subsists)
- Super flumina Babylonis (g min., for soloists, mixed choir, strings and basso continuo)
- Tu lumen et splendor (Hymn for Christmas Eve) (D maj., mixed choir and organ)
- Motet in exitu Israel

The 20th century Flemish composer Herman Roelstraete has revised, reconstructed, edited and published many of Krafft's works.

== General references ==
- Raspé, Paul (2001). "Krafft, François". Grove Music Online (8th ed.). Oxford University Press. ISBN 978-1-56159-263-0. (subscription, Wikilibrary access, or UK public library membership required) Full access available to users of The Wikipedia Library.
