= Gustave Huberti =

Flemish composer

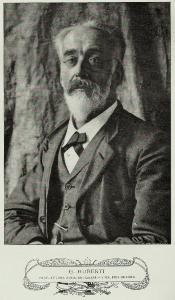
Gustave Huberti

Gustave Huberti (14 April 1843 in Brussels – 28 June 1910 in Schaerbeek) was a Flemish composer. He studied at the Royal Conservatory of Brussels where he won prizes for piano, organ, harmony and chamber music in 1858. He won the prestigious Belgian Prix de Rome in 1865 with this cantata La fille de Jephté, which allowed him to travel through Italy and Germany for three years. During his career, he worked as a composer, a music critic, a teacher, an inspector of music education of the state schools of Antwerp, and as a director. He led the musical academies of Mons and Saint-Josse-ten-Noode, and taught harmony at the Brussels Conservatory. He also directed the Grisar-choir and was part of the musical organisation of the World's Fair of 1885.

Around the year 1876, Huberti became principal conductor at the Grand Théâtre in Ghent and was appointed as professor of harmony and counterpoint at the Royal Conservatoire of Antwerp. In 1884 he was made director of the Ghent Opera.

Despite his Walloon roots, Huberti was a supporter of Peter Benoit and the Flemish school. His oeuvre contains oratoria, songs, choir works, piano music, and compositions aimed at children. Huberti was a big admirer of Robert Schumann, Hector Berlioz, and especially Richard Wagner.
