= Ernest van der Eyken =

Belgian composer, conductor, and violist (1913–2010)

Ernest Jozef Leo van der Eyken (23 July 1913 in Antwerp – 6 February 2010 in Brussels) was a Belgian composer, conductor and violist.

Van der Eyken received his first musical training at the age of five at the Music Academy in Sint-Truiden. At the age of seven he joined the music theory class of Karel Candael at the Royal Music Conservatory in Antwerp. In 1930 he obtained his first degree under Jan Broeckx, and in 1931, a further degree in viola studying with Napoleon Distelmans. Further studies at the Antwerp Conservatory were chamber music with Albert van de Vijver, conducting with Lodewijk De Vocht, harmony with Emile-Constant Verres and Edward Verheyden. Van der Eyken also studied counterpoint and fugue with August de Boeck, instrumentation with Paul Gilson, and during World War II went to Salzburg, Austria to study conducting with Clemens Krauss and Joseph Marx at the International Conducting School.

In 1930 Van der Eyken made his debut as a violist with the Groot Symfonie-Orkest van de Wereldtentoonstelling 1930 (Grand Symphony Orchestra of the 1930 World Exposition) in Antwerp. Thereafter, he played in orchestras and chamber music ensembles of Antwerp: Orkest van de Koninklijke Vlaamse Opera (Orchestra of the Royal Flemish Opera), Nieuwe Concerten and Orkest van de Dierentuinconcerten. Between 1942 and 1944, he was assistant conductor of the Koninklijke Vlaamse Opera (Royal Flemish Opera). From 1952 and 1970, he taught violin and chamber music at the Music Academy in Ekeren.

He founded the Philharmonisch Kamerorkest (Philharmonic Chamber Orchestra) in Antwerp was also the conductor. In the 1960s he was music editor responsible for music programs of the Flemish Radio and Television Network. Furthermore, he conducted the Jeugd en muziek-orkest (Youth and Music Orchestra) of Antwerp from 1963 to 1976 and served as guest conductor of the Philharmonic of Antwerp and the Orchestra of the Flemish Radio and Television Network. In 1977 he joined the Royal Academies for Science and the Arts of Belgium.

Van der Eyken's œuvre consists of approximately 120 works, his style largely influenced by Flemish post-romanticism and the first wave of modernism of the 20th century.

== Selected works ==
Stage

- Elckerlic, Opera (1963–1966); libretto by Luc Vilsen

Orchestral

- Overtura buffa for chamber orchestra (1936)
- Poëma for string orchestra (1937)
- Refereynen ende Liedekens (Refrains and Songs) for string orchestra (1964)
- Salmodia accorata for chamber orchestra (1966)
- Symfonie voor strijkorkest (Symphony for String Orchestra) (1967)
- Symphony No. 2 (1975)
- Elegie voor Bieke (Elegy for Bieke) for string orchestra (1983)

Band

- Refereynen ende Liedekens (Refrains and Songs) (1968)
- Ricordanza (1975)
- Twee Goya's (Two Goyas) (1990)

Concertante

- Concerto for piano and orchestra (1994)

Chamber music

- Vier gedichten van Guido Gezelle for narrator and string quartet (1937)
- Twee melodieën (2 Melodies) for viola and piano (1942)
- String Quartet No. 1 (1943)
- Refereynen ende Liedekens (Refrains and Songs) for woodwind quintet (1968, 2002)
- String Quartet No. 2 (1975)
- Ballata for violin, or viola, or cello, or double bass and piano (1981)
- Legende for violin and piano (1982)
- Trio for flute, violin and viola (1989)
- Saxofoonkwartet for 4 saxophones (1993)
- Sonata for viola solo (1996)
- Klarinettenkwartet for 4 clarinets (1997)
- String Quartet No. 3 (1997)
- Concerto per otto strumenti a vento (Concerto for Eight Wind Instruments) for flute, 2 oboes, 2 clarinets, 2 bassoons and horn (1999)

Organ

- Fuga (2000)

Piano

- Sonatine voor Sofie (Sonatina for Sofie) (1983)

Vocal

- Three Negro spirituals for medium voice and piano (1945)
- Allerzielen for soprano and piano
- Avondliedeke for soprano and piano
- De tuin van Catherine for mezzo-soprano and piano

Choral

- Three Negro spirituals for mixed chorus and piano (1945)
- De kinderen van de Soetewey for 3-part chorus and chamber ensemble

== Discography ==
- Music for String Orchestra by Ernest van der Eyken: In Flanders' Fields Vol. 18; Phaedra CD 92018 (1999)

Elegy for Bieke (1983)
Refereynen ende Liedekens (Refrains and Lieder), Suite of old-Flemish Songs (1964)
Poëma (1937)
Symphony for Strings (1967)

- Ernest van der Eyken: In Flanders' Fields Vol. 47; Phaedra CD 92047 (2006)

String Quartet No. 2 (1975)
Two Melodies for viola and piano (1942)
Trio per flauto, violino e viola (1989)
Sonatine voor Sofie (1983)
Concerto per otto strumenti a fiato (1999)
