= Marinus De Jong =

Belgian composer and pianist

Marinus de Jong (14 January 1891, Oosterhout - 13 July 1984, Ekeren) was a Belgian composer and pianist of Dutch origin.

== Biography ==
Marinus de Jong was born in Oosterhout (The Netherlands) to a working-class family with twelve children. His musical talent became apparent early in his life: he was accepted into the Royal Conservatoire of Antwerp (Belgium) at the age of fifteen, where he was taught by Lodewijk Mortelmans and Emile Bosquet. At the start of World War I De Jong returned to his native town to recover from a burn-out, but he returned to Belgium after the Armistice of 11 November 1918. He gained fame as a pianist and toured throughout Europe and the United States between 1920 and 1922. Afterwards he married Johanna Corthals, with whom he settled in Kapellenbos, and in 1926 De Jong traded in his Dutch nationality for a Belgian one. In this same year, he was made a teacher of counterpoint and fugue at the Lemmensinstituut, where he would work until 1963. In 1931 he was also appointed professor of piano at the Conservatory of Antwerp, where he became professor of counterpoint and fugue in 1948. In these teaching positions, he wrote two treaties on harmony and counterpoint, of which the latter remained unpublished. He died on 14 January 1991 in Ekeren.

== Music ==
Marinus de Jong is mostly remembered as a composer. He remained a very active author of music up until a high age. Therefore, his oeuvre contains more than 190 opus numbers. His music gives a prominent place to Gregorian chants, which are harmonised with a 20th-century chordal repertory. His music uses conventional forms and is characterised by a lyrical feeling and a sense of mystical reflection. His later works reveal a neo-impressionist style with polytonal counterpoint as a main technique. The oratorio Hiawatha’s Lied, opus 37 (1933-1947) is often cited as his magnum opus. It is a setting of a Dutch translation by Guido Gezelle of Henry Longfellow's The Song of Hiawatha.
