= Joseph Ryelandt =

Belgian composer (1870–1965)

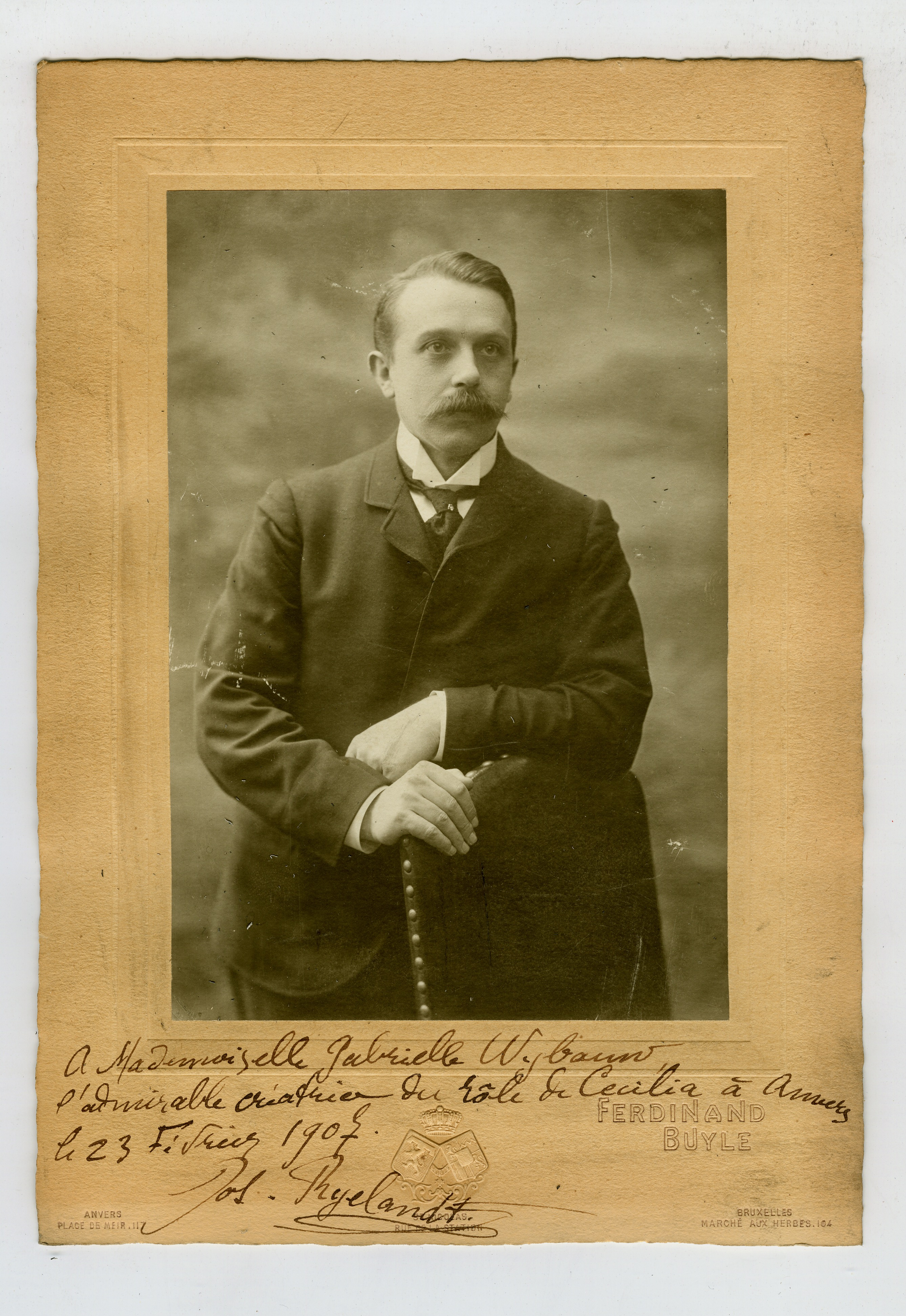
- Born: Joseph Victor Marie Ryelandt; 7 April 1870; Bruges
- Died: 29 June 1965 (aged 95); Bruges
- Occupations: Composer; Academic teacher
- Organization: Conservatory of Bruges

Joseph Ryelandt (7 April 1870 – 29 June 1965) was a Belgian classical composer. He is known for sacred vocal music, including several oratorios and masses. His oeuvre catalog, which lists 133 opus numbers, includes symphonies, masses, an opera, numerous works for piano solo, chamber works and songs, and also five oratorios, which Ryelandt himself considered his most important works.

== Life ==
Joseph Victor Marie Ryelandt was born in Bruges, into a wealthy bourgeois family, for whom culture, tradition, and the Roman Catholic religion mattered. So did music, which, like many such families, the Ryelandts practiced a lot. From his childhood on he enjoyed private lessons in piano and violin. He studied assiduously, up to 2½ hours per day, but he gave up the violin after a mere two years.

Even as an adolescent he realized that his real destiny was music. But at the insistence of his mother, he first went to college, to study philosophy and later law—his father, who had died when Joseph was only seven, had been a lawyer. While at university, however, he continued his musical activities, including composition, although he had had only a few lessons in harmony. Eventually he persuaded his mother to let him show some of his compositions to Edgar Tinel, at the time one of Belgium's most esteemed musicians. Tinel had never taken on private students (nor would he ever again), "but," he wrote, "I let myself be conquered because this young man will one day be someone. He played me a sonata of his. I was stupefied. He already is someone, but he has never studied. This fellow has written sonatas, trios, variations, duos …" His mother relented, and from 1891 to 1895 Joseph studied with Tinel.

After his study with Tinel, he was able to devote himself exclusively to composing, being of independent financial means. The years between 1895 and 1924 were his most productive.

World War I and the subsequent inflation in the 1920s badly affected his financial situation. In addition, he had a family to take care of, for in 1899 he had married Marguerite Carton de Wiart (1872–1939), and the children had come thick and fast, eight in all. He felt compelled to find a position, and in 1924 he was appointed director of the Municipal Conservatory of Bruges, a function that came with a teaching load. He assumed it with some hesitation, but he discovered that he enjoyed teaching, even "regret[ting] that I didn't enter the teaching profession until I was 54." He kept on composing, albeit at a slower rate. Also, he ceased composing oratorios, which he considered his major works, but that was at least as much due to the death of Charles Martens (1866–1921), the librettist or co-librettist of three of his oratorios and a number of his cantatas, the tireless propagandist of his music, his literary, philosophical and theological interlocutor, and above all his friend, whose name he never mentioned without preceding it with "my good friend" or similar expression.

His life was busy: he took on a counterpoint course at the Ghent Conservatory, he organized a highly successful concert series in his own conservatory, he was often asked to sit on juries of music examinations and competitions, he was involved in the Queen Elisabeth Musical Foundation, which organized the Eugène Ysaÿe Competition, etc. Many honors came his way. He was asked to compose the Te Deum for the centenary of the independence of Belgium; he was made a member of the Belgian Academy in 1937 and a baron in 1938. But his private life was saddened by the slow decline in health of his wife, who died in 1939.

World War II and the miseries and worries it entailed caused his composition to slow down still further: he wrote nothing at all in 1940– 42, and only a few chamber music works between 1943 and 1948, when he ceased composing altogether.

In 1942 the Bruges City Council asked Ryelandt, who was well past retirement age, to continue as director of the Municipal Conservatory of Bruges. On August 31, 1943 the City Council finally parted with "this upstanding artist", granted him the title of "honorary director", and drafted Renaat Veremans as his successor. But as all these decisions were taken while Bruges, like all of Belgium, was occupied by Germany, the post-war City Council reversed them and re-instated Ryelandt on September 30, 1944. Ryelandt soon asked to be allowed to retire again, and his request was granted. Ryelandt definitively retired, in due form and again as "honorary director", on April 1, 1945.

He devoted his retirement to literature, writing poetry (including a number of translations into French of his favorite Dutch-language poet Guido Gezelle) and reading classics, many with strong religious contents: the Bible, the complete works of Shakespeare, Joost van den Vondel and Paul Claudel, as well as Dante, Pascal, and Teresa of Ávila. He died aged 95, in his beloved Bruges and "without bothering anyone," as he had wished, after a brief illness.

== Character ==
From his writings and the testimony of all who knew him, Ryelandt appears first and foremost as a man with a great sense of duty. Duty towards God above all: he was a deeply religious man, who attended mass every week, who was knowledgeable about his religion, and who conceived of his music making as a religious duty. Duty towards his music: he was privileged in being able to devote himself exclusively to music, but he was highly conscious this was a privilege and worked very hard, both as a student of Tinel (who drove him hard) and as a composer. Towards his family: he was always extremely solicitous of his wife, but especially during her illness, when he would organize serenades for her as she could no longer attend concerts; he made time for his children, considering their education extremely important, and encouraging them; and he was "Bon-Papa Musique" for his grandchildren, for whom he played his Scènes Enfantines. Towards his students, whose work he corrected with respect instead of denigrating it, and who greatly appreciated his teaching qualities: "Even though he followed the classical method of teaching harmony and counterpoint …, you never had the impression that you were learning something boring," wrote one of them.

Another noticeable characteristic of Ryelandt was his modesty. Although he enjoyed hearing his works performed, he left it to others—especially his teacher Tinel and Charles Lamy (pen name of Charles Martens, meaning 'Charles, the friend [of Ryelandt]')—to make his works known. As he put it: "If God wants my work to be known one day, that will happen. If not, what does it matter? The task of the artist is to create, and that's it. Success is a luxury and a pleasure, it's not indispensable." He never bragged about the extra-musical honors that befell him. Sometimes he gently mocked them, like when, on being made Commander in the order of Leopold, he "complained" no one had told him whom to command. When he was very old, he told his daughter: "You must never call a priest or a doctor for me at night, not before 6 in the morning. Those folk need their sleep."

But he was not a dour man: he was sociable and had a sense of humor, from when he was a child—his mother mentions the occasional "crazy gaiety" of the young Joseph—until his old age, when he wrote a ditty in which the moon (la lune, feminine in French) scolds the indelicacy of the scientists trying to take pictures of her derrière (meaning both 'far side' and 'backside').

Finally, he had an independent streak: he was very much his own man. This appears most clearly in his ideas about music.

== Ideas about music ==
Even as a young boy, Ryelandt had a mind of his own. Much as he revered his "best piano teacher", Franz Devos (of the Ghent Conservatory) who gave him private lessons, he wrote that Devos "did not pay enough attention to technique, which left me unsatisfied." While he learned a lot from Tinel, whose technical mastery he greatly admired, he also let himself be influenced by Wagner, whom Tinel detested, and by French composers such as Franck, Fauré and Debussy, whereas Tinel was primarily German-oriented. But Ryelandt never belonged to any school or fashion; in fact, he despised fashion.

He considered it the task of the artist to create beauty. How the artist did this did not really matter. But originality was no virtue; personality was. Great music, like Beethoven's, is admired because the composer's personality shines through; Beethoven's daring originality is now only of historical interest. However, Ryelandt was highly critical of atonality, claiming that the modernists' "empty game of sound combinations brings us no interior enrichment at all," and that the value of works like Honegger's "unforgettable" Jeanne d'Arc au bûcher lay chiefly in their tonal passages.

Ryelandt held that in essence music was "a language sui generis which expresses a subconscious state of the soul: it begins where ordinary language stops." The beauty the artist must create "calls upon sensibility as much as upon intelligence, and, in the domain of music, mainly upon sensibility, without however excluding intelligence."

Ryelandt wrote a great deal of vocal and program music, and he often let himself be inspired by extra-musical stimuli. Yet his ideal was absolute music. But there was an ideal beyond that. For Ryelandt, music was a religious vocation. The following words from the preface to his Notices sur mes oeuvres sum up what really mattered to him: "I think … I can say that I have not been a useless servant of art. I have done what I could. The future will decide if anything of this work will survive me to the greater glory of God."

== Works ==
Ryelandt's output is greater than his last opus number, 133, or rather than the sum total of the 117 opus numbers he did not repudiate, would suggest. Ryelandt destroyed not only unpublished works, but even published ones, some by a prestigious house like Breitkopf & Härtel.

Easily accessible complete work lists can be found CeBeDeM and Oeuvre van Joseph baron Ryelandt; the one in Willem is also very informative.

The following lists only works mentioned in Ryelandt’s own Notices—their titles being given in Ryelandt’s spelling there—and is not meant to be complete.

=== Religious vocal music ===
Ryelandt's national and international reputation was made primarily by his five great oratorios, which were all performed in Belgium, and some also in The Netherlands, France, and Canada.

- Purgatorium, op. 39 (mostly composed in 1904), for soprano, choir and orchestra; text: a selection of Latin Psalm texts, made by Ryelandt himself.
- De Komst des Heeren (The Coming of the Lord), op. 45 (1906), an oratorio for Advent, for four soloists, double choir and orchestra; text: a selection of Dutch-language Bible texts, made by Ryelandt with the assistance of Charles Martens.
- Maria, op. 48 (1909), for four soloists, choir and orchestra; text by Charles Martens and Leo Goemans.
- Agnus Dei (Lamb of God), op. 56 (1913–1914), oratorio for several soloists, choir and orchestra; text originally in German, by Benedicta von Spiegel.
- Christus Rex (Christ the King), op. 79 (1922), for soloists, choir and orchestra; text by Charles Martens. Ryelandt later dedicated this work, which he considered his masterpiece, to Pope Pius XI, who established the Feast of Christ the King in 1925.

A true, full-fledged oratorio that he wrote but destroyed deserves explicit mention, De XIV stonden, literally 'The fourteen hours', meaning the fourteen Stations of the Cross, because it was set to a text written for the purpose by Guido Gezelle. Yet Ryelandt was unhappy with Gezelle's libretto, for Gezelle, "like many men of letters, understood nothing of music, even though he sometimes put a lot of it in his verse."

Ryelandt also wrote five masses, but destroyed the first. The four that remain are:

- Missa, op. 72 (1918) for mixed choir a cappella.
- Missa quator vocibus cum organo o,p. 84 (1925), for four-part choir and organ, dedicated to Jules Van Nuffel.
- Missa six vocibus, op. 111 (1934), for six-part choir a cappella.
- Missa pro defunctis, op. 127 (1939), for mixed choir a cappella, a brief Requiem mass composed in memory of his wife.

His religious vocal music further comprises seven cantatas, a Te Deum, a number of short motets, and two theatrical works, the mystery play La Parabole des Vierges 'The Parable of the Virgins' and the "musical drama" Sainte Cécile.

=== Symphonic music ===
Ryelandt wrote six symphonies but destroyed his first. In his day the remaining five were less successful than his oratorios (though they were all performed), but four of them are now available on CD. Ryelandt likewise destroyed the first of his overtures, Caïn, his opus 3. Three remain, as well as three orchestral preludes, a short orchestral suite, and three symphonic poems, a true one, Gethsemani, and two for voice and orchestra, Idylle mystique and La Noche Oscura, the latter an orchestration of a text based on Saint John of the Cross's eponymous poem.

=== Other ===
Ryelandt trained as a pianist until he was about 20; no wonder his piano output is vast. Froyen lists about forty compositions, including 12 piano sonatas—the fourth dedicated to Vincent d'Indy— and two sonatines, six nocturnes, two volumes of preludes, three suites, etc.

The piano is also prominent in a number of chamber music works: seven sonatas for violin and piano, three for cello and piano, and one each for viola, horn, oboe and clarinet plus piano, as well as two piano quintets and two piano trios. Ryelandt also composed four string quartets.

Ryelandt was a major composer of art songs, some 65 in all, to texts in French and Dutch. Most of the Dutch texts he set were by Guido Gezelle, who, notwithstanding their failed collaboration on the De XIV stonden oratorio, greatly inspired him. They are his best-known songs; it has even been claimed that they have acquired an international reputation, in spite of their Dutch texts.

== Discography ==
Discographies in Meuris, pp. 71–73 and here.

== Ryelandt and Bruges ==
- Whilst still alive, Ryelandt had a street named after him, the Baron Joseph Ryelandtstraat, in Bruges. Bruges also named the Joseph Ryelandtzaal after him, a late baroque church (1681–1684) converted into a 200-seat concert hall in the 1980s.
- The Municipal Conservatory of Bruges.possesses a painting of Ryelandt by Jef van de Fackere (1879–1946).
- Since 2018 the City Archives of Bruges house the Fonds Joseph Ryelandt. Its collection consists of documents that used to be in the library of the Bruges Municipal Conservatory and of documents, gifted by the Ryelandt family, that had been temporarily deposited in the library of the Royal Conservatory of Brussels. It comprises almost all Ryelandt's musical manuscripts as well as hundreds of letters, a diary, contracts, photos and many poems.
- To celebrate Ryelandt's 150th birthday on April 7, 2020, the Municipal Conservatory of Bruges planned a major Ryelandt Festival from March 7 through April 4, with numerous concerts of his music and other activities. The COVID-19 pandemic necessitated the postponement of some events and the cancellation of others. The exhibition on Ryelandt in the Arentshuis, likewise intended to celebrate Ryelandt’s birthday, had to be delayed but was prolonged until November 8.

== Ryelandt, "a Flemish artist"? ==
Ryelandt was educated and wrote his publications in French, but he had what he considered a second native language, Dutch. As he held music to be a language sui generis, as his vocal music is set to texts in a variety of languages (his oratorios to Latin, Dutch, German and French texts, and he had some English and Italian translations made), it is clear he aspired to be an international artist. Yet his reputation as a Flemish artist, which he has always had, is not undeserved. In his day it was unfashionable to consider Dutch a language on a par with, say, French or German. Ryelandt did consider it so (he disapproved of francophones who despised Dutch), and treated it so, in his compositions. And in a sense he acknowledged he was a Flemish artist, by accepting a representative function in the Christelijk Vlaams Kunstenaarsverbond 'Christian Flemish Artists' Organization', besides Constant Permeke and Stijn Streuvels.
