= Royal Conservatoire Antwerp =

Music college in Antwerp, Belgium

- Koninklijk Conservatorium Antwerpen (Dutch)
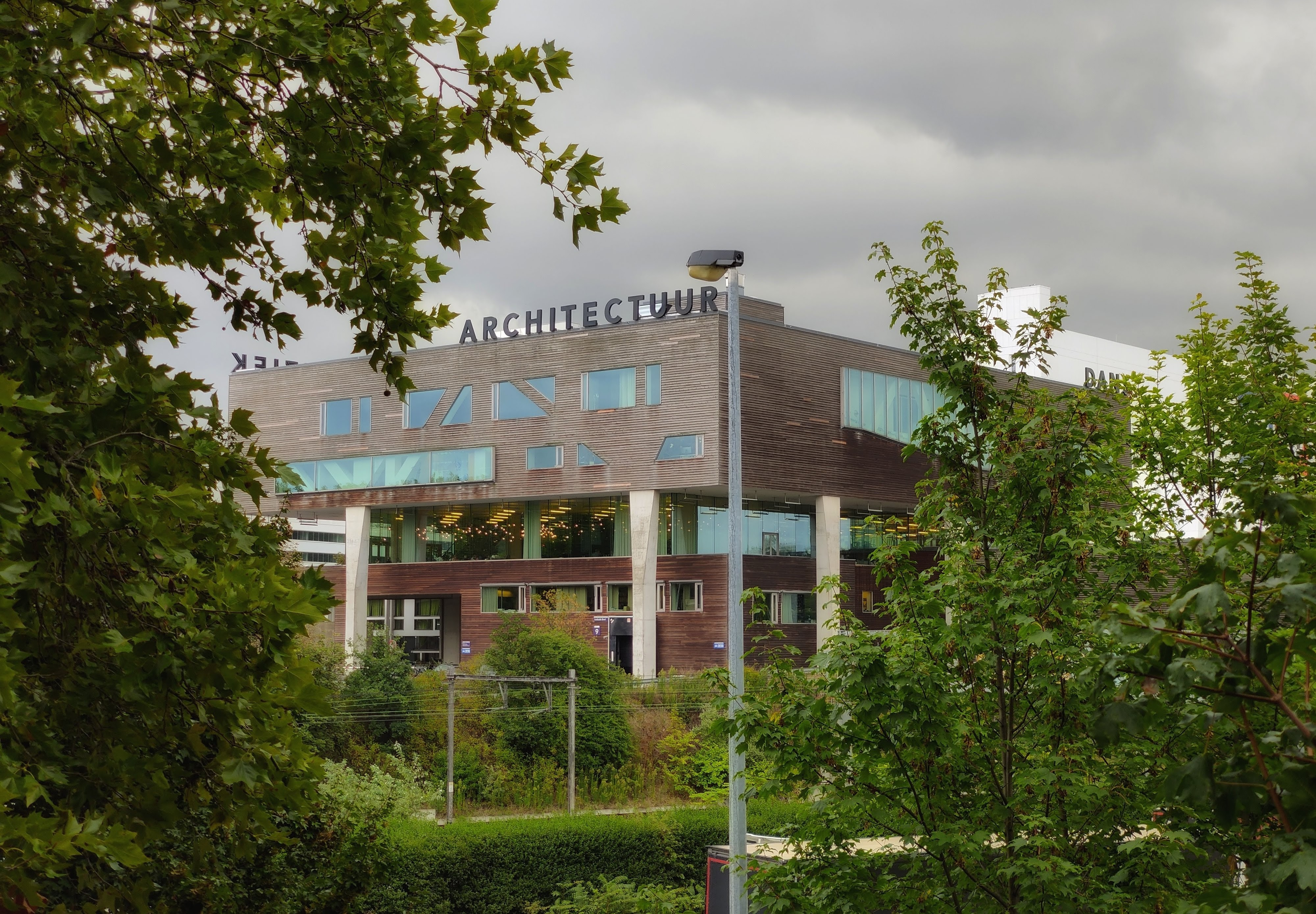
- Part of deSingel used by the Royal Conservatoire Antwerp
- Established: 1898
- Founder: Peter Benoit
- Parent institution: AP University College
- Dean: Piet Menu
- Location: Desguinlei 25, 2018 Antwerpen, (Belgium) Antwerp, Belgium
- Campus: deSingel
- Website: www.ap-arts.be/en/royal-conservatoire-antwerp

The Royal Conservatoire Antwerp (Dutch: Koninklijk Conservatorium Antwerpen) is a conservatory of music, dance and drama in Antwerp, Belgium. It was founded in 1898 as the Royal Flemish Conservatoire by the Flemish composer Peter Benoit.

The legislation on university colleges in Flanders in 1995 led to a merger under the wings of the newly formed Antwerp University College (Hogeschool Antwerpen) with the drama programme of the previous autonomous Studio Herman Teirlinck and the dance programme of the Higher Institute for Dance Education. In 2008, the university college assumed the name Artesis. Since October 2013, the Royal Conservatoire Antwerp is a School of Arts of the Artesis Plantijn University College of Antwerp, a merger between the Artesis University College Antwerp and the Plantijn University College.

The Royal Conservatoire has a music programme (bachelor's and master's in classical music and jazz), a drama programme (bachelor's and master's), a dance programme (bachelor's and master's) and a teaching qualification programme.

== History ==
In 1843 the Antwerp voice teachers Cornelius Schermers (1799–1870) and Frans Willem Aerts (1804–1864), composer and kapellmeister of the Antwerp Cathedral of Our Lady Jozef Bessems (1809–1892) and flute player J. Van den Bogaert (1802–1851) worked out a plan to set up a music school in Antwerp. They received the approval of the city council and on 15 March 1844 the Ecole spéciale de musique de la Ville d'Anvers was founded. Its classrooms were located in the center of Antwerp in a public property in the Kaasstraat near the Suikerrui. In 1859 they had to expand and they found additional classrooms in the Blindestraat. Until then, the music school was a private initiative, albeit with subsidies from the city. In 1859 the city took over the administration and the school was promoted to Municipal Music School of Antwerp (Dutch: Stedelijke muziekschool van Antwerpen, French: Ecole de Musique d'Anvers).

When Peter Benoit was asked to become director in 1867, he made it a condition that it would be a complete Flemish music school. This was accepted by the city council and the name of the school now was monolingual Antwerpsche Vlaamsche Muziekschool. Benoit also wanted space for a theater and a concert hall. In 1885–86 the school received its own building at the Sint Jacobsmarkt. Benoit made every possible effort to have the music school recognized as a Conservatory. In 1895, the City, the county and the state made an agreement whereby the state took over the music school in Antwerp to transform into a conservatory. Hair Thus, in Royal Decree of 15 June 1898, the Antwerpsche Vlaamsche Muziekschool was elevated to Royal Conservatory Antwerp. In this way the Antwerp Conservatory became the first institution of higher education in Belgium with Dutch as the official language. Its first director was Peter Benoit with Edward Keurvels as his secretary. The new conservatory complex would only come about in 1968 at the International Arts Campus deSingel.

== Management ==
Directors of the Conservatoire:

- 1867–1901 – Peter Benoit
- 1901–1912 – Jan Blockx
- 1912–1924 – Emile Wambach
  - 1914–1919 – Nicolaas Jan Cuperus, during the war temporarily replaced by Paul Gilson from August to November 1918
- 1924–1933 – Lodewijk Mortelmans
- 1933–1941 – Flor Alpaerts
- 1942–1944 – Jef Van Hoof
- 1944–1952 – Lodewijk De Vocht
- 1952–1968 – Flor Peeters
- 1968–1980 – Eugène Traey
- 1980–1991 – Kamiel Cooremans
- 1991–1995 – Michaël Scheck

Department heads: After accommodating the Conservatoire in the Artesis University of Applied Sciences, the management was entrusted to the head of the department:

- 1995–1997 – Michaël Scheck
- 1997–2001 – Herman Mariën
- 2001–2013 – Pascale de Groote

Heads School of Arts:

- 2013–2016 – Freddy Marien
- 2017–present – Stefaan De Ruyck

== Notable alumni ==
- Charles M. Courboin
- Jet Naessens
- Peter Verhoyen
