= Jef van Hoof =

Flemish composer (1886–1959)

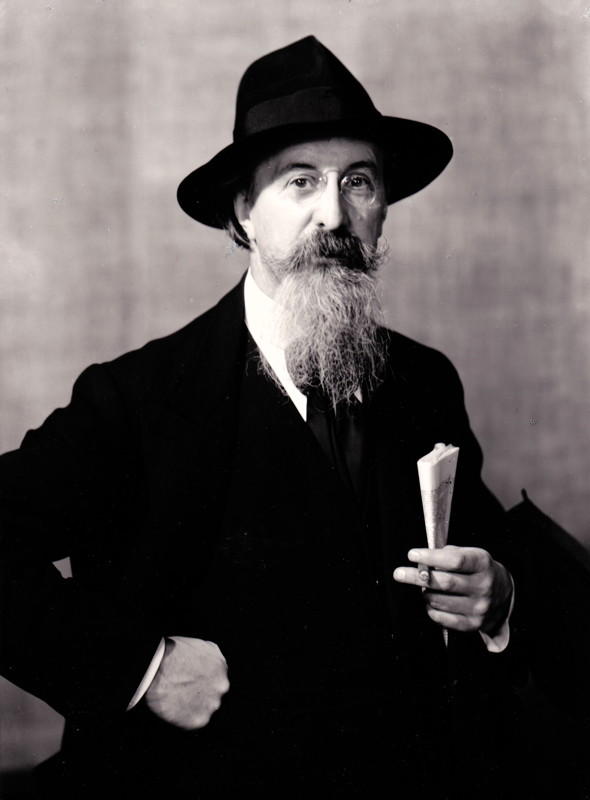
van Hoof in the 1940s

Jef van Hoof (8 May 1886 – 24 April 1959) was a Flemish composer and conductor.

== Biography ==
Born on 8 May 1886, in Antwerp, van Hoof was a pupil of Paul Gilson and was heavily influenced by the works of Peter Benoit. His dedication to the Flemish cause led him to collaborate with the German occupiers in World War I, for which he was subsequently sentenced to eight months in prison.

He studied at the Royal Conservatoire Antwerp, of which he was the director from 1942 to 1944. In 1933, he founded the Flemish National Song Festival (Vlaams Nationaal Zangfeest) where he worked as a conductor for many years. He also conducted concerts associated with the Flemish Movement. He died in Antwerp on 24 April 1959, aged 72.

He composed chamber music, symphonic works, art songs, works for solo piano, carillon, organ, as well as sacred music. He is particularly known for writing the Flemish patriotic song "Groeninge" to a text by Guido Gezelle.

== Works (Selection) ==
=== Symphonies ===
- Symphony No. 1 in A major (1938)
- Symphony No. 2 in A♭ major (1938)
- Symphony No. 3 in E♭ major (1945)
- Symphony No. 4 in B major (1950)
- Symphony No. 5 in E major (1955)
- Symphony No. 6 in B♭ major (1959)

=== Orchestral ===
- Perzeus, Concert Overture (1908)
- William the Silent, Concert Overture (1912)
- Meivuur, suite from the opera (1916)
- Remembrance Overture (1917)
- Symphonic Suite No. 1 (1918)
- Symphonic introduction to a festive occasion (1942)
- Symphonic Suite No. 2 (1952)

=== Concertante ===
- Sketch for Cello and Orchestra (1920)
- Divertimento For Trombone And Orchestra (1935)

=== Orchestral Songs ===
- A Mood of Spring for soprano and orchestra (1910)
- The Garland Has Been Hung (1913)
- Afternoon At Home (1946)
