= Arthur Verhoeven =

Belgian composer

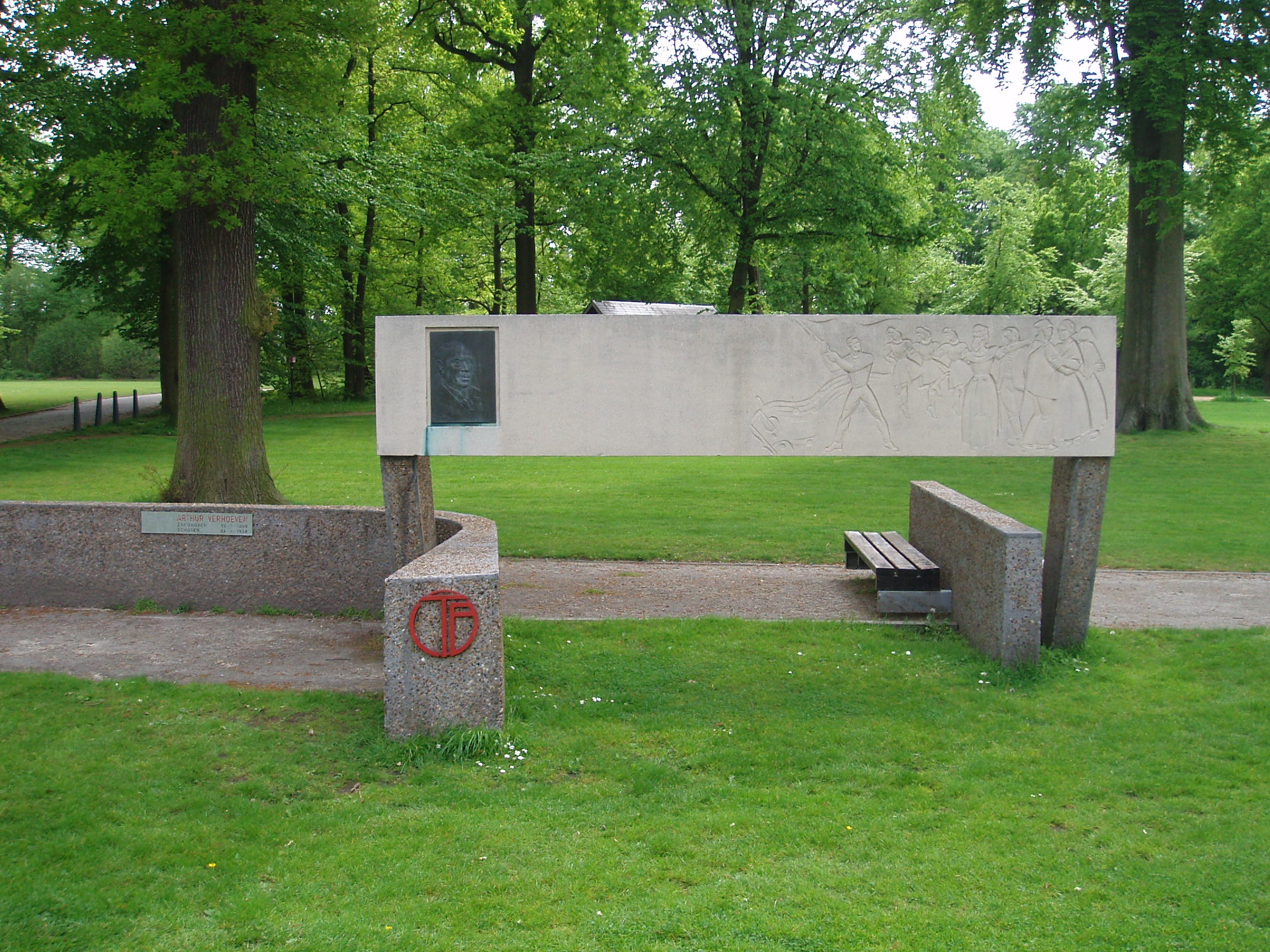

Arthur Hendrik Verhoeven (Zandhoven, 1889 - Schoten 1958) was a Flemish composer and organist. Arthur Verhoeven, a student of August de Boeck a Lodewijk Mortelmans, was a sacristan-organist at the Saint-Cordula church in Schoten. As a composer, his main period of activity took place between 1910 and 1930, the year in which he finished his opera Valentijn. After this period of time, he mainly limited himself to rearranging previous compositions.

Verhoeven is part of the many Flemish composers that were active during the first half of the 20th century, who modestly remained in the shadows despite the quality of their works. Verhoevens oeuvre mainly consists of compositions for organ and religious music. His musical career was honoured with a statue in Schoten and a street name bearing his name in the residential area De Kasteeldreef.
