= Peter Benoit =

Flemish composer (1834–1901)

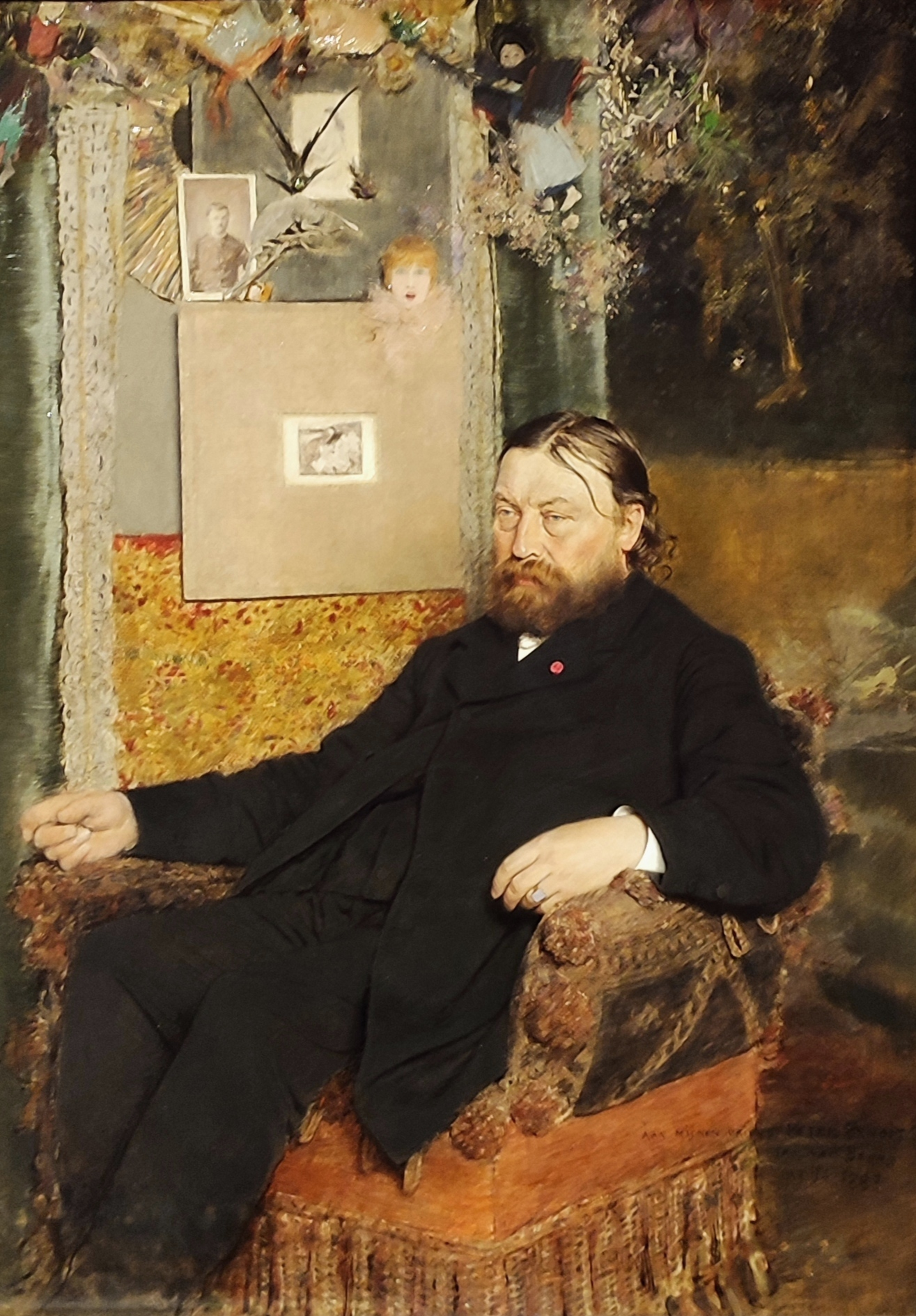
- Peter Benoit painted by Jan van Beers
- Born: Petrus Leonardus Leopoldus Benoit; 17 August 1834; Harelbeke, Flanders
- Died: 8 March 1901 (aged 66); Antwerp

Peter Benoit (17 August 1834 – 8 March 1901) was a Flemish composer from the kingdom of Belgium.

== Biography ==
Benoit was born in Harelbeke, West Flanders, Belgium in 1834. He was taught music at an early age by his father and the village organist. In 1851, Benoit entered the Brussels Conservatoire, where he remained till 1855, studying primarily with François-Joseph Fétis. During this period, he composed music to many melodramas, including the opera Le Village dans les montagnes for the Royal Park Theatre, of which he became the resident conductor in 1856. In 1857, he won the Belgian Prix de Rome for his cantata Le Meurtre d'Abel. The prize money enabled him to travel through Germany. In the course of his journeys, he found time to write a considerable amount of music, as well as an essay called L'École de musique flamande et son avenir.

Fétis loudly praised the Messe solennelle that Benoit composed in Brussels on his return from Germany. In 1861, Benoit visited Paris for the production of his opera Le Roi des Aulnes ("The Erl King"), which, though accepted by the Théâtre Lyrique, was never performed. He also composed a work for piano and orchestra called Le Roi des Aulnes. While in Paris, he conducted at the Théâtre des Bouffes Parisiens. Returning home in 1863, he astonished the musical community with the production in Antwerp of a sacred tetralogy, consisting of his Cantate de Noël, the above-mentioned Mass, a Te Deum and a Requiem, in which were embodied to a large extent his theories about Flemish music. At that time, he also came under the influence of the novelist Hendrik Conscience.

Benoit passionately pursued the founding of an entirely separate Flemish school, and to that purpose even changed his name from the French "Pierre" to the Dutch equivalent "Peter". Through prodigious effort, he succeeded in gathering a small group of enthusiasts who recognized with him the potential for a Flemish school that would differ completely from the French and German schools. However, these intentions failed, as the school's faith was tied too closely to Benoit's music, which was hardly more Flemish than it was French or German.

Benoit's most important compositions include the Flemish oratorios De Schelde (The river Scheldt) and Lucifer (which met complete failure when it was staged in London in 1888), the operas Het Dorp in 't Gebergte (The village in the mountains) and Isa, and the Drama Christi, a huge body of songs, choruses, small cantatas and motets. Benoit also wrote a great number of essays on musical matters.

He also composed a Flute Concerto (Symphonic Tale), Op. 43a, and a Piano Concerto (Symphonic Tale), Op. 43b.

He died in Antwerp on 8 March 1901, aged 66. In Harelbeke there is a museum commemorating his life and work, the Peter Benoit Huis.

== Honours ==
- 1881: Commander in the Order of Leopold.
- 1882: Member of the Royal Academy of Science, Letters and Fine Arts of Belgium.
