= Hendrik Frans Schaefels =

Belgian painter

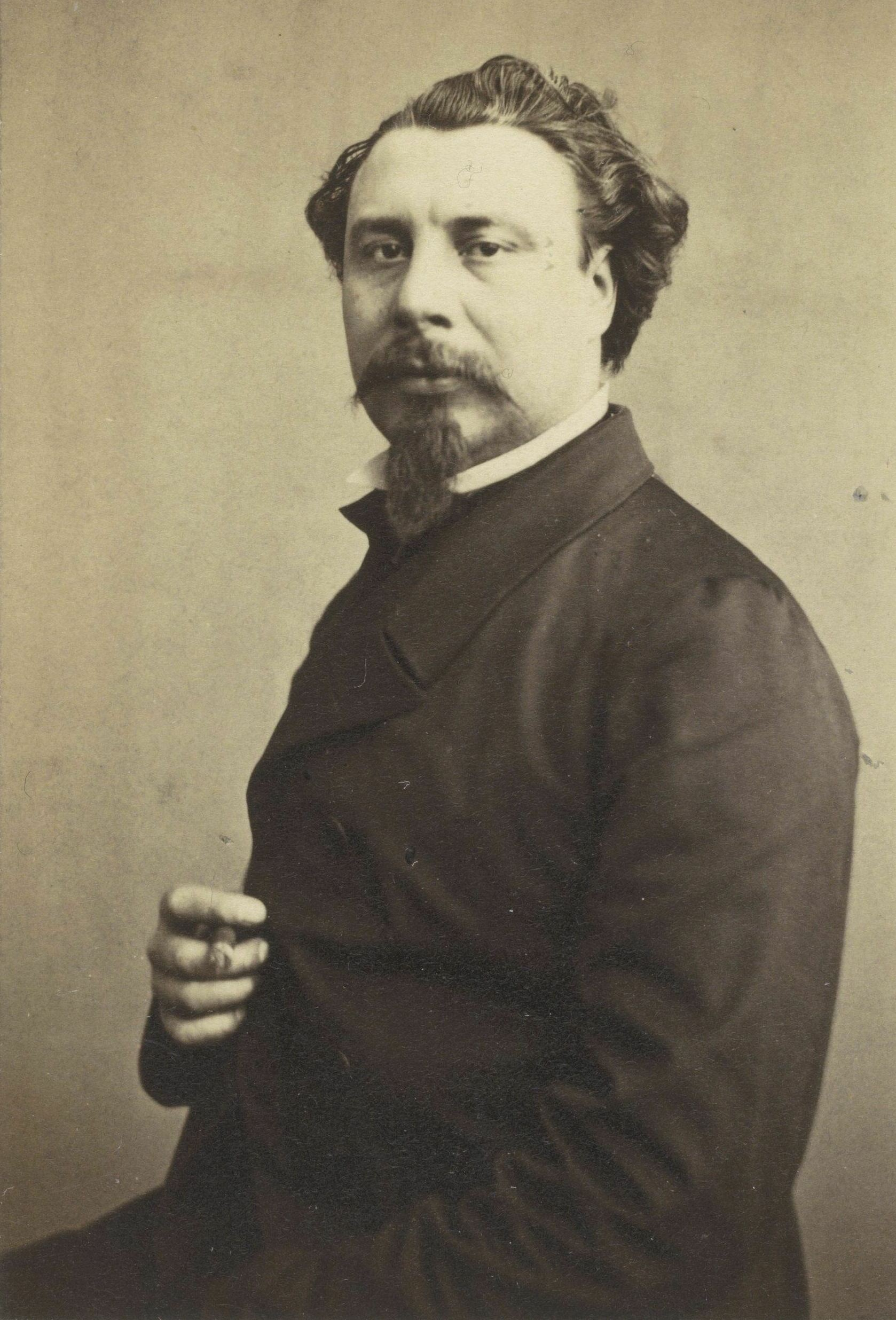
Portrait of Hendrik Frans Schaefels, c. 1865

Hendrik Frans Schaefels or Henri François Schaefels, also known as Rik Schaefels, baptismal name Henricus Franciscus Joannes Schaefels (Antwerp, 2 December 1827 – Antwerp, 9 June 1904), was a Belgian Romantic painter, draughtsman and engraver known for his seascapes, cityscapes, genre paintings, landscapes with figures and history paintings. He worked in the Romantic style popular in Belgium in the mid nineteenth century and was highly esteemed in Europe for his representations of historic naval battles.

== Life ==
Hendrik Frans Schaefels was the son of Hendrik Raphael Schaefels, a decorative painter working in a Neo-Classical style and a teacher of decorative design at the Antwerp Academy. His older brother Lucas Victor Schaefels (1824–1885) became a successful still life painter and draughtsman and a teacher at the Antwerp Academy.

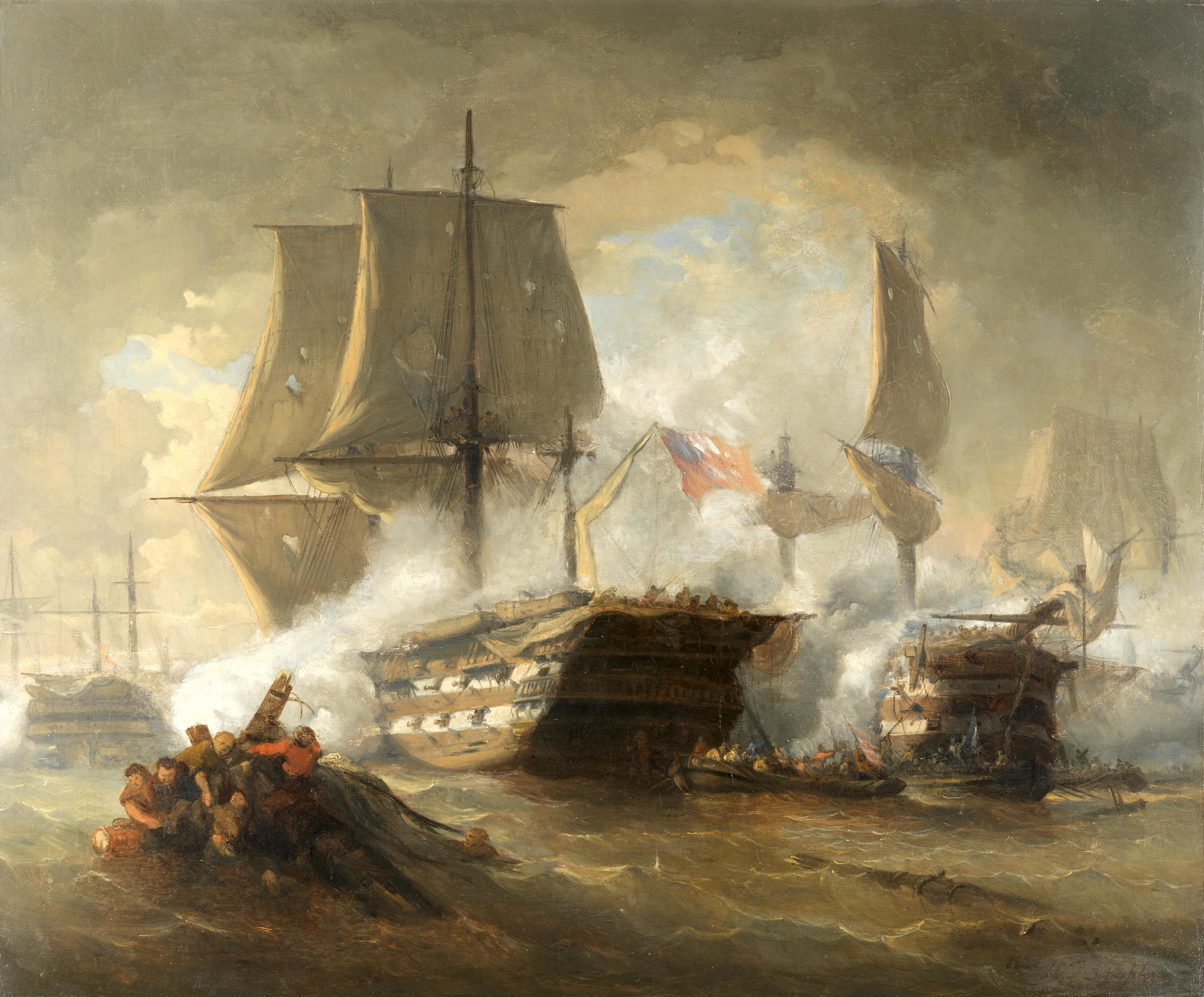
Naval battle

Hendrik Frans Schaefels began as a student at the Antwerp Academy of landscape painter Jan Baptiste de Jonghe and landscape and marine painter Jacob Jacobs. After leaving the academy he worked between his 15th and 17th year at the studio of Jan Michiel Ruyten, a painter of cityscapes. Ruyten's work would leave an important mark on Schaefels' own cityscapes. A seascape by Schaefel was accepted at the tri-annual salon of Antwerp when the artist was only 17 years old.

Schaefels spent his entire career in Antwerp. He was friends with leading Antwerp artists and intellectuals such as Hendrik Conscience, Jan Lambrecht Domien Sleeckx, Max Rooses, Frans Van Kuyck and Peter Benoit. Schaefels was a member of 'Artibus Patriae', an association which was founded in 1865 with the goal of supporting new acquisitions by the museums in Antwerp. He was for a time engaged in local politics for the Catholic Party. From 1869 to 1872 he sat on the Antwerp city council where he advocated for the interests of artists and art promotion in general.

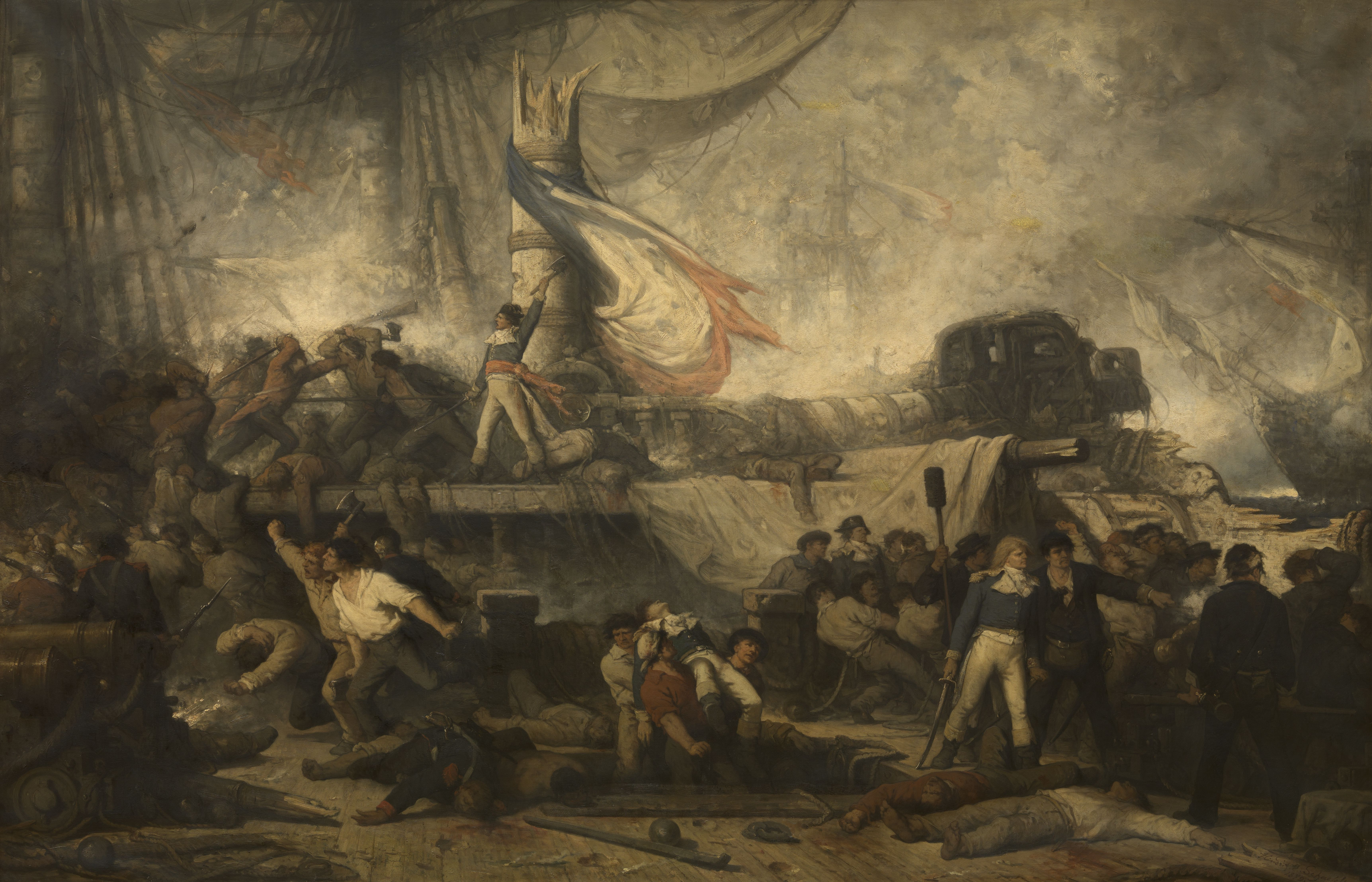
The Algeciras at the Battle of Trafalgar

== Work ==
=== General ===
Hendrik Frans Schaefels worked in many genres including history paintings, seascapes, genre paintings, landscapes with figures and cityscapes. His early work, which was influenced by Jan Michiel Ruyten, consisted mainly of cityscapes of Antwerp and genre scenes. He is now principally known for his seascapes often representing historical events such as sea battles and for his cityscapes of Antwerp.

=== Marine paintings ===
Belgium was in the grip of Romantic art at the time Schaefels started out on his artistic career. Belgian Romantic painters such as Gustaf Wappers, Nicaise de Keyser, Edouard Hamman and Louis Gallait gained international success with their history paintings. These usually depicted glorious or famous events in the history of what became the state of Belgium, which had only recently been established as an independent country in 1830. Such historic themes were the favorite subjects of artists working in the years from 1830 to 1850.

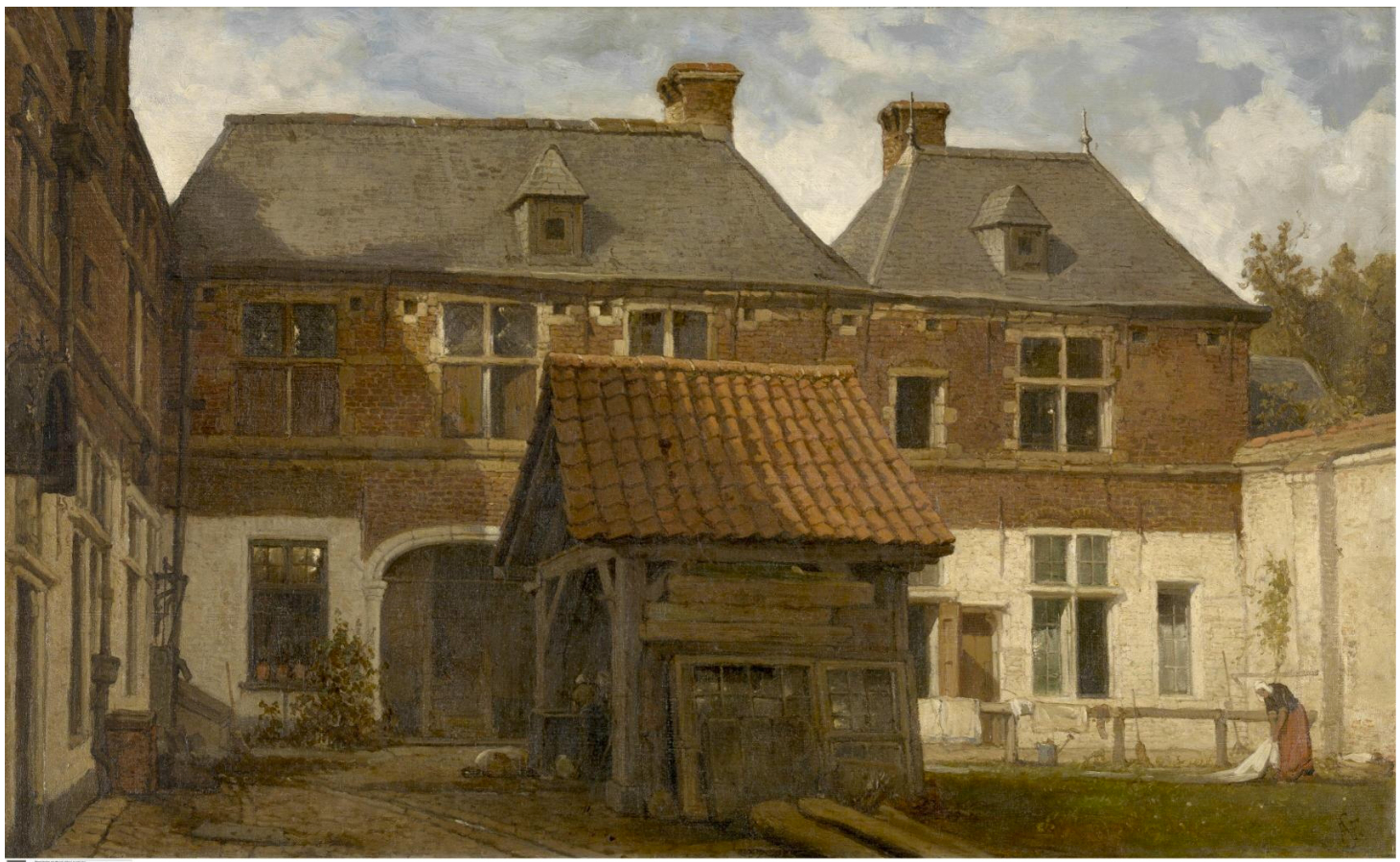
Sint-Annagodshuis in the Otto Veniusstraat

Hendrik Frans Schaefels combined in his work this tradition of history painting and marine art. He excelled in his dramatic portrayals of naval battles and other historical events that took place at sea such as the Battle of Trafalgar, episodes from the wars between England and the Dutch Republic. His large compositions, with sizes varying from 2 to 9 meters long, often showed a pseudo-Baroque design. Schaefels painted both compositions depicting an entire naval battle as well as more anecdotal episodes depicting the action on the deck of a single warship such as in the Death of Nelson. For his naval battles he relied on historical literature and printed materials.

Schaefels also painted more recent and peaceful marine events such as the Queen Victoria on board the Royal Yacht, which depicts the 1843 visit of Ostend by Queen Victoria with her husband Prince Albert.

=== Cityscapes and genre paintings ===
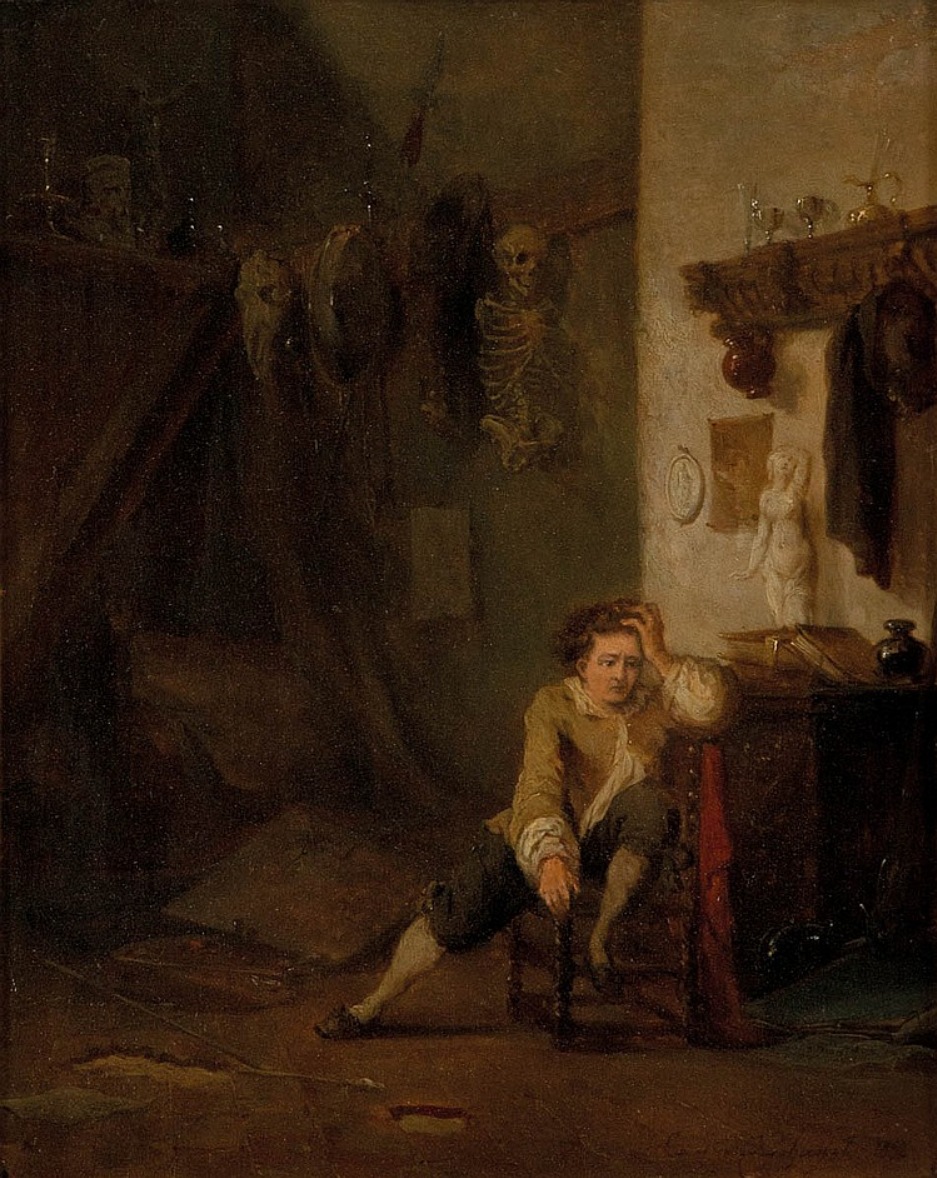
Artist who has lost his inspiration

Hendrik Frans Schaefels painted many views of the city of Antwerp which provide important documentary evidence on the city in the 19th century. These works showed the influence of his master Jan Michiel Ruyten. Like other Belgian Romantic painters such as Henri Leys and Nicaise De Keyser he drew inspiration from Goethe's Faust as seen in his Scene from Goethe's Faust (1863, auctioned at Dorotheum on 15 February 2011 in Vienna, lot 31). An interesting composition painted by Schaefels twice is The grave of Rubens and his family upon its opening in 1855. The composition shows Rubens' opened grave lit by candles and is thus at the same time a document of the event as well as an expression of Schaefels' Romantic veneration for the great Antwerp master Rubens.

Schaefles also painted in his early career a number of genre scenes such as Admiring the newborn (1857, auctioned at Christie's on 19–20 September 2006 in Amsterdam, lot 204).

=== Illustrations ===
Hendrik Frans Schaefels was in demand as a book illustrator and provided illustrations to various contemporary publications. He illustrated the 1854 collection of short stories entitled 'Dorpsverhalen' ("Village stories') by Flemish writer Jan Renier Snieders and was one of the illustrators of the novel 'De gasthuisnon: een verhael uit onzen tyd' ('The hospital nun: a story of our time') by August Snieders.

He was one of various Belgian graphic artists such as Adolf Dillens and Félicien Rops who provided illustrations to the second edition of 'The Legend of Thyl Ulenspiegel and Lamme Goedzak' published in Paris in 1869.

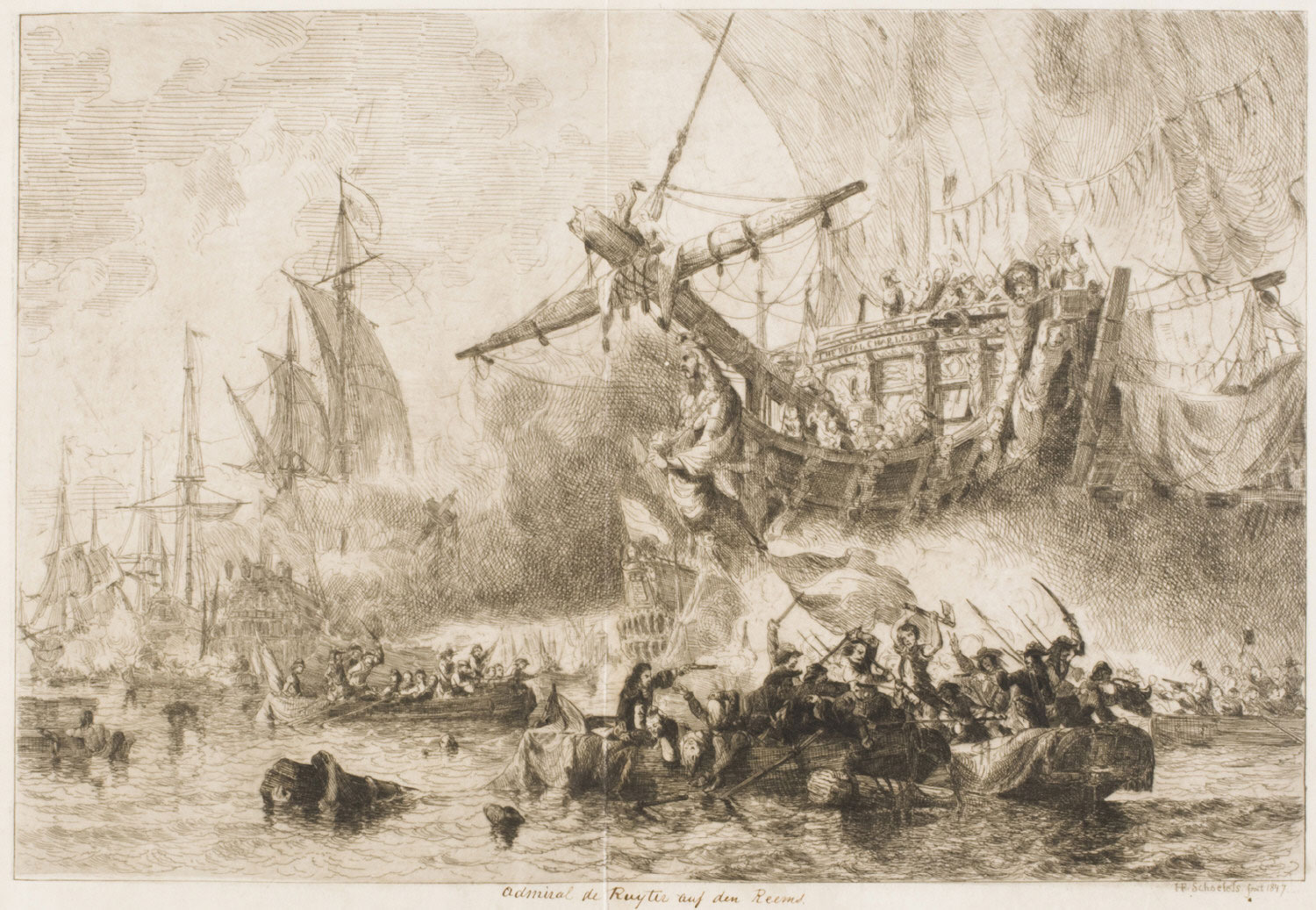
Admiral Ruyter on the river Thames

=== Drawings and graphic work ===
Hendrik Frans Schaefels made many drawings which served as studies for his paintings. He spent much of his time outdoors drawing the ships and activities in the port of Antwerp and houses and people in the streets of Antwerp. His drawings are careful and picturesque. His drawings include studies of all types of ships, cutters, shock cherry, clubs, people on the docks, the wharf, the dockyards and the first steamships such as the 'British Queen' and 'Baron Osy'. The drawings and the notes that Schaefels added to his drawings provide historical information on maritime and river transport of the time. A selection of his drawings are in the collection of the Plantin-Moretus Museum in Antwerp.

Schaefels was an avid engraver and his prints depict the same subjects as his drawings and are executed in a loose style.
