= Cornelius Van Leemputten =

Belgian painter (1841–1902)

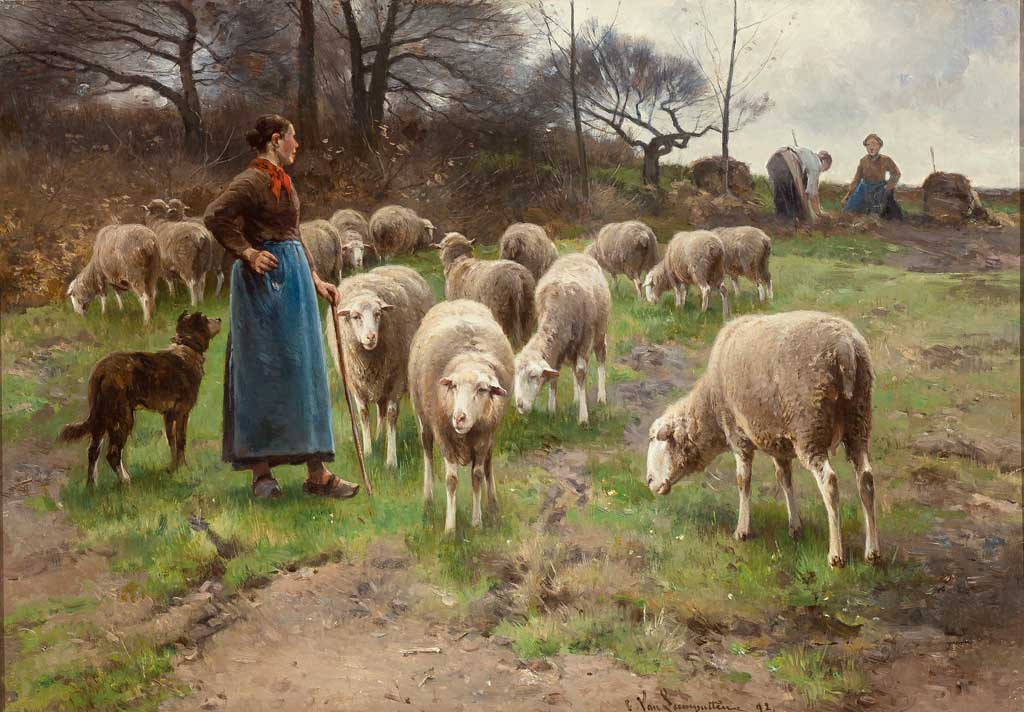
- Shepherdess with her flock grazing
- Born: 25 January 1841; Werchter
- Died: 24 November 1902 (aged 61); Schaerbeek
- Known for: Painting
- Parent(s): Jan Frans Van Leemputten and Elisabeth Hopland
- Relatives: Frans Van Leemputten (brother)

Cornelius Van Leemputten (1841–1902) was a Belgian painter known for his scenes of farmyard animals and landscapes with shepherds and grazing sheep.

== Life ==
Cornelius Van Leemputten was born in Werchter as the son of Jan Frans Van Leemputten and Elisabeth Hopland. His father was originally a farmer but moved to Brussels in 1852 to become a painting restorer as he had an interest and some practice in art. Cornelius and his younger brother Frans Van Leemputten were encouraged by their father to practise art.

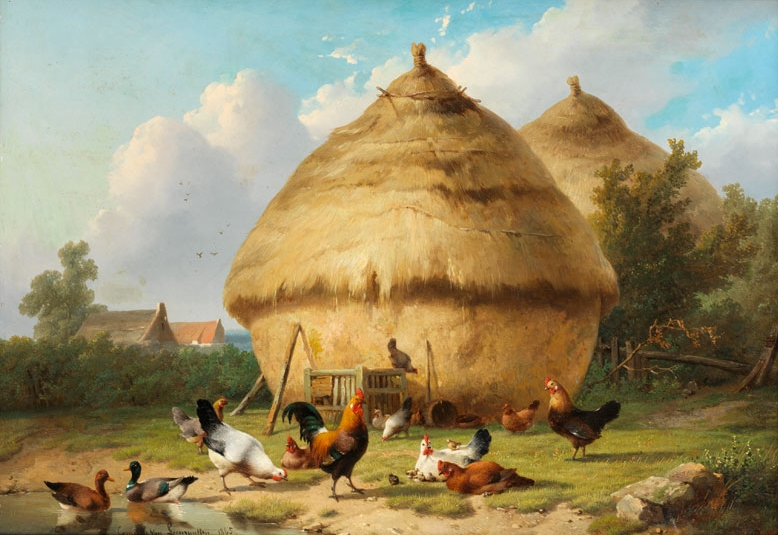
Straw heaps and poultry

With the exception of a few lessons from his father, Cornelius was principally self-taught through the making of studies from nature in areas such as Brabant and the Campine region in north-eastern Belgium. In 1855 the family briefly moved to Antwerp where Cornelius attended classes at the Antwerp Academy from 1855 to 1860.

== Exhibitions ==
Van Leemputten participated in several international exhibitions and received gold medals in Ghent in 1883, Edinburgh in 1886, Port Adelaide in 1887 and in Berlin in 1896. He was awarded silver medals in Nice, Melbourne, Barcelona and Cologne. He was made a Knight of the Order of Leopold by the Belgian king in 1895.

== Work ==
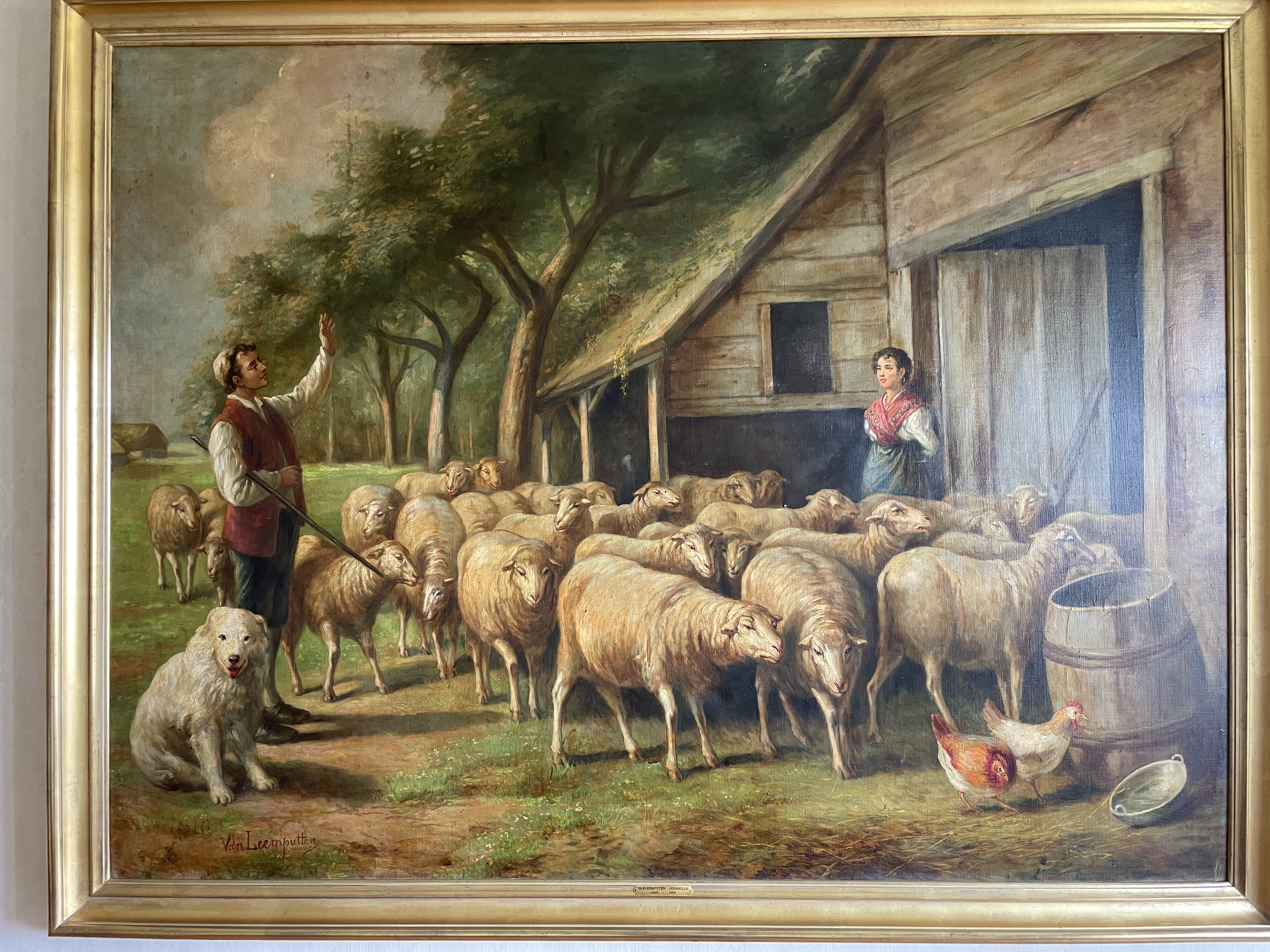
Sheep return from the pasture

Cornelius van Leemputten is predominantly known for his landscapes with sheep, similar in style to those of Charles Jacque. He was well known for his barnyard subjects. He was also influenced by the Romantic scenes with cattle by the Belgian artist Eugène Joseph Verboeckhoven, which he reinterpreted in a more realistic manner. His compositions often depict, with small variations, the Belgian flat countryside with low horizon, vegetation and water surfaces in the foreground and miniature figures.

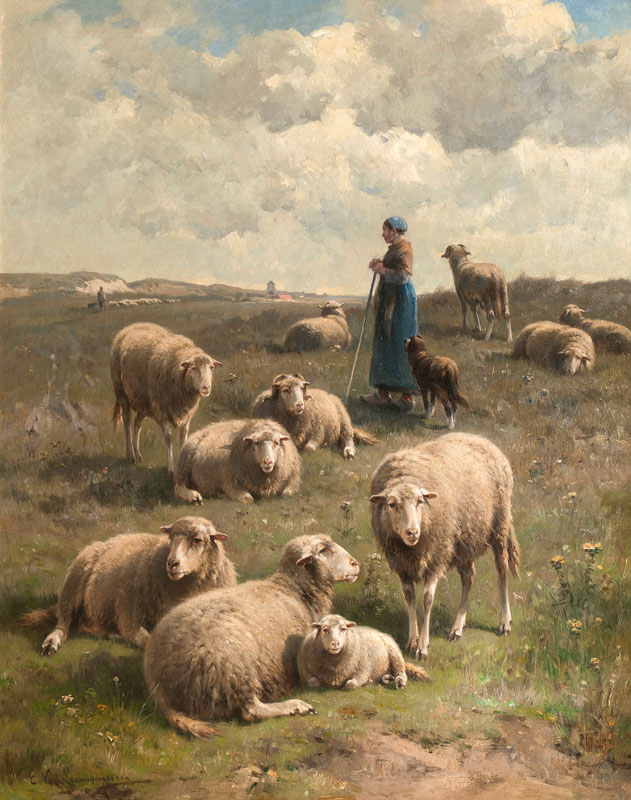
Sheep in the dunes

Partially as a reaction to the Industrial Revolution, the depiction of farm animals and pastoral scenes gained popularity in the nineteenth century. The simple, rural subjects perhaps evoked nostalgia in the richer city populations of the time. The seventeenth-century artist Paulus Potter was an influence for many of the artists of this period, including Van Leemputten.

Van Leemputten produced a substantial body of work that was distributed in both local and international markets.

== Sources ==
- P. & V. Berko, "Dictionary of Belgian painters born between 1750 & 1875", Knokke 1981, pp. 703–704.
