= Frans Van Leemputten =

Belgian painter

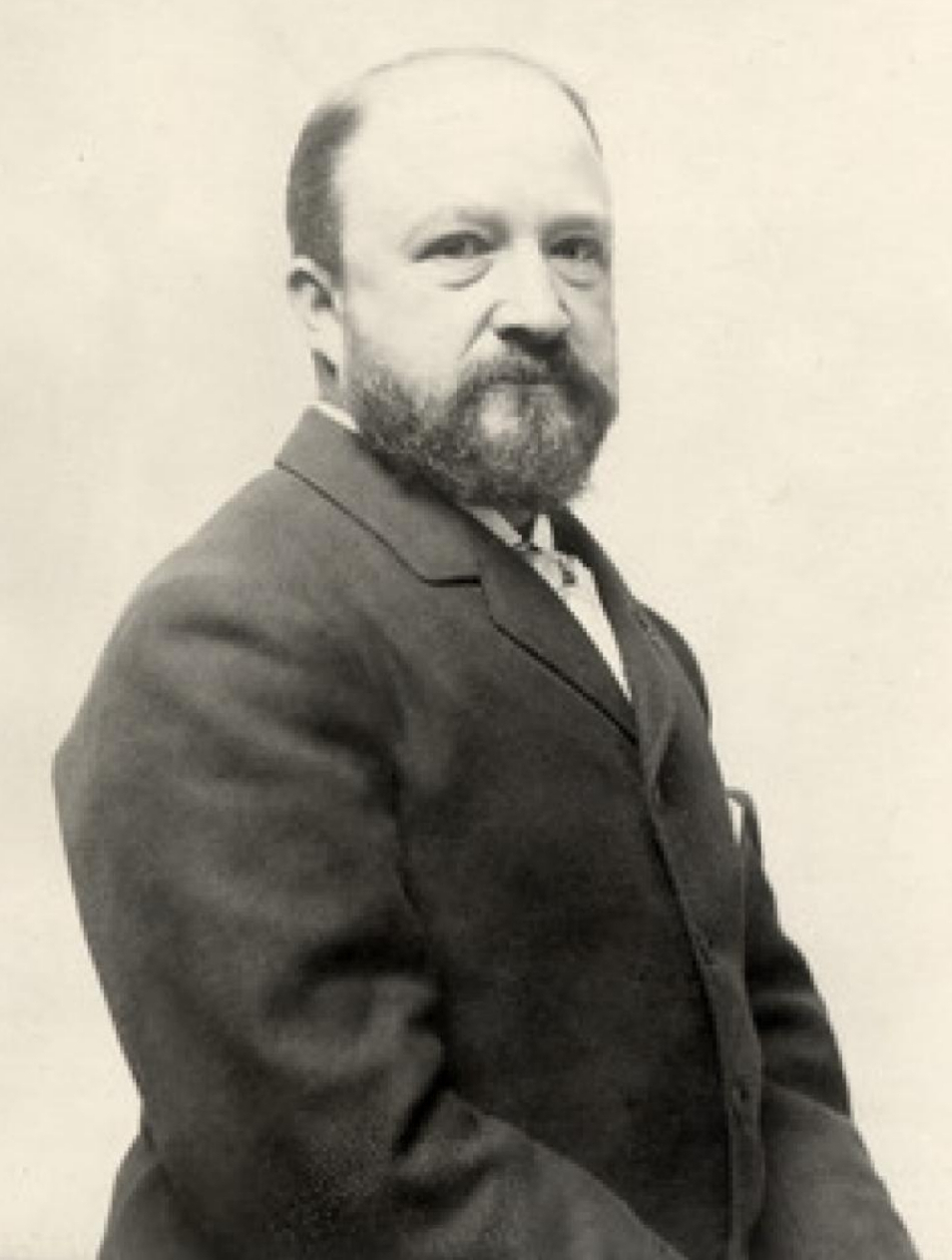
Portrait of Frans Van Leemputten, 1895

Frans Van Leemputten or Frans van Leemputten (29 December 1850 – 26 November 1914) was a Belgian Realist painter, watercolorist and art educator. He is known for his depictions of landscapes in the Campine and Brabantine regions in Belgium, genre scenes with villagers and animals.

== Life ==
Van Leemputten was born in Werchter as the son of Jan Frans Van Leemputten and Maria Catharina Van Cleynenbreugel. His father was originally a farmer but moved to Brussels in 1852 to become a painting restorer as he had an interest and some practice in art. Frans and his older brother Cornelius were encouraged by their father to practise art. In 1855 the family briefly moved to Antwerp where the young Frans attended classes at the Antwerp Academy of Fine Arts. In 1858 the family moved back to Brussels where Frans worked mainly in his father's restoration shop.

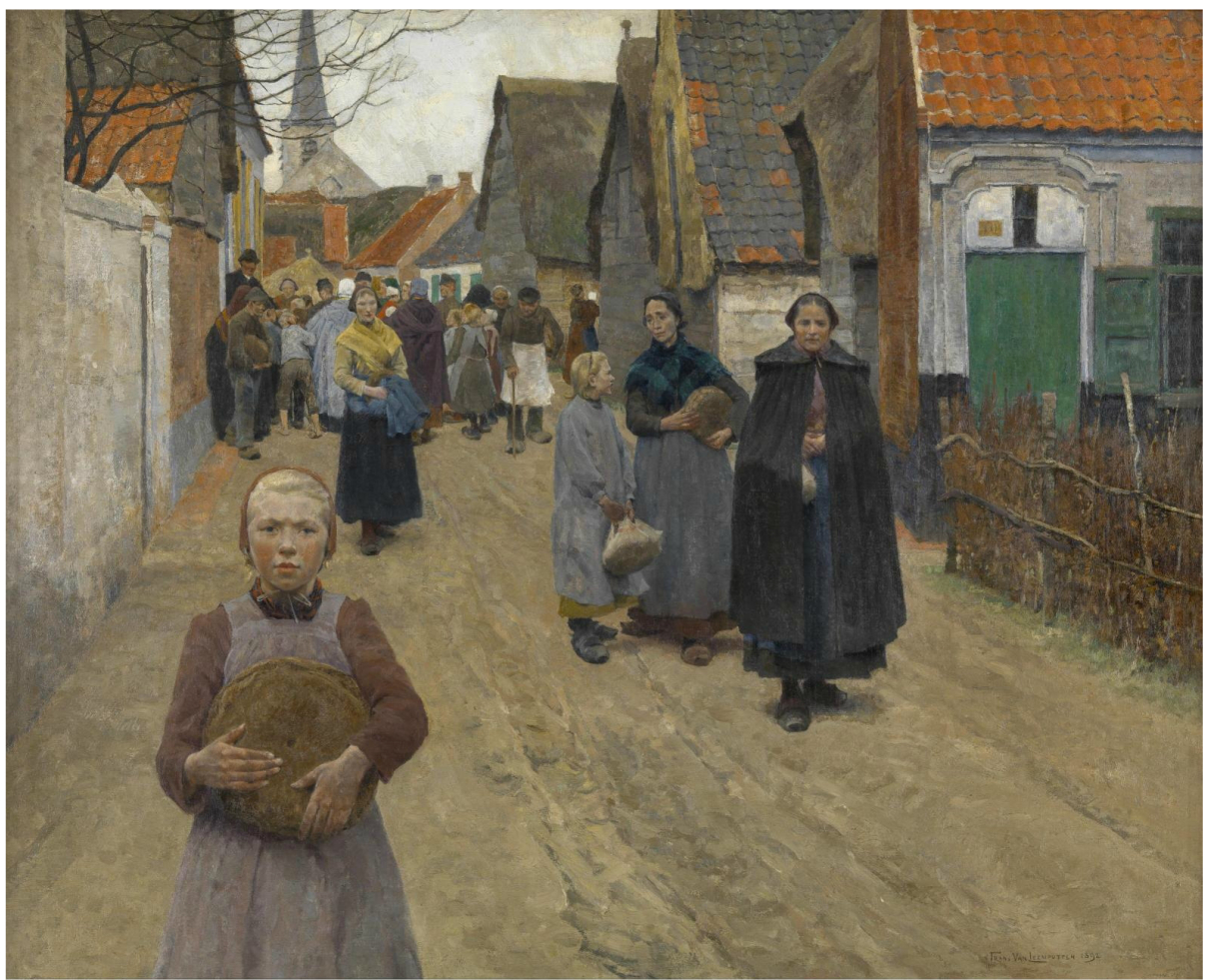
Distribution of bread in the village

Van Leemputten took evening classes at the Academy of Fine Arts of Brussels from 1865 to 1873. Here he was a student of Paul Lauters. He also attended the independent drawing club 'La Patte de Dindon' together with Franz Courtens and Constantin Meunier. Lauters encouraged Van Leemputten to paint from nature rather than to copy old compositions. Under the influence of Constantin Meunier and the Dutch landscape painter Paul Gabriël who was then living in Brussels and the reading of Hendrik Conscience's novels which extolled the virtues of the peasants of the Campine, Van Leemputten started to devote himself almost exclusively to the depiction of that region and its inhabitants.

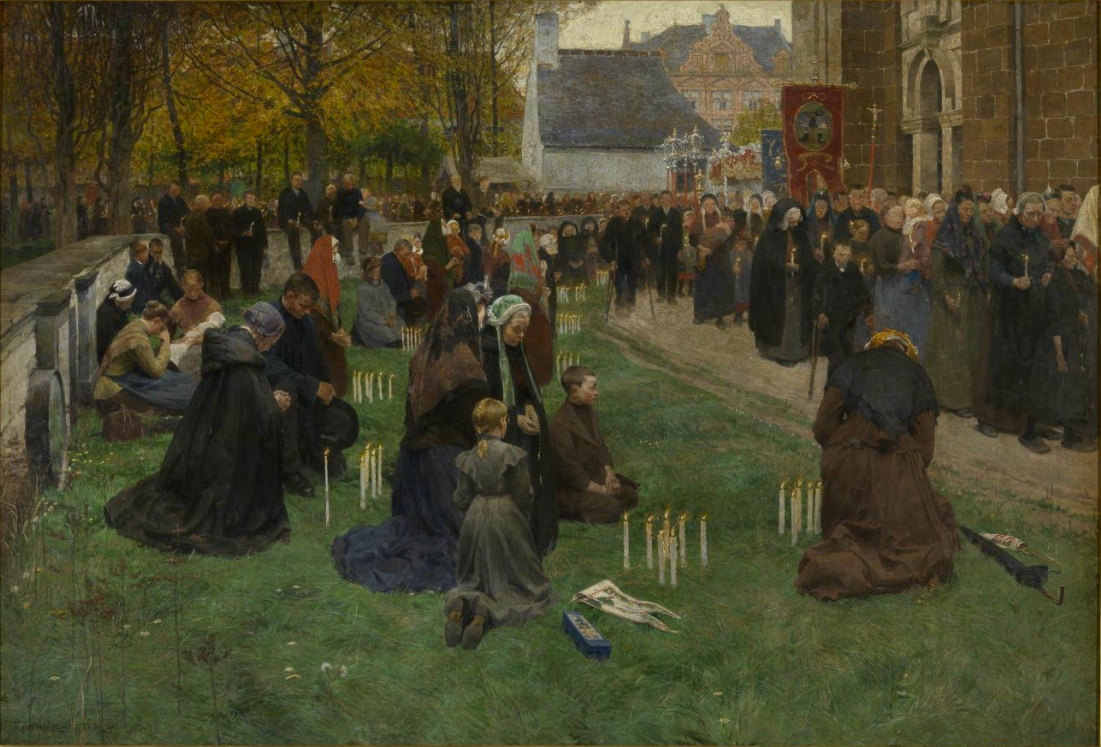
Candle procession in Scherpenheuvel

In 1872 Van Leemputten made his debut at the salon of La Chrysalide, the artist group to which also James Ensor, Louis Artan and Guillaume Vogels belonged. He also joined 'L'Essor', another artist group which mainly promoted realism in art and assisted its members financially and with the organization of exhibitions and the purchase of materials. Through his membership of these two groups Van Leemputten became closely linked to some of the most progressive Belgian artists of his day. From 1874 he submitted works to the Antwerp salon.

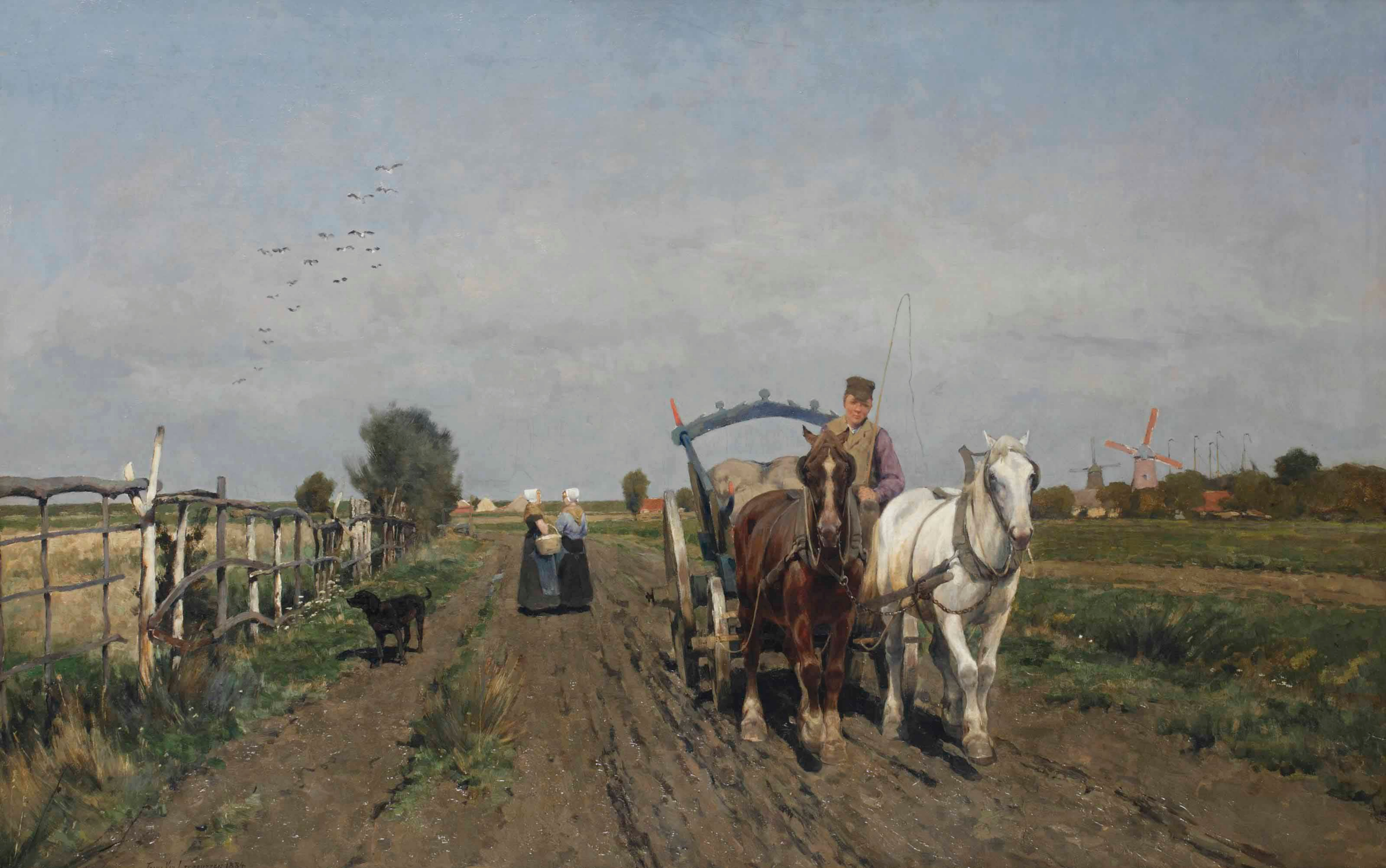
Horses on a path

Van Leemputten was in 1892 appointed professor of the painting of animals at the Higher Institute of Fine Arts of the Antwerp Academy. He replaced Charles Verlat in that position.

Van Leemputten's pupils included Frans Mortelmans, Frans Slager, Jan Van Puyenbroeck, Achille Van Sassenbrouck and Hendrik Jan Wolter.

Van Leemputten died in Antwerp on 26 November 1914.

== Work ==
Van Leemputten painted realist landscapes with figures, village scenes and animal scenes. He initially employed a dull palette but gradually started using brighter tones. Van Leemputten worked in oils as well as in watercolors. His work was influenced by the realism of Jean-François Millet.

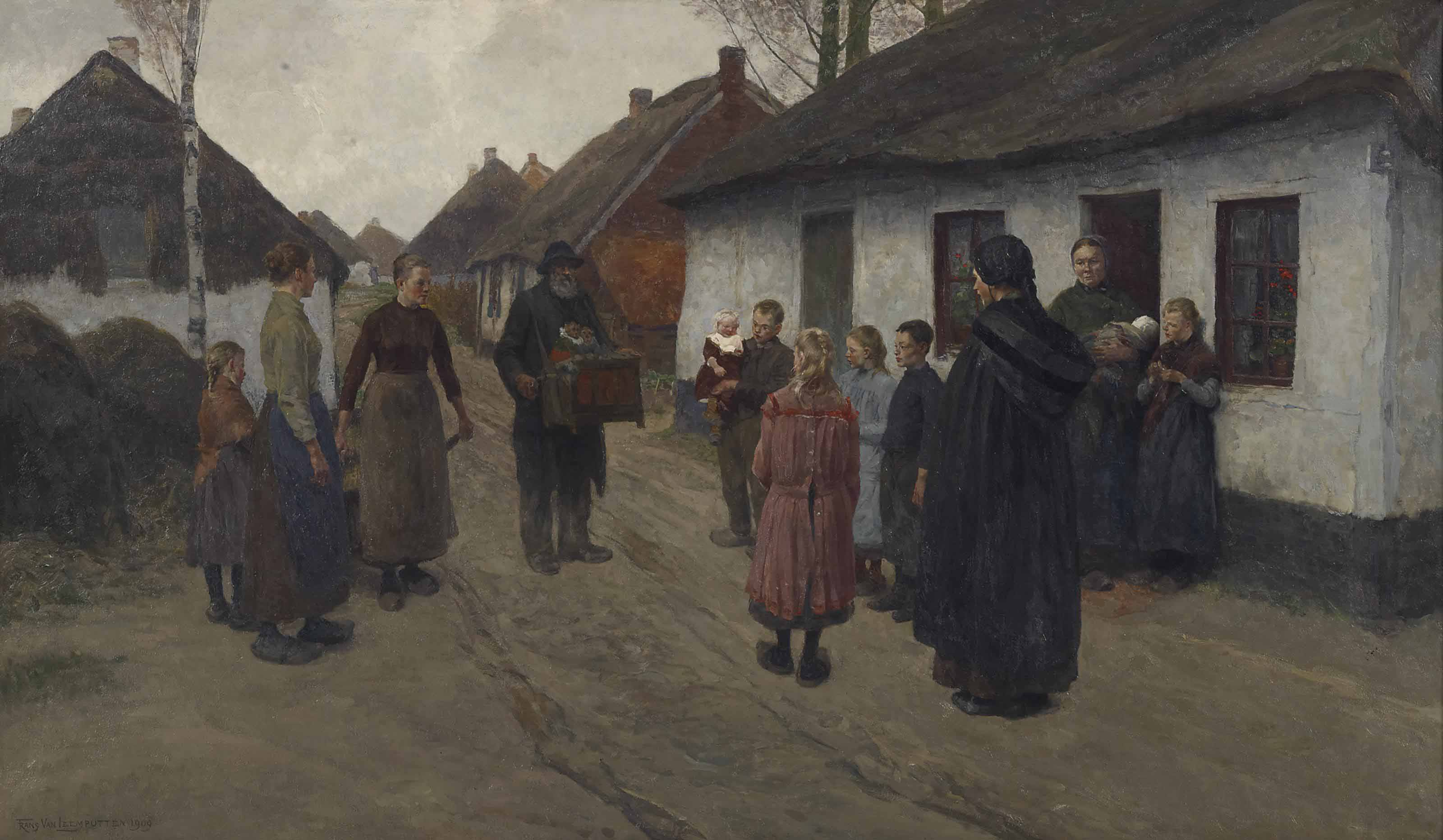
Music in the village

Van Leemputten was part of a group of Belgian painters who took refuge from the complexity of urban life to look for simplicity, purity and naturalness in the pre-industrial countryside. They saw the countryside as a serene world, which stood in sharp contrast to their familiar urban environment. In the countryside they searched for quiet and contemplation and identified themselves with the simple villagers. They had a particular fondness for the Campine region, which was relatively isolated and had been untouched by industrialization. Some of these artists, such as Theodoor Verstraete and Van Leemputten who both worked in the Campine, depicted the rural reality from their own urban background and viewpoint. Theodoor Verstraete was driven by his social consciousness and compassion with the villagers. Van Leemputten, on the other hand, concentrated on sharp observations of the daily life of the peasants, their customs and key life events. In his works he emphasized the dignity of the poor farmers, their mutual connectedness and profound devoutness. This is shown in works such as Distribution of bread in the village (1892, M - Museum Leuven).

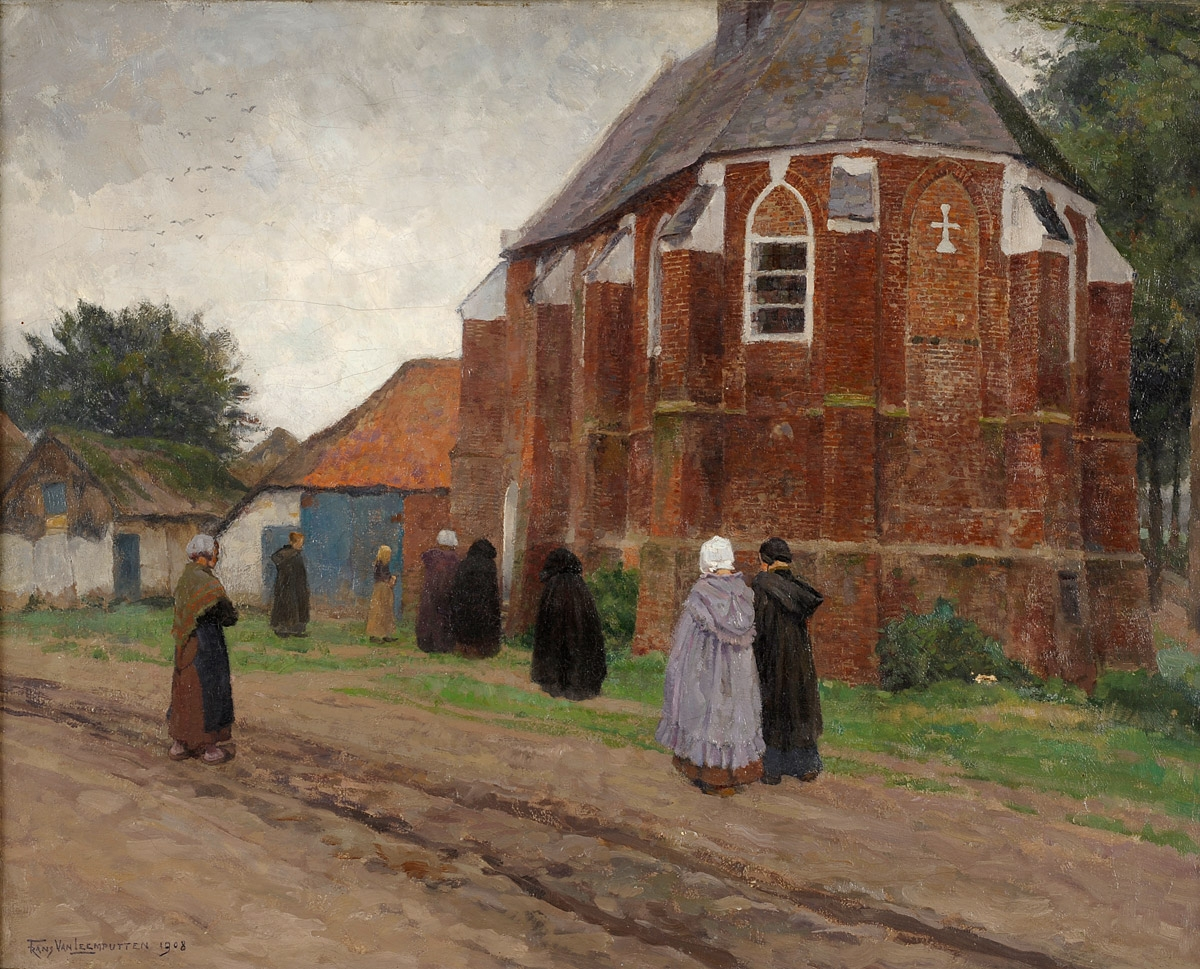
Going to church

His compositions are characterized by a clear palette and are executed with photographic precision. Van Leemputten often represented the Campine residents as monumental, immobile figures. Some of his works were thus transformed into still images of the serene country life. Thanks to their precise and objective observation, his works have documentary value.
