= Jan Michiel Ruyten =

Belgian Romantic painter, draughtsman and engraver

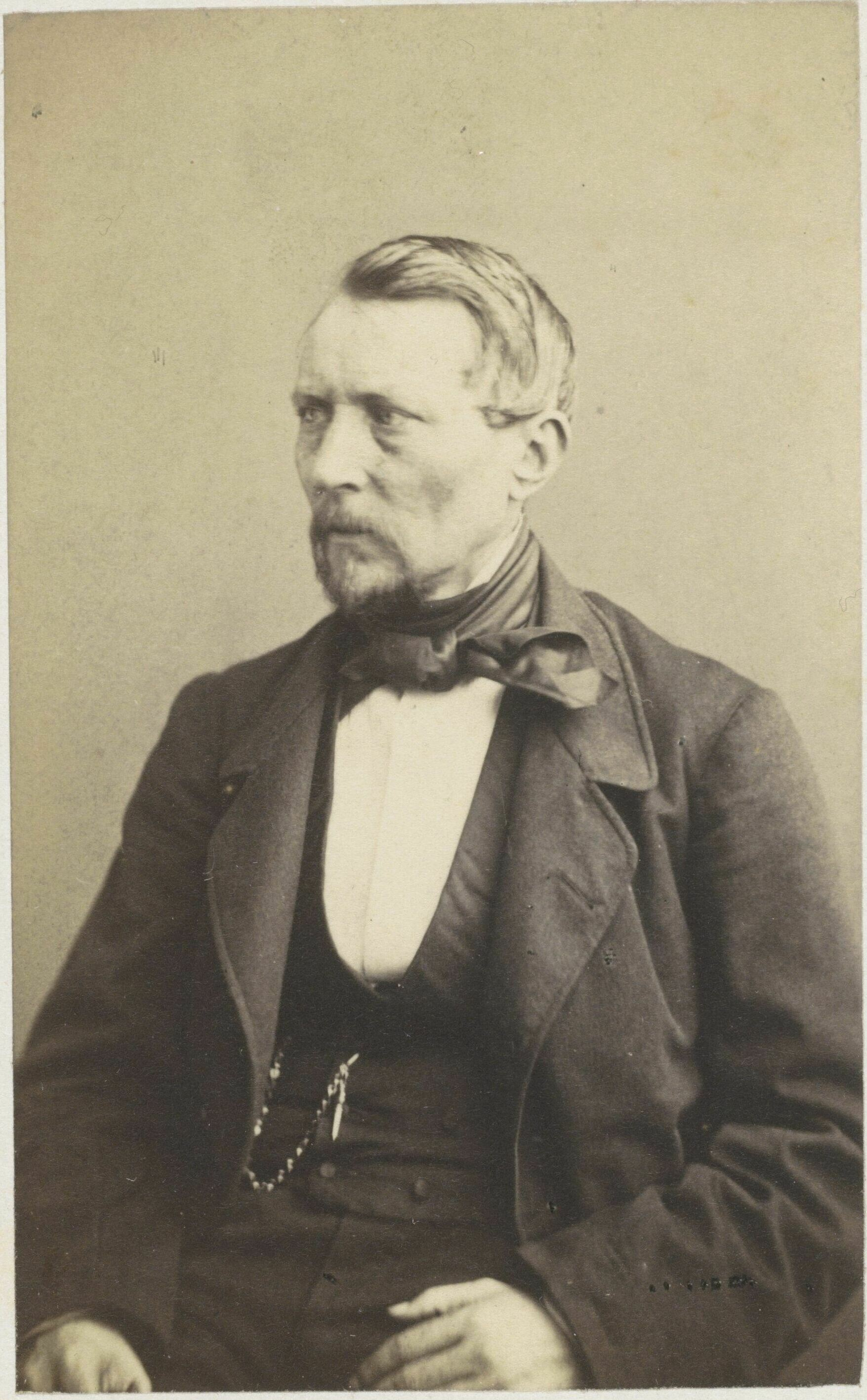
Jan Michiel Ruyten

Jan Michiel Ruyten or Jan Ruyten (9 April 1813, in Antwerp – 12 November 1881, in Antwerp) was a Belgian Romantic painter, draughts man and engraver known for his genre paintings, cityscapes, landscapes with figures and history paintings. He was influenced by Dutch Romantic painting.

== Life ==
Jan Michiel Ruyten was born in Antwerp where he received his first artistic training from Ignatius Josephus van Regemorter. Initially he painted landscapes and genre paintings and then developed towards city views. From a young age he started contributing his works to the salons in Ghent, Brussels and, Antwerp.

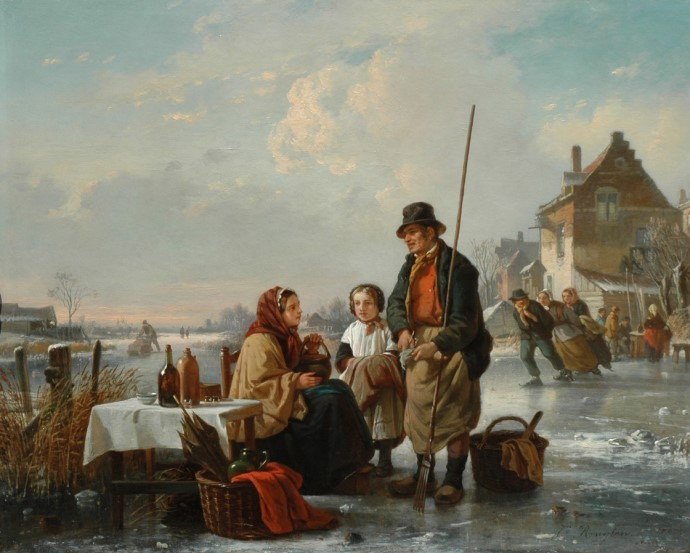
Koek-en-zopie vendor

Ruyten became in 1840 a member of the Antwerp Academy. The marine and city painter Hendrik Frans Schaefels worked as an assistant of Ruyten between 1842 and 1844.

Ruyten left Belgium for the Netherlands in the 1840s. It is known that he contributed a painting to the exhibition of The Hague in 1845. He is presumed to have lived and worked in The Hague until 1870. In the Netherlands he got to know the work of Andreas Schelfhout and this artist's pupil Wijnand Nuijen, which had a great influence on his choice of subjects. Schaefels exhibited in his native Belgium as well as in Vienna and London and was awarded numerous prizes.

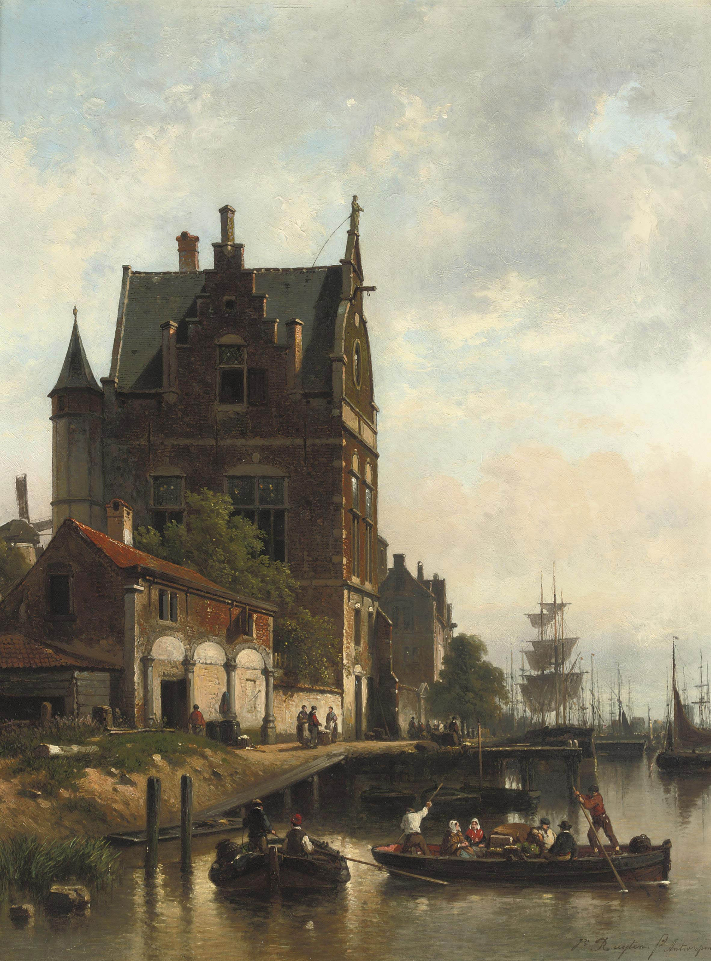
View on the quay of the Scheldt with the pilotage, Antwerp

Ruyten's pupils included Florent Crabeels, Alexander Josephus Thomas Wittevronghel (1824–1901), and Laurent Herman Redig (1822–1861).

== Work ==
Jan Michiel Ruyten painted genre scenes, landscapes with figures, winter landscapes, urban landscapes, waterscapes, seascapes, historical subjects, scenes with figures and architectural views. While initially he painted mainly cityscapes, during his residence in The Netherlands he was inspired by the work of Andreas Schelfhout and Wijnand Nuijen to start paintings river views, ports and ice scenes. Despite the Dutch influence on these works, he was able to maintain his originality. After 1870 he returned to painting city scenes and markets. Jan Michiel Ruyten was of the same generation as the prominent Belgian history painter Henri Leys and was to some extent influenced by that artist.

Ruyten worked in oils as well as in watercolors. Ruyten was one of the first artists to use the recently invented medium of the photograph for his cityscapes.
