= Frans Mortelmans =

Belgian painter

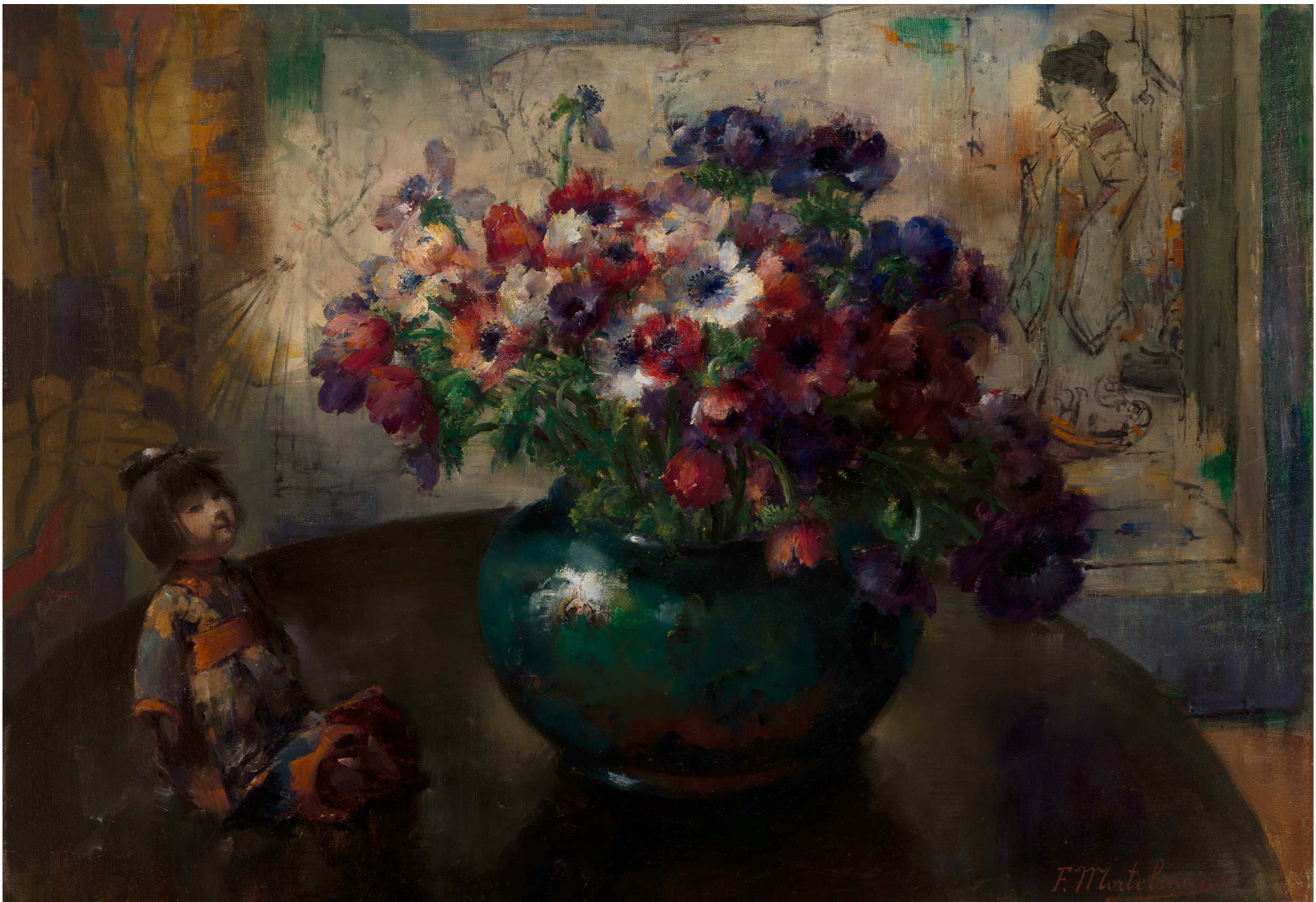
A souvenir of Japan

Frans Mortelmans (1 May 1865 in Antwerp – 11 April 1936 in Antwerp) was a Belgian painter, draughtsman and engraver. He initially produced portraits, history paintings, marines and genre scenes but later specialised in still lifes, and in particular flower pieces, with which he achieved considerable success.

== Life ==
Frans Mortelmans was born in Antwerp as the first son of Karel Mortelmans and Isabella Poinjaert. His father was a printer and his mother ran a stationery shop. Frans would have five siblings: two brothers and three sisters. His oldest brother Lodewijk became a renowned composer. All the Mortelmans children attended the local music school and the Antwerp Academy of Fine Arts.

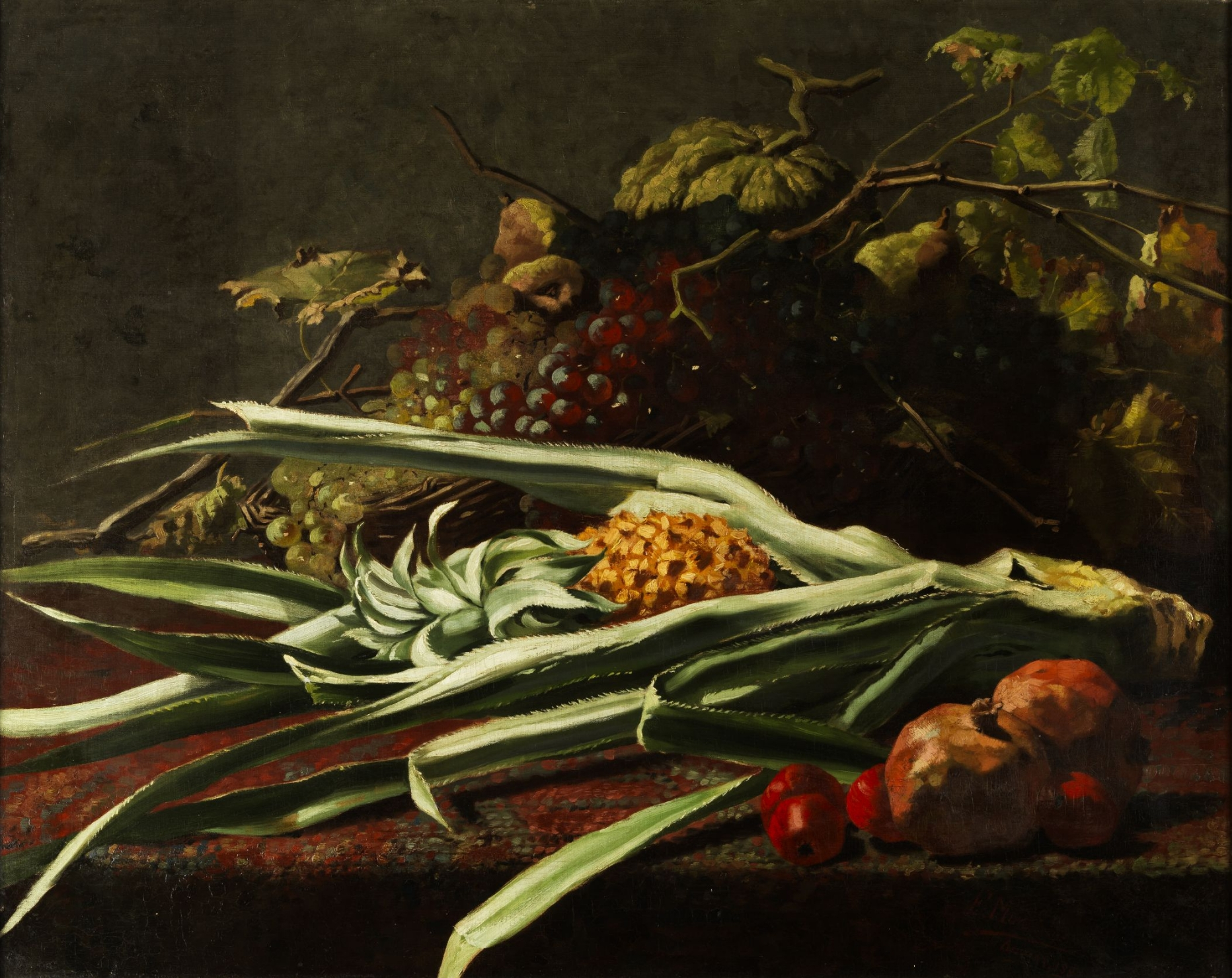
Still life with pineapple, grapes, apples and pomegranates

Frans Mortelmans studied at the Antwerp Academy of Fine Arts under the direction of Lucas Victor Schaefels and Charles Verlat from 1876 to 1886. He then continued his studies at the Higher Institute of Fine Arts of Antwerp, the recently established institute for post-graduate studies of the academy. Here he studied under Albrecht De Vriendt as well as Frans Van Leemputten.

Frans Mortelmans led a very bourgeois existence. In 1897 he married Marie Fontain. The couple remained childless. His principal income was derived from his job as a teacher at the Municipal Academy of Berchem. In the final years of his career until his retirement in 1835 he was the caretaking director of that Academy as a replacement of the director in office who had suffered a stroke. Two of his most famous students at the academy were Joris Minne and Antoon Mastboom. Mortelmans also gave private lessons to Countess Romania du Bois d'Aische, the sister-in-law of Fritz Mayer van den Bergh, whose art collection was the basis of the collection of the Museum Mayer van den Bergh. Mortelmans also taught his nephew Franck Mortelmans (1898–1986) who became a marine artist.

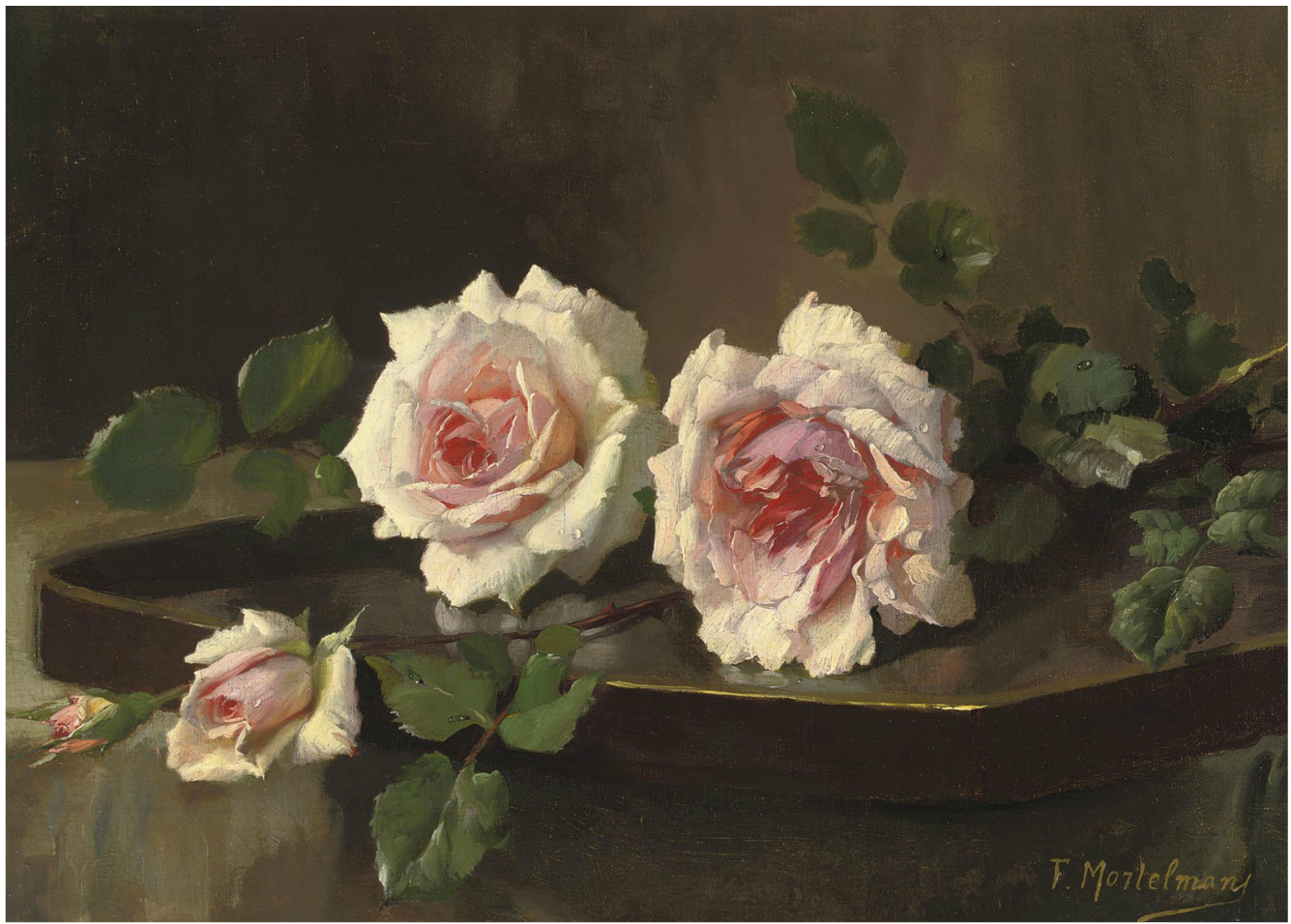
Two pink Prince-de-Bulgarie roses

Frans Mortelmans participated actively in the art societies that flourished in Flanders around the turn of the 20th century. Like his brother Lodewijk, he was a member of the Antwerp artistic society 'De Scalden'. The society initially had two objectives: the organisation of exhibitions of 'ornamental art' and the artistic design of official parades and carnival parades. Mortelmans exhibited his works at the various events organised by 'De Scalden' as well as those held by the local art societies 'Arte Et Labore' and "De Distel'. He further participated in the official salons and various exhibitions in Antwerp, Mechelen, Ghent and Liège.

He achieved success during his lifetime and found patrons at home and abroad. In 1903 his work received official recognition in Belgium when one of his watercolors was acquired by the Royal Museum of Fine Arts Antwerp. In 1932 he was made Commander in the Order of Leopold.

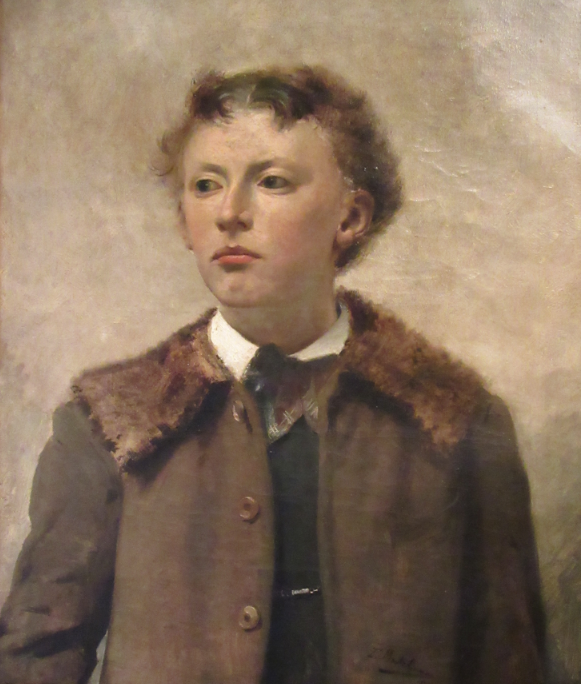
Portrait of young boy

== Work ==
Frans Mortelmans was a very prolific painter. To date, more than 850 of his works have been inventoried. His most productive period is situated around 1900. Frans Mortelmans commenced his career as a painter of portraits and figures, including genre scenes. From 1892 onwards, he almost exclusively painted very decorative and harmoniously composed still lifes and flower pieces. It is through these works that he established his reputation. His compositions with pink roses are in particular highly valued.

His work situates itself between impressionism and realism with some luminist touches. He produced many pastel works.
