= Joris Minne =

Belgian artist (1897–1988)

Joris Minne (Ostend, 1897 – Antwerp, 1988) was a Belgian sculptor, graphic artist, illustrator and painter who helped revive the art of engraving in Belgium.

== Life and work ==
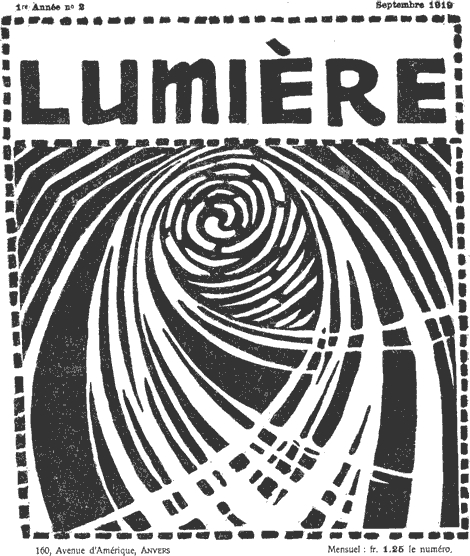
Cover of Lumière, September 1919

Joris Minne was born in Ostend. His parents moved to Antwerp soon after he was born. In Antwerp, he completed middle school and then went to the higher school (ateneum) where one of his teachers was August Borms. During the weekend, he attended art classes at the Berchem Academy of Fine Arts. Here, one of his teachers was Frans Mortelmans.

During World War I Minne took a job at the Antwerp city Welfare Department. Here he came into contact with Roger Avermaete who was departmental head. Roger Avermaete had a circle of artistic friends who decided to found a magazine. The magazine Lumière was first published in Antwerp in August 1919. The magazine was an artistic and literary journal published in French. Lumière's title was a reference to the magazine Clarté, that was published in Paris by Henri Barbusse. The principal five artists who illustrated the text and the column headings were Frans Masereel, Jan Frans Cantré, Jozef Cantré, Henri van Straten and Joris Minne. They became known as 'De Vijf' or 'Les Cinq' ('The Five'). The magazine Lumière was a key force in generating renewed interest in wood engraving in Belgium. The five artists in 'De Vijf' group were instrumental in popularizing the art of wood, copper and linoleum engraving and introducing Expressionism in early 20th-century Belgium.

In 1939 Minne started sculpting and won widespread recognition for his sculptures in 1950 with an exhibition in Antwerp's Middelheimpark. He mainly sculpted wood.

Minne's pupils include Chantal De Hemptinne, Claire Pâques, Giele Roelofs and Niel Steenbergen.

== Honours ==
- 1919 : Commander of the Order of Leopold.
