= Bladel =

- Municipality and town
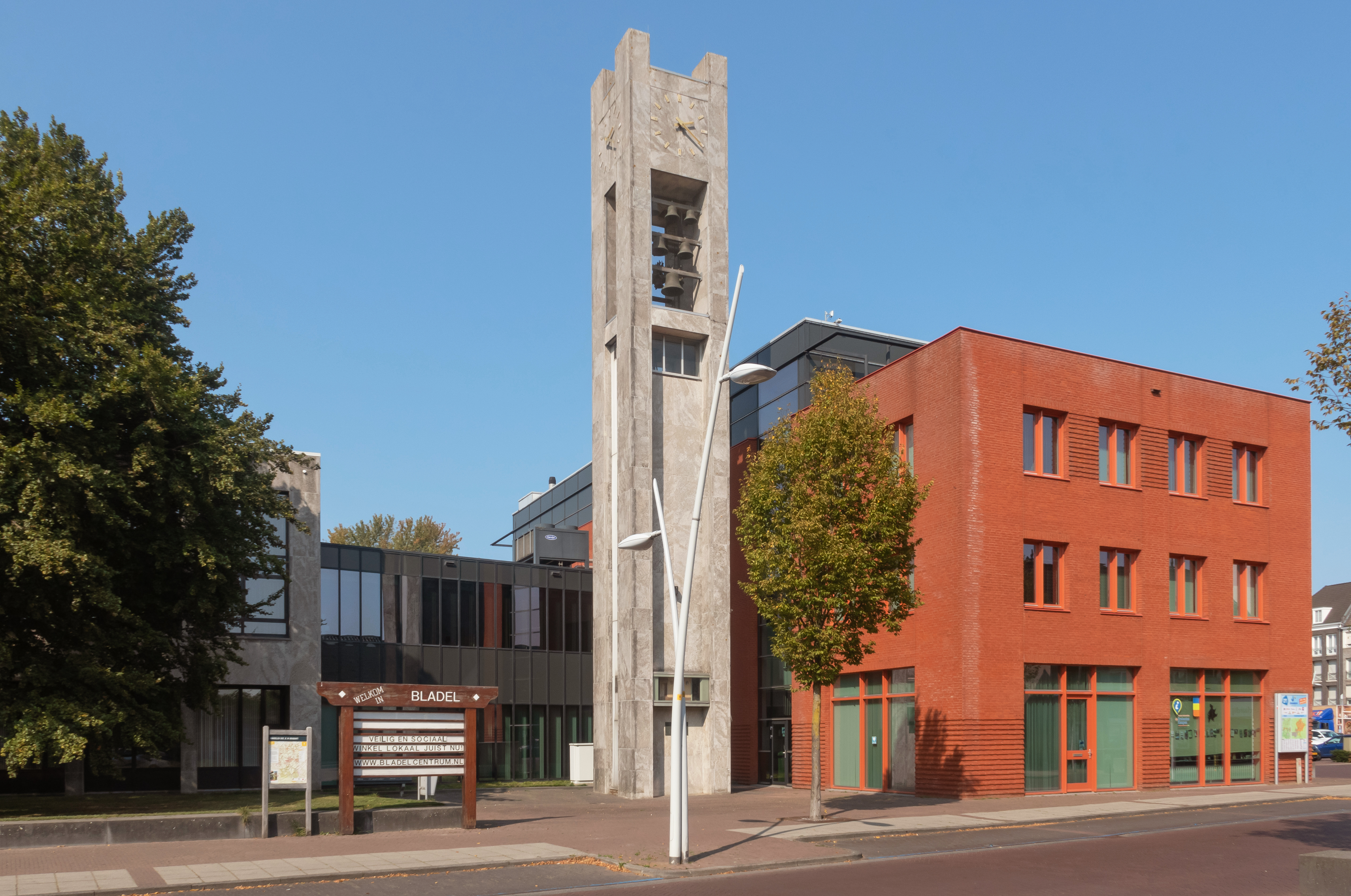
- Town hall in Bladel

- Flag Coat of arms

- Location in North Brabant
- Coordinates: 51°22′N 5°13′E
- Country: Netherlands
- Province: North Brabant
- Established: 1 January 1997

Government
  - Body: Municipal council
  - Mayor: Maurits van den Bosch (VVD)

Area
  - Total: 75.62 km^{2} (29.20 sq mi)
  - Land: 75.33 km^{2} (29.09 sq mi)
  - Water: 0.29 km^{2} (0.11 sq mi)
- Elevation: 32 m (105 ft)

Population (January 2021)
  - Total: 20,529
  - Density: 273/km^{2} (710/sq mi)
- Time zone: UTC+1 (CET)
  - Summer (DST): UTC+2 (CEST)
- Postcode: 5527–5534
- Area code: 0497
- Website: www.bladel.nl

Bladel (Dutch pronunciation: [ˈblaːdəl]) is a municipality and town in the province of North Brabant, Southern Netherlands. In 2019, it had a population of 20,175.

== Population centres ==
- Bladel
- Casteren
- Hapert
- Hoogeloon
- Netersel

=== Topography ===
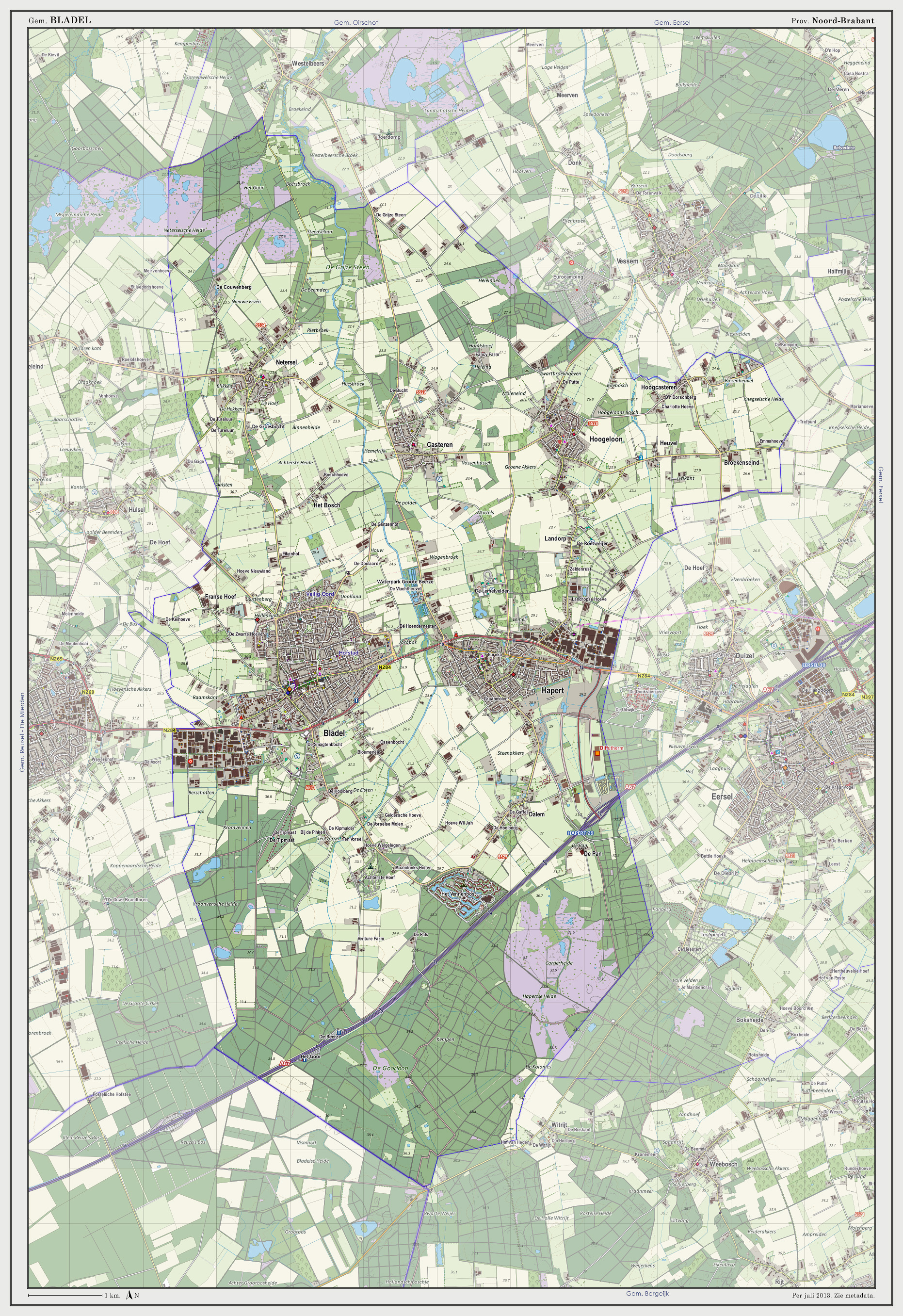

Dutch Topographic map of the municipality of Bladel, 2013.

== Notable residents ==
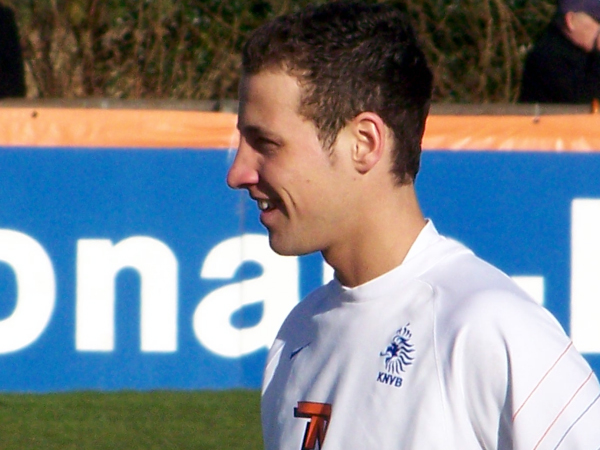
Roy Beerens, 2008

- Jan Renier Snieders (1812 in Bladel – 1888) a Flemish writer
- August Snieders (1825 in Bladel – 1904) a Flemish journalist and writer
- Corky de Graauw (born 1951 in Bladel) a former Dutch ice hockey player, competed at the 1980 Winter Olympics
- Alain van Katwijk (born 1979 in Bladel) a former Dutch cyclist
- Roy Beerens (born 1987 in Bladel) a Dutch professional footballer with 320 club caps

== Gallery ==
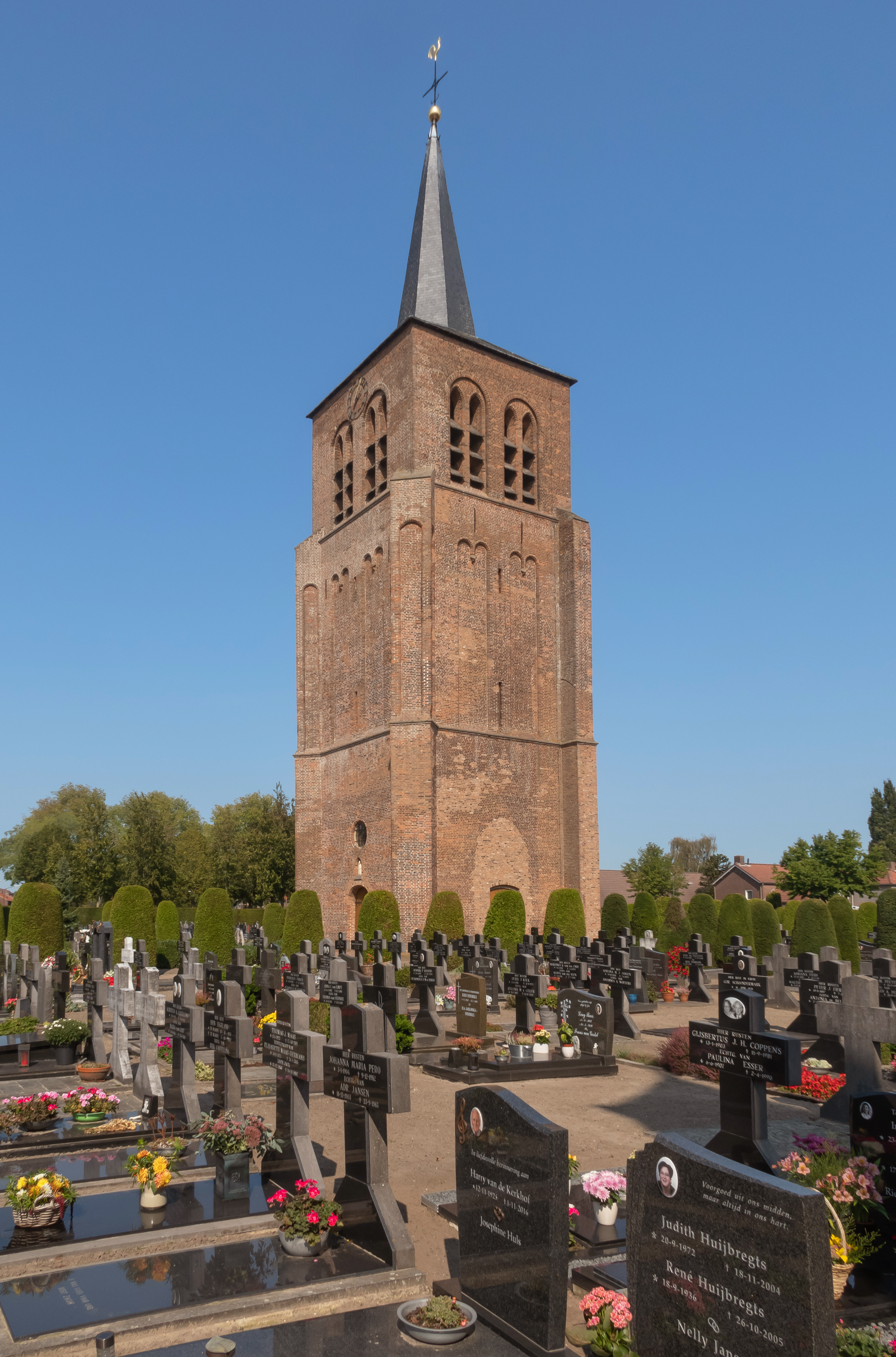
Tower former church

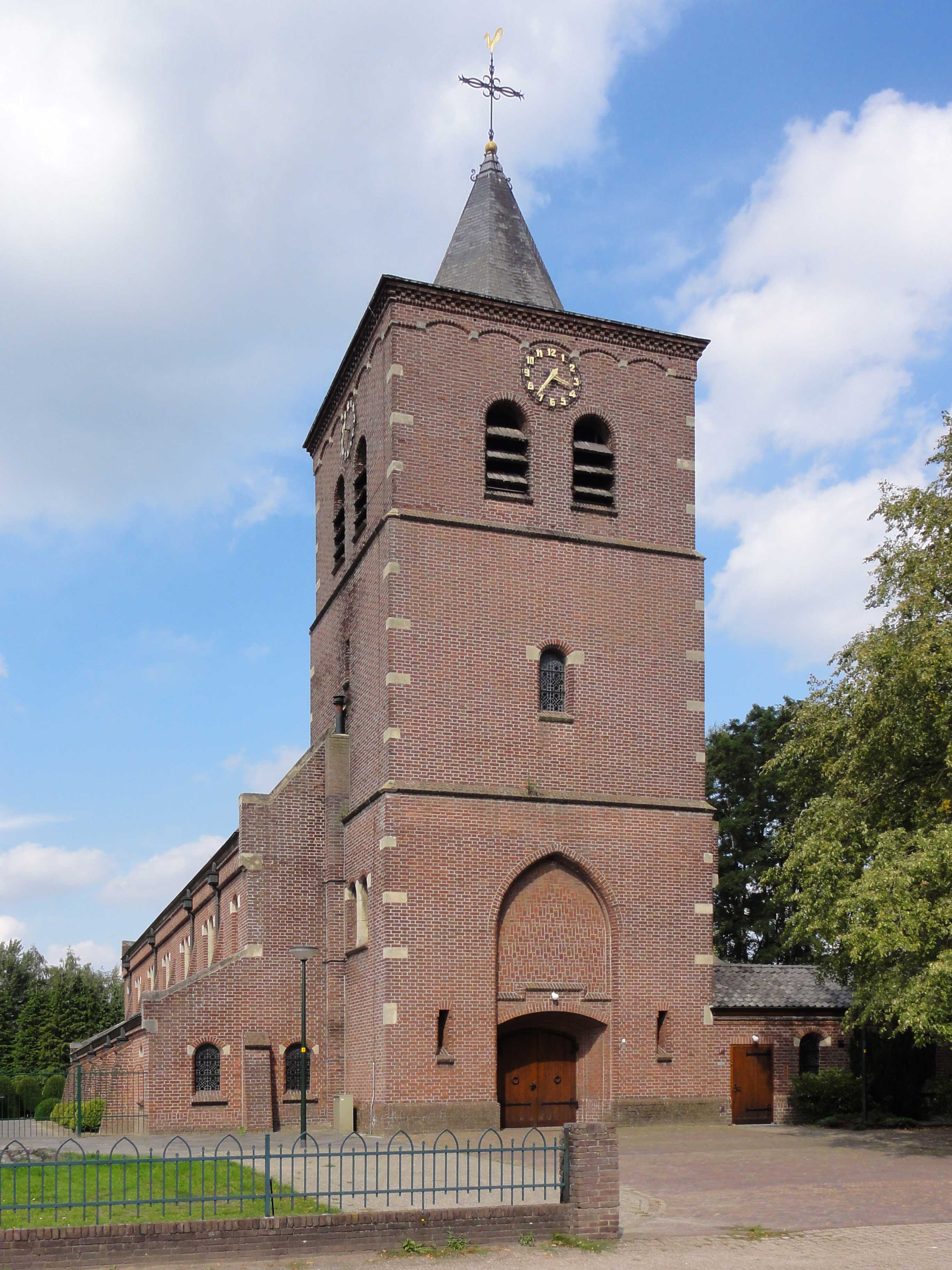
Antonius van Padua en Brigidakerk Netersel

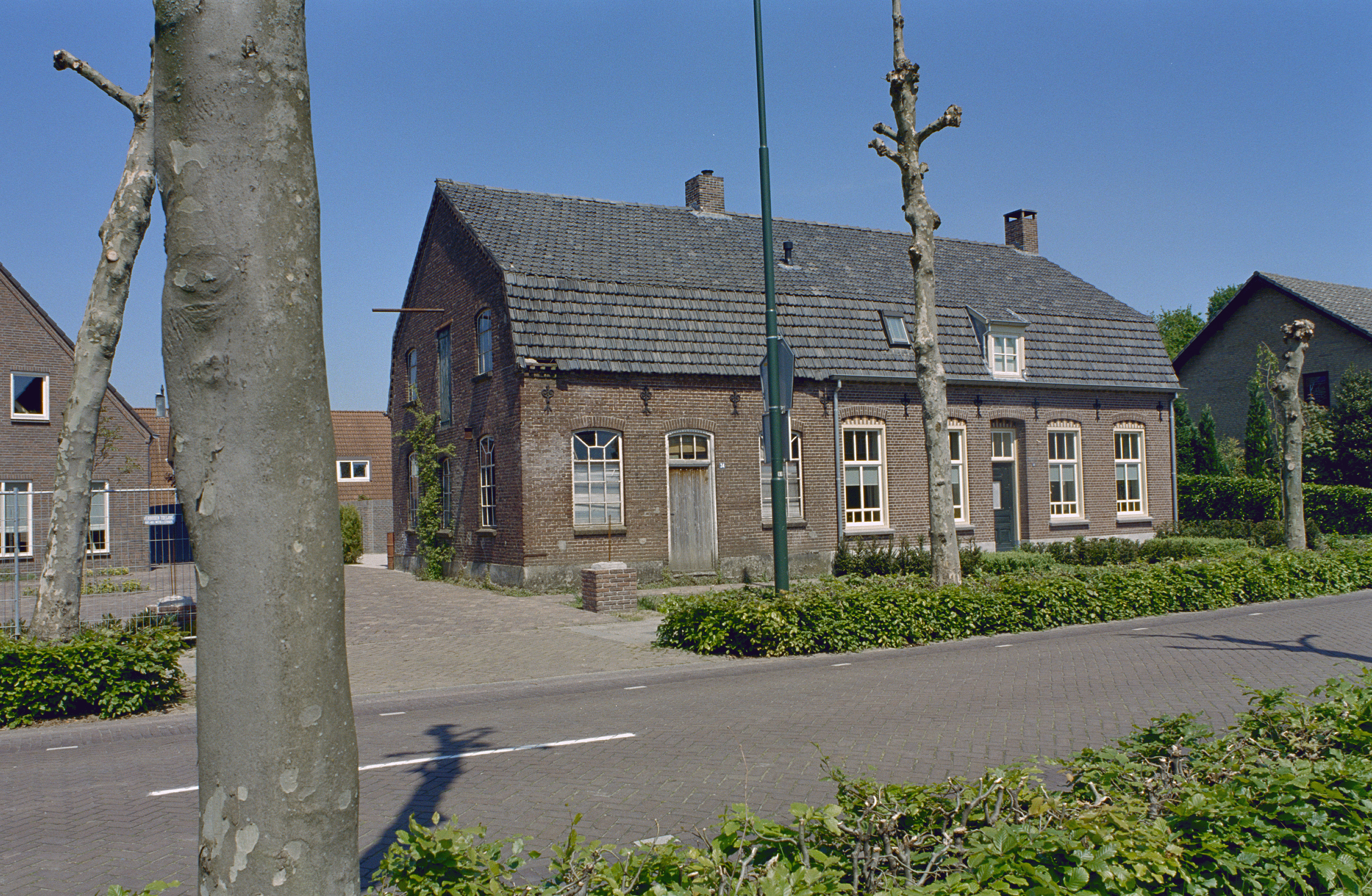
Overzicht - Hapert

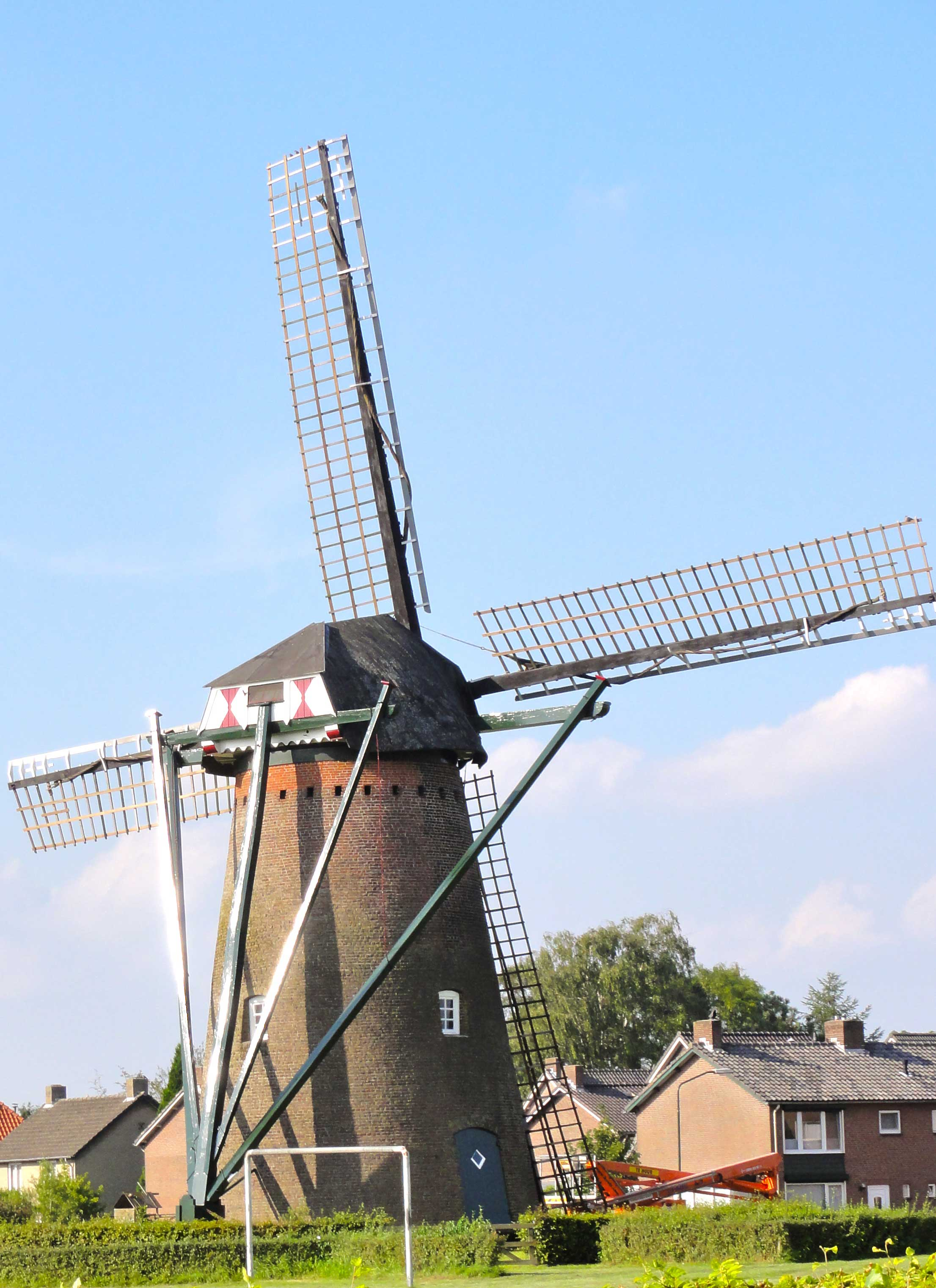
Hapertse molen

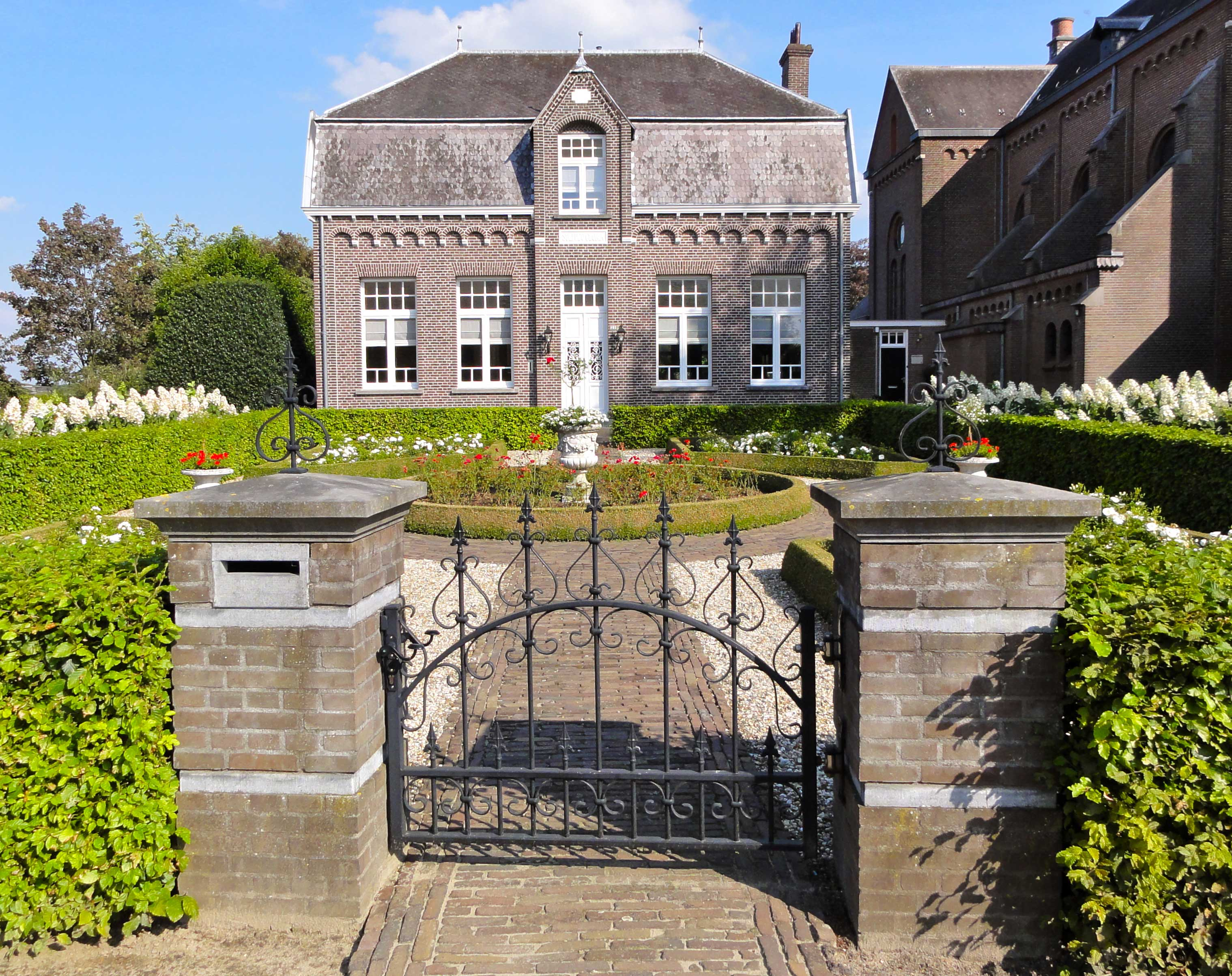
Pastorie bij de Sint-Willibrordkerk in Casteren

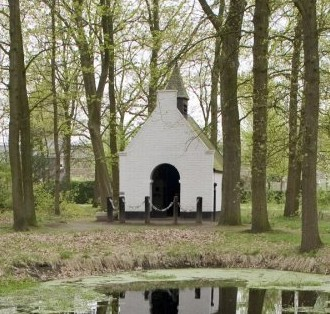
Overzicht kapel gezien vanaf de andere kant van het water - Hoogeloon
