= Lucas Victor Schaefels =

Belgian painter and engraver

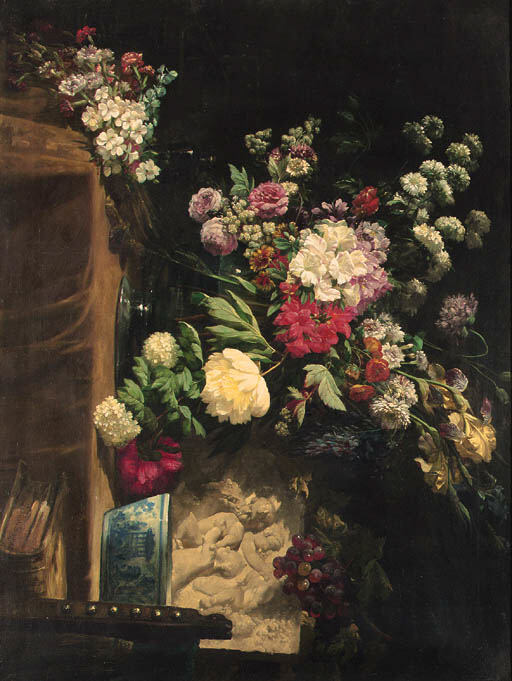
Azaleas, peonies, lilac, iris, blossom and other flowers in a vase

Lucas Victor Schaefels or Lucas Schaefels, baptismal name Lucianus Victor Schaefels (Antwerp, 6 April 1824 – Antwerp, 17 September 1885) was a Belgian painter, draughtsman and engraver known for his still lifes, which for the most part were flower and hunting pieces. He worked in a meticulous style reminiscent of the 17th century Flemish Baroque.

== Life ==
Lucas Victor Schaefels trained with his father Hendrik Raphael Schaefels, a decorative painter working in a Neo-Classical style and a teacher of decorative design at the Antwerp Academy. His younger brother Hendrik Frans “Rik” Schaefels (1827–1904) became a successful painter and draughtsman who specialized in naval battles, seascapes and Antwerp genre scenes.

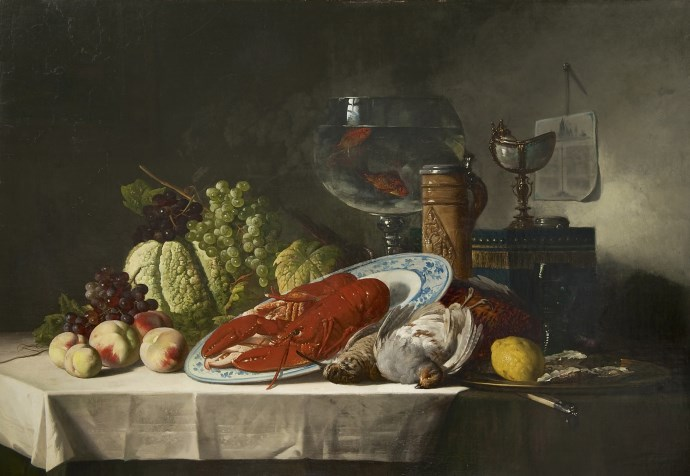
Still life with a lobster

Lucas Victor Schaefels began as a student of the Antwerp Academy and later became himself a professor of ornamental design at the academy, replacing his father in that position.

Schaefels' decorative style and strong sense of design earned him a commission to paint the chapels in a few churches in Antwerp. Antwerp was at the time a center of flower growing, flower competitions and flower shows, as well as of art competitions and exhibitions. Schaefels acted as the unofficial city festival designer as he designed and organised public decorations for various of these events in Antwerp.

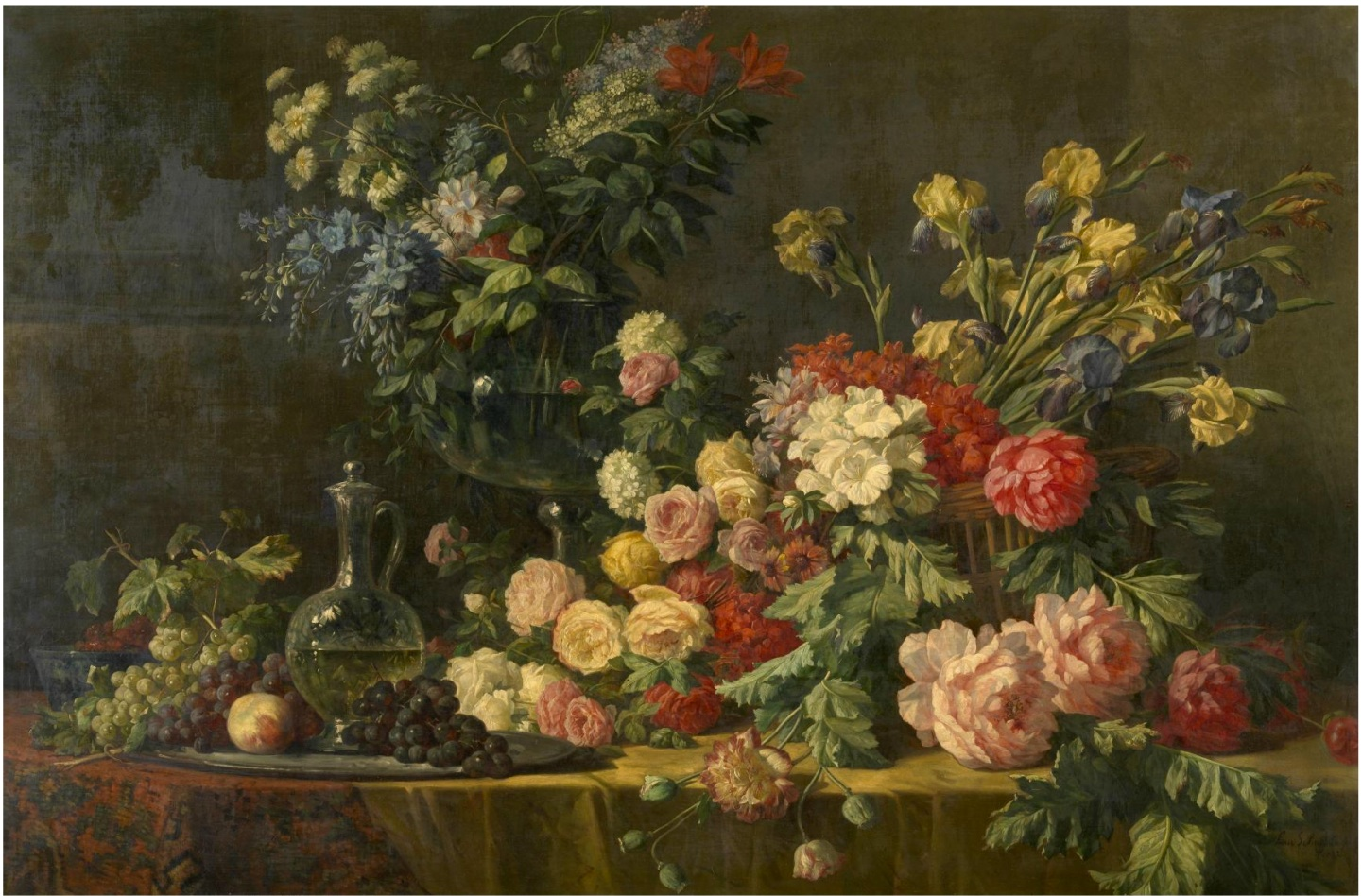
Flowers and fruit

Lucas Victor Schaefels taught many of the next generation of still life painters in Antwerp, including Emile Mahieu (1861–1955), Frans Mortelmans (1865–1936), Joseph Van de Roye (1861–1941), Alphonse Van Beurden (1854–1938), Piet Van Engelen (1863-1924), Frans Joris (1851-1914) and Jules Schaumburg.

== Work ==
Lucas Victor Schaefels was the foremost floral and still life painter of his generation in Antwerp. His style goes back to the Flemish Baroque still life paintings of the 17th century and appears not to have been influenced by contemporary art movements. His works feature elaborate and opulent interiors with a wealth of game, produce and flowers arranged in a traditional pyramid-shaped composition.

He also produced engravings for frontispieces.
