= Lodewijk Mortelmans =

Belgian composer and conductor

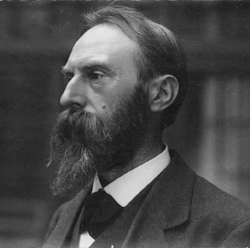
- Born: 5 February 1868; Antwerp, Belgium
- Died: 24 June 1952 (aged 84); Antwerp, Belgium
- Relatives: Frans Mortelmans

miniatuur Lodewijk Mortelmans (5 February 1868, Antwerp – 24 June 1952, Antwerp) was a Belgian composer and conductor of Flemish ancestry. Sometimes called de Vlaamse Brahms ("the Flemish Brahms"), Mortelmans composed in a number of forms, including piano music and orchestral works, but he was most celebrated in his day for his art songs. Beginning in 1899, he often set the poetry of the priest Guido Gezelle. His opera De Kinderen der Zee (The Children of the Sea) was first produced in 1920 at the Vlaamse Opera.

== Biography ==
=== Family ===
Mortelmans was from a family of six surviving children born to Isabella and Karel Mortelmans. His father was a printer, and his elder brother Frans a painter. He was married twice. With Gabriella Mortelmans (d. 3 May 1917) he had seven children, two of which (Frits, d. 22 July 1917 and Guido, d. 10 January 1917) died with her in 1917. Mortelmans composed In Memoriam in her honour. His second wife was the pianist and teacher Gabrielle Radoux.

=== Career ===
Mortelmans studied music at the Royal Flemish Conservatory in Antwerp, where his teachers included Peter Benoit, Joseph Tilborghs, and Jan Blockx, as well as Arthur De Greef (piano) and Hubert Ferdinand Kufferath (counterpoint). In 1893, he was a winner of the Belgian Prix de Rome with his cantata Lady Macbeth. Both Mortelmans and his brother were members of the arts group De Scalden. Mortelmans was also affiliated with the arts groups Studie and De Kapel, and the arts journal Van Nu en Straks.

From 1901, Mortelmans taught counterpoint and fugue at the Royal Flemish Conservatory, and became its director on 6 September 1924. He retired from the post in 1933. His students included Lodewijk De Vocht, Marinus De Jong and Flor Peeters.

In 1903, with financial support from the patron François Franck, Mortelmans founded the Maatschappij der Nieuwe Concerten ("Society of New Concerts") in Antwerp, which attracted notable guest conductors and artists such as Gustav Mahler, Siegfried Wagner, Hans Richter, Richard Strauss, Sergei Rachmaninoff, Pablo de Sarasate, Jacques Thibaud, Pablo Casals, and Fritz Kreisler. Mortelmans was also a founder of the organisation NAVEA, which is now SABAM (Société d'Auteurs Belge - Belgische Auteurs Maatschappij). He also helped to found the Eugène Ysaÿe Violin Competition, which later became the Queen Elisabeth Music Competition.

== Selected compositions ==
Opera

- De Kinderen der Zee (The Children of the Sea); libretto by Raphaël Verhulst

Orchestra

- Boertige optocht (1889)
- Lyrisch Gedicht, Symphonic Poem for chamber orchestra or string orchestra with harp (1893)
- Helios, Symphonic Poem (1894)
- Lente-Idylle (Spring Idyll), Symphonic Poem (1894)
- Mythe der Lente (Myth of Spring), Symphonic Poem (1895)
- Homerische Symphonie (Homeric Symphony) (1896)
- Hulde aan Peter Benoit (1897)
- De kinderen der zee (1901)
- Twee Landelijke Stukjes (1912)
- Bruiloftsmarsch (1917)
- Herdenking (In memoriam)
- Idyllische Naklank (Idyllic Reminiscence) for chamber orchestra (1919)
- Morgenstemming (Morning Mood), Symphonic Poem (1922)
- Treurdicht (1925)
- Avondlied for chamber orchestra (1928); also for piano
- Kindersuite (1928)
- Jubelmarsch (1930); also for band
- Evangelisch diptiek (1933)
- Mei (May), Symphonic Poem

Band

- Jubelmarsch (1930); also for orchestra

Concertante

- Lyrische Pastorale for horn and chamber orchestra (1910)
- Romanza for violin and orchestra (1935); original for violin and piano
- Gewijde Zang for violin and string orchestra (1943); also for violin and piano or organ

Chamber music

- Eenzame Herder (Berger solitaire) for woodwind quintet or septet (1920); also for piano
- Romanza for violin (or viola) and piano (1935); also for violin and orchestra
- Gewijde Zang for violin and piano or organ (1943); also for violin and string orchestra

Piano

- Primula veris (1891)
- Minuet varié (1916)
- 3 Elegies

1. In memoriam (1917)
2. Exultation (1917)
3. Solitude (1919)

- Marche Nuptiale (1917)
- Lyrical Pieces

1. Idyllic Echoes (1919)
2. Two Little Pastorals (1912)

- Impromptu (1918)
- Melancholia (1919)
- Memories (1919)
- Opwelling (Élan) (1919)
- Pastorale in D major (1919)
- Wals (Valse; Waltz) (1919)
- Eenzame Herder (Berger solitaire) (1920); also for woodwind quintet
- Stemmingsbeeld (Mood Picture) (1920)
- Het wielewaalt en leeuwerkt (1921)
- Drie kleine elegiën (Trois petites élégies) (1923)
- Gemoedelijkheid (Pensée intime) (1923)
- Avondlied (Chant du soir) (1928); also for chamber orchestra
- Humoresk (Humoresque) (1928)
- Kindersuite (Suite enfantine) (1928)
- Impromptu (1929)
- Stemmingsstukje (Intermezzo) (1929)
- Mazurka (1929)
- Saïdjah's Lied (1929)
- Miniaturen voor Klavier – deel I (1929)
- Kinderwalsje (Valse enfantine) (1939)
- Miniaturen voor Klavier – deel II (1942)
- Miniaturen voor Klavier – deel III (1944)
- Zevenentwintig oud-vlaamsche Volksliederen (27 Old Flemish Folk Songs)

Choral

- Ave Verum for mixed chorus a cappella (1901)
- Blijdschap (Joie) for female chorus and piano or orchestra (1926)
- Caecilia for mixed chorus a cappella (1921)
- De bloemen en de sterren for girls' chorus and orchestra (1887)
- De Merode cantate for mixed chorus, children's chorus and orchestra (1905)
- De Vlaamsche tale for chorus and orchestra (1900)
- Geeft mij eens dien dag for mixed chorus a cappella (1938)
- Gekwetst ben ik van binnen for male chorus a cappella (1921)
- Heer, mijn hert is boos en schuldig for mixed chorus a cappella (1938)
- Hendrik Conscience herdacht for mixed chorus and orchestra
- Het was een Maghet for mixed chorus a cappella
- Hoger als mijn oogen dragen for mixed chorus a cappella (1938)
- Houdt U fier for unison chorus and orchestra (or brass and percussion, or string orchestra with piano) (1889); also for voice and piano
- In Jesus' Name for mixed chorus a cappella
- Jagerskoor for male voices
- Jesu, wijs en wondermachtig for mixed chorus a cappella (1938)
- Jong Vlaanderen for children's chorus and orchestra (1907)
- Kindje, wat ben je toch zacht for girls' chorus and orchestra (1910)
- Klaar bloed en louter wonden for mixed chorus a cappella (1938)
- Koekoek for mixed chorus a cappella (1901); also for soprano and piano or orchestra
- Licht zij uw geest for male chorus a cappella (1890)
- Lofzang aan het vaderland for children's chorus and piano or orchestra (1901)
- Niet gedenken for mixed chorus a cappella (1938)
- Salve Regina for mixed chorus and orchestra (1895)
- Twee Coninckskinderen for male chorus a cappella (1921)
- Wierook for mixed chorus and piano (1900)

== Selected songs ==
- "Meisje met Uw Rozenmondje" ("Maiden with the Rosebud Mouth"; after Heine)
- "L'Ennemi" (after Baudelaire)
- "'t Is de Mandel" ("'Tis the Mandle", after Guido Gezelle)
- "'t Avondt" ("'Tis evening")
- "'t Groeit een blomken” (“A little flower grows”)
- "'t Pardoent" ("The Angelus")
- "'k Hoore tuitend hoornen" ("I hear the horns blowing")
- "O mocht ik" ("O might I")
- "Hoe lentig" ("How merry")
- "Meidag" ("May day")

== Sources ==
- Broeckx, Jan L., Lodewijk Mortelmans, een Van-Nu-en-Strakser der Muziek. Uitg. Standaard-Boekhandel, Antwerpen, 1945.
