= Jan Renier Snieders =

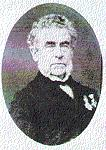
Jan Renier Snieders

Jan Renier Snieders (22 November 1812 in Bladel – 9 April 1888 in Turnhout), a brother of August Snieders, was a Belgian writer. He studied medicine in Leuven, and in 1838 he settled as a physician in Turnhout, where he did much to promote literature. For that purpose he founded the society De Dageraad. In 1912, the Hofstraat in Turnhout was renamed to Renier Sniedersstraat.

== Bibliography ==
- Het kind met den helm (1852)
- De meesterknecht (1855)
- Doctor Marcus (1858)
- De lelie van het gehucht (1860)
- Narda (1869)
- De geuzen in de Kempen (1875)
- Zonder God (1885)

== See also ==
- Flemish literature

== Sources ==
- Jan Renier Snieders (Dutch)
