= August Snieders =

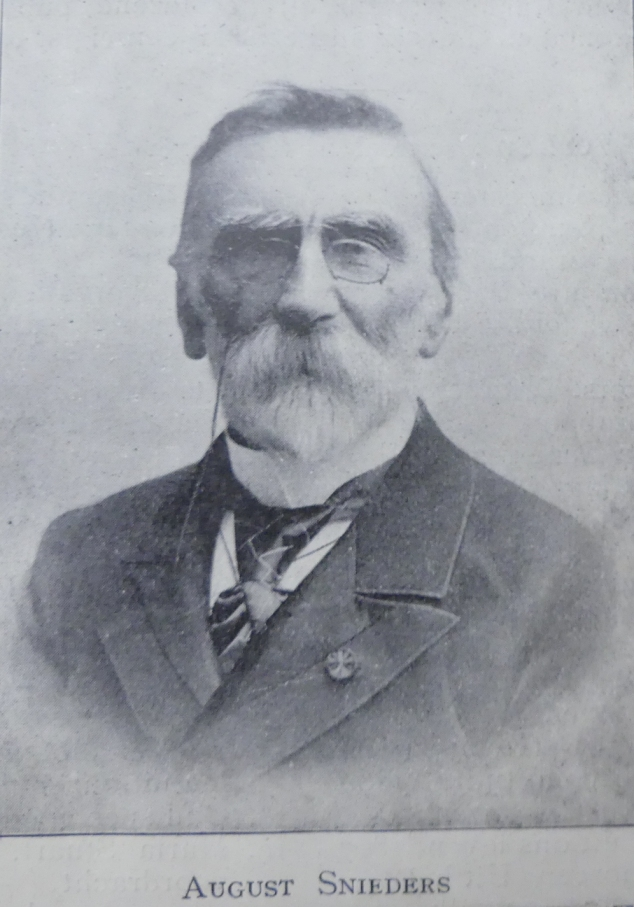
August Snieders

August Snieders (Bladel, 8 May 1825 – Brussels, 19 November 1904) was a Flemish journalist and writer. He started his career in 's-Hertogenbosch, but later moved to Antwerp. In 1845, he became editor of the newspaper Het Handelsblad, of which he was head editor from 1849 until 1899. Under his management Het Handelsblad became the most important Flemish newspaper and he himself the most authoritative Flemish journalist of the nineteenth century. He was a sound supporter of the catholic and Flemish ideals in Belgium. He was a brother of Jan Renier Snieders.

== Bibliography ==
- De arme schoolmeester (1851)
- De gasthuisnon (1855)
- Op den toren (1869)
- Oud speelgoed (1878)
- Alleen in de wereld (1880)
- De nachtraven (1884)
- Fata morgana (1887)
- Dit sijn Snideriën (1893)

== See also ==
- Flemish literature

== Sources ==
- G.J. van Bork en Pieter Jozias Verkruijsse, De Nederlandse en Vlaamse auteurs (1985).
