= List of choral festivals =

The following is an incomplete list of choral festivals, which encapsulates music festivals focused on choral music.

== Festivals ==
Festival name	Location	Years	Notes
Choralies	Vaison-la-Romaine, France	1951–present	French national festival featuring choirs from France and other countries, with performances and ateliers.
Europa Cantat	Europa	1961–present	Europe-wide festival with choir performances and ateliers (based on Choralies), in a different European city every edition.
International Stasys Šimkus choir competition	Klaipėda, Lithuania	1976–present	Competition is open to mixed, male, female, youth, children‘s choirs, sacred music, vocal ensembles, folk choirs.
Festival de Música Coral Renascentista Gil de Roca Sales	Brazil	2017–present	Choirs performing "a capella" renaissance music in Porto Alegre in honoring the conductor Gil de Roca Sales.
Festival de Coros del Fin del Mundo	Ushuaia, Argentina	2019–present	International Choral Festival. Concerts, workshops, conferences and forums with professional live broadcastings.
American Music Performance Invitational for Mixed Choirs	United States	2011–present	series of music festivals for top school choirs
Cincinnati May Festival	Cincinnati, United States	1873–present	festival roots go back to the 1840s
Cork International Choral Festival	Cork, Ireland	1954–present	features choirs from all over the world
Festival 500	St. John's, Canada	1997–2013	International biennial non-competitive choral music festival
Ihlombé!	Cape Town, Johannesburg, Pretoria, Soweto, South Africa	2009–present	Organized by Classical Movements
Intervarsity Choral Festival (Australia)	Australia	1950–present	members of university choirs from all state capitals of Australia meet for two weeks
InterVarsity Choral Festival (Canada)	Canada	1949–present	university choirs from Ontario and Quebec, Canada, meet up and perform a combined concert.
Corearte Festival	Barcelona, Spain	2007–present	International Corearte Choir Festival Barcelona, every year in October.
Lago di Garda Music Festival	Lago di Garda, Italy	2007–present	International Festival is non-competitive
MasterWorks Festival	Cedarville, United States	1997–present	month-long summer training program for classical performing artists
Nordic Student Singers' Summit	Scandinavia	1987–present	arranged every third year in a Nordic or Baltic country.
Ohrid Choir Festival	Ohrid, North Macedonia		held in the second half of August
PICCFEST	Eugene, United States	1998–present	treble choir festival held in conjunction with Oregon Bach Festival
Three Choirs Festival	United Kingdom	1719–present	Alternates between three churches
Universitas Cantat	Poznań, Poland	1998–present	International Festival of University Choirs is non-competitive
Nordic-Baltic Choral Festival	Europe	1995–2015	Music festival for Nordic and Baltic choirs. Nominally biennial, but only eight held in the period.
Musica Orbis Prague Festival	Prague, Czech Republic	2019–present	International festival for non-professional choirs and orchestras, every year at the turn of June and July.
World Peace Choral Festival	Vienna, Austria	2010–present	The festival includes competitive and non-competitive categories
Summa Cum Laude Festival	Vienna, Austria	2007–present	International Festival for Choirs and Orchestras, every year in early July with a competition in the Wiener Musikverein
International Habaneras and Polyphony Contest of Torrevieja	Torrevieja, Spain	1955–present	International annual choral competition held in July specialized in habaneras and polyphony. It also holds a junior contest.
World Choir Games	Worldwide	2000–present	Largest worldwide choral festival and competition held biennially in a preselected host city, organised by the Interkultur Foundation
UK Choir of the Year	London, England, United Kingdom	2026-present	National amateur choir competition for choirs of all genres from across the UK.
International Choral Fest Costa Rica for Peace	Costa Rica	2017–present	Annual non-competitive international choral festival centered on peace and cultural exchange.

== See also ==
- Choral music
- List of opera festivals
- List of maritime music festivals
- List of Christian music festivals
- List of folk festivals
