= European Youth Choir =

European youth project choir

- Choir
- Also known as: EYC
- Former name: EuroChoir, Eurochor
- Founded: 1982
- Affiliation: European Choral Association (from 2011); Federation of European Choral Associations (until 2010)

The European Youth Choir (EYC, formerly known as EuroChoir) is an international European choir, organised by the European Choral Association (ECA) since 2011 and by the Federation of European Choral Associations (AGEC) before that.

The EYC is a project choir, composed of around 60 young adults (aged between 18 and 30) from various different European countries. They are led by two conductors and a vocal coach. Each year they rehearse for a week during the summer holidays in one of the participating countries, ending with a series of concerts.

== History ==
As early as 1971, the AGEC decided to create a European youth choir, the first edition of which took place in Helsinki in 1975. Beyond that, a number of ad hoc youth choirs were organised in The Hague in 1975, in Llangollen in 1979 and 1980 and in Delft in 1980. In 1982 the modern iteration, was created under the name Eurochor.

The AGEC merged in 2011 to form the European Choral Association, which organized EuroChoir since then in collaboration with local partners. From 2025, the choir was renamed to European Youth Choir.

The EYC has performed at a number of choral festivals. In 2018 they performed their final concerts at Europa Cantat in Tallinn. The 2019 edition was held as a special atelier at the Choralies festival. In 2021 they once again performed at Europa Cantat, in Ljubljana this time. In 2026 they performed at the inaugural edition of Montpellier En Chanté, organised by the French chamber choir Êkhô.

== Editions ==
#	Year	City / cities	Countries	Conductor(s)
1	1982	Innsbruck	Austria	
2	1983	Hamburg	Germany	
3	1984	Vaduz	Liechtenstein	Juliaan Wilmots, József Maklári and Wolfgang Ress
4	1985	Bolzano	Italy	
	1986	Warsaw	Poland	Did not take place
5	1987	Arnhem	Netherlands	
6	1988	Berlin	Germany	
7	1989	Warschau	Poland	
8	1990	Zeillern / Linz	Austria	
9	1991	Arnhem	Netherlands	Oane Wierdsma and Géza Oberfrank
10	1992	Poeldijk	Netherlands	Jos Vranken
11	1993	Koksijde	Belgium	Vic Nees, Wolfgang Michaël Scheck and Juliaan Wilmots
12	1994	Gwatt / Interlaken	Switzerland	Werner Geissberger and Andé Ducret
13	1995	Trossingen / Freiburg	Germany	
14	1996	Budapest	Hungary	
15	1997	Bolzano	Italy	Erwin Ortner and Ottokar Procházka
16	1998	Graz	Austria	
17	1999	Waldfischbach	Germany	Fritz ter Wey
18	2000	Budapest / Visegrád	Hungary	
19	2001	Olsztyn	Poland	Benedykt Błoński
20	2002	Brugge	Belgium	Kaspar Putnins and Luc Anthonis
21	2003	Berlin	Germany	Kaspar Putnins and Luc Anthonis
22	2004	Lucerne	Switzerland	Kaspar Putnins and Rainer Held
23	2005	Vienna	Austria	Markus Obereder and Maria Goundorina
24	2006	Dresden	Germany	Gunter Berger and Kaspar Putnins
25	2007	Mechelen	Belgium	Kurt Bikkembergs and Lone Larsen
26	2008	Brixen	Italy	Erwin Ortner
27	2009	Pomáz	Hungary	Kurt Bikkembergs and Éva Kollár
28	2010	Niš	Serbia	Kurt Bikkembergs and Božidar Crnjanski
29	2011	Arco	Italy	Gary Graden and Enrico Miaroma
30	2012	Lomnice nad Popelkou	Czech Republic	Franz M. Herzog and Jaroslav Brych
31	2013	Pécs	Hungary	Tamás Lakner and Alessandro Cadario
32	2014	Saintes	France	Lone Larsen and Geoffroy Jourdain
	2015	Did not take place		
33	2016	San Vito al Tagliamento	Italy	Mikko Sidoroff and Lorenzo Donati
34	2017	Utrecht	Netherlands	Maria van Nieukerken and Lorenzo Donati
35	2018	Helsinki / Tallinn	Finland / Estonia	Maria van Nieukerken and Mikko Sidoroff
36	2019	Vaison-la-Romaine	France	Yuval Weinberg
	2020	Limerick	Ireland; cancelled due to COVID-19	Yuval Weinberg and Bernie Sherlock
37	2021	Ljubljana	Slovenia	Yuval Weinberg and Bernie Sherlock
38	2022	Basel / Flims / Rheinau	Switzerland	Yuval Weinberg and Marco Amherd
	2023	Did not take place		
39	2024	Varna / Sozopol / Sofia	Bulgaria	Donka Miteva and Marco Amherd
40	2025	Valencia	Spain	Donka Miteva and Francesc Valldecabres Sanmartín
41	2026	Montpellier	France	Donka Miteva and Pierre-Louis Delaporte
42	2027	Mannheim	Germany	TBA

== European Youth Choir (1994–2001) ==
Besides the EuroChoir organised by the AGEC at the time, there was also an earlier European Youth Choir organized by Europa Cantat – European Federation of Young Choirs (the other predecessor of the ECA). In 2002 it was eventually decided that the overlap of interest in it and the World Youth Choir was too big, so it was stopped that year.

Year	Session	Tour	Conductor
1994	Ghent, Belgium	Belgium, Germany and Denmark (at Europa Cantat in Herning)	Johan Duijck
1995	Saint-Léger-sous-Beuvray, France	France and Luxembourg	Johan Duijck
1996	Marktoberdorf, Germany	Germany, Switzerland, Austria and Italy	Johan Duijck
1997	Veszprém, Hungary	Hungary, Slovenia and Austria	Jordi Casas i Bayer
1998	Vitoria, Spain	Spain and France	Johannes Prinz
1999	Trossingen, Germany	Germany, Switzerland and France	Fred Sjöberg
2000	Saint-Léger-sous-Beuvray, France	France, Belgium and Germany (at World Expo in Hanover)	Frieder Bernius
2001	Hamar, Norway	Norway and Sweden	Carl Høgset

== Revoice ==
After the session in Pécs in 2013, a new choir was set up with the participants of that edition, named REVOICE!. The choir is led by the 5 conductors and EuroChoir alumni Fabien Aubé, Balázs Porcsalmy, Lucia Bérešová, Taum Karni and Xavier García Cardona and gives a number of concerts each year throughout Europe. In 2015, REVOICE collaborated with EuroChoir to perform at Expo 2015 in Milan.
