= Cantat =

Cantat may refer to:

- CANTAT, a submarine communications cable system
- Europa Cantat Festival, a European choir festival
  - Europa Cantat - European Federation of Young Choirs used to organise the festival
  - European Choral Association - Europa Cantat is its successor, organising the festival nowadays
  - Africa Cantat is a festival inspired by it held in Africa
  - America Cantat is a festival inspired by it held in the Americas
- Universitas Cantat

== People ==
- Bertrand Cantat (born 1964), French musician
- Isabelle Cantat (born 1974), French physicist
- Serge Cantat (born 1973), French mathematician
