= Rudi Tas =

Flemish composer, conductor, and organist

Rudi Tas [ˈrydi ˈtɑs] (born 1957 in Aalst, Belgium) is a Flemish award-winning composer of choral music, chamber music, orchestral music, conductor and organist. He studied at the Royal Conservatory of Brussels and Ghent.

In October 2017 he was elected as a member of the Royal Flemish Academy of Belgium for Science and the Arts.

His work is performed by Jan Michiels, Luk Vaes (piano), Symfonieorkest van Vlaanderen, VRT-Kamerkoor (Vic Nees), Mireille Capelle (sopraan), Ensemble ‘Spiegel’, Musa Horti (Peter Dejans), Stijn en Steven Kolacny, Paul Klinck, Johannes Moser (cellist), Susan Lamb, Edward Dusinberre, Pieter Wispelwey, Dale Warland Singers (US), Westminster Choir (Joe Miller), Commotio Oxford (Matthew Berry), University Chamber Singers (Julia Thorn), Ars Nova Singers (Thomas Ed. Morgan), Capella Amsterdam (Daniel Reuss), Salt Lake Vocal Artists (Brady Allred), Metropolitan Chorus of Tokyo and Voce Fidelis (Japan, Ko Matsushita), New Dublin Voices (Bernie Sherlock), and Peter Verhoyen, among others.

== Style ==
Tas combines modern compositional techniques with more traditional techniques or stylistic idioms such as tonality, neo-romanticism or neo-impressionism. A cantabile quality is always given pride of place. Rudi Tas’ music is permeated by influences from the past, from traditional and contemporary musical language. Traditional and contemporary elements are reconciled to one another in a seemingly natural way, resulting in a personal musical idiom with a convincing eloquence. His striving to strike a perfect balance between reason and emotion is supported by solid structures and a flexible, expressive but controlled lyricism. Within this polystylistic compositional approach, the eclectic element also continues to play a crucial role. 'The way in which Rudi Tas directs his career is based on a deep respect for tradition and solid knowledge of the more recent composing techniques. He chooses rather a more classic or a more contemporary style according to each individual commission. In his most important works he fuses these two polar opposites, which is only made possible by a solid professionalism and stylistic consciousness.’ This is how Vic Nees characterises the position of composer Rudi Tas in the musical landscape of Flanders. Respect for traditions, stylistic knowledge, pragmatism, economy of means, eclecticism, professionalism, a proper balance between emotion and form.

== Prizes ==
The number of works by Tas that have won awards, both nationally and internationally, is remarkable.

- Laureate of the Nausikäa-Composition Competition (Brussels 1979)
- ‘Flemish Multimedia Centre’ Award for chamber music-composition (1988)
- Flor Baron Peeters Prize for organ composition (1989)
- Provincial Prize of East Flanders (1992)
- European AGEC-nomination for his 'Symphonia da Requiem' (1992)
- B.A.P. prize awarded by SABAM (1993)
- European AGEC prize (1996) for his choral work Flowers of life
- International composition competition in Tours first prize (1998) for La chanson d’Eve
- Jef Van Hoof Prize (2001) for his Sonata for violin and piano
- Harmonic Originality Prize (2012) for his Pie Jesu (International Composition Competition IFCM)
- First Prize (2016) for his Ave Regina (International Choral Composition Competition Japan)

== Representative works ==
- Chamber music: String Quartet in memoriam Pau Casals (2002), Sonata for Violin and Piano (2000), Sonata for Oboe and Piano (2019-20), Sonata for Cello and Piano (2020), Sonata for Clarinet and Piano (2021-22)
- Vocal music: 4 motets for mixed choir (1995); La chanson d’ève, six songs for mixed choir (1997); Magnificat for solo soprano, 3 choir soloists and mixed choir (1998); Miserere for violoncello and mixed choir (1999); Ballet for voices for bariton, mixed choir, piano and flute (2001)); Salve Regina for soprano, violin and mixed choir (2004) Ave Regina for mixed choir SSAATTBB (2014)
- Orchestra: Symphonia da Requiem for soprano, reciter, solo chorus, mixed chorus and orchestra (1989–90); Silent Tears’ Symphony II for soprano and orchestra (2002-3)
