= NS3 =

NS3 or variants may refer to:

== Transportation ==
- Bukit Gombak MRT station, Singapore, station code NS3
- Takiyama Station, Kawanishi, Japan, station code NS03
- Kamonomiya Station (Saitama), Japan, station code NS03
- NS3, a British NS class airship
- New Shepard 3, a reusable sub-orbital launch vehicle

== Other uses ==
- Hepatitis C virus nonstructural protein 3
- Novelty seeking level 3, extravagance
- ns (simulator) version ns-3, computer network simulation software

== See also ==
- NSSS (disambiguation)
- NS (disambiguation)
- 3 (disambiguation)
