= Vic Nees =

Belgian composer and conductor (1936–2013)

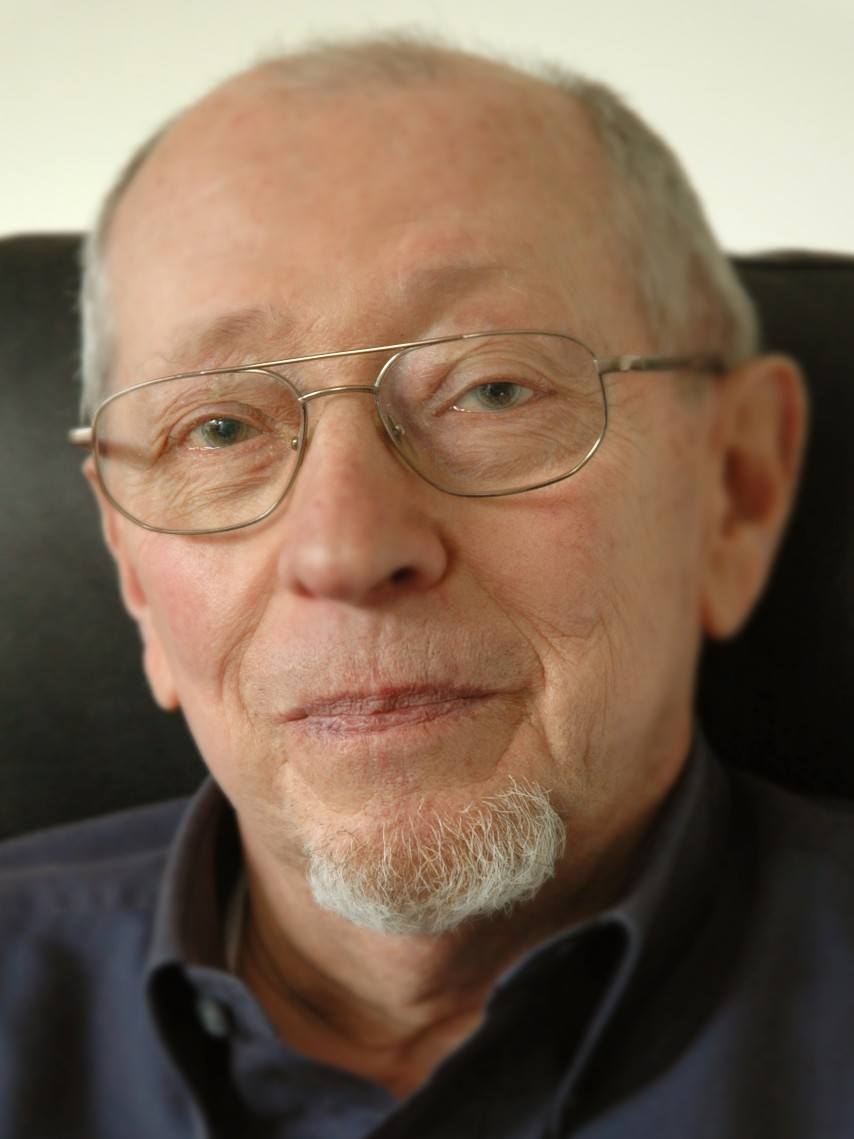
- Born: Victor Nees; 8 March 1936; Mechelen, Belgium
- Died: 14 March 2013 (aged 77); Vilvoorde, Belgium
- Occupations: Composer, conductor, musicologist

Victor Nees (Flemish pronunciation: [ne:s]) (8 March 1936 – 14 March 2013) was a Belgian (Flemish) composer (mainly of choral music), choral conductor, musicologist, and music educator.

== Early life and education ==
Vic Nees's father was Staf Nees, a famous Belgian carillonist, composer and organist. Vic Nees was born in Mechelen. His early musical education was intense but informal. He had piano and organ lessons, and after taking a preparatory course of solfège by Paul Gilson he became a member of the cathedral choir of St. Rumbold's, then conducted by Jules Van Nuffel, who greatly impressed him. Of equal importance in his education were his father's musical friends and acquaintances; they included Marinus de Jong, Jef van Hoof, and Arthur Meulemans.

But until 1956 he was mainly self-taught, using his father's library of scores and recordings. His interest in classical and romantic music was short-lived; very quickly it turned to the moderns of the day, like Milhaud, Hindemith, Bartók and especially Stravinsky; later also Britten.

As a young teenager he already substituted for his father, away on concert tours, at the organ of the Basilica of Our Lady of Hanswijk. His father also drafted him as an accompanist at rehearsals of a choir he conducted.

After one year of study at the Arts Faculty of the Katholieke Universiteit Leuven, he enrolled at the Antwerp Royal Flemish Conservatoire (now the Royal Conservatoire of Antwerp) in 1956, intending to become a qualified music teacher. The degree did not yet exist, but in Antwerp Marcel Andries, whom he had met at home, was offering a pioneering program of music education that greatly interested him. At the Conservatoire he obtained degrees in solfège, harmony, counterpoint, fugue and music history. But when the Belgian state refused to recognize Andries' music education program with a formal degree, he quit. He kept in touch with Andries, however, whose influence on a generation of Flemish choral conductors played a major role in changing the practice of choral music in Flanders, substantially broadening its repertoire and turning it away from late romanticism, and having his choir members sing in a cleaner, leaner manner.

== Career ==
=== Radio and conducting ===
In 1961, while doing his military service—at the time Belgium still had conscription—he passed an exam organized by the Belgische Radio- en Televisieomroep (BRT) [later split up in a francophone section and the Vlaamse Radio- en Televisieomroeporganisatie (VRT)] and he was hired as a music producer, responsible for both "light" and "serious" music. But when BRT started its classical channel, Radio 3 (now called Klara) on 1 October 1961, Nees was assigned to Radio 3, where he was to concentrate on classical music, and especially choral music. In this position he became acquainted with a great many new compositions, of which composers sent recordings to the radio, hoping they would be broadcast.

Meanwhile, he cut his teeth as a conductor. He founded the Vocal Ensemble Philippus de Monte in 1961—he'd conduct it for nine years—and from 1963 till 1965 he also led the Brussels Terkamerenkoor, consisting of professionals, members of the BRT choir. But dissatisfied as he was with his technique, he enrolled in Kurt Thomas's "Meisterkurs für Chorleitung" in Hamburg in 1964, from which he returned a laureate.

His reputation as a choral conductor grew fast. As early as the 1960s he was invited to sit on the juries of international choral competitions (see below, § 6). His work with choirs was also noted by Léonce Gras, the conductor of the BRT Philharmonic Orchestra, who occasionally asked him to rehearse the BRT choir when preparing works for choir and orchestra. Upon the sudden death of Jan Van Bouwel, the conductor of the BRT choir, on 1 December 1969, Vic Nees was asked to replace him temporarily. For a while Nees combined the functions of music producer and choral conductor, but on 19 October 1970, his appointment as conductor became permanent and full-time.

The BRT being a national institution, Nees's task included making music by Belgian (and later specifically Flemish composers). This suited Nees. He was interested in discovering little-known repertoire, and he could afford to ignore popular works, as he made mainly studio recordings and did not have to worry about filling a concert hall. At first he regularly programmed old music, too, but with the rise of ensembles specialized in that field, he mostly left it to them. Most of the little known repertoire he mined was 20th century music—Dewilde (2011), pp. 98–99 lists over three dozen living Flemish composers he programmed—and, surprisingly perhaps, 19th and early 20th century romanticism. His instinctive aversion to much romantic music was not, however, to romanticism itself, but to a type of romanticism that lacked artistic quality but was praised to the skies for pandering to nationalist and religious feelings. He unearthed and performed a great many works, shorter pieces as well as major works, of Flemish romantic composers whose scores exhibited real artistic quality, like Joseph Ryelandt's Maria, Arthur Wilford's Liebeslieder im Mai and Herbstwinde, Franz Uyttenhove's Stabat Mater, Karel Candael's Het Marialeven and Oscar Roels's Prometheus.

He was offered teaching positions at the conservatories of Antwerp and Brussels, but he refused them. As he preferred to maintain only his position as conductor of the radio choir, which gave him time to discover unknown works and above all to compose. This position, however, had its disadvantages because the radio choir was, and is, a chamber choir of professionals who are employees of the radio; they are civil servants. Motivating such a group, week after week, to sing mainly little known works or even premieres is hard work, especially when the choir was rarely able to sing for a public audience —it was only in the late 1980s that the choir started to regularly sing in concerts or went on tours. In 1991 the very existence of the choir was threatened; government economy measures suggested that the choir be merged with that of the Vlaamse Opera. From 1988 till the end of his career Nees got little support from Alexander Rahbari, at the time conductor of the Flemish Radio Orchestra, who was not very choir-minded. But Nees stayed for over 25 years.

His farewell concert was on 30 March 1996. He conducted his own Psalm 91 Bonum est confiteri (1988) and De Feesten van angst en pijn (The Feasts of Fear and Pain), Op. 96, an oratorio by Willem Kersters, the only work Nees ever commissioned while a conductor of the Radio Choir. In his position he would not favor any composer, but he did want his old friend Kersters to be part of this celebration.

Nees was only a permanent conductor for the Vocal Ensemble Philippus de Monte, the Terkamerenkoor and the BRT choir. But he conducted innumerable choirs as guest conductor.

=== Composer ===
Vic Nees considered himself a composer, first and foremost; being quoted having said "I conduct to make a living, and I live to compose."

Most of Nees's works were written with certain occasions or certain performers in mind. Being an experienced choral conductor, he never lost sight of the capabilities and limitations of his intended performers. But even his works explicitly intended for amateurs never descend to the level of "occasional" works. Nees owed his many commissions to the fact that professionals as well as amateurs commissioning a work from him knew that "The risk that they would receive a piece of work that would be qualitatively below par or technically unperformable [was] virtually non-existent. They also knew that they could expect the score of the work they commissioned to arrive months before the deadline. — The list of people or organizations that commissioned works by Nees includes BRT, the Cork International Choral Festival, the Escolania de Montserrat, the Europa Cantat festival, the Neerpelt European Music Festival for Young People (a dozen commissions), the Festival of Flanders, the Flemish Federation of Young Choirs, the International Choir Contest of Flanders-Maasmechelen, the Flemish province of the Society of Jesus, The Swingle Singers, the "Ministerie van de Vlaamse Gemeenschap" (Civil Service of the Flemish Community), and a great many amateur choirs, most of them Flemish, but also quite a few Dutch ones.

Nees wrote a great deal of sacred music, both for the liturgy and for the concert hall. It tends to be austere and to seek philosophical depth. So does some of his secular work, but it is mostly joyous, carefree and often full of subtle humor, irony and wordplay.

Nees's works are performed widely, both at home and abroad. His popularity in Flanders is such that one of his obituaries claimed that all choirs in Flanders have doubtless performed Vic Nees.

=== Musicology ===
His most important work as a musicologist was without doubt, his unearthing and preparing performance editions of forgotten works, "in which he often proved himself to be a better musicologist than many who boast the university degree". His performance editions were primarily meant for the BRT choir—his was musicological work that paid off. He also published a few musicological articles.

=== Music education ===
Nees never held a teaching position, but he constantly provided musical education, in a number of ways. He lectured, taught courses, gave masterclasses and workshops for various organizations, on many of whose committees he sat. Thanks to all these activities he was able to serve as a bridge between the worlds of the professional and the amateur choir. In this he was also helped by a long-running monthly BRT 3 program, Het koorleven in Vlaanderen (Choral Life in Flanders), which he was a driving force of.

The advice he gave privately may have been as influential. He was very approachable and he gave advice to whoever asked for it, informally over a good glass, in a serious conversation, in a letter or an e-mail.

He was often asked to sit on juries of musical competitions, not only in Flanders (where his jury "duties" were too numerous to count) and in Wallonia, but also abroad: in Den Bosch (1963), The Hague (1967), Middlesbrough (1968), Cork International Choral Festival (1971), Arezzo (1988), Neuchâtel and Aosta (2006); Cooremans (2011), p. 48 also lists Arnhem, Tours, Malta and Caracas without dates. All his jury reports were teaching moments.

Nees was a fine writer and he was frequently asked to provide introductions to works or texts by others, in memoriams or eulogies. He also wrote a number of columns about music, which were quite popular. Their tone was light-hearted, but his purpose was often serious: he used many of them to subtly lobby for Flemish music

== Musical style ==
There are some features that are characteristic of all of Nees's works. There is, first and foremost, his almost exclusive preference for writing vocal music. For Nees that preference implied that he treated the human voice with great respect. Obviously he was fastidious in his choice of texts: "He often spen[t] more time finding a suitable text than setting it." Some texts he commissioned. Three of his favorite text writers were Albert Boone, SJ, a musicologist and conductor, Mieke Martens, a poet and member of the BRT choir, and Jo Gisekin (pen name of Leentje Vandemeulebroecke), a well-known Flemish poet whose work has also been set to music by Ernest van der Eyken and Wilfried Westerlinck. But he also wrote quite a few texts himself. A fourth characteristic was that he always strove to achieve coherence of form.

Yet there are clear turning points in his career as a composer, the first around 1970, when he entered an experimental phase. He had begun his career by writing almost exclusively a cappella music for choirs, but around 1970 he added to his works solo voices, narrators and instrumental soloists, often in unusual combinations. He also began to write clusters, passages to be sung or spoken aleatorically, some of which even required changing the order of the syllables of the words.

Around 1975 he entered a phase that could be termed neoromantic. His interest in innovation lessened, that in lyricism and singable melody increased. He also took up composing art songs, a genre he had not practiced since his youth. But in 1978 he also wrote Lesbia, a resolutely dissonant and jazzy work written for The Swingle Singers.

His 1980 Magnificat—his most frequently performed work in the thirty years following its creation—heralds yet another period, which Nees himself termed "new simplicity". It brought a major return to diatonic writing, but also a first confrontation with minimal music, like that of Philip Glass and Steve Reich, and also with the music of Krzysztof Penderecki and Henryk Górecki. Minimal music was to have a major place in Nees's work from then on.

== Personal life ==
In 1960 he married Lea De Keersmaecker, with whom he had two daughters, Ineke and Saskia. His wife was his constant and conscientious archivist. Nees died Vilvoorde on 14 March 2013, aged 77.

== Works ==
His work list in Leens (2011), made with the help of Nees himself and that of his wife, lists all his works until 2013. The following lists gives the date of the composition, the title of the work, the forces for which it is written, and the (publication data).

Vocal works (selection)

This is a selection made by Leens, complemented by the published works discussed in Cooremans et al. (2011) and by a couple of recorded works.

- 1958 Psalm 23: Mijn herder is de Heer (Musicerende Jeugd 1968)
- 1959 Aloeëtte voghel clein SATB-divisi (Musicerende Jeugd 1968)
- 1960 Kleine geestelijke triptiek SATB (Halewijnstichting 1961)
- 1963 Looft de Heer in zijn heiligdom SATB (De Notenboom 1963)
- 1964 Fünf Motetten SATB-divisi (Möseler Verlag 1966)
- 1966 Ik kwam er lestmaal SATB (De Notenboom 1973) [10 settings of folk songs]
- 1967 European Stabat Mater alto and tenor soloists, SATB-divisi (Möseler Verlag 1969); Tusschen de twee SATB (De Notenboom 1968); Winterstilte SSA (De Notenboom 1968)
- 1968 Drie Gezelle-koorliederen SSAA (De Notenboom 1968); Wech op, wech op! SSAA (De Notenboom 1968) [10 settings of folk songs]
- 1969 Sur le pont d'Avignon soprano solo, SATB-divisi (De Notenboom 1986)
- 1970 Rachel soprano, alto and baritone soloists, SSATB-divisi, children's choir SSAA, child soloists, clarinet, harp or piano, double bass (De Notenboom 1970); Salve Regina SSAA-divisi (Musica Montserrat 1972); Vigilia de Pentecostes tenor solo, SATB-divisi, horn in F, organ (Musica Montserrat 1972); Ik ben van nergens en overal SATB (De Notenboom 1973) [10 settings of folk songs]
- 1972 Mammon 2 narrators, soprano solo, SATB-divisi, clarinet quartet, alto saxophone, piano, double bass, percussion (unpublished)
- 1973 Birds and flowers SATB, piccolo, flute, alto flute (unpublished)
- 1974 Als een duif op een dak SATB (Musicerende Jeugd 1974) [10 excerpts from the Psalms]
- 1975 Laudate pueri SATB (Harmonia 1976); Ave Regina caelorum SA (Europees Muziekfestival voor de Jeugd Neerpelt 1976)
- 1976 Seven Madrigals SATB (Musicerende Jeugd 1978)
- 1978 Lesbia SATB (unpublished); Beatus vir SATB (Harmonia 1979)
- 1979 Aurora lucis tenor solo, SA, unison children's choir, strings (De Notenboom 1996); Liedjes voor de slapelozen male, female and child's voice, SSAATTBB, piano (De Notenboom 1986)
- 1980 Magnificat soprano solo, SATB-divisi (Möseler Verlag 1981)
- 1981 Tweeklank van aarde en water SA-divisi, guitar (Musicerende Jeugd 1982)
- 1982 Gisekin-triptiek SATB (Algemeen Nederlands Zangverbond 1982); Veni sancte Spiritus SATB-divisi, brass quintet (De Notenboom 1986)
- 1983 Eight Japanese folk-songs baritone solo, SATB (De Notenboom 1984); Fortissimi SA (Europees Muziekfestival voor de Jeugd Neerpelt 1984); Stille Nacht TTBB (unpublished); Van as en ander schuim TTBB (De Notenboom 1987); Zoete merronton SATB, (De Notenboom 1983) [10 settings of folk songs]
- 1984 Rijke armoede van de trekharmonica SSAA-divisi (De Notenboom 1985); Teergeliefde in tien talen SATB (De Notenboom 1985) [10 settings in 10 languages of European folk songs]
- 1985 L'Escaut SSA (Europees Muziekfestival voor de Jeugd Neerpelt 1986)
- 1986 Nausikaä soprano and baritone soloists, SSA, traverso (De Notenboom 1986); Alma Redemptoris Mater SAATTB (De Notenboom 1987); Liermolen tenor solo, SA-divisi, harp (De Notenboom 1988) [suite of 15 European folk songs]
- 1987 Regina Coeli—Blue be it soprano solo, SSATB, celesta (De Notenboom 1988); Gloria Patri soprano solo, SSSATBB-divisi, chimes (De Notenboom 1987; Annie Bank 2010)
- 1988 Bonum est confiteri Domino tenor solo, SATB, harp, vibraphone, percussion (Möseler Verlag 1995)
- 1989 Memoria justi, soprano solo, SSAA (De Notenboom 1990); Anima Christi, tenor and baritone soloists, narrator, SATB, the audience, clarinet quartet, double bass, keyboards, percussion (De Notenboom 1994); Voetbalgavotte SATB (De Notenboom 1990)
- 1990 Nuestra Señora de la Soledad alto solo, SATB, viola (De Notenboom 1990)
- 1991 Cantemus SSA (De Notenboom 1991); Trois chansons de Hollande TTBB, (De Notenboom 1994); Upon G SSATTB (De Notenboom 1991)
- 1992 Twee liedjes over duiven SATB (De Notenboom 1992)
- 1994 E cantico canticorum fragmenta TTBB (Annie Bank 2010); Quatre chansons de Flandre SATB (De Notenboom 1995)
- 1995 Ego Flos SATB (De Notenboom 1996); Three Partsongs alto and tenor soloists, SSAA (De Notenboom 1996)
- 1996 Windharp SSA (Centrum voor Vocale Muziek 1998)
- 1997 Babel soprano solo, SSAA (Annie Bank 1999)
- 1998 Neusser Messe SSATTB, the congregation, trumpet, organ (Annie Bank 2003)
- 2000 Concerto per la beata Vergine SATB, oboe (Annie Bank 2000); De zee is een orkest SA, fourhanded piano (Carus Verlag 2005); Z children's choir SSA (Euprint 2004)
- 2001 Singet dem Herrn soprano solo, SATB-divisi (Annie Bank 2002)
- 2002 Stella Maris baritone solo, SSAA, accordion (Annie Bank 2004); Zwei Chorlieder soprano solo, SATB (Carus Verlag 2003)
- 2003 Trumpet Te Deum soprano solo, SATB-divisi, two trumpets (Annie Bank 2005)
- 2004 In diebus festivis cantica soprano and bass soloists, SATB-divisi (Euprint 2006)
- 2005 Aachener Ave Maria soprano solo, SATB-divisi (Annie Bank 2006); Trois Complaintes baritone solo, SATB (Annie Bank 2005)
- 2007 Requiem soprano and tenor soloists, SSAATTBB (Annie Bank 2009)
- 2008 Die beste Zeit im Jahr ist mein SSAA (Carus Verlag 2009) on Luther's song
- 2010 Zwei-Stoecklin-Chöre SSAA (Annie Bank 2010); Passio super Galli Cantu SSATBarB (Annie Bank 2011)
- 2012 Grimbergs Gloria SSATBB (Annie Bank 2012); Sporting Saraband SATB (Annie Bank 2012)

Instrumental works (complete)

- 1957 Capriccio piano (unpublished); Toccata piano (unpublished)
- 1962 Sonatine piano (unpublished); Varieties in trio over psalm 133 organ (De Crans 1970)
- 1975 Serenade voor strijkers strings (unpublished)
- 1989 2 x Baie brass quintet (unpublished)

In addition Leens (2011), pp. 125–127 lists dozens of titles of Gebrauchsmusik.

== Discography ==
CDs of music composed by Nees

- Anima Christi (Eufoda 1146)
- Trumpet Te Deum & Choral Works; also contains Singet dem Herrn and Neusser Messe (Phaedra 92042)
- A Tribute to Vic Nees; contains Ego Flos, Concerto per la beata Vergine, Eight Japanese folk-songs and Nausikaä (Phaedra 92035)
- Sacred Choral Works; contains Gloria Patri, Regina Coeli—Blue be it, Bonum est confiteri Domino, Nuestra Señora de la Soledad and Veni sancte Spiritus (René Gailly 92029)
- Requiem; also contains De zee is een orkest and Tweeklank van aarde en water (Gents Madrigaalkoor)
- Nees by Nees; contains Seven Madrigals, Twee liedjes over duiven, Upon G, Rijke armoede van de trekharmonica, L'Escaut, Liedjes voor de slapelozen and Mammon (Davidsfonds)

Leens lists another 12 CDs containing works by him as well as by others, and 6 LPs.

CDs of music by others conducted by Vic Nees

- Peter Benoit Vingt motets (Klara)
- Flor Peeters Missa Festiva, Op. 62 (Klara)
- Willem Kersters Choral Music (René Gailly 92032)
- Arthur Wilford Choral Works – Chamber Music (René Gailly 92018)

== Prizes and honors ==
- 1960 Prize Albert de Vleeshouwer, awarded by the Antwerp conservatory, for Kleine geestelijke triptiek (Short Spiritual Triptych)
- 1973 Eugène Baie I Prize for his choral compositions.
- 1986 Knight, and in 2005, Grand Officer in the Order of Leopold
- 1990 AGEC Prize for his composition Regina Coeli – Blue be it (1988).
- 1993 "Fuga Trofee", awarded by the Union of Belgian Composers.
- 1994 Corresponding, and in 1998 Ordinary, Member of the Royal Flemish Academy of Belgium for Science and the Arts
- 1995 ANV-Visser Neerlandia Prize "for the totality of his oeuvre as a composer, and his efforts to disseminate Flemish and Dutch music"
- 1995 Joost van den Vondelprijs
- 2000 Medal of the Marnixring (a Flemish service club).
- 2003 Snepvangers Prize, awarded by the Association of the Belgian musical press
- 2004 Lifetime Achievement Award of Klara, the classical-music channel of the Vlaamse Radio- en Televisieomroep.
- 2012 Honorary citizen of Grimbergen, the town where he lived from 1968 until his death.
- In 2020 Koor&Stem, Componisten Archipel Vlaanderen, the Flemish Radio Choir and the European Music Festival for Young People organized a Vic Nees Composition Competition, sponsored by SABAM. A second edition is being organized in 2022.

== Sources ==
- Cooremans, Kamiel; Dewilde, Jan; Leens, Roger; Theuwissen, Katelijne (2011). O Song: Vic Nees, portret van een koorcomponist. Leuven: Davidsfonds and Koor&Stem). ISBN 9789058267658. (in Dutch, with English summaries)
- Cooremans, Kamiel. "Vic Nees: Leven en werk". In Cooremans et al. (2011), pp. 13–57. (English summary: pp.58–63)
- Dewilde, Jan. "Vic Nees als dirigent, musicoloog en inspirator: Een klinkend voorbeeld". In Cooremans et al. (2011), pp. 85–108. (English summary: pp. 109–110)
- Leens, Roger. "'Oeuvrecatalogus Vic Nees' and 'Discografie'". In Cooremans et al. (2011), pp. 111–149 and 150–159. (English introduction 113–114)
- Van Holen, Jaak (1995). "Musicus Vic Nees: Joost van den Vondelprijs 1995". Vlaanderen (in Dutch). 44: 247.
