= New Dublin Voices =

Irish chamber choir

- New Dublin Voices

Background information
- Origin: Dublin, Ireland
- Genre: Choral
- Years active: 2005–present
- Members: Conductor; Bernie Sherlock
- Website: www.newdublinvoices.com

New Dublin Voices, an award-winning chamber choir based in Dublin, Ireland, was founded by conductor Bernie Sherlock in October 2005. New Dublin Voices, whose concerts range in style and period from medieval to contemporary, focuses on exploring the music of living composers and has given many Irish premières, as well as numerous world premières of works by Irish composers. As well as giving concerts, New Dublin Voices is a regular participant in competitions, both internationally and at home in Ireland. The singers who make up New Dublin Voices come from many backgrounds, sharing high levels of experience and musicianship, a commitment to attracting new audiences and a love of performing choral music.

== Festivals ==
New Dublin Voices is regularly engaged to present concerts at prestigious international festivals at home and abroad. This has seen them tour extensively across Provence, Normandy, Burgundy and Catalonia in recent years. Highlights include:

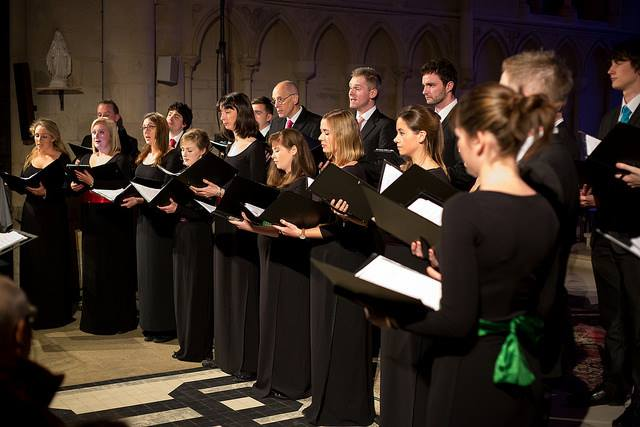
New Dublin Voices performing at Polyfollia, France, 2014

- Northern Ireland: 13th City of Derry International Choir Festival, 2025
- Germany: 7th Internationale Chorbiennale Aachen, 2023
- England: 33rd Association of British Choral Directors Annual Convention, Leeds, 2018
- Spain: 11th World Symposium on Choral Music, Barcelona, 2017
- Spain: 8th Setmana Cantant (Singing Week), Tarragona, 2017
- Ireland: 63rd Cork International Choral Festival, 2017
- USA: 2nd World Choral Festival, Kansas City, 2016
- France: 23rd Festival des Chœurs Lauréats, Provence, 2015
- France: 6th Polyfollia – The World Showcase and Marketplace for Choral Singing, Normandy, 2014
- Switzerland: 9th European Festival of Youth Choirs, Basel, 2014
- France: Musique en Morvan, Burgundy, 2012

== Awards ==
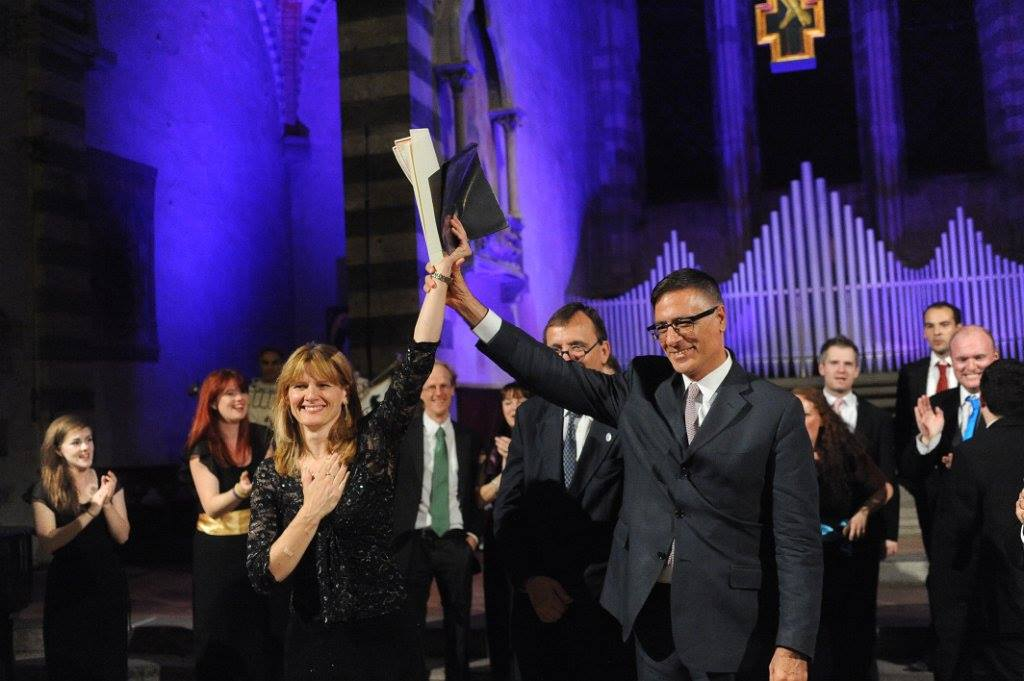
Bernie accepting first place in the Grand Prix, Arezzo, 2013

- Latvia: 2nd prize overall and the Special Prize for the best performance of the compulsory composition (Song of Innocence by Arturs Maskats), at the 8th International Baltic Sea Choir Competition in Jūrmala, 2025
- Bulgaria: 3rd prize in the Chamber Choirs category and 3rd prize in the Mixed Choirs category, at the 42nd International Choir Competition "Prof. Georgi Dimitrov" in Varna, 2024
- Poland: Grand Prix for the best choir, 1st prize and Golden Diploma in the Sacred Music category, 1st prize and Golden Diploma in the Mixed Choirs category, and the Special Prize for distinction for conductor (Bernie Sherlock), at the 13th International Krakow Choir Festival "Cracovia Cantans", 2024
- Italy: 1st prize in the Secular Music Programme category, 2nd prize in the Sacred Music Programme category, and the Special Prize for best contemporary programmes and performances, at the 71st Concorso Polifonico Internazionale "Guido d'Arezzo", 2023
- Wales: 2nd prize in the Mixed Choirs category, Gwobr Jayne Davies Prize for most outstanding conductor (Bernie Sherlock), at the Llangollen International Musical Eisteddfod, 2022
- Northern Ireland: 1st prize in the International Competition, at the 7th City of Derry International Choir Festival, 2019
- Germany: 3rd prize overall and the Pro Musica Viva - Maria Strecker-Daelen Prize to a conductor (Bernie Sherlock) for the best interpretation of a contemporary choral work (Ave Regina by Rudi Tas), at the 16th International Chamber Choir Competition Marktoberdorf, 2019
- Hungary: 1st prize in the Mixed Choirs category, Special Prize for best conductor (Bernie Sherlock), and the Special Prize for the best interpretation of a contemporary piece (Under-Song by Seán Doherty (composer)), at the 28th Béla Bartók International Choir Competition in Debrecen, 2018
- Latvia: Grand Prix at the 2nd International Baltic Sea Choir Competition in Jūrmala, 2017
- Finland: 2nd prize overall and the Special Prize for best interpretation of the set work (Mais je suis mort by Riikka Talvitie), at the 5th International Harald Andersén Chamber Choir Competition in Helsinki, 2016
- France: Prix pour une œuvre de création (In te, Christe by Seán Doherty (composer)), at the 45th Florilège Vocal de Tours, 2016
- Ireland: 1st prize in the Fleischmann International Trophy Competition, 2nd prize in Ireland’s Choir of the Year, the Perpetual Trophy for the Performance of Irish Contemporary Choral Music, and the International Jury Award, at the 61st Cork International Choral Festival, 2015
- Slovenia: 3rd prize overall and the Special Prize for best interpretation of the set work, at the 13th International Choral Competition Gallus in Maribor, 2015
- England: Audience Prize at the 1st London International A Cappella Choir Competition, 2014
- Hungary: finalist in the 26th European Grand Prix for Choral Singing in Debrecen, 2014
- Northern Ireland: 2nd prize in the International Competition at the 1st City of Derry International Choir Festival, 2013
- Italy: Gran Premio Città di Arezzo and 1st prize in the Vocal Ensembles category, at the 61st Concorso Polifonico Internazionale "Guido d'Arezzo", 2013
- Ireland: 2nd prize in the Fleischmann International Trophy Competition, 1st prize in Ireland’s Choir of the Year, and the Perpetual Trophy for the Performance of Irish Contemporary Choral Music, at the 59th Cork International Choral Festival, 2013
- Spain: 3rd prize in the Polyphony category at the 44th Tolosako Abesbatza Lehiaketa, 2012
- Belgium: Six prizes, including Choir of the Festival, at the 11th International Choir Contest of Flanders-Maasmechelen, 2011
- Italy: Three prizes, including 1st prize in the Renaissance category, at the 58th Concorso Polifonico Internazionale "Guido d'Arezzo", 2010
- Ireland: 2nd prize in the Fleischmann International Trophy Competition, the Schuman/Europe Award, and the International Jury Award, at the 56th Cork International Choral Festival, 2010
- Finland: 3rd prize overall and the Special Prize for best interpretation of the set work (Laudatio Domini by Joonas Kokkonen), at the 3rd International Harald Andersén Chamber Choir Competition in Helsinki, 2009
- Germany: 3rd prize overall at the 11th International Chamber Choir Competition Marktoberdorf, 2009
- Hungary: Grand Prix and the Interkultur Special Prize for best conductor (Bernie Sherlock) at the 12th Budapest International Choir Competition, 2009
- France: Prix pour une œuvre de création (Sea Swell by Enda Bates), at the 37th Florilège Vocal de Tours, 2008

== Discography ==
- Snow Dance for the Dead - Choral Music by Seán Doherty, released 21 February 2025
- Make We Merry, released 01 December 2017
- Music from Ireland, released 13 December 2014
- Christmas with New Dublin Voices, released 20 November 2010
- Something Beginning with B, released 24 September 2010

== Other work ==
As well as concerts and competitions, New Dublin Voices maintains a busy calendar of other activities including fund-raising – most recently charity concerts for Pakistan flood relief with Concern Worldwide, and for the PREDA Foundation which cares for neglected children in the Philippines

The choir makes occasional television appearances – notably appearing with The Priests in their debut Armagh concert broadcast nationwide in the US and Canada, and on RTÉ's Off the Rails, The Den, and others.

The choir works regularly with both the RTÉ National Symphony Orchestra and the RTÉ Concert Orchestra and performs at various special public events, including the official launch in October 2008 of the Irish Arts Council's first ever policy document for choral music, Raising Your Voice.

In 2016, Sony Classical released the original motion picture soundtrack for The Letters, a Hollywood feature film about the life of Mother Teresa of Calcutta. The album features New Dublin Voices and the Macedonian Radio Symphony Orchestra performing the film's original music composed by Ciarán Hope as well as Leona Lewis performing the song "Run" by Snow Patrol.

== World premieres ==
- Peperit virgo (SATB) by Seán Doherty
- I Hear an Army by Seán Doherty
- Adam’s Rib by Ian Wilson
- Metamorphosis by Ádám Brandenburg
- Laughing Song by Gerard López Boada
- Donna m’apparve by Monica Nasti
- In the Fields by Richard Barnard
- Aedh Wishes for the Cloths of Heaven by Ben Heneghan
- Jubilate Deo by Motshwane Pege
- Wild Geese by Alex Ryan
- Agnus Dei by Miklós Csemiczky
- When You Are Old by Áine Mallon
- White Birds by Laura Hawley
- her anxiety by David Coonan
- Buachaill ón Éirne arranged by Cyril Murphy
- The Mother of God by Anselm McDonnell
- Beidh Aonach Amárach arranged by Eoin Conway
- O Curlew by Jonathan Nangle
- Elemental Powers by Roxanna Panufnik
- Holy Sonnet by Marco Tutino
- Cumeen Wood by James Pilkington
- Skinny Dipping by Elaine Agnew
- The Island Itself by Sarah Quartel
- Rachel’s Lament by Ben Hanlon
- I Tell the Truth by Joan Szymko
- Waking by Tadeja Vulc
- as heather curves by Nicola LeFanu
- Winter in Inis Meáin by Linda Buckley
- I Wandered Lonely as a Cloud by Alex Ryan
- Solvere volo by Levente Gyöngyösi
- On Raglan Road arranged by Eoin Conway
- White Christmas arranged by Eoin Conway
- Home by Rudi Tas
- Nothing But Mud by Joan Szymko
- Time by Seán Doherty
- Prayer for those who shall return by Paweł Łukaszewski
- Comrades by Eoghan Desmond
- War - A Soldier’s Grave by Ēriks Ešenvalds
- Bean Pháidín arranged by Seán Doherty
- We Three Kings arranged by Eoin Conway
- Luminous Star by Jonathan Nangle
- Little Girl Blue arranged by Seán Doherty
- The Stolen Child by Jaakko Mäntyjärvi
- The Second Coming by Alex Ryan
- Noel: Christmas Eve 1913 by Jaakko Mäntyjärvi
- Stille Nacht arranged by Eoin Conway
- The Christmas Song arranged by Eoin Conway
- The Darkest Midnight by Eoghan Desmond
- Love Came Down at Christmas by Mark Armstrong
- We are the Music-Makers by Colman Pearce
- Psalmus by Péter Louis van Dijk
- Snow Dance for the Dead by Seán Doherty
- Christmas Time is Here arranged by Eoin Conway
- Adam Lay yBounden by Eoghan Desmond
- There is no Rose by Eoghan Desmond
- Can it be True? by Seán Doherty
- Our Christmas Bells Ring by Mark Armstrong
- The Same Stream of Life by Vytautas Miškinis
- Northwoods by Ola Gjeilo
- In te, Christe by Seán Doherty
- Down by the Salley Gardens arranged by Mark Armstrong
- O Holy Night arranged by Eoin Conway
- The Spire by Stephen Gardner
- The Smock Race at Finglas by Stephen Gardner
- Aedh Wishes for the Cloths of Heaven by Eoghan Desmond
- Obsessive Choral Disorder by Daniel McDermott
- For the Love of Quiet Things by Jonathan Nangle
- Blackberry Picking by Éna Brennan
- Sing No More by Hugh Martin Boyle
- Wave by Richard Gill
- Salve Regina by Ryan Molloy
- Dreams by Seán Doherty
- Would like to Meet by Peter Leavy
- On the Strand by David Collier
- Bubbles… by Donal Mac Erlaine
- Arrgh by Kian Geiselbrechtinger
- To One Dead by Patrick Connolly
- Song for Billie Holiday by Anna Clifford
- Dancing on the Threshold by David Bremner
- All I Want for Christmas is You arranged by Eoin Conway
- Cantate Canticum Novum by Dan Forrest
- In the Bleak Midwinter by Alex Ryan
- The Wexford Carol arranged by Eoin Mulvany
- Mr. Blue Sky arranged by Eoin Mulvany
- God Rest You Merry, Gentlemen arranged by Eoin Conway
- Coventry Carol arranged by Jonathan Nangle
- The Savior must have been by Stephen Gardner
- Love is Stronger by Ben Hanlon
- Pauper's Lament/A Stealing Sadness by Enda Bates
- O frondens virga by Ben Hanlon
- Sea Swell by Enda Bates
- Bealach Conglais by Ian Wilson
- Curoo Curoo by Elaine Agnew
- Fall Approaches by Linda Buckley
- Three Meditations for Twenty Voices by Daniel Jacobson
- Lux Aeterna by Ian McDonnell
- Upon His Departure Hence by Michael Fleming
- ...[and] in the end, with so much swelling silence, why bother to make sounds at all? by Jonathan Nangle

== Press Quotes ==
- "...a soft-textured beauty...New Dublin Voices has this in abundance." - Michael Dervan, The Irish Times
- "My first impulse after playing Make We Merry...was to play it all again. It has 18 tracks...and bubbles with energy and wit." - Richard Morrison, The Times (UK)
- "...the choral effect being simply breathtaking throughout in its refined beauty." - Dick O'Riordan, The Sunday Business Post

== See also ==
- Bernie Sherlock
