= International Federation for Choral Music =

International Federation for Choral Music (IFCM) is an international association founded in 1982 to facilitate communication and exchange between choral musicians throughout the world.

IFCM has around 900 members from all continents. The members are individuals, choirs, organisations or companies. Through the organisations and choirs IFCM plays a role in choral music and choral events in the world. On the International Music Council of the UNESCO IFCM is the official representative of choral music.

== Purposes ==
The purposes are fulfilled mainly through the following projects:

- African Children Sing!
- Musica International (Choral music database)
- ChoralNet
- Conductors without borders
- International Centre for Choral Music in Namur, Belgium
- Master classes
- OpusChoral
- Regional symposia
- Songbridge
- World Choral Census
- International Choral Bulletin
- World day of Choral singing
- World symposium on Choral music
- World Symposium 2011 in Puerto Madryn, Argentina
- World Chamber Choir
- World Youth Choir
- Youth Committee

== Organizations ==
IFCM was founded by seven national and international choral organizations from five continents. These are:

- American Choral Directors Association (United States of America)
- À Cœur Joie International (France)
- Arbeitsgemeinschaft Europäischer Chorverbände (Europe)
- Asociación Interamericana de Directores de Coros (Latin America)
- Europa Cantat - Federation Européenne des Jeunes Chorales (Europe)
- Japan Choral Association (Japan)
- Korforum Nordisk Korforum (Scandinavia)
