= List of compositions by Seán Doherty =

This is a list of compositions by Seán Doherty.

== Chamber ==
- The Devil's Dream String Quartet No.3 (2015)
- Arch for String Quartet (2014)
- Fugue State for flute, clarinet, cello and piano (2013)
- Retreat for String Quartet (2013)
- Springar For voice flute, viola d’amore, piccolo, cello, and harpsichord (2013)
- Pitched Battle for flute, clarinet, piano, violin and cello (2012)

== Choral ==
- A Nywe Werk for a cappella choir (SSAATTBB) (2014)
- Under-Song for a cappella choir (SSAATTBB) (2014)
- Dreams for a cappella choir (SATB) (2014)
- Easter Wings for a cappella choir and organ (SSAATTBB) (2013)
- Et Clamabant for a cappella choir (SATB) (2013)
- Jubilate Deo for a cappella choir and organ (SATB) (2012)
- Doire for a cappella choir (SATB) (2012)

== Stage ==
- Love has no Why for soloist, singers and string quartet (2013)
- Totalled, opera (2013)
- Number Seven for tenor, harp/piano and chorus (2012)

== Solo ==
- Divisions for violin (2015)
- Long after sudden flash for piano (2011)

== Orchestral ==
- Hive Mind for orchestra (2015)
