= Conductors Without Borders =

Conductors Without Borders (CWB), is an international development programme for conductors and choral leaders who lack access to professional education, mentorship or guidance. The programme shall create insightful leadership committed to the social values of choral singing.

The programme was founded in 2007, hosted and supported by the International Federation for Choral Music (IFCM) and under the patronage of the composer Alberto Grau in Venezuela. It engages conductors who want to assist with the training of choral conductors and the improvement of choral singing in developing countries and regions.

== See also ==
- Without Borders
