= Seán Doherty (composer) =

Irish composer

- Born: 1987 (age 38–39); Derry, Northern Ireland
- Occupation: Composer
- Works: List of compositions
- Website: seandohertymusic.co.uk

Seán Doherty (born 1987) is a composer, musicologist and singer from Derry, Northern Ireland.

== Life ==
Doherty was born in Derry, Northern Ireland, where he was educated at St Eugene's primary school and Lumen Christi College. He read music at St John's College, Cambridge, and was awarded a PhD from Trinity College, Dublin, on submission of a thesis entitled ‘Solfaing: The History of Four-Syllable Solmization to the Present Day’. Doherty is a lecturer in music at Dublin City University. He is a member of the acclaimed Irish choir New Dublin Voices.

Doherty has won the Feis Ceoil choral composition four times, the Choir & Organ Magazine composition competition twice, the West Cork Chamber Music Festival ‘Young Composers’ Bursary’ twice, the Jerome Hynes composition award, the St Giles' Cathedral, Edinburgh composition competition, and the Fragments composition award in association Historic Scotland. His music has been performed by the Kensington Symphony Orchestra (London), the Vanbrugh Quartet, the choir of Merton College, Oxford, the choir of Salisbury Cathedral, the Grant Park Music Festival Chorus (Chicago); the Ulster Orchestra and the Belfast Philharmonic Kids' Choirs, the National Youth Choir of Scotland, the Mornington Singers (Dublin), Laetare Vocal Ensemble (Dublin), the Baroque violinist Claire Duff, the pianist Fiachra Garvey, and the soprano Caroline Melzer.

Doherty is a member of the Irish Composers' Collective and the Association of Irish Composers, and is represented by the Contemporary Music Centre, Ireland.

== Critical reception and recognition ==
Doherty’s work has received sustained critical attention in Irish and international music journalism. Reviewing Snow Dance for the Dead, recorded by New Dublin Voices, The Journal of Music described his compositional voice as marked by a close engagement with text and historical context, noting the way musical structure is shaped by poetic source material and ethical themes.

Chamber works have also been widely reviewed. Writing in The Irish Times in the context of the West Cork Chamber Music Festival, Michael Dervan identified Doherty’s string quartet The Devil’s Dream as a work of “devilish intensity and gripping focus”. Similar assessments appeared in the Irish Examiner, where the work was described as a “significant addition to the contemporary quartet repertoire”.

International coverage has included reviews in outlets such as The Arts Desk and the Irish Echo, both of which commented on Doherty’s choral writing for its clarity of texture and expressive restraint.
