= European Choral Association =

European choral organisation

European Choral Association - Europa Cantat
- Abbreviation: ECA
- Formation: 1955 (AGEC); 1963 (EC-EFYC); 2011 (merger)
- Merger of: Federation of European Choral Associations; Europa Cantat - European Federation of Young Choirs
- Location: Bonn, Germany
- Region served: Europe
- President: Dermot O'Callaghan
- Affiliations: European Music Council; International Federation for Choral Music
- Website: europeanchoralassociation.org

The European Choral Association - Europa Cantat is a European choral organisation formed in 2011 from the merger of the Federation of European Choral Associations (AGEC, founded 1955) and Europa Cantat - European Federation of Young Choirs (EC-EFYC, founded 9 February 1963). It is the biggest European choral organisation with members in 40 European countries and 10 countries outside of Europe. It is a network of choir organisations. The association claims to directly represent more than 2.5 million of individuals, and indirectly reach 37 million.

The European Choral Association aims to improve the quality of vocal music, supporting cultural diversity and promoting cultural exchange within Europe. It encourages the mobility of conductors, composers and singers, and the creation of innovative contemporary vocal music. It aims to make its activities accessible to young people from all European countries including those who are geographically, economically, socially or otherwise disadvantaged, with a special focus on young people under 27.

== History ==
=== Federation of European Choral Associations ===
The Federation of European Choral Associations (Arbeitsgemeinschaft Europäischer Chorverbände in German, AGEC for short) was an umbrella organisation for European choral federations. It was founded in Strasbourg in 1955 and had its headquarters in Antwerp. The aim of the AGEC was to coordinate cooperation between its member federations. The AGEC was governed by a general assembly chaired by an international presidium. A music committee advised the general assembly on all musical matters.

One of the AGEC’s projects was the annual EuroChoir. It was held in various countries, with the respective musical culture of each country forming the main theme of the events. It also organised the European Festival Choir. The AGEC also acted as patron for other international choral events, competitions, training courses and conferences of particular significance. AGEC also awarded an annual composition prize, with the aim of promoting contemporary choral composition.

=== Europa Cantat - European Federation of Young Choirs ===
Europa Cantat - European Federation of Young Choirs (EC-EFYC) was a federation for youth choirs founded in 1963 in the aftermath of World War II to promote international exchange. The eponymous festival Europa Cantat was set up, based on the national French choral festival Choralies.

Later EC-EFYC also started organising other events, including their own European Youth Choir, other singing weeks and competitions.

== Friends of the European Choral Association ==
The Friends of the European Choral Association is an association founded in 2011 to support the European Choral Association. Since 2021, individuals and choirs can no longer be direct members of the ECA. Instead, they can be members of the Friends of the European Choral Association. The Friends organises fundraising activities and the Noël Minet Fund, which helps fund participation in some of the ECA’s events for young people with limited resources.

== Activities ==
The association currently (co-)organizes the following events:

- Europa Cantat festival, every three years
- Europa Cantat Junior festival, for children's, girls' and boys' choirs
- Leading Voices, event for professionals in the choir world
- European Youth Choir for singers 18 to 30, formerly known as EuroChoir
- World Youth Choir for selected young singers 18 to 27
- Membership weekend

Every year they also collaborate on a number of external events that are organised under their label, and they maintain a calendar with more choral events by other organisations.

Besides those, they also run a number of (EU-sponsored) projects, workshops, financial support schemes and awards.
