= NSSS =

NSSS may refer to:

- The National Science Summer School
- Nordic Student Singers’ Summit
- Nuclear Steam Supply System, the main system of a nuclear power plant that includes the nuclear reactor.
- Non-sewered sanitation system
