= Bernie Sherlock =

- Origin: Kells, County Kilkenny, Ireland
- Genre: Choral
- Occupation: Conductor

Bernie Sherlock is an Irish choral conductor, adjudicator, teacher, and lecturer in music.

== Biography ==
Bernie Sherlock is an Irish conductor of choral music who is conductor of the multi-award-winning chamber choir New Dublin Voices which she founded in 2005, and of the Culwick Choral Society.

She received her training in choral conducting from Ildikó Herboly Kocsár and Peter Erdei during two years of study in Hungary. She subsequently continued her studies with Gerhard Markson and earned a master's in conducting from NUI Maynooth. Sherlock has extensive experience directing a wide range of choirs. She was for ten years the choral director at the Dublin Institute of Technology Conservatory of Music & Drama, during which time she led the DIT Chamber Choir to numerous first prizes at the Cork International Choral Festival and at Dublin Feis Ceoil. Under Sherlock's direction the chamber choir was the conservatory's first ensemble to record a CD when Carols for Christmas was released to great acclaim in December 2000. She also conducted the larger DIT Choral Society in performances of the mainstream oratorio repertoire. In 2007, she was appointed musical director of the Culwick Choral Society in 2007, the oldest choir of its type in Ireland, with which she continues to explore the major repertoire for large choir. Her choir New Dublin Voices has established itself as one of Ireland's leading chamber choirs since its formation in 2005. Known for its television, radio and recording work, and for its innovative concert programming, New Dublin Voices is also prominent on the international competition circuit with invitations to prestigious festivals in France, Switzerland, Spain, and the US, as well as major prizes from competitions in France, Germany, Hungary, Finland and Italy, including the Grand Prix at the 2009 Budapest International Choir Competition where Sherlock was also awarded the prize for best conductor. New Dublin Voices was awarded 1st prize in the 2015 Fleischmann International Competition at the Cork International Choral Festival where Sherlock also won the International Jury Award. New Dublin Voices was the 2010 winner of the RTE lyric fm Choirs for Christmas Competition and a multiple prize-winner at the 2011 International Choir Contest of Flanders-Maasmechelen (Belgium).

Sherlock is a lecturer in music at the Dublin Institute of Technology Conservatory of Music and Drama. She also lectured for many years in the School of Music, Trinity College, Dublin, where she was conductor of the Dublin University Choral Society from 1999 until 2008. Under her direction the choir released its first CD, a recording of Under No Circumstances by the late Brian Boydell. Sherlock has an international profile as an adjudicator, choral animateur, teacher of conducting and aural training and she has won several international prizes for her conducting and interpretation. She is artistic director of educational programmes for the Association of Irish Choirs including the annual Conducting Summer School, and is the Irish representative on the World Choir Council.

== New Dublin Voices ==
Sherlock founded New Dublin Voices, an international award-winning chamber choir based in Dublin, in October 2005.

== Other Choirs ==
=== D.I.T. Chamber Choir ===
The DIT Chamber Choir comprises full-time Conservatory music students and performs a diverse repertoire ranging from 16th-century madrigals to contemporary music.

Under the directorship of Sherlock from 1995 to 2005, the choir established itself on the competition circuit, twice winning first prize in the Cork International Choral Festival Chamber Choir Competition. The choir also won the festival's Perpetual Trophy for single best performance of an individual work (2004), the Perpetual Trophy for the Performance of Irish Contemporary Choral Music (2003), and the Philib Uí Laoghaire Trophy for excellence in the performance of a part-song in Irish (2002). The choir also won the Feis Ceoil Culwick Cup for best chamber choir on six occasions since 1996, and released its first CD, Carols for Christmas, to great acclaim in December 2000.

=== University of Dublin Choral Society ===
Sherlock is a lecturer in Music in the DIT Conservatory and an honours music graduate of Trinity College, Dublin, where she lectured in the School of Music and was conductor of the University of Dublin Choral Society from 1999 to April 2008. She was just the tenth conductor of this 170-year-old choir. Sherlock and the UDCS released their first CD, the late Brian Boydell's Under No Circumstances, composed in honour of the choir's 150th anniversary in 1987. In April 2006 Sherlock was the first conductor to bring the UDCS to the National Concert Hall where it performed to a full house. The choir returned to the National Concert Hall with Carmina Burana in April 2007 and again sold out. On 31 March 2008 Sherlock conducted her final concert with the UDCS in the National Concert Hall, Dublin: a performance of Brahms' Ein Deutsches Requiem/A German Requiem, and Bernstein's Chichester Psalms.
