= Classical Movements =

American concert touring company

Classical Movements Inc.
- Type: Private corporation
- Industry: Travel, Music
- Founded: 1992
- Founder: Neeta Helms; Jacques Vallerand-Parisi
- Headquarters: Alexandria, Virginia, USA
- Area served: Worldwide
- Key people: Neeta Helms (President)
- Services: Travel management Organizing live music concerts
- Divisions: Blue Heart Travel Inc.
- Website: www.classicalmovements.com

Classical Movements is an American concert touring company in Alexandria, Virginia, specializing in concert and travel arrangements worldwide for professional symphonies and choruses as well as conservatory, university, and youth ensembles. Classical Movements produces two choral festivals: Ihlombe! South African Choral Festival and Serenade! Washington D.C. Choral Festival, in addition to the young artists music festival, Prague Summer Nights. It also commissions new works from Pulitzer, MacArthur and Grammy-winning composers through its Eric Daniel Helms New Music Program.

== History ==
Previously known as Blue Heart Travel, Inc, the company was established in October 1992 by Neeta Helms and Jacques Vallerand-Parisi with a base in Dupont Circle, Washington, D.C. The company began with tours to Russia and Ukraine one year after the Soviet Union fell and soon added destinations such as Croatia, Eastern Europe, Turkey, South Africa, and Cuba.

Since 1997, Classical Movements has been based in Alexandria, Virginia.

In 2014, Americans for the Arts, an arts advocacy organization in the United States, awarded Classical Movements the BCA10: Best Businesses Partnering with the Arts in America.

=== Leadership ===
- President (1992 - 2008): Jacques Vallerand-Parisi
- President (2008–present): Neeta Helms

== Cultural diplomacy ==
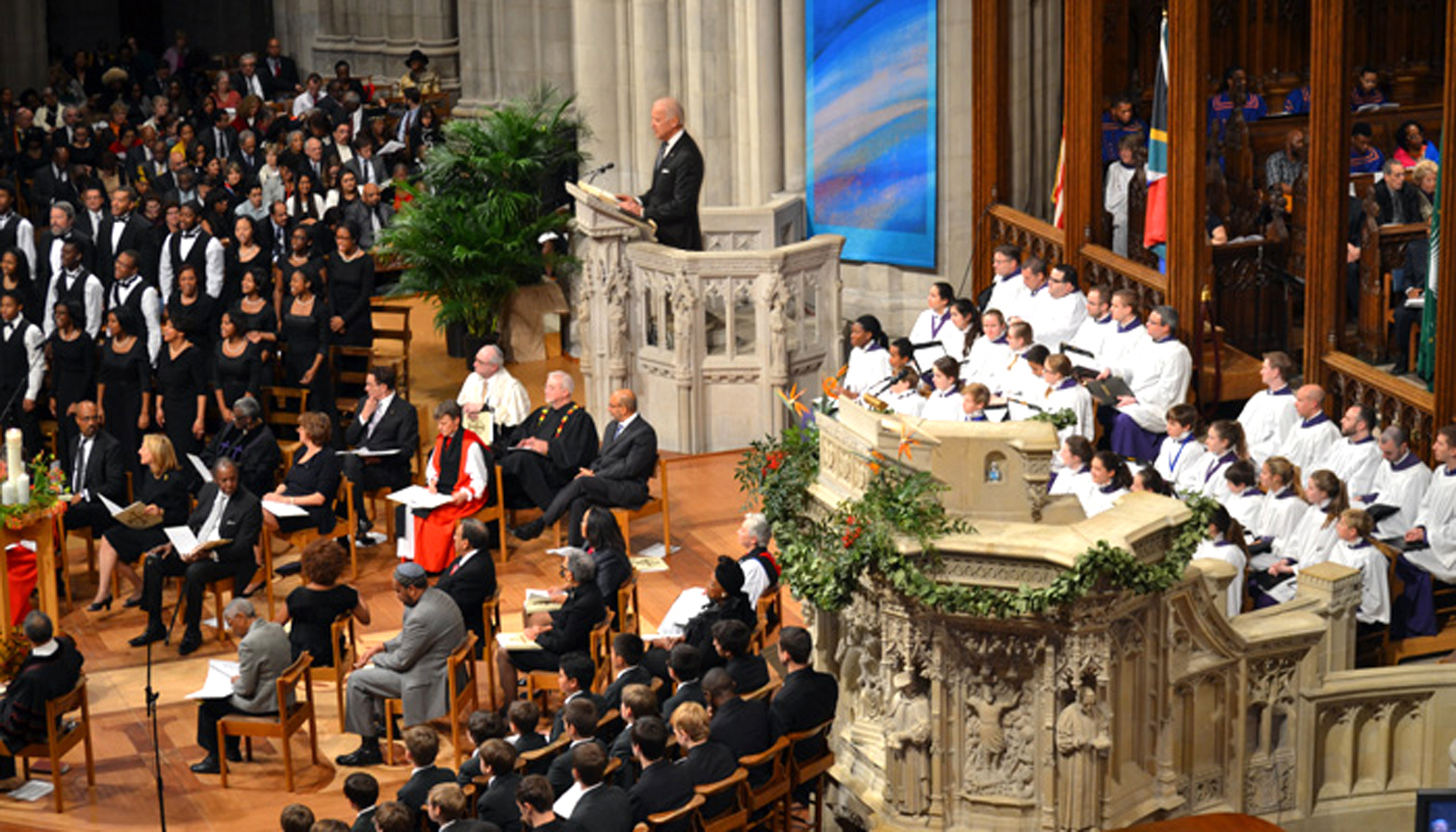
The official United States Nelson Mandela memorial service where the Morgan State University Choir and Pacific Boychoir performed in Washington D.C. in December 2013.

Classical Movements has been involved in numerous cultural diplomacy events.

A year after its founding, in 1993, Classical Movements took the Choral Arts Society of Washington on tour to Moscow, Russia with the National Symphony Orchestra conducted by Mstislav Rostropovich. This concert marked the first time any event other than a military parade had taken place in the Red Square. Among the audience of 100,000 was President Boris Yeltsin as millions more watched and listened worldwide to the live broadcast.

Classical Movements began touring to South Africa in 1994 shortly after apartheid was abolished and Nelson Mandela was elected president.

In 1995, Classical Movements became the first American company to offer tours in Croatia after the end of the Croat–Bosniak War, as well as in China becoming one of the first travel companies in the country following the 1989 massacre in Tiananmen Square, and in Vietnam following the new United States Embassy in Hanoi.

Several years later in 2003, the United States Department of State and John F. Kennedy Center for the Performing Arts invited the Iraqi National Symphony Orchestra to perform in Washington, alongside Leonard Slatkin's National Symphony Orchestra. Classical Movements arranged for the Iraqi musicians' travel from Baghdad.

According to its president Neeta Helms, Classical Movements worked for Google in 2009 to arrange all the travel and logistics for the debut of the YouTube Symphony Orchestra, where musicians from across the globe electronically met to perform at Carnegie Hall. In 2011, there was a reprise at the Sydney Opera House.

In 2010, Classical Movements arranged the travel for the first joint concert for American and Cuban choirs in Havana on the 4th of July. Later in 2015 the company arranged a Cuban tour with Minnesota Orchestra despite there being no official diplomatic ties yet between the United States and Cuba.

Classical Movements was also involved in the official United States memorial service for Nelson Mandela at Washington National Cathedral in 2013 where on behalf of the South African Ambassador to the United States, Ebrahim Rasool, they invited original Ihlombe! participants Morgan State University Choir and Pacific Boychoir.

== Orchestral and choir tours ==
Classical Movements organizes more than 200 concerts on 60 tours each season in 145 countries.

== International music festivals ==
Classical Movements currently owns and produces two annual international choral festivals and a young artists music festival.

- Ihlombe! South African Choral Festival (since 2009) is the largest choral gathering in South Africa and is hosted in Cape Town, Pretoria, Johannesburg, and Soweto. Concerts include 10-20 South African choirs, workshops, African drumming, and dancing.
- Serenade! Washington, DC Choral Festival (since 2011) features cultural and musical exchanges with national and international choirs with outreach events, workshops, and performances. Venues have included John F. Kennedy Center for the Performing Arts, Strathmore Music Center, George Washington Masonic National Memorial, and New York Avenue Presbyterian Church.
- Prague Summer Nights: Young Artists Music Festival (since 2015) is a 30-day program for singers and instrumentalists to receive professional performance training and experiences. The vocalists are mentored by a professional faculty of musicians who hold positions at major universities and conservatories or have major performing careers. It includes fully staged opera, directed by the operatic baritone Sherrill Milnes, as well as orchestral concerts, chamber music, solo recitals, and cabaret performed in historic halls in Tábor, Prague, and Salzburg.

== Eric Daniel Helms New Music Program ==
Since founding the Eric Daniel Helms New Music Program in 2005, Classical Movements has commissioned composers from 20 different countries to create more than 50 new works. Named after Neeta Helms's late father, the Eric Daniel Helms New Music Program encourages international collaboration. Alumni include American John Corigliano, Chinese-American Bright Sheng, and Cuban Tania León among many others of numerous nationalities. Altogether the composers in the program have won 5 Grammys, 4 Pulitzers, 1 Oscar, and 1 MacArthur.

In 2017, the Syrian composer Kinan Azmeh became Classical Movements' first Composer-in-Residence.

Year	Composer	Work	Premiere
2017	(Argentina) Oscar Escalada	Misa para el Tercer Mundo (Mass for the Third World)	Melodia! South American Choral Festival
2017	(Haiti) (United States) Sydney Guillaume	Ansanm-Ansanm	Serenade! Washington, D.C. Choral Festival
2017	(Latvia) Ēriks Ešenvalds	High Flight	Serenade! Washington, D.C. Choral Festival
2017	(Spain) Bernat Vivancos	L’ametller (The Almond Tree)	Serenade! Washington, D.C. Choral Festival
2017	(India) Madhup Mudgal	Vasudhaiva Kutumbkam (The World is One Family)	Serenade! Washington, D.C. Choral Festival
2017	(United States) Con Fullam	Under One Sky	Serenade! Washington, D.C. Choral Festival
2017	(Bulgaria) Milena Jeliazkova & Milena Roudeva	Orissiya (Destiny)	Serenade! Washington, D.C. Choral Festival
2017	(Mongolia) Egschiglen	Freedom of the Steppe	Serenade! Washington, D.C. Choral Festival
2017	(Zimbabwe) Insingizi	Bom Bom Jeys (It is important to know who we are...)	Serenade! Washington, D.C. Choral Festival
2017	(Germany) Christoph Göbel		Serenade! Washington, D.C. Choral Festival
2017	(Morocco) Siraj		Serenade! Washington, D.C. Choral Festival
2017	(United States) Billy Childs	In Gratitude	Chorus America
2017	(South Africa) Mokale Koapeng	Wings of Peace and Love: Reflections on Bheki Mseleku	University of Pretoria
2016	(United States) Kristin Kuster	Moxie	Baltimore Symphony Orchestra’s 100th anniversary season
2016	(United States) Christopher Rouse	Processional	Baltimore Symphony Orchestra’s 100th anniversary season
2016	(United States) Joan Tower	Fanfare for the Uncommon Woman #6	Baltimore Symphony Orchestra’s 100th anniversary season
2016	(United States) Libby Larsen	Earth (Holst Trope)	Baltimore Symphony Orchestra’s 100th anniversary season
2016	(United States) James Lee III	Thurgood's Rhapsody	Baltimore Symphony Orchestra’s 100th anniversary season
2016	(United States) Caroline Shaw	Baltimore Bomb	Baltimore Symphony Orchestra’s 100th anniversary season
2016	(United States) Lori Laitman	Unsung	Baltimore Symphony Orchestra’s 100th anniversary season
2016	(United States) TJ Cole	Double Play	Baltimore Symphony Orchestra’s 100th anniversary season
2016	(United States) Jonathan Leshnoff	Dancin' Blue Crabs	Baltimore Symphony Orchestra’s 100th anniversary season
2016	(United States) Christopher Theofanidis	The Game	Baltimore Symphony Orchestra’s 100th anniversary season
2016	(United States) Andrea Ramsey	The Gift to Sing	George Washington University
2015	(United States) Jim Papoulis	Sounds of a New Generation	New World Center
2015	(United States) André Thomas	Gloria (Glory to God)	ACDA National Conference
2015	(Spain) Emilio Solé Sempere	Hearts Beat Together	ACDA National Conference
2015	(Canada) Sarah Quartel	Wide Open Spaces	ACDA National Conference
2015	(United Kingdom) Will Todd	Gloria	ACDA National Conference
2015	(United States) Jay Broeker	Peace Like A River	ACDA National Conference
2014	(Estonia) Piret Rips-Laul	Salve Regina	Williamsburg, Virginia
2013	(United Kingdom) Andrew Gant	Psalm World	Groton School Chapel
2012	(China) (United States) Bright Sheng	A Porter's Song	Woolsey Hall (Yale Glee Club)
2012	(Canada) Aaron Jensen	We Are as One	Serenade! Washington, D.C. Choral Festival
2012	(United States) Stephen Paulus	When Music Sounds	Chorus America
2012	(United States) Derek Bermel	YPChant	Carnegie Hall
2012	(United States) John Corigliano	Upon Julia's Clothes	Carnegie Hall
2012	(United States) Douglas J. Cuomo	How to Survive in the Woods	Carnegie Hall
2012	(United States) David Del Tredici	Credo Fugue	Carnegie Hall
2012	(Cuba) (United States) Paquito D'Rivera	UN Minuto	Carnegie Hall
2012	(United States) Michael Gordon	Cinnamon	Carnegie Hall
2012	(China) (United States) Bright Sheng	Thirty-Mile Village	Carnegie Hall
2012	(United States) Joan Tower	Descent	Carnegie Hall
2012	(United States) Ken Berg	The Cremation of Sam McGee	Parker Playhouse
2011	(Finland) Olli Kortekangas	Three Studies	Children's Chorus of Washington's 15th Anniversary
2011	(Cuba) (United States) Tania León	Rimas Tropicales	Chorus America
2011	(United States) David Rimelis	OrchKids Nation	Joseph Meyerhoff Symphony Hall
2010	(South Africa) Mokale Koapeng	Letlang Bana	Ihlombe! South African Choral Festival
2009	(South Africa) Stephen Carletti	Evening Canticles	St. George's Cathedral
2009	(Mexico) Jorge Córdoba Valencia	Tu	Sala Nezahualcoyotl (Mexico City)
2008	(United States) Daniel Brewbaker	El Angel	Melodia! South American Music Festival
2006	(Argentina) Oscar Escalada	Tu	Melodia! South American Music Festival
