= Isabelle Cantat =

French physicist

Isabelle Cantat (née Durand, born 1974) is a French physicist specializing in foams and their fluid dynamics. She is a professor in the Institute of Physics of Rennes at the University of Rennes.

== Education and career ==
Cantat was born on 5 January 1974 in Rennes. She earned an agrégation in physics in 1996 through study at the École normale supérieure de Lyon. She completed a doctorate in 1999 and a habilitation in 2006.

After postdoctoral research at Heinrich Heine University Düsseldorf in Germany, she became maître de conférences in the Groupe Matière Condensée et Matériaux (GMCM) at the University of Rennes 1, which later became part of the Institute of Physics of Rennes (IPR). In 2007 she was promoted to professor.

== Book ==
Cantat is a coauthor of the book Foams: Structure and Dynamics (Oxford University Press, 2013, with Sylvie Cohen-Addad, Florence Elias, François Graner, Reinhard Höhler, Olivier Pitois, Florence Rouyer, Arnaud Saint-Jalmes, and Simon Cox).

== Recognition ==
Cantat was named a junior professor of the Institut Universitaire de France in 2009. She received the CNRS Silver Medal in 2023.
