= Johan Duijck =

Belgian composer & conductor (born 1954)

Johan Duijck (born 1954 in Ghent) is a Belgian composer and conductor.

He is conductor of the Flemish Radio Choir, the Academy of St Martin in the Fields Chorus in London and the Gents Madrigaalkoor. He is regularly invited as a guest conductor of renowned ensembles such as the Orquesta Sinfónica Real de Sevilla, the Dartington Festival Orchestra, the Danish Radio Choir and others.

As a composer he is dedicated to piano and choral music. His works Alma de la música and The Well-Tempered Pianist have received international acclaim.

He has been a teacher of piano and choral conducting at the Ghent Conservatory and at the Queen Elisabeth Music Chapel. Among his students is Annelies Van Parys. He is the director of the academy for choral conducting at the Euskalerriko Abesbatzen Elkartea (Spain).

== Recordings ==
- Johan Duijck: El Camino de Alma - de Weg van de Ziel, with Hilde Coppé, Ignace Michiels (organ), Collegium Instrumentale Brugense, Noëlle Schepens, Vlaams Radio Koor (VRK), Hans Ryckelynck, Gents Madrigaalkoor, conductor Johan Duijck (2008)
- Johan Duijck: Cantiones Sacrae, with Vlaams Radio Koor, Ignace Michiels (organ), conductor Johan Duijck (2009)
