= International Festival of University Choirs =

International Festival of the University Choirs "Universitas Cantat"
- Genre: Choral festivals
- Dates: June
- Locations: Poznań, Poland
- Years active: 1998–present
- Website: official site

The International Festival of University Choirs is an international choral festival held in various venues within Poland's Wielkopolska region. Established in 1998, it is organised by Adam Mickiewicz University (AMU), the AMU Chamber Choir, and the Association of Friends of the AMU Chamber Choir, and is intended to showcase choral music from different traditions. Its artistic director is Krzysztof Szydzisz.
