= Picfest =

The Pacific International Children's Choir Festival (PICCFEST) was established in 1998 as a week-long residential event and quickly became regarded as one of the top youth choir festivals in North America, presenting 28 gatherings by its final season in 2023. The gatherings took place each summer, except 2020 and 2021 (COVID19) in Eugene, Oregon, United States, in conjunction with the long-established Oregon Bach Festival. The festival's co-founder and Artistic Director: Peter Robb, a composer and arranger of choral music as well as a conductor. The other co-founders: Genevieve Robb and Rebecca Robb Hicks.

In 2015 the name was changed to Pacific International Choral Festivals (picfest) in order to better identify the expansion from one festival to two festivals each season. With the slogan Longer season, shorter name, picfest announced a line-up of four distinct events. On even numbered years, the June event became Youth Choral Festival (open to all voicings of young choirs up through age 18) and the new July event became the Young Women's Choral Festival (for female singers through age 18). On odd numbered years, picfest featured its flagship Treble Choral Festival in June and the newly renamed Sing Brothers Sing! Choral Festival in July (for male singers up through age 18).

picfest was built on a non-competitive model. Each year ten -sixteen choirs are admitted through an audition process that takes into account the choir's history, repertoire, and recordings. Since inception, more than 180 choirs from 38 states and provinces in the United States, Canada, Australia, Finland, Taiwan and the Philippines have been selected and participated.

Choirs and their chaperones were housed on the beautiful University of Oregon campus.

The collaboration between picfest and the Oregon Bach Festival resulted in a performance by the picfest Chorus at the opening ceremonies of the Oregon Bach Festival. In 2008, with the U.S. Olympic Track & Field Trials running concurrently with the festivals, the opening ceremonies performance took place on the performance venue at track's legendary Hayward Field. In 2011 and 2017, the Oregon Bach Festival had no official opening ceremony, and the entire picfest Chorus performed a free On-The-House concert.

picfest also presented one of the Oregon Bach Festival's On-The-House concerts in the Hult Center lobby during each festival. This concert featured one or two of the visiting choirs or the entire festival chorus, as in 2011 and 2017. Attending choirs also performed individually at various local churches on the Sunday of the June Festival. Each festival concluded with a ticketed concert - the Gala Concert in June and the Finale Concert in July - performed by the Festival Chorus and guest musicians.

== Conductors and themes ==
Each year picfest features a guest conductor of international stature. Recent guest conductors have included Bob Chilcott (2005, 2008, 2012, 2014, 2016, 2018, 2022), Sandra Snow (2003, 2007, 2009, 2011, 2015), Henry Leck (2001, 2006, 2013, 2017), Susan Brumfield (2019, 2023), Andrea Ramsey (2014, 2016), Gary Packwood (2023), Lynne Gackle (2010), and.

The repertoire of the festival chorus reflects a theme selected for each year:

- 1998 - Our Voices Raised in Song
- 1999 - Color the World with a Song
- 2000 - Listen to the Future
- 2001 - Roads to the Heart
- 2002 - The World is Full of Poetry
- 2003 - Dreams of Peace
- 2004 - Imagine
- 2005 - Walk • Dance • Talk • Sing
- 2006 - Untraveled Worlds
- 2007 - Celebrate! The Tenth Anniversary
- 2008 - I Dream A World
- 2009 - Rediscovering the Americas: The Music of Two Continents
- 2010 - Gala Concert
- 2011 - Wild About Singing
- 2012 - A Magical Musical Land Called PICCFEST
- 2013 - Heartsongs
- 2014 - Turn The World Around (Youth Choral Festival) and Voices Strong & Beautiful (Young Women's Choral Festival)
- 2015 - East Meets West (Treble Choral Festival) and North Meets South (Boys & Young Men's Choral Festival)
- 2016 - Shakespeare & All That Jazz (Youth Choral Festival) and The Poet Sings (Young Women's Choral Festival)
- 2017 - Alway Something Sings (Treble Choral Festival) and True Colors (Boys & Young Men's Choral Festival)
- 2018 - In the Heart of the World (Youth Choral Festival)
- 2019 - Turn the Music Up! (Treble Choral Festival)
- 2020 - 2021: No festivals during COVID shutdown
- 2022 - Lightwaves (Youth Choral Festival)
- 2023 - Turn the Music Up! One More Time - The Final Season
