= Willem Kersters =

Belgian composer

Willem Kersters (9 February 1929 in Antwerp – 29 December 1998 in Antwerp) was a Belgian composer, music educator and musician. He is in particular known for his wind music.
