= American Music Performance Invitational for Mixed Choirs =

Music festival series for school choirs

The American Music Performance Invitational for Mixed Choirs refers to a series of music festivals for top school choirs. The festivals are more commonly referred to as the AMP Invitationals. Produced by Choirs of America (COA), the inaugural AMP Invitational took place in Long Beach and Los Angeles on April 29–30, 2011. COA's stated mission is "to engage, inspire and educate choirs across the country." COA was recently named a "Citizen Musician" as part of the Citizen Musician Initiative fronted by the Chicago Symphony Orchestra, music director Riccardo Muti and Yo-Yo Ma. Wenger Corp is COA's title sponsor.

== Inaugural AMP Invitational ==
COA's first AMP Invitational took place on April 29–30, 2011. Clinicians and adjudicators included Jo-Michael Scheibe, Cheryl Frazes-Hill (assistant conductor of the Chicago Symphony Chorus, Jonathan Talberg, William Belan and Bruce Mayhall. Workshop presenters included Broadway producer Ken Davenport, motivational speaker Norm Hull, David Sears (senior director of education at the GRAMMY Foundation) and Terry Knowles (president and CEO of the Los Angeles Master Chorale).

The event culminated in a massed choir benefit concert with master conductor Eric Whitacre leading over 630 high school singers from three different states in a program that raised over $3,600.00 for L.A.'s Harmony Project. Participants included top mixed high school choirs from Branham, Calabasas, Chino Hills, Highland, Monte Vista, Porterville, Sprague, Thomas Downey, Tualatin, Westwood and Valencia. Highland High School from Gilbert, Arizona earned the coveted top rated choir slot (Monte Vista came in second, with Sprague placing third).

== Future AMP Invitationals ==
=== 2013 AMP Nationals for Top Choirs - New York City & Carnegie Hall (April 11, 12 & 13, 2013) ===
Day one is a bonus day for subsidiary ensembles to have adjudicated performances and faculty reviews. Day 2 will feature adjudicated performances for primary ensembles, full one-hour clinics with Master Clinicians and Adjudicators Andre Thomas, Jerry Blackstone, Jeffrey Douma, and Gene Peterson. Vocal master classes with Matthew Oltman (music director emeritus of Chanticleer) and other workshops are also scheduled for all choirs.

Day two will occur at Carnegie Hall and will feature a massed choir rehearsal and prism concert led by Master Conductor, Anton Armstrong.

=== San Francisco, California (March 23–24, 2012) ===
Featured clinicians and adjudicators include Jo-Michael Scheibe, Sharon Paul, Joshua Habermann (director of the Dallas Symphony Chorus), Timothy Seelig, and Susan McMane. Matthew Oltman will run the vocal master classes and Roger Treece will lead workshops in circle song improvisation. Day two will take place in Louise M. Davies Symphony Hall with master conductor Grant Gershon.

=== Washington DC area (March 30–31, 2012) ===
Day one will take place at the University of Maryland in College Park, Maryland and will feature Jerry Blackstone, Karen Kennedy and Jameson Marvin as clinicians. Day two will occur at the Clarice Smith Performing Arts Center and will feature a massed choir benefit concert led by master conductor, Simon Carrington.
