= Choralies =

Choral festival in Vaison-la-Romaine, France

- Reception stand for the Choralies festival in Vaison-la-Romaine in 1974
- Genre: choral
- Venue: Théâtre antique
- Location: Vaison-la-Romaine
- Coordinates: 44°14′32″N 5°04′21″E
- Inaugurated: 1953
- Capacity: 5000
- Organiser: À Cœur Joie
- Website: www.choralies.fr

Choralies is a choral festival bringing together between 3000 and 14000 choral singers and musicians, amateur as well as professional. It is organised every three years by the association À Cœur Joie, founded by César Geoffray and the Scouts de France in 1947. The first edition was held in 1953, the twenty-fifth in August 2025.

Each festival, which is run by a team of mostly volunteers, lasts for 9 days and is held in Vaison-la-Romaine, in the department Vaucluse in the region Provence-Alpes-Côte d'Azur.

From 1978 to 2011 there was also a version of Choralies for children and teenagers: Cantilies. This was also held every three years, although in different cities. Since 2016, Choralies has been open to children.

== Festival ==
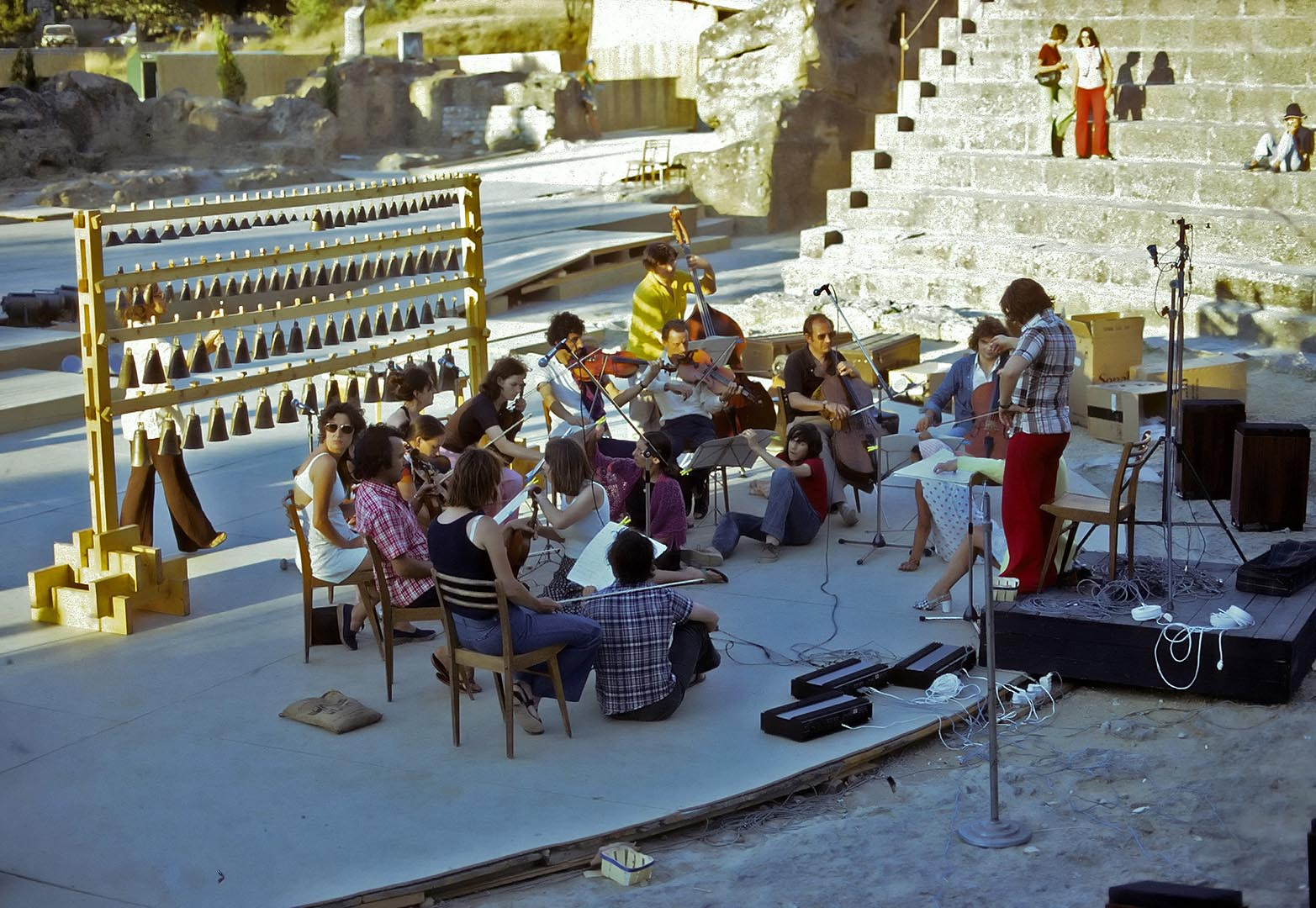
Musical atelier

=== Ateliers ===
The participants sign up for an atelier and rehearse specific repertoire every morning, which is later performed in an evening concert. Usually around 40 workshops are offered, ranging from jazz and Mozart to Cuban music and Renaissance polyphony

The ateliers, which differ for every edition, are directed by professional choral conductors, often internationally renowned ones.

=== Concerts by participating choirs ===
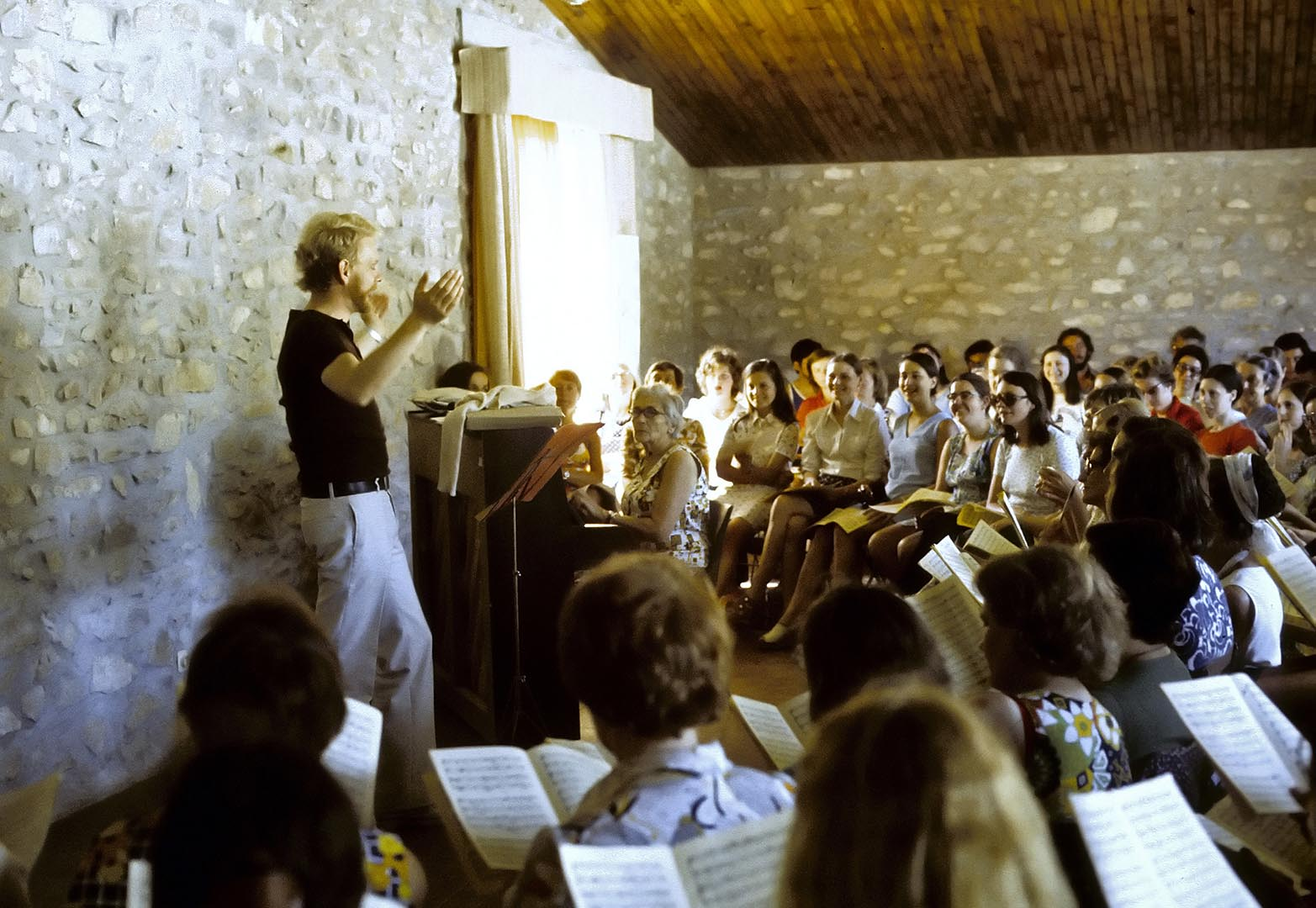
Rehearsal by a choir

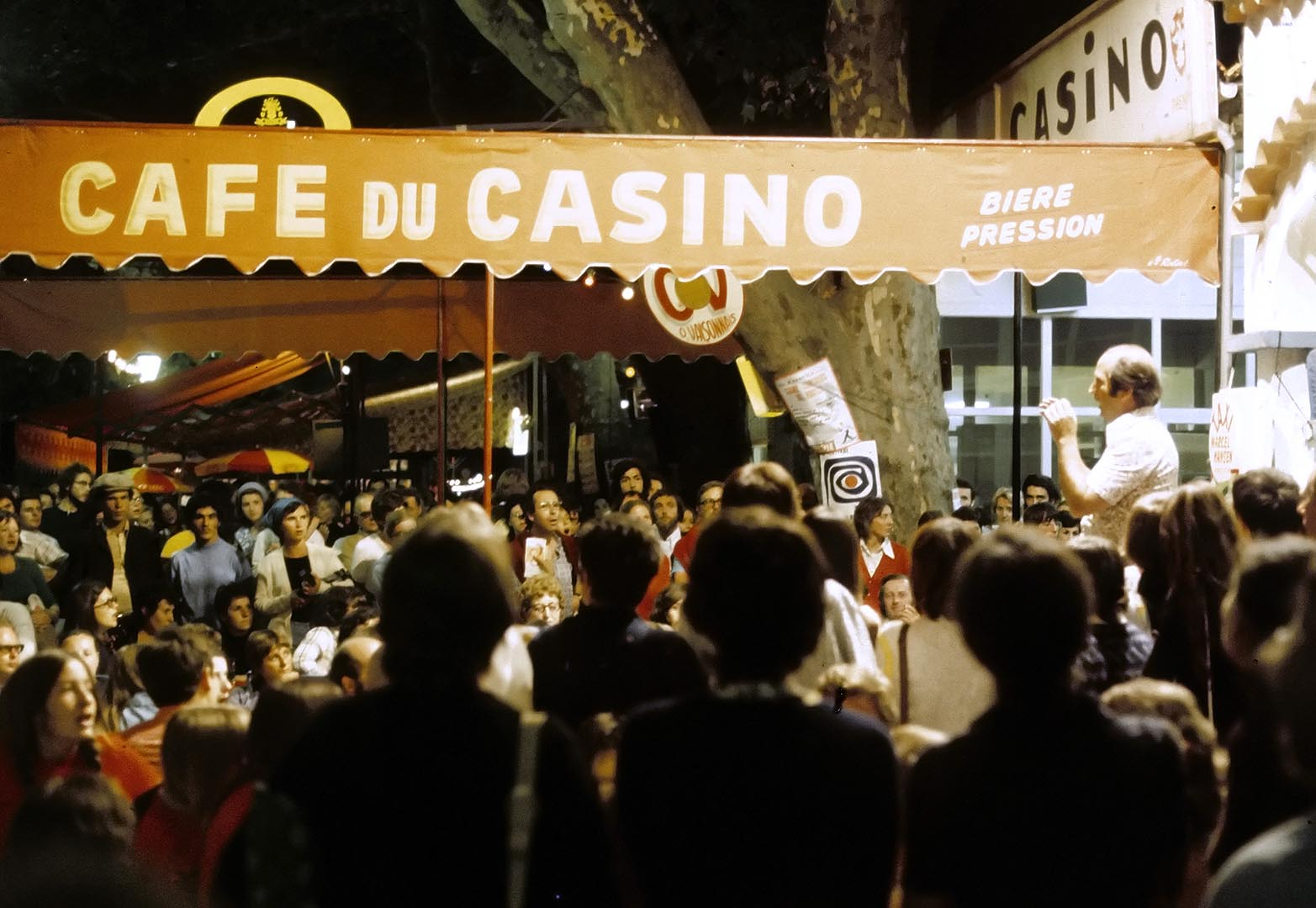
Choir performance at the Place Montfort

The choirs, whether amateur or professionals, have the possibility of coming as an establishing choir and giving one or more concerts in Vaison-la-Romaine or in the near vicinity.

=== Concerts by invited choirs ===
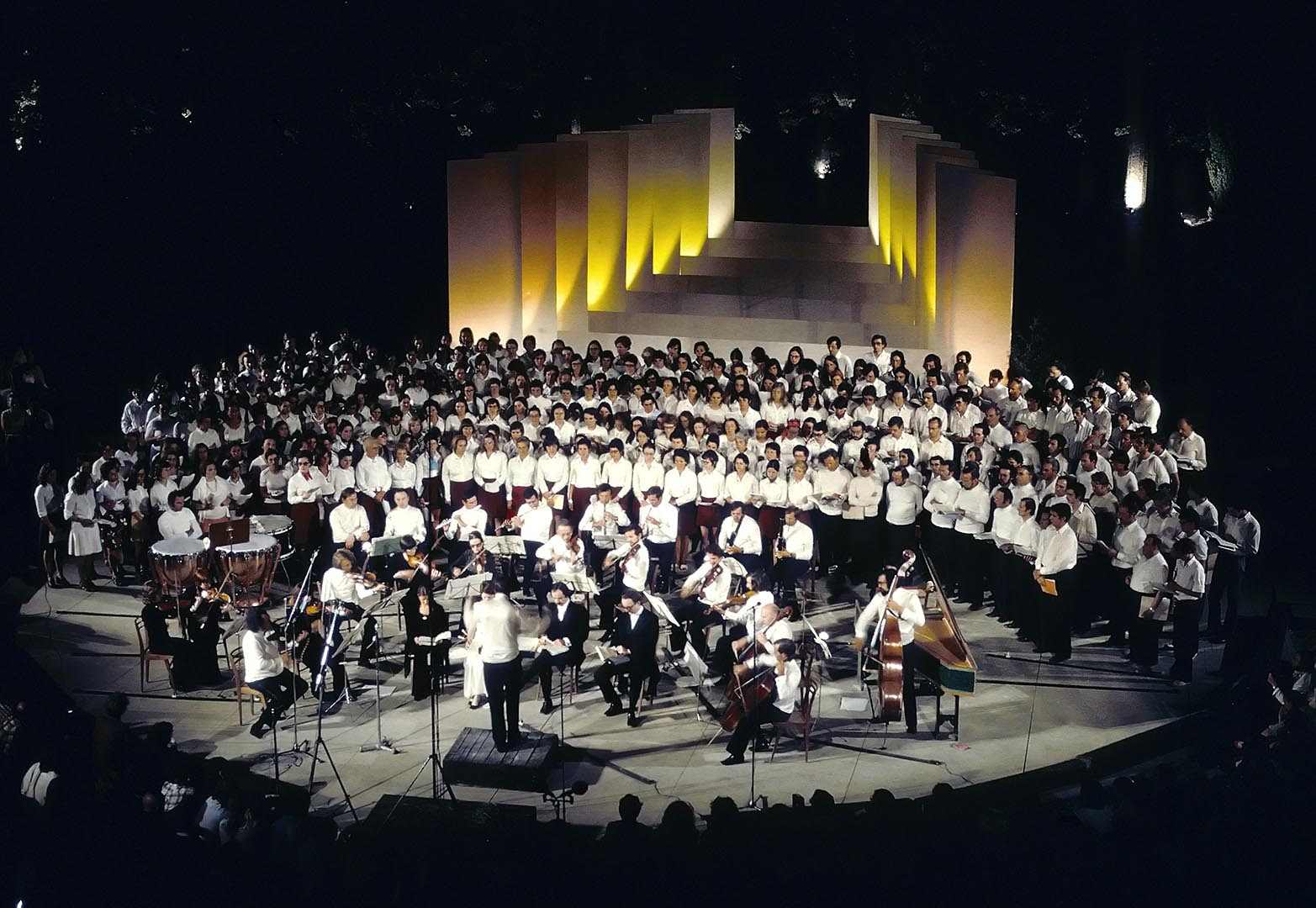

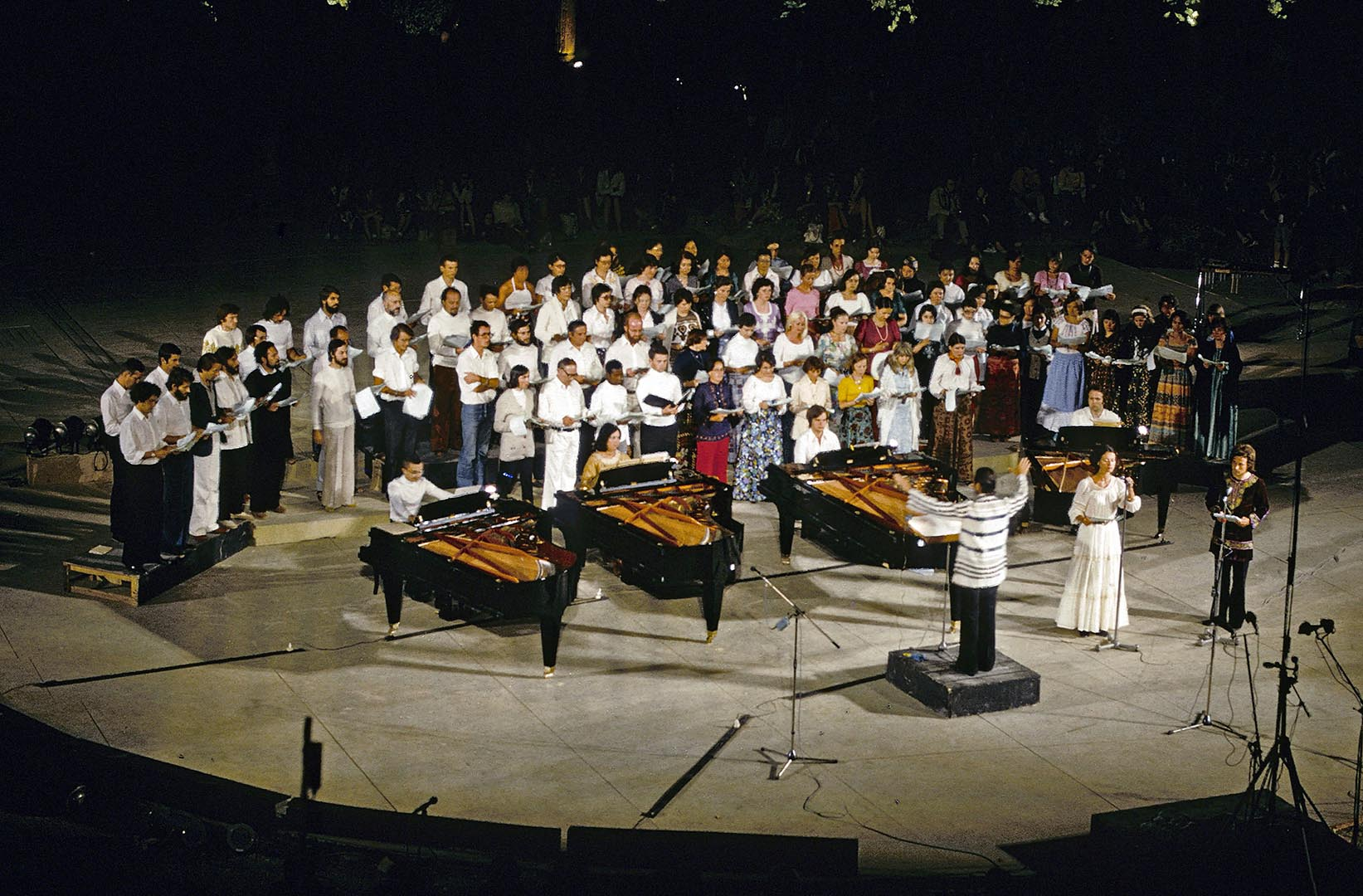

Professional choirs and orchestras are invited to give evening concerts at the Théâtre antique in Vaison-la-Romaine.

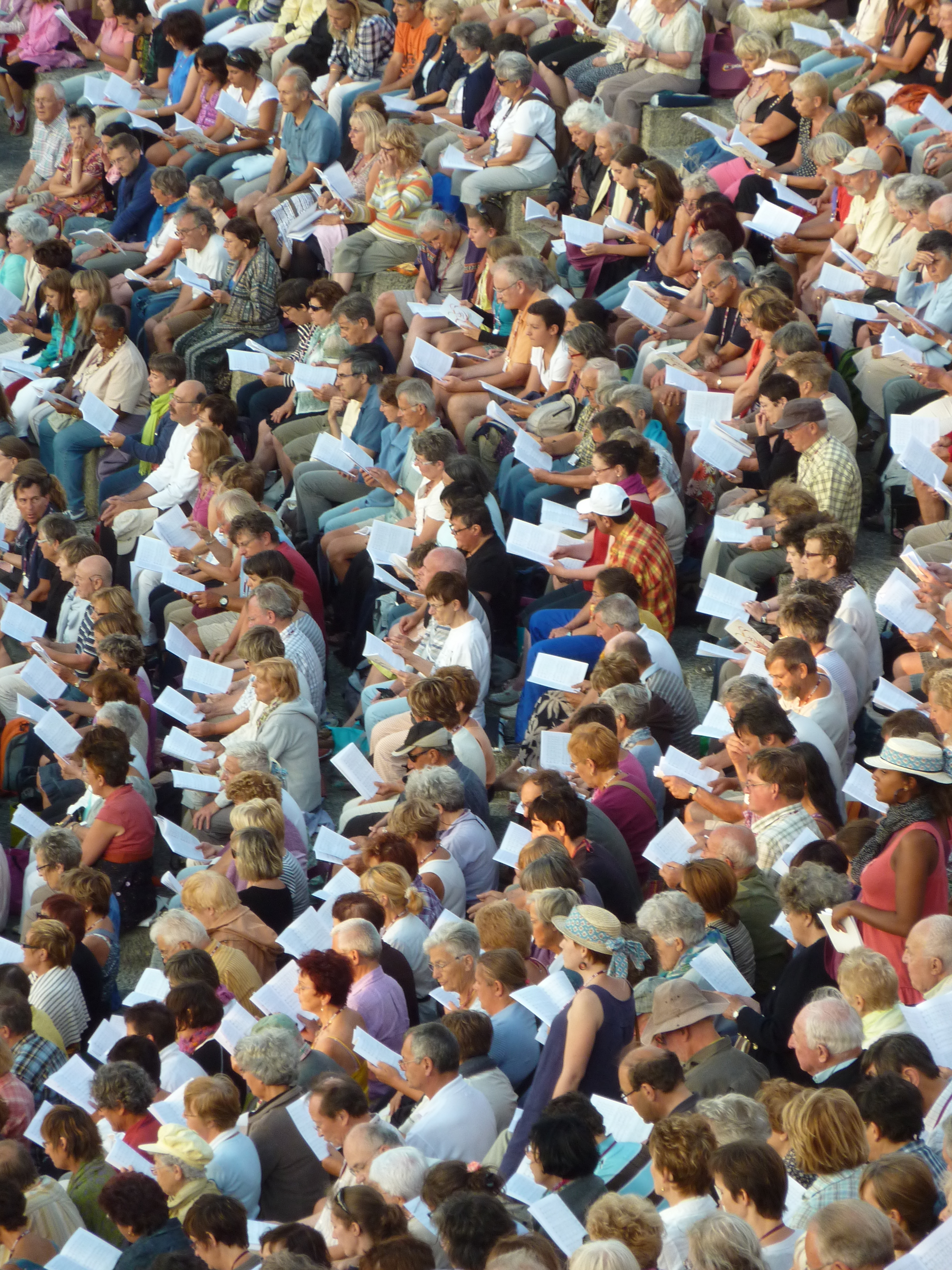
Chant commun in the Théâtre antique in 2010

=== Chant commun ===
Every evening in the Théâtre antique, before the evening concert, communal singing session in which up to 5000 participants sing pieces from the shared repertoire provided by À Cœur Joie.

== See also ==
- Europa Cantat Festival, a similar festival inspired by Choralies
