= Nordic Student Singers' Summit =

Choral festival

Nordic Students Singers' Summit – NSSS (Swedish: Nordisk Studentsångarstämma) is a choral festival arranged by Linköping University, every third year in a Nordic or Baltic country.

== History ==
Since 1987, Nordic and Baltic University choirs have gathered every third year in a choral festival. The first summit took place in 1987 in Linköping, Sweden. It was a renewal of an old tradition from the 19th century when the Scandinavian choirs travelled through Scandinavia by train or boat to visit each other.

The first summit focused on pedagogical and social events. From 1996, when 1,400 singers performed Carmina Burana by Carl Orff in Copenhagen and in 1999 in Tallinn Beethoven's Symphony No. 9, the summits have become more of public events. In Lappeenranta in Finland two pieces were premièred; Symphony No. 111 by Leif Segerstam and Das Lied des Wassers by Marcus Fagerudd. Both under the direction of Leif Segerstam.

== Purpose ==
The purpose of NSSS is to gather choirs across Nordic and Baltic countries in a festival for singing, performing and networking. The festival may also feature workshops and a gala dinner for its singers.

== NSSS 1987–2028 ==
- 2028 NSSS XII, Turku, Finland
- 2025 NSSS XI, Linköping, Sweden
- 2020 NSSS, Trondheim, Norway (cancelled due to world-wide coronavirus outbreak)
- 2017 NSSS X, Oulu, Finland
- 2014 NSSS IX, Tartu, Estonia
- 2011 NSSS VIII, Linköping, Sweden
- 2008 NSSS VII, Stavanger, Norway
- 2005 NSSS VI, Lappeenranta, Finland
- 2002 NSSS (cancelled)
- 1999 NSSS V, Tallinn, Estonia
- 1996 NSSS IV, Copenhagen, Denmark
- 1993 NSSS III, Trondheim, Norway
- 1990 NSSS II, Turku, Finland
- 1987 NSSS I, Linköping, Sweden
