= Europa Cantat (festival) =

European choir festival

- Logo of the 2027 edition

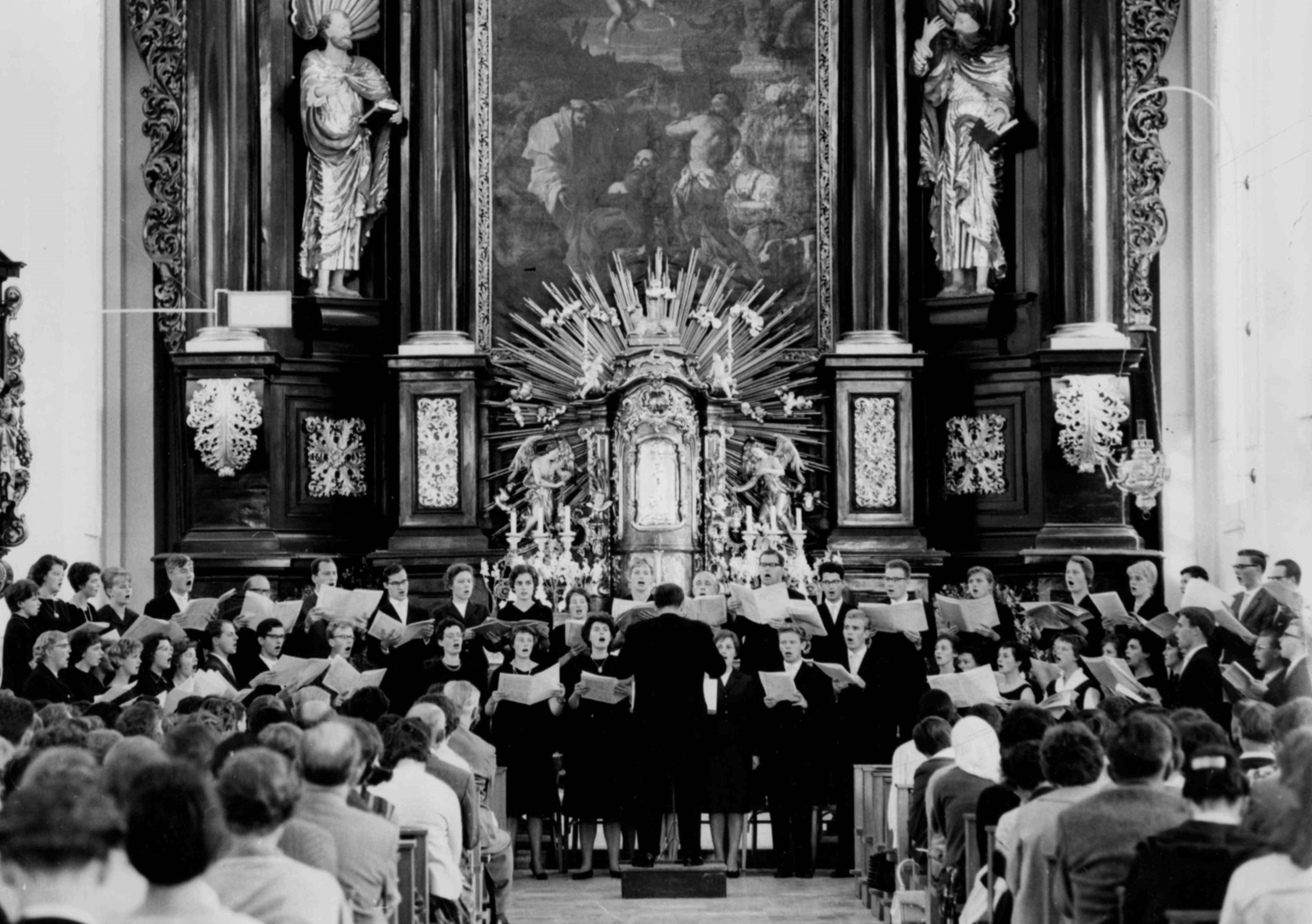
- First edition of Europa Cantat in Passau, Germany
- Status: Active
- Genre: Choral music
- Frequency: triennially
- Years active: 1961-present
- Attendance: 3000
- Organiser: Europa Cantat - European Federation of Young Choirs (1963-2011); European Choral Association - Europa Cantat (from 2011)
- Website: europeanchoralassociation.org/activities/ec-festival/

Europa Cantat is an international choral festival, organised every three years since 1961 by the European Choral Association, taking place in a different host city every time. The festival aims to connect people from different culture through singing together.

During the festival, there are ateliers held for choirs and individual singers, and there are concerts by various choirs and ensembles. There are also regular Open Singing sessions, where all festival participants can join to sing pieces from a music bundle published specially for every edition.

While the festival was originally intended to foster inter-European community, the festival also regularly attracts choirs from other parts of the world, including the United States, Israel and Hong Kong.

== History ==
In 1951, French choral federation À Cœur Joie in Lyon hosted the Karlsruhe youth choir, the first time a German choir visited France since the Second World War. Following that exchange, the German conductor of the youth choir Paul Wehrle and French business man Pierre Hoste decided to expand this idea. The French-German initiative by À Cœur Joie and the German choral federation Arbeitskreis Musik in der Jugend aimed to promote European unity after the Second World War. The first meeting in Geneva in 1960 led to the de facto founding of a European Federation, which organised the first Europa Cantat Festival 1961 in Passau, Germany. Following that, the Europäische Föderation junger Chöre was established de jure in 1963.

The festival was modelled after the French festival Choralies, a choral festival that À Cœur Joie had been organising every three years in Vaison-la-Romaine since 1953.

== Editions ==
| # | Year | Host city | Country |
|---|---|---|---|
| 1 | 1961 | Passau | Germany |
| 2 | 1964 | Nevers | France |
| 3 | 1967 | Namur | Belgium |
| 4 | 1970 | Graz | Austria |
| 5 | 1973 | Autun | France |
| 6 | 1976 | Leicestershire | United Kingdom |
| 7 | 1979 | Lucerne | Switzerland |
| 8 | 1982 | Namur | Belgium |
| 9 | 1985 | Strasbourg | France |
| 10 | 1988 | Pécs | Hungary |
| 11 | 1991 | Vitoria-Gasteiz | Spain |
| 12 | 1994 | Herning | Denmark |
| 13 | 1997 | Linz | Austria |
| 14 | 2000 | Nevers | France |
| 15 | 2003 | Barcelona | Spain |
| 16 | 2006 | Mainz | Germany |
| 17 | 2009 | Utrecht | Netherlands |
| 18 | 2012 | Turin | Italy |
| 19 | 2015 | Pécs | Hungary |
| 20 | 2018 | Tallinn | Estonia |
| 21 | 2021 | Ljubljana | Slovenia |
| | 2024 | Was planned, but no location or funding due to COVID-19 | |
| 22 | 2027 | Liepāja | Latvia |

== Europa Cantat Junior ==
Europa Cantat Junior is a festival similar to the regular Europa Cantat with a focus on children’s choirs and youth choirs, with singers under 18, offering workshops, concerts, Open Singing and non-choral activities with a schedule adapted to this age group.

| # | Year | Host city | Country |
|---|---|---|---|
| 1 | 1996 | Kaposvár | Hungary |
| 2 | 1999 | Wolfenbüttel | Germany |
| 3 | 2002 | Namur | Belgium |
| 4 | 2005 | Vic | Spain |
| 5 | 2008 | Nevers | France |
| 6 | 2011 | Pärnu | Estonia |
| 7 | 2014 | Bergen | Norway |
| 8 | 2017 | Lyon | France |
| 9 | 2022 | Vilnius | Lithuania |
| 10 | 2023 | Ghent | Belgium |
| 11 | 2026 | Girona | Spain |

== See also ==
- Choralies, the festival that inspired Europa Cantat
