= Cork International Choral Festival =

Music festival in Cork, Ireland

The Cork International Choral Festival is held annually in Cork, Ireland and features choirs from all over the world. About 5,000 choristers take part every year; they come from all over Ireland, from Britain, from the European continent, and sometimes from as far away as Africa, America, and Asia. Since its foundation in 1954, there have been about 3,500 choir entries. The most recent festival took place in May 2025.

== History ==
The festival was founded in 1954. It was part of An Tóstal, a national festival begun by Seán Lemass in 1952, as an attempt to set lift the country from a period of economic depression and high emigration. This initiative was supported by senior Army officers and Bórd Fáilte, the Irish Tourist Board; which played a leading role in its implementation.

The first Tóstal began in Cork in 1953 with a pageant in which a large section of the business community took part; there were sporting events, Gaelic League activities, and an arts programme which included a performance of Handel's Messiah performed by the English Hallé Orchestra under Sir John Barbirolli, with Our Lady's Choral Society of Dublin – in all 300 performers.

The following year the Choral Festival was established in its own right, and two years later the Cork Film Festival.

The Choral Festival set out to

- encourage music-making at local level, to provide a forum for rural and small town choirs
- bring outstanding foreign choirs to Ireland and thus set standards against which the national choirs could measure themselves
- safeguard standards by having panels of Irish and foreign adjudicators
- provide entertainment for a large audience by combining competitive with non-competitive performances interspersed with Irish and foreign folk dancing
- establish contact between the two parts of Ireland: a choir from Belfast attended the first Festival and that bridge-building continued to be successful Festival policy despite the Troubles
- establish links with foreign choirs and dance teams and encourage Irish choirs to visit their counterparts abroad
- create incentives for the production of new choral music by Irish composers and to encourage Irish choirs to perform this music: since the beginning competitors have been required to sing one work by a living composer from their own country. From 1958 to 1961 there were two competitions for Irish composers: one for a new work, and one for a folk song arrangement; in 1962 the Seminar on Contemporary Choral Music was set up which commissioned up to four Irish and foreign composers every year to produce new works for performance at the university Seminar and at the Festival. (To date 118 new works have been commissioned from 98 different composers). 1972 brought a further initiative with the Seán Ó Riada Trophy competition for young Irish composers commissioned by Irish choirs.
- encourage choral music in schools – a schools competition was introduced in 1966
- bring the Festival to the city through outreach or fringe activities which have been organised since 1959. Visiting choirs sing for church services and give church recitals; choirs and dance teams perform in various venues outside the City Hall; foreign choirs give joint recitals with Irish partner choirs in their home towns in County Cork.

Each year amateur international choirs are selected to compete for the Fleischmann International Trophy. The selected choirs also perform non-competitively in a range of Festival activities over the weekend, including Fringe concerts, church and informal performances. As well as foreign choirs, the Festival annually features up to 100 Adult, Youth and School choirs who participate in National Competitions. In 2011, 16 foreign ensembles came to Cork to participate in the Festival.

== Literature ==
- Ruth Fleischmann (ed.): Cork International Choral Festival 1954-2004: A Celebration (Herford: Glen House Press, 2004), ISBN 1-85390-767-7.
