= Abrahamyan =

Abrahamyan (Armenian: Աբրահամյան) and its variants Abrahamian and Aprahamian in Western Armenian is an Armenian surname. Notable people with the surname include:

== Abrahamyan ==
- Alyosha Abrahamyan (1945–2018), Armenian footballer
- Arthur Abraham (born 1980), Armenian-German professional boxer known as Arthur Abraham
- Azat Abrahamyan (born 1961), Armenian singer-songwriter and actor
- Benik Abrahamyan (born 1985), Armenian-Georgian shot putter
- Gayane Abrahamyan (born 1979), Armenian politician and journalist
- Harutyun Abrahamyan (born 1969), Armenian footballer
- Henrik Abrahamyan (1939–1999), Armenian statesman and public figure
- Hovik Abrahamyan (born 1959), Armenian politician
- Karen Abrahamyan (born 1966), Armenian politician and general
- Khachik Abrahamyan (born 1960), armenian artist
- Khoren Abrahamyan (1930–2004), Armenian actor and film director
- Medea Abrahamyan (1932–2021), Armenian cellist
- Sargis Abrahamyan (1915–1969), Armenian writer, pedagogue and cultural figure
- Tatev Abrahamyan (born 1988), American chess player
- Vrtanes Abrahamyan (born 1962), prelate of the Armenian Apostolic Church

== Abrahamian ==
- Ara Abrahamian (born 1975), Armenian-Swedish sport wrestler
- Ashot G. Abrahamian (1903–1983), Soviet Armenian historian
- Atossa Araxia Abrahamian (born 1986), Swiss-American journalist
- Bob Abrahamian (1978–2014), American-Armenian soul music deejay, historian, archivist, and record collector.
- Ervand Abrahamian (born 1940), American historian
- Levon Abrahamian (born 1947), Armenian anthropologist and historian
- Mark Abrahamian (1966–2012), American musician
- Paul Abrahamian (1993), Big Brother Season 18 contestant
- Rouben Abrahamian, Armenian Iranologist, linguist and translator
- Stéphan Abrahamian (born 1946), French cyclist

== Aprahamian ==
- Alain Mikael Aprahamian (born 1988), Uruguayan judoka
- Ani Aprahamian (born 1958), Lebanese-born Armenian-American nuclear physicist
- Felix Aprahamian (1914–2005), British music critic, writer, concert promoter
- Pablo Aprahamian (born 1985), Uruguayan judoka of Armenian descent

== See also ==
- Abramyan (disambiguation)
