= Public Radio of Armenia =

- Yerevan; Armenia
- Frequency: 107.7 MHz in Yerevan

Programming
- Language: Armenian
- Format: Varied

Ownership
- Owner: Public Radio of Armenia

History
- First air date: September 1, 1926; 99 years ago
- Former names: Voice of Yerevan (1926)
- Former frequencies: 107.6 MHz Yerevan

Links
- Webcast: armradioplayer.online
- Website: armradio.am

Public Radio of Armenia (Armenian: Հայաստանի Հանրային Ռադիո, romanized: Hayastani Hanrayin Radio; Djsy Armradio) is a public radio broadcaster in Armenia. It was established in 1926 and remains one of the largest broadcasters in the country, with at least three national networks. The agency also has the country's largest sound archives and four orchestras, and it participates in cultural preservation programs.

== Early years ==
On September 1, 1926, the first experimental radio programme (25 minutes duration) called "Voice of Yerevan" was transmitted in Armenia. The first test programmes were mainly folk music programmes regularly interrupted by local news, putting into operation the first radio station in Armenia. This created new wide-range perspectives for moving the amateur radio movement forward, and planned development of radio and wired broadcasting networks. The creation of radio station made it possible to use radio broadcasting as one of the most efficient mass media for informing and educating the population. That is why radio programs were expected to cover such topics, which would interest people of different specialities and meet their needs.

On June 15, 1927, Armenian Republican Radio started to broadcast its programmes on a regular basis. In the early years only Yerevan and surrounding villages were included in the broadcasting radius. Due to efforts of a group of radio lovers, radio service was provided in more than 25 villages in 1927, and in another 40 the following year.

On April 6, 1927, national print media published the first radio program consisting of news and concerts.

Until 1929 actors and journalists from newspaper editorials were being invited to conduct the radio programmes. And only in December 1929 the first radio hosts - Vergine Babayan and Suren Kananyan were invited to work at the Republican Radio of Armenia.

At the end of 1929 the Republican radio committee was formed. The committee had 12 employees and annually aired 2,160-hour programmes. In 1930s the audience was significantly expanded. New technical and creative capabilities were put in use.

During the post-war period the Republican radio opened a number of new editorial departments, extended the radius of radio transmissions, in 1947 started to operate the second channel (music and information), created new programmes and projects, increased broadcasting hours, as well as expanded its audience. In 1947 the radio committee was reorganised into radio informative committee attached to the Council of Ministers of the Armenian Soviet Socialist Republic.

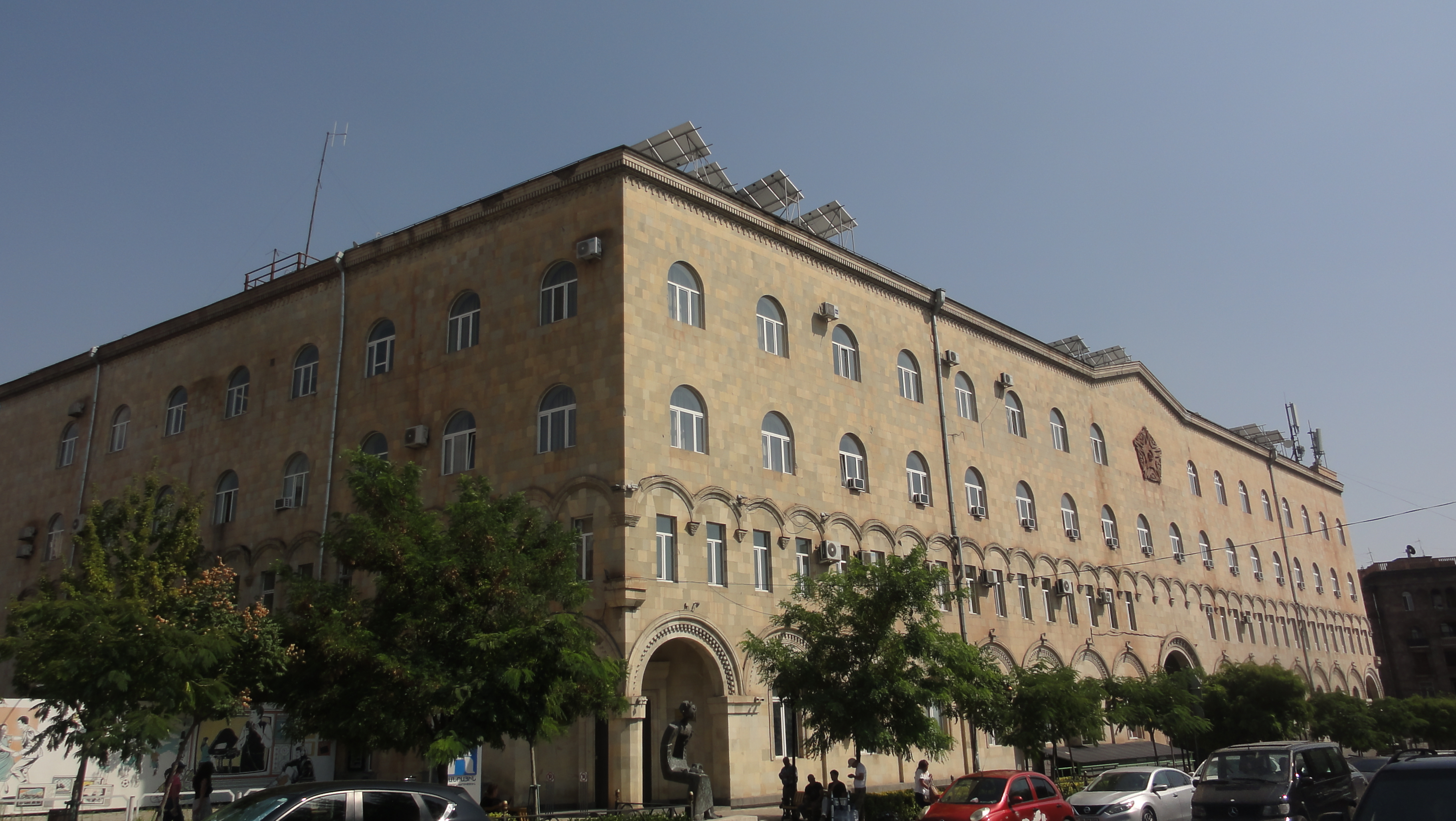
Public Radio building in Yerevan (2025)

The building of new radio transmitters was put into operation in 1957. In 1962 the whole territory of Armenia was provided with radio service. In 1965 an editorial compilation fund for recordings for author performances and radio records was formed. Radio Gold Fund contains more than 20,000 (150,000 hours) sound records, music performances, art and poetry programs and radio performances.

== Radio Day ==
Radio Day is a celebration of the development of radio. It is marked on 7 May, the day in 1895 on which Alexander Popov successfully demonstrated his invention. Radio Day was first observed in the Soviet Union in 1945. It emphasises the importance and role of radio in political, social and cultural life of the country.

== Membership of the EBU ==
The Public Television and Radio Company of Armenia is a member of this professional association of national broadcasters, the European Broadcasting Union. It had previously been an associated member of the EBU. Thus, the Public Radio of Armenia gained the right to rebroadcast programs and participate in the projects of EBU.

In 2007, the "Arevik" junior ensemble of Public Radio of Armenia was selected to represent Armenia for the first time at Junior Eurovision Song Contest 2007 in Rotterdam, the Netherlands. Arevik came second for Armenia with the song Erazanq.

In 2013 Public Radio of Armenia launched a web portal, with the help of the EBU, that connects producers and audiences of radio programmes targeted at young people across Europe. The LyunSe International portal aggregates current affairs stories from youth radio programmes across Europe and encourages interaction through a set of specialised forums. The portal's development was supported by the EBU Partnership Programme and developed in Yerevan and Geneva.

== International news ==
On August 8, 1947, the decision was made to create an editorial group, which would prepare radio programs for Armenians living abroad. The first programme of this department was transmitted on Short Wave on August 10, 1947. In 1956, Radio Erevan began to broadcast daily news program in Kurdish. From 1957, in addition to broadcasts to the Middle East and Near East, broadcasts to the Western European countries were launched.

== National stations ==
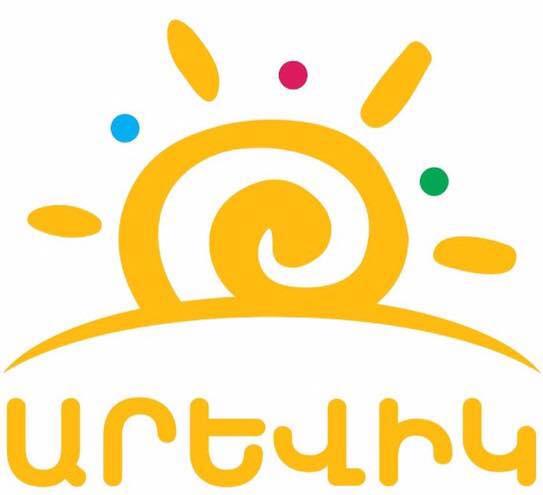
Radio Arevik logo (2019)

- Առաջին ծրագիր, Arrajin tsragir, 'First Programme' – flagship station with a varied format
- Իմ ռադիո, Im rradio, 'My Radio' – Youth-orientated music station
- Ռադիո Արևիկ (Radio Arevik) – children's music and programming
- Եզդի ռադիո, Yezdi rradio, 'Yazidi Radio' – station for Yazidis in Armenia
- Ռադիո Մշակույթ, Rradio Mshakuyt', 'Radio Culture' – culture, art and classical music

=== International service ===
International Public Radio of Armenia (Armenian: Հայաստանի հանրային ռադիո) is the international broadcasting service, established in 1967 under the label Radio Yerevan. It broadcasts in a number of languages, including Armenian, Kurdish, Arabic, Azerbaijani, English, Persian, French, Georgian, German, Russian, Spanish, and Turkish.

== Ensembles and orchestras ==
The following creative teams have been created and are functioning under the Public Radio of Armenia:

- Folk Instrument Ensemble named after Aram Merangulyan (founded in 1926, artistic director – Ruben Matevosyan)
- Variety Symphony Orchestra (founded in 1972, artistic director – Yervand Yerznkyan)
- Arevik Children's and Youth Pop and Folklore Ensemble (founded in 1979, artistic director – Armen Gevorgyan)
- Armenian National Radio Chamber Choir (founded in 1929, artistic director – Tigran Hekekyan until 2002)
- G. Achemyan National Radio Violin Ensemble of Armenia (founded in 1970, in 2003 reassigned to the Komitas State Conservatory of Yerevan)
- Ogan Duryan Symphony Orchestra of the National Radio of Armenia (founded in 1966)

== People ==
Lucy Kocharyan hosts two programs on Public Radio of Armenia, for which she was awarded an International Women of Courage Award for in 2020. Between 2014 and 2018, Haje Bakoyan was the editor-in-chief of Public Radio of Armenia's Yazidi service.

== See also ==
- Media of Armenia
- Public Television of Armenia
- Radio Yerevan jokes
