= Allium talyschense =

Scientific classification
- Kingdom: Plantae
- Clade: Tracheophytes
- Clade: Angiosperms
- Clade: Monocots
- Order: Asparagales
- Family: Amaryllidaceae
- Subfamily: Allioideae
- Genus: Allium
- Species: A. talyschense

Binomial name
- Allium talyschense Miscz. ex Grossh.

Synonyms
- No recorded synonyms

Species of flowering plant

Allium talyschense is a critically endangered species of wild onion native to the South Transcaucasia region of Armenia, between the villages Gnishik, Khachik and in Talish. A. talyschense has no conservation actions.

== Description ==
Its stem is 10–30 cm, it is also white or purplish and it has flat leaves. A. talyschense grows in subalpine belt, at 2200–2400 altitude above sea level in meters. It is a bulb-forming perennial with a scent resembling that of garlic or leeks.

== Distribution ==
Only one population in Armenia is known to have it. The species can get loss of the main habitat which is caused by internal factors. It wasn't included in the very first Red Data Book of Armenia. No subspecies are cataloged in the Catalogue of Life.
