= Tigran Hekekyan =

- Տիգրան Հեքեքյան
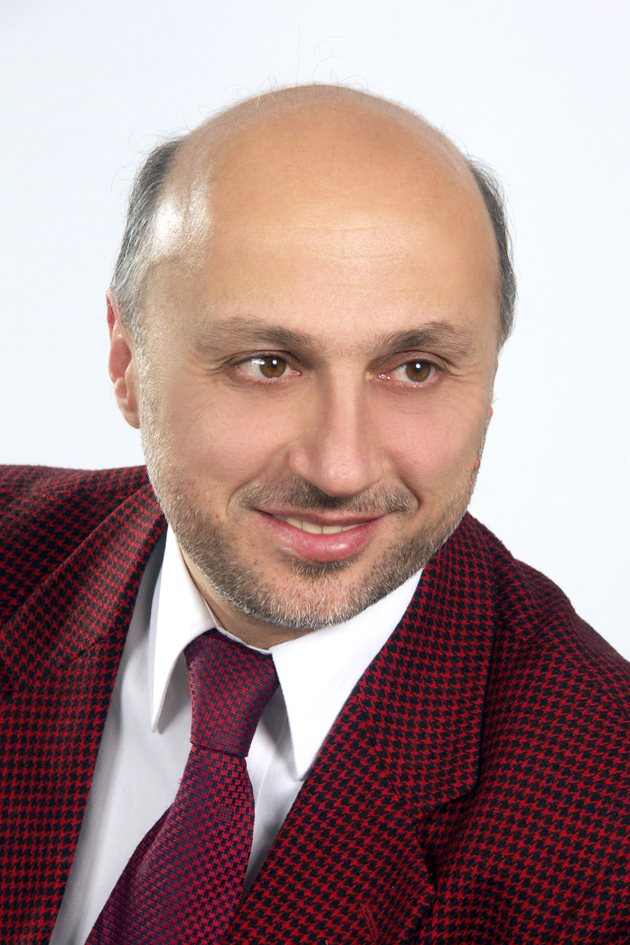
- Born: August 17, 1959 (age 67); Yerevan, Armenia
- Occupation: Choral Conductor
- Years active: 1982–present

Tigran Hekekyan (Armenian: Տիգրան Հեքեքյան, IPA: [tigˈɾɑn hɛkʰɛkʰˈjɑn], born 17 August 1959) is an Armenian conductor and music professor. He is the founder, artistic director, and principal conductor of the Little Singers of Armenia choir, as well as the founder and president of the Armenian Little Singers International Association. Hekekyan is a professor of conducting at the Yerevan Komitas State Conservatory. He also served as the director of the Sayat-Nova Music School until August 14, 2024.

== Biography ==
Hekekyan is a graduate of the Sayat-Nova Music School (1975, Piano Department) and Romanos Melikian Music College (1979, Choral Department) in Yerevan. He graduated from the Khachatur Abovian Armenian State Pedagogical University in 1982. In 1986, he completed his postgraduate studies in conducting at the Yerevan Komitas State Conservatory, where he has been teaching since 1985, as a professor since 1999. He has also been the director of the Sayat-Nova Music School since 2003. Hekekyan has established and worked with the Children's Choir of the Spendiaryan Music School (1982–1988), the Female Choir of the Committee of Youth Organization (1986–1988), the Armenian National Radio Chamber Choir (1984–2002), and the Little Singers of Armenia (1992–present).

== Festivals and competitions ==
With the establishment of the Little Singers of Armenia, Hekekyan won two silver medals at the Roodepoort International Eisteddfod, South Africa in 1993, a silver medal at the Llangollen International Musical Eisteddfod, Wales in 1994, and a grand prix and two gold and silver medals at the Golden Gate International Children's and Youth Choral Festival, San Francisco, USA in 1995.

Hekekyan and the Little Singers of Armenia have participated in the European Festival of Youth Choirs (Basel, Switzerland, 1995, 2014), Hong Kong and Beijing International Festivals (China, 1999), Golden Ferry (Sochi, Russia, 2001), Dimitria International Festival (Thessaloniki, Greece, 2002), Armenian-American Choral Festival Song of Unity (Armenia, 2004, 2006), Children's Friendship on the Planet (Moscow, Russia, 2010), Let the Future Sing International Festival (Stockholm, Sweden, 2012), 5th Children's Choir Festival (Thessaloniki, Greece, 2015), Choral Festival in Fribourg (Switzerland, 2016), Abu Ghosh Vocal Music Festival (Israel, 2017), International Children's Choir Festival (Dresden, Germany, 2018), Tbilisi Choral Music Festival (Georgia, 2018), Interkultur Video Award (2020), Moscow Meets Friends International Festival (2020), Voices of Spirit International Choral Festival (Austria, 2021), World Peace Choral Festival (Austria, 2021), 25th Children of the World in Harmony International Youth Choir Festival (2021), Choral Photo Promenade Photo Contest of the Europa Cantat Festival (2021), Soong Ching Ling International Youth Exchange Camp (2021), GCI 2nd Annual Virtual Holiday Concert (2021), and the XIV International Sacred Music Festival Silver Bells (2022). The choir has also participated in Expo 2000 (Hanover, Germany) and the Sixth World Symposium on Choral Music (Minneapolis, Minnesota, USA, 2002).

Hekekyan has performed extensively in Russia, Georgia, Latvia, Lithuania, Estonia, the Netherlands, Germany, France, Belgium, Switzerland, Denmark, Israel, Japan, the UK, Spain, Poland, the Czech Republic, Austria, the US, Canada, Cyprus, Egypt, Greece, Australia, South Africa, and China.

He participates as a jury member in international choral competitions such as the World Choir Games, the International Chamber Choir Competition Marktoberdorf, and the Armenian Little Singers Choral Composition Competition.

Hekekyan is the founder and artistic director of several festivals such as the 1st International Festival of Choral Art in Armenia Ashtarak 93; Yerevan 96; Singing Armenia, 2001, held annually since 2006; United by Song, 2000; Song of Unity, 2004 and 2006; and With Song and Love, 2021.

== Awards and recognition ==
In 1996, Hekekyan was awarded the Movses Khorenatsi Medal by the President of Armenia for his contributions to the advancement of Armenian culture. He was nominated as Cultural Ambassador of Europe by the European Federation of Choirs in 2001. He has also been awarded the Leonardo da Vinci Silver Medal by the European Academy of Natural Sciences with the Little Singers of Armenia. In 2010, Hekekyan received the honorary title of Honoured Pedagogue of the Republic of Armenia from the President of Armenia.

Hekekyan is a member of the International Federation for Choral Music, European Federation of Young Choirs, International Society for Children's Choral and Performing Arts, International Choir Olympic Council of the Interkultur Foundation, European Academy of Natural Sciences, and the International Academy of Sciences of Nature and Society and is an honorary academician of the Academy of Television and Radio of Armenia. He was the artistic director of the Children and Youth International Festival Golden Ferry organized by PABSEC in 2001 and 2002 and the Aram Khachaturian Centenary Committee in 2003.

Hekekyan has won the Best Classical Album award at the 2001 Armenian Music Awards for his album Parsegh Ganatchian: Complete Works.

== Discography ==
Little Singers of Armenia — Fuga A

Little Singers of Armenia — Rural Images

Radio Choir of RA — "Miss My Homeland"

Radio Choir of RA — "With a Sweet Dream"

- The Little Singers of Armenia at Gewandhaus Concert Hall (2020);
- The Little Singers of Armenia at the Berlin Philharmonic Concert Hall (2019);
- The Little Singers of Armenia at Victoria Hall (2019);
- The Little Singers of Armenia at St. Michael Church, Fribourg (2019);
- The Little Singers of Armenia at the Tokyo Opera City Concert Hall (2019);
- The Little Singers of Armenia at Tchaikovsky Concert Hall (2019);
- Heartful Song for Japan (Japan, 2017);
- Benjamin Britten: Choral Works for Children's Choir (Switzerland, 2016);
- I Remember and Demand (Armenia, 2015);
- 20 Years of Magic (USA, 2013);
- Furusato (USA, 2012);
- Edgar Hovhannisyan: Choral Works, double album (Armenia, 2011);
- Robert Petrosyan's Choral Songs Written for the Little Singers of Armenia (Armenia, 2011);
- Fiat Lux, triple album (United States, 2009; digital distribution 2020);
- Khachatur Avetisyan: Oratorium in Memory of the Armenian Great Catastrophe 1915 (Turkey, 2009);
- Sacred Music (5th–20th centuries) (Armenia, 2002);
- Parsegh Ganatchian: Complete Works, triple album (USA, 2000);
- Khachatur Avetisyan: Oratorium in Memory of the Victims of the Armenian Genocide of 1915 (USA, France, 1995);
- Songs of Love and Death (Russia, 1993);
- Armenian Choral Music (USA, 1992);
- Khachatur Avetisyan: Oratorium in Memory of the Victims of the Armenian Genocide of 1915 (Netherlands, 1989).
