= Little Singers of Armenia =

Armenian children's choir

- Choir
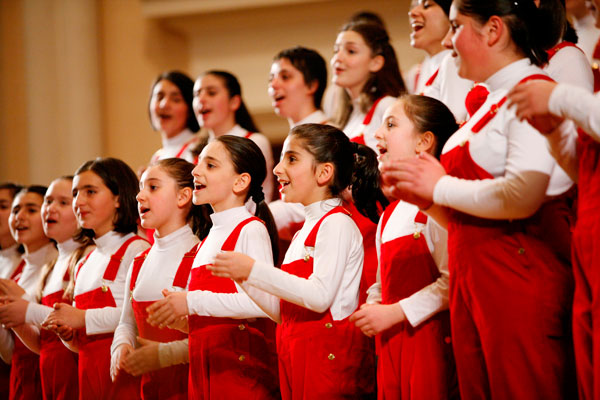
- Little Singers of Armenia
- Founded: 1992
- Founder: Tigran Hekekyan
- Genre: Varied
- Members: 40 girls aged 8–18
- Music director: Tigran Hekekyan
- Website: www.als.am/en

Little Singers of Armenia (Armenian: Հայաստանի փոքրիկ երգիչներ) is a children's choir founded in Yerevan, Armenia in 1992. The choir is typically made up of 40 members who are mostly girls aged 8 to 18. The choir actively performs in Armenia and abroad. It has participated in many international festivals, governmental projects, and charity concerts. The founder, artistic director, and principal conductor of the choir is Tigran Hekekyan.

== Description ==
The choir was founded on 6 November 1992 under the auspices of the Armenian Little Singers International Association and the Yerevan Municipality, bringing together talented youths from Yerevan and surrounding provinces. This choir has become an international sensation with its diverse repertoire which includes sacred, medieval, renaissance, classical, jazz, and contemporary music.

== Activities and festivals ==
The choir has performed extensively in the United Kingdom, France, Germany, Sweden, Switzerland, Belgium, Russia, Latvia, Poland, Greece, Cyprus, Japan, Egypt, South Africa, Canada, 20 states of the United States of America, Denmark, and the Netherlands.

The choir has participated in various international festivals including the European Festival of Youth Choirs (Basel, Switzerland, 1995, 2014), Hong Kong and Beijing International Festivals (China, 1999), Golden Ferry (Sochi, Russia, 2001), Dimitria International Festival (Thessaloniki, Greece, 2002), Armenian-American Choral Festival Song of Unity (Armenia, 2004, 2006), Children's Friendship on the Planet (Moscow, Russia, 2010), Let the Future Sing International Festival (Stockholm, Sweden, 2012), 5th Children's Choir Festival (Thessaloniki, Greece, 2015), Choral Festival in Fribourg (Switzerland, 2016), Abu Ghosh Vocal Music Festival (Israel, 2017), International Children's Choir Festival (Dresden, Germany, 2018), Tbilisi Choral Music Festival (Georgia, 2018), Interkultur Video Award (2020), Moscow Meets Friends International Festival (2020), Voices of Spirit International Choral Festival (Austria, 2021), World Peace Choral Festival (Austria, 2021), 25th Children of the World in Harmony International Youth Choir Festival (2021), Choral Photo Promenade Photo Contest of the Europa Cantat Festival (2021), Soong Ching Ling International Youth Exchange Camp (2021), GCI 2nd Annual Virtual Holiday Concert (2021), XIV International Sacred Music Festival Silver Bells (2022). The choir has also participated in EXPO 2000 (Hanover, Germany) and the Sixth World Symposium on Choral Music (Minneapolis, Minnesota, USA, 2002).

The Little Singers of Armenia have participated in many significant state programmes such as the Cultural Days of Armenia in Russia (2001, 2006), the 80th anniversary of Charles Aznavour in Paris (2004) and the Year of Armenia in France (2007), Solemn ceremony of the visit of Pope Francis to Armenia (2016), Solemn opening ceremony of the seventeenth summit of the Francophonie (2018), in the scopes of the 150th anniversary of Komitas Vardapet, the Little Singers of Armenia choir is invited to Gewandhaus Children's Choir in Leipzig, and Lithuanian Ugnelė Children's Choir (2019).

== Awards and competitions ==
The choir has had many competitive achievements, such as two silver medals at the Eisteddfod in Roodepoort, South Africa in 1993, a silver medal at the Eisteddfod in Llangollen, Wales in 1994, and a grand prix and two gold and silver medals at the Golden Gate International Children's and Youth Choral Festival, San Francisco, USA in 1995.

The Little Singers of Armenia were recognized as a Choir of the European Union, nominated as Cultural Ambassador by the European Federation of Choirs in 2001 and awarded the Leonardo da Vinci Silver Medal by the European Academy of Natural Sciences. In 2002, the choir was recognized as one of the best choirs in the world by the International Federation for Choral Music. The choir has also received some of the highest awards bestowed by the President of Armenia as well as the country's Ministry of Culture and the Ministry of Science and Education, and the Mayor of Yerevan.

== Recordings ==
The choir has several recordings, among which is Parsegh Ganatchian: Complete Works (USA, 2000), 5th-20th century sacred music (Armenia, 2002). The choir has also released a triple-disc album, Fiat Lux (USA, 2009) and Robert Petrosyan's Songs Written for the Little Singers of Armenia Choir (Armenia, 2011). The album Furusato (USA, 2012) is dedicated to concert tour of Japan, 20 Years of Music (USA, 2013) is dedicated to the 20th anniversary of the choir, I Remember and Demand (Yerevan, 2015) dedicated to the 100th anniversary of the Armenian genocide, Benjamin Britten: Choral works for children choirs (Switzerland, 2016), Heartful Song for Japan (Japan, 2017), The Little Singers of Armenia at the Berlin Philharmonic Concert Hall, The Little Singers of Armenia at Victoria Hall, The Little Singers of Armenia at St. Michael Church, Fribourg, The Little Singers of Armenia at the Tokyo Opera City Concert Hall, The Little Singers of Armenia at Tchaikovsky Concert Hall (2019), and The Little Singers of Armenia at Gewandhaus Concert Hall (2020).

Many of these CDs have won national and international awards.
