= Anahit Perikhanian =

Anahit Georgievna Perikhanian (24 April 1928 – 27 May 2012) was a Soviet-born Armenian academic. An Iranologist, Perikhanian specialized in Sasanian jurisprudence, history and society. In addition to her work on many aspects of ancient and medieval Iran, Perikhanian was also interested in ancient inscriptions of Asia Minor and the Middle East, as well as Middle Iranian languages and Armenian language. She also spent much time researching Armenian philology and etymology, especially in relation to Iranian loanwords in the Armenian language, and contributed to the understanding of Aramaic inscriptions found in Armenia.

== Biography ==
Perikhanian was born in Moscow on 24 April 1928 to Georg and Arusyak Perikhanian. She attended school in Moscow and pursued further education in the Armenian SSR. From 1945 to 1948, Perikhanian studied Middle Persian (Pahlavi) at Yerevan State University with Rouben Abrahamian, another Armenian Iranologist and linguist. She subsequently moved to Leningrad (Saint Petersburg), and finished her postgraduate at Leningrad State University (Saint Petersburg State University) in 1951.

In 1952, Perikhanian published her first article. From 1953 to 1955, she pursued postgraduate studies under Kamilla Trever. From 1956 to 1959, she worked at the Institute of Oriental Studies of the Russian Academy of Sciences in Moscow and at its branch in Leningrad. Initially a research fellow, Perikhanian became a senior research associate in 1974, and a leading research associate in 1986 at the Department of Ancient Near Eastern studies. She also assisted in deciphering numerous Pahlavi papyri from the Pushkin Museum.

Perikhanian also studied under Igor M. Diakonoff. She performed research on the Mādagān ī hazār dādestān and published her research in Leningrad as part of her doctoral thesis. It received critical acclaim and made her famous in the scholarly community. Some twenty-four years later, Nina Garsoïan edited the original and translated it into English. According to fellow Iranologist Alireza Shapour Shahbazi, Perikhanian's work was "indispensable for all students of Iranian studies". In 1995, Perikhanian delivered several lectures on Sassanian law and property at the Center for Iranian Studies at Columbia University. She retired in 1998.

In addition to her work on many aspects of ancient and medieval Iran, Perikhanian was also interested in ancient inscriptions of Asia Minor and the Middle East, as well as Middle Iranian languages and Armenian language. She also spent much time researching Armenian philology and etymology, especially in relation to Iranian loanwords in the Armenian language, and contributed to the understanding of Aramaic inscriptions found in Armenia.

In her last publication (an article), Perikhanian researched the Paulicians, a Christian sect. Perikhanian noted that the Paulicians originated among Iranian Christians, and flourished in Armenia and the eastern provinces (themes) of the Byzantine Empire. Perikhanian added that the word "Paulician" was derived from Middle Persian and Parthian pāvlīk which translates as "a follower of the apostle Paul". From 2001 to 2002, Perikhanian held several orations on Classical Armenian at the Saint Petersburg State University.

Perikhanian died in Saint Petersburg on 27 May 2012.

== Sources ==
- Ambartsumian, Arthur (2014). "PERIKHANIAN, ANAHIT". In Yarshater, Ehsan (ed.). Encyclopædia Iranica (Online ed.). Encyclopædia Iranica Foundation.
