= Armenian National Radio Chamber Choir =

Armenian chamber choir founded in 1929

- Born: 1929 (age 96–97); Yerevan, Armenia.
- Occupation: Chamber choir
- Years active: 1929–

The Armenian Radio Chamber Choir is an Armenian chamber choir founded in 1929.

== Biography ==
The Armenian National Radio Chamber Choir was founded in 1929. Its artistic director and conductor was Martin Mazmanyan, under whose baton the choir won First Prize in a competition including choirs from all Soviet republics in 1931. Tatoul Altounyan, Aram Ter Hovhannisyan, and Karo Zakaryan followed Mazmanyan as artistic directors. Following a hiatus, the choir was re-established in 1979. From 1979 to 1984, well known Armenian composer Edgar Hovhannisyan was the artistic director and Haroutyoun Topikyan conducted the choir. From 1984 to 2002, Tigran Hekekyan was both the choir's artistic director and conductor.

== Concerts and festivals ==
The Armenian National Radio Chamber Choir has performed in numerous well known international festivals from 1980 to 1993, in Austria, the Baltic countries, France, Georgia, Germany, the Netherlands, Hungary, Israel, Japan, Poland, Russia, Spain, Switzerland, and Uzbekistan. They have also given many benefit concerts. From 1988 to 1993 all concerts given were in support of Nagorno-Karabagh; in 1990 all proceeds from a concert given in Lithuania were donated to a children's fund in Lithuania; in 1991 they recorded a CD in the Netherlands and the proceeds of its sale—US $100,000—were donated to the victims of the 1988 devastating earthquake in Armenia.

== Awards ==
The choir and its soloists have won medals and prizes at the following prestigious international competitions:

2 Gold, 1 Silver Medals Roodepoort International Music Competition, Roodepoort, South African Republic 1991.

3rd Prize, Arnhem International Choir Festival, Arnhem, the Netherlands 1991.

1 Gold Medal, Grand Prix, Takarazuka International Choral Competition, Takarazuka, Japan 1992.

== Repertoire and Recordings ==
Hundreds of the choir's performances have been preserved as Gold Discs. The choir has a rich repertoire, including arrangements of Armenian folk music, and Armenian, European and American sacred, classical, contemporary, and jazz compositions. They have recorded 4 LPs in the Netherlands and Russia, and 4 CDs in France, the Netherlands, Russia, and the United States of America.

== Membership ==
Since 1991, the Armenian National Radio Chamber Choir is a member of the European Federation of Young Choirs – EUROPA CANTAT.
