= Abramyan =

Abramyan (Abraamyan) (Armenian: Աբրահամյան) is an Armenian surname. Notable people with the surname include:

- Ara Abramyan (born 1957), Armenian-Russian businessman
- Evgeny Aramovich Abramyan (1930–2014), Armenian physicist

== See also ==
- Abrahamian
- Abrahamyan
