= Haje Bakoyan =

Armenian Yezidi activist (born 1974)

- Հաջե Բաքոյան
- Born: 1974 (age 51–52); Armenia
- Education: Meshrop Mashtots University
- Occupation: Human rights activist
- Years active: 2014–present
- Employer: Public Radio of Armenia (2014–2018)
- Known for: Advocacy for Yazidi women in Armenia

Haje Bakoyan (Armenian: Հաջե Բաքոյան; born c. 1974) is a Yazidi human rights activist from Armenia. She is known for her advocacy for Yazidi women by promoting their access to education.

== Biography ==
Bakoyan was born and raised in a Yazidi family in Armenia. She was married at the age of 18 and did not finish high school, moving to work on her husband's family's dairy farm. When she attempted to finish high school, she faced resistance from her family. Bakoyan ultimately resumed her studies at the age of 49 when she started studying psychology and philology at Meshrop Mashtots University.

For many years, Bakoyan worked as a Kurmanji teacher at several Yazidi schools in Taperakan. In 2014, Bakoyan began working for the Yazidi department of Public Radio of Armenia, acting as its editor-in-chief until 2018.

In 2014, Bakoyan established Shams Humanitarian NGO, a non-governmental organisation that worked to challenge gender norms within the Yazidi community in Armenia, primarily in Ararat Province. Bakoyan has criticised the Yazidi cultural expectation of girls ending their education to marry, which she said prevented girls from having dreams for the future outside of marriage and motherhood. She has advocated the need for familial support, a community environment and access to education as necessary for the empowerment of Yazidi women. Bakoyan disagrees that women empowerment is contrary to Yezidi customs and traditions and believes attitudes against stem from worries about girls being far from home; financial hardship; and traditions that stigmatise women's education. Bakoyan also established Life Starts Anew After 40 with support from the Women's Fund Armenia, which targets women who believe their lives cannot change. This included through providing professional training, mental health workshops, and community projects, and stressing the importance of employment and finance.

Bakoyan has criticised the lack of mechanisms to prevent early marriage or restrictions on girls' education. While she supported the Armenian government's repeal of a law that permitted children aged 16 and 17 to marry with parental consent, she has stated that the change in law has not been widely accepted in Yazidi communities.

During the COVID-19 pandemic in Armenia and the Nagoro-Karabakh conflict, Bakoyan provided emergency relief to Yazidi communities.
