= Gayane Abrahamyan =

Armenian politician and journalist

Member of the National Assembly
- In office 14 January 2019 – 25 September 2020

Personal details
- Born: July 2, 1979 (age 45)
- Political party: My Step Alliance
- Children: 2
- Education: Yerevan State Academy of Fine Arts; International Center for Journalists

Gayane Abrahamyan (born 2 July 1979) is an Armenian politician and journalist who served in the National Assembly.

== Early life ==
Gayane Abrahamyan was born on 2 July 1979. She graduated from the Yerevan State Academy of Fine Arts in 2007, and from the International Center for Journalists in 2009.

== Career ==
=== Journalism ===
From 1997 to 2001, Abrahamyan served as the coordinator of the Little Singers of Armenia. She worked as a journalist for Armenia Now and Armenian International Magazine, as an Armenian correspondent for International Eurasianet, and as a correspondent with The Guardian and One Magazine.

=== Politics ===
On 9 December 2018, she was elected as a member of the National Assembly as a member of the My Step Alliance. During her tenure in the National Assembly she served on the Standing Committee on European Integration committee. She also served as the head of Armenia's delegation to the Euronest Parliamentary Assembly after Mkhitar Hayrapetyan stepped down as head of the delegation and as co-president of the organization. Abrahamyan resigned on September 25, 2020.
