= Lucy Kocharyan =

Armenian journalist (born 1984)

- Լյուսի Քոչարյան
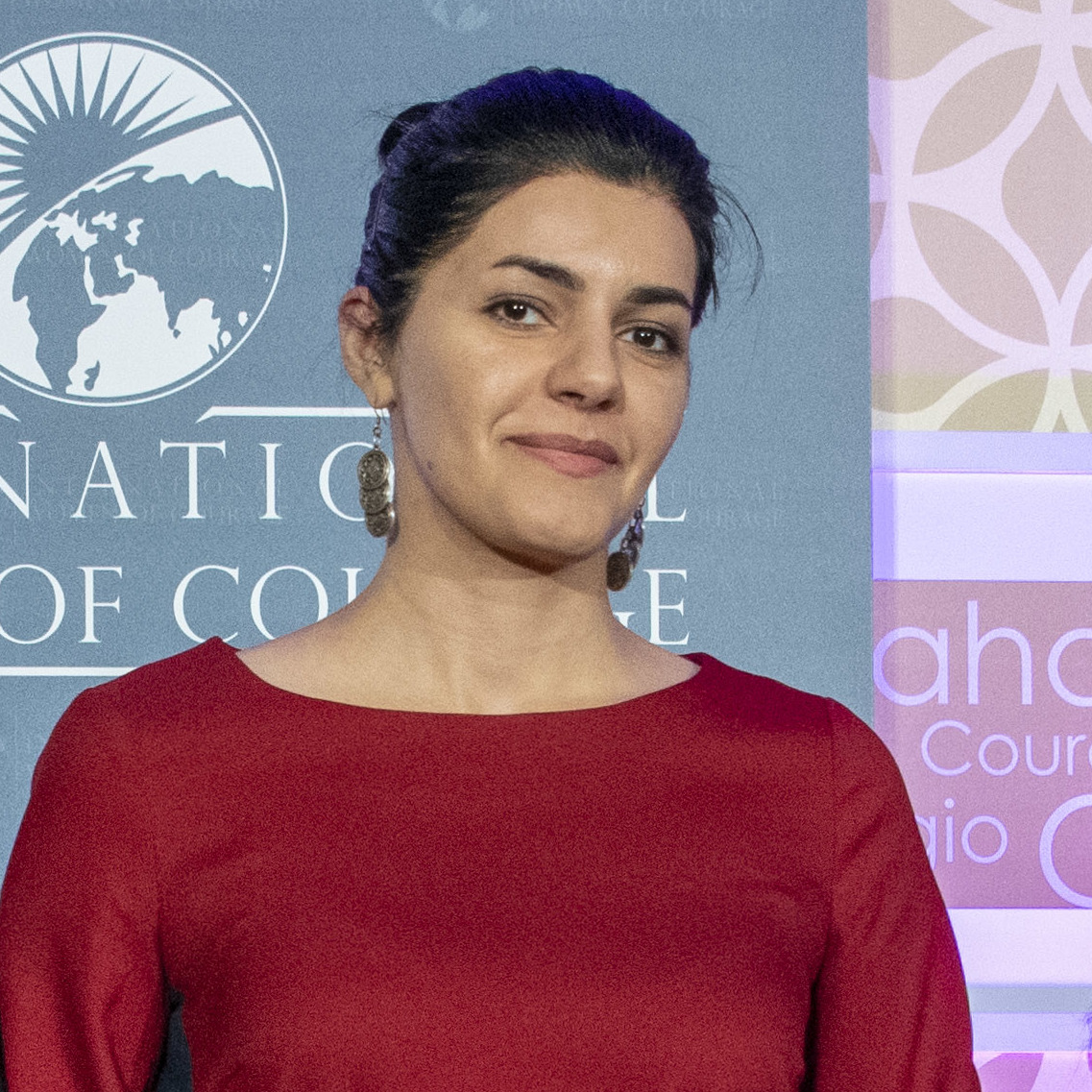
- Born: 1984 (age 41–42)
- Other names: Lusine Kocharyan
- Occupations: journalist, radio host, blogger
- Employer: Armenian Public Radio
- Known for: Voice of Violence campaign against domestic and sexual violence

Lucy Kocharyan (Armenian: Լյուսի Քոչարյան; born 1984) is an Armenian journalist, radio host, and blogger known for having taken a stand in her country against gender-based violence. She was chosen as an International Women of Courage in March 2020 by the US Secretary of State, the first Armenian to win this award.

== Life ==
Kocharyan was born in 1984. She works as a journalist, radio host, and blogger. She presents two programmes on Armenian Public Radio where she raises issues of health, women and children.

In August 2018 she began to speak out about children with mental health issues and gender-based violence, launching the "Voice of Violence" (Brnutian Dzayne) campaign on Facebook in July 2019. The upsurge was prompted by a report about the case of a Czech girl named Eva who faced sexual violence in Armenia with little help or assistance afterwards. Kocharyan created a hashtag and was surprised to find that many others shared similar experiences to Eva. Gender-based violence is a traditional part of Armenia and she has faced a lot of criticism for her position.

She was chosen as an International Women of Courage in March 2020 by the US Secretary of State. The award was presented by First lady Melania Trump and Secretary of State Mike Pompeo on 4 March 2020 at Washington, D.C. The ceremony was attended by Anna Hakobyan, the spouse of the Prime Minister of Armenia.
