= Erebuni-Yerevan =

English: 'Erebuni-Yerevan'
- Էրեբունի-Երևան
- City anthem of Yerevan, Armenia
- Lyrics: Paruyr Sevak
- Music: Edgar Hovhannisyan
- Adopted: 27 September 2004

"Erebuni-Yerevan" is the municipal anthem of the Armenian capital of Yerevan, officially adopted in 2004. On 27 September 2004, the city of Yerevan adopted the song as the anthem after a competition for a new flag and anthem. It was composed by Edgar Hovhannisyan, with lyrics written by Paruyr Sevak. The song was performed for the first time in October 1968 during the 2750th anniversary of the founding of Yerevan.

== Lyrics ==
=== Current official ===
Armenian original

Երևան դարձած իմ Էրեբունի,
Դու մեր նոր Դվին, մեր նոր Անի։
Մեր փոքրիկ հողի դու մեծ երազանք,
Մեր դարե կարոտ, մեր քարե նազանք։

Երևան դարձա՜ծ իմ Էրեբունի,
Դարեր ես անցել, բայց մնացել ես պատանի։
Քո Մասիս հորով, քո Արաքս մորով,
Մեծանաս դարով, Երևա՜ն։

Մենք արյան կանչեր ունենք մեր սրտում,
Անկատար տենչեր ունենք դեռ շատ։
Մեր կանչն առանց քեզ իզուր կկորչի,
Առանց քեզ մեր տաք տենչն էլ կսառչի։

Երևան դարձա՜ծ իմ Էրեբունի…

Կյանքում ամեն սեր լինում է տարբեր,
Իսկ մենք բոլորս էլ քեզնով արբել։
Տաք է սերը մեր շեկ քարերիդ պես,
Հին է սերը մեր ձիգ դարերիդ պես։

Երևան դարձա՜ծ իմ Էրեբունի…

Armenian Latin alphabet

Yerevan dardzats im Erebuni,
Du mer nor Dvin, mer nor Ani.
Mer p’vok’rik hoghi du mets yerazank’,
Mer dare karot, mer k’are nazank’.

Yerevan dardza՜ts im Erebuni,
Darer yes ants’el, bayts’ mnats’el yes patani.
K’vo Masis horov, k’vo Arak’s morov,
Metsanas darov, Yereva՜n.

Menk’ aryan kanch’er unenk’ mer srtum,
Ankatar tench’er unenk’ derr shat.
Mer kanch’n arrants’ k’ez izur kkorch’i,
Arrants’ k’ez mer tak’ tench’n el ksarrch’i.

Yerevan dardza՜ts im Erebuni…

Kyank’um amen ser linum e tarber,
Isk menk’ bolors el k’eznov arbel.
Tak’ e sery mer shek k’arerid pes,
Hin e sery mer dzig darerid pes.

Yerevan dardza՜ts im Erebuni…

English translation

My Erebuni that has become Yerevan,
You are our new Dvin, our new Ani.
You are the great dream of our small land,
Our longing for centuries, our stone grace.

My Erebuni that has become Yerevan,
Centuries have passed, but you have remained young.
With your Masis father, your Araks mother,
You have grown up through the centuries, Yerevan!

We have calls for blood in our hearts,
We still have many unfulfilled longings.
Our call will be lost in vain without you,
Without you our hot longing will also cool down.

My Erebuni that has become Yerevan…

Every love in life is different,
And we are all intoxicated with you.
Love is hot like our blond stones,
Love is old like our strong centuries.

My Erebuni that has become Yerevan…
