= Garo Zakarian =

Armenian–Soviet conductor and composer (1895–1967)

Garo Hovannesi Zakarian (Arm: Կարո Հովհաննեսի Զաքարյան; 15 December 1895, Van, Ottoman Empire - 11 May 1967, Yerevan, Armenian SSR), was a Soviet Armenian composer and conductor. He was named a People's Artist of Armenia in 1960.

== Biography ==
Zakarian studied music theory at the St. Petersburg Conservatory from 1916 to 1918. He was choirmaster and a teacher at the House of Armenian Arts in Tbilisi from 1921 to 1929, during which time he also graduated from the Tbilisi Conservatory in 1924. Zakarian moved to Yerevan in 1929, working as a lecturer at Yerevan State Conservatory in choral conducting. From 1938 to 1953 he was the head of the Yerevan Radio Chorus, and from 1949 a member of the CPSU.

Zakaryan was close to the musical language and origins of Armenian folk songs, and is known for his choral arrangements of Armenian folk songs. He composed the "Pioneer" Ballet (1937), "Coral" opera (1939, staged 1941) and operas "A." (1954 according to Khachatur Abovyan).
