= Ugnelė =

Lithuanian youth choir and music school

Coordinates: 54°40′57″N 25°15′48″E

Ugnelė (transl. little fire) is a children's choir and music school in Vilnius (Lithuania).

== History ==
The choir developed from folk and dance ensemble "Ugnelė", which was founded in 1954. In 2010, the ensemble split, and the choir, directed by Valerija Skapienė since 1999, moved to Vilnius J. Tallat-Kelpša Conservatoire. The choir worked there until 2016. In 2016, the choir moved to Queen Morta School. In 2017, the choir developed into a private music school, and moved to its separate headquarters in M. K. Čiurlionio street in Vilnius.

== Structure ==
There are 3 choirs in Ugnelė music school: preparatory, junior and main, as well as an Early Music Education Programme. There are 8 classes in total. All of the students learn choral singing as their primary subject, as well as solo singing, musical notation, piano, violin, guitar and movement. The school principal is Valerija Skapienė, its vice principal Ieva Krivickaitė.

== Competitions ==
Ugnelė's main choir (known also as Children's Choir Ugnelė) participates in Lithuanian and international choral competitions. Its recent awards include:

- 2019 Best Lithuanian Children's Choir and Conductor award, presented by the Lithuanian National Culture Centre
- 2018 Gold medals in Teenage choir and Folklore music categories at Bali International Choir Festival (Indonesia)
- 2017 First place in Children's choir and Folklore music categories and a Grand Prix nomination at Sibelius Choir Competition (Finland)
- 2015 Grand Prix, International Choir Competition "Mūsų dainose", Vievis (Lithuania)
- 2014 Best Children's Choir, Ohrid Choir Competition (Macedonia)
- 2014 Gold diploma, International Choir Competition "Cantate Domino", Kaunas (Lithuania)
- 2013 First category, International Sacred Music Competition "Silver Bells", Daugavpils (Latvia)
- 2002, 2008, 2011 First category, National Choir Competition "Mes - Lietuvos vaikai" (Lithuania)

== Projects ==
Ugnelė's teachers organize a variety of nation-wide events for children interested in music. The most important projects include:

- United Lithuanian Children's Choir, established in 2016 together with the Lithuanian National Culture Centre. The choir provides an opportunity to deepen their choral knowledge for children from across the country.
- Lithuanian Children's Choir Festival "Dainų mozaika", started in 2004.
- Books for teaching musical notation "Natukai"
- Vilnius City Kindergarten Festival "Katės pėdutė"
- Lithuanian Young Singers Competition "Cantabile"
- Lithuanian Young Pianists Festival "Nauji garsai"
