= Gnishik =

Gnishik Գնիշիկ
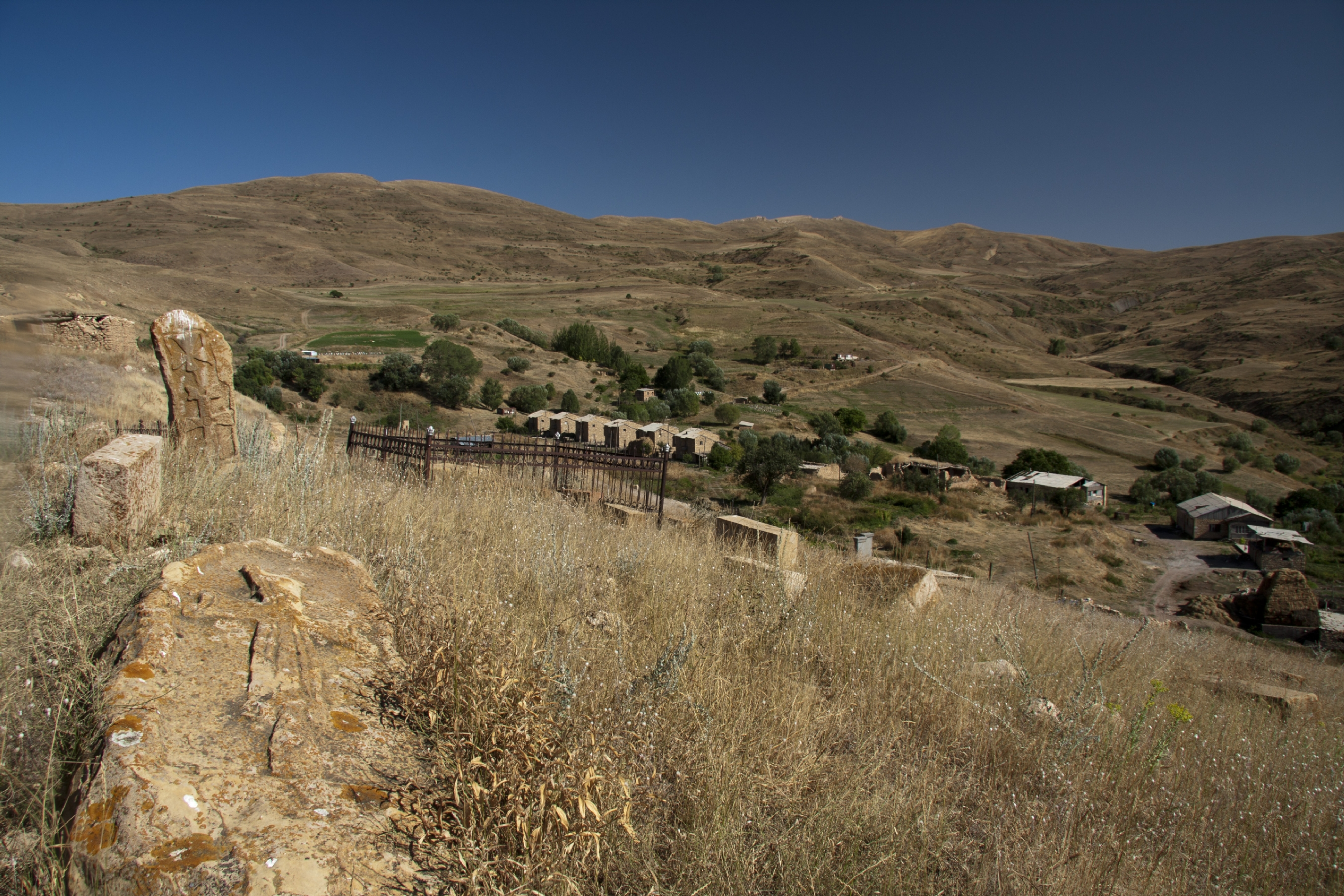

- Location within Armenia Location within Vayots Dzor
- Coordinates: 39°39′21″N 45°18′00″E
- Country: Armenia
- Province: Vayots Dzor
- Municipality: Areni

Population (2011)
  - Total: 44
- Time zone: UTC+4 (AMT)

Gnishik (Armenian: Գնիշիկ) is a village in the Areni Municipality of the Vayots Dzor Province in Armenia.

== Geography ==
Natural habitats vary from semi-desert to mountain steppes and meadows. The vicinity of Gnishik has been considered to be a Prime Butterfly Area, where a wide variety of rare butterflies, including Papilio alexanor, Colias chlorocoma, Pseudochazara schahrudensis, Tomares romanovi, Phengaris arion, and a number of others can be observed.

== Municipal administration ==
Gnishik was previously a community, which included the town of Mozrov, and had a combined population of 132 in 2011.

== Notable people ==
- Rouben Abrahamian

== Gallery ==
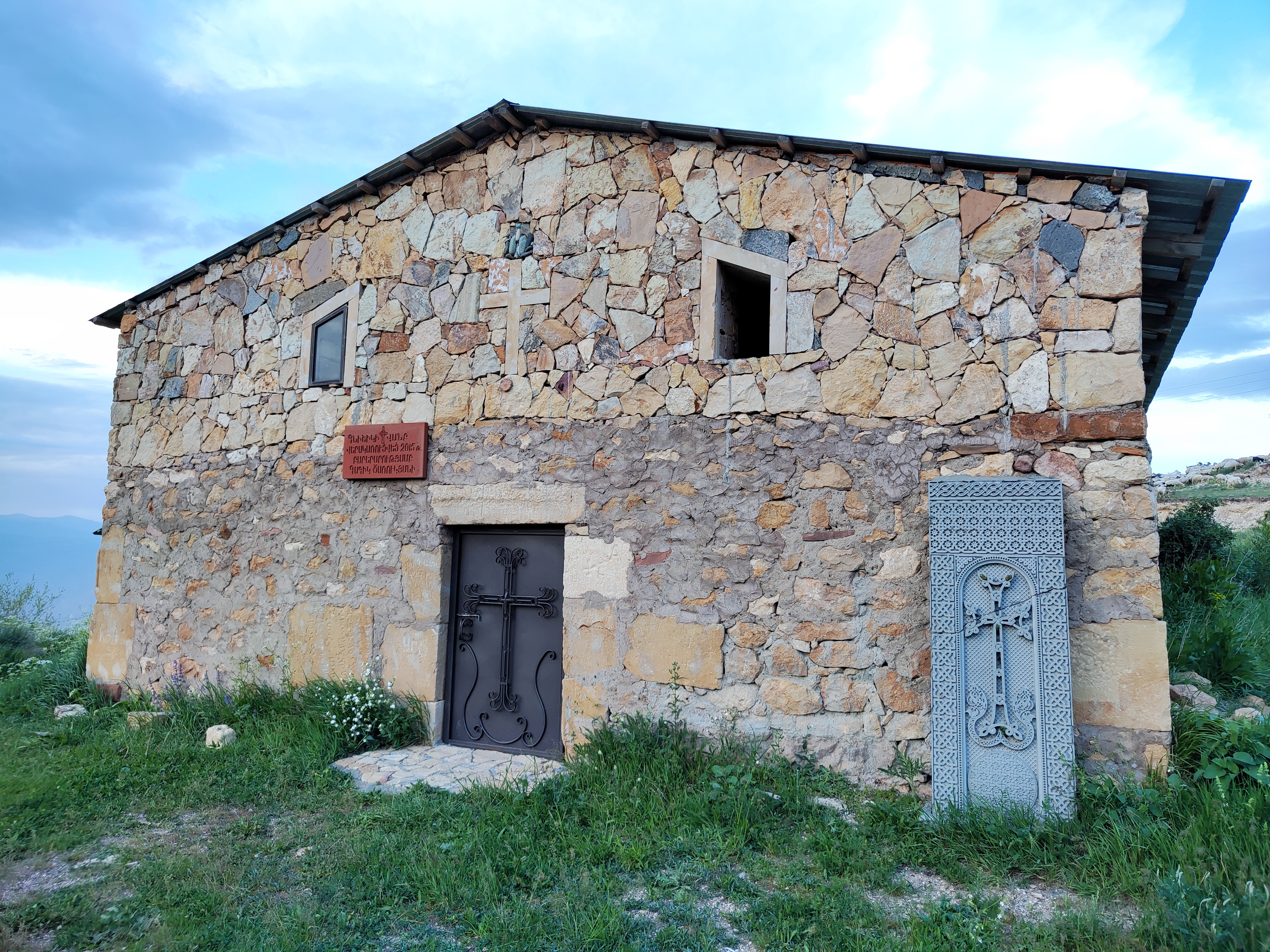
Church

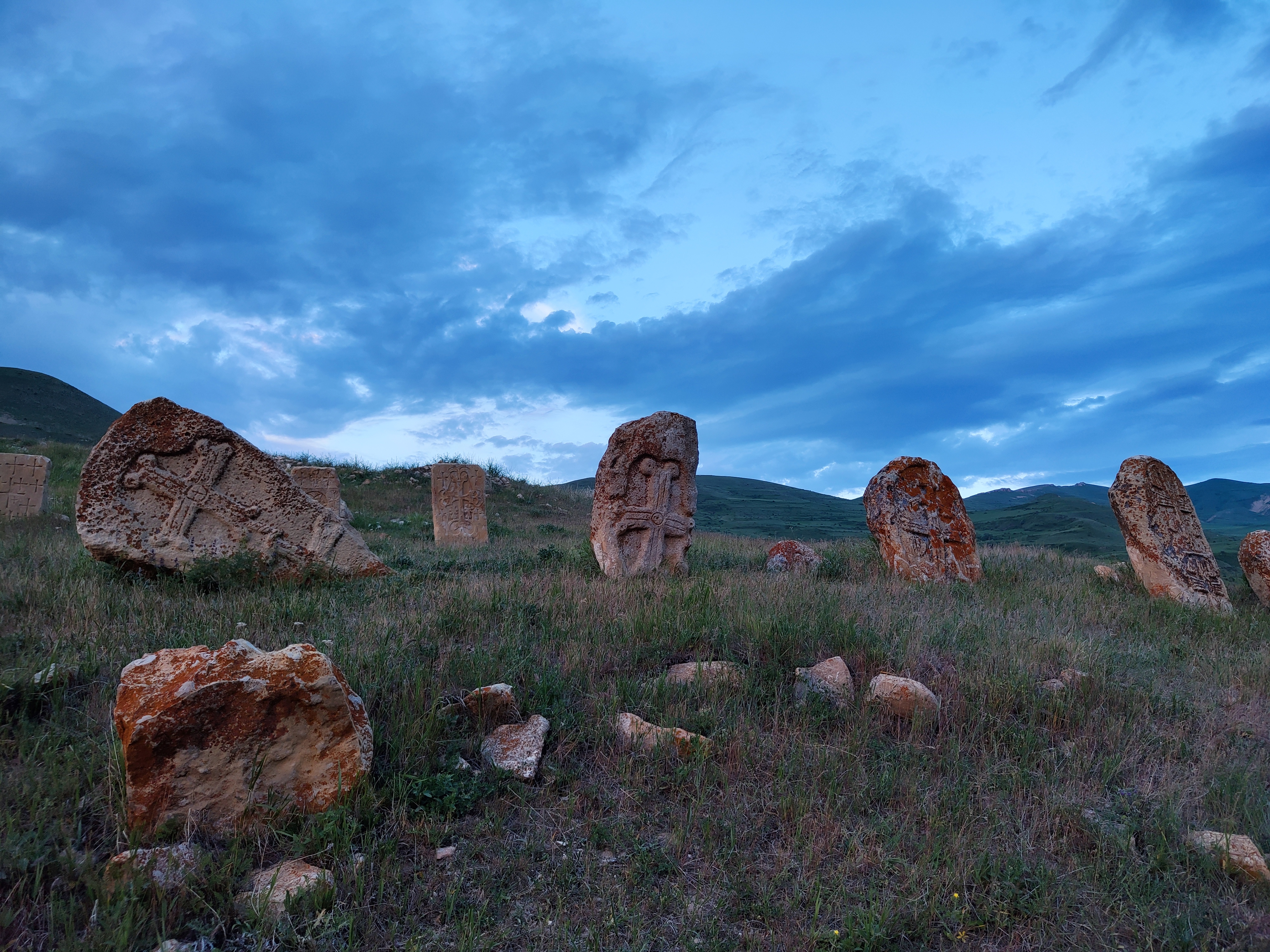
Khachkars

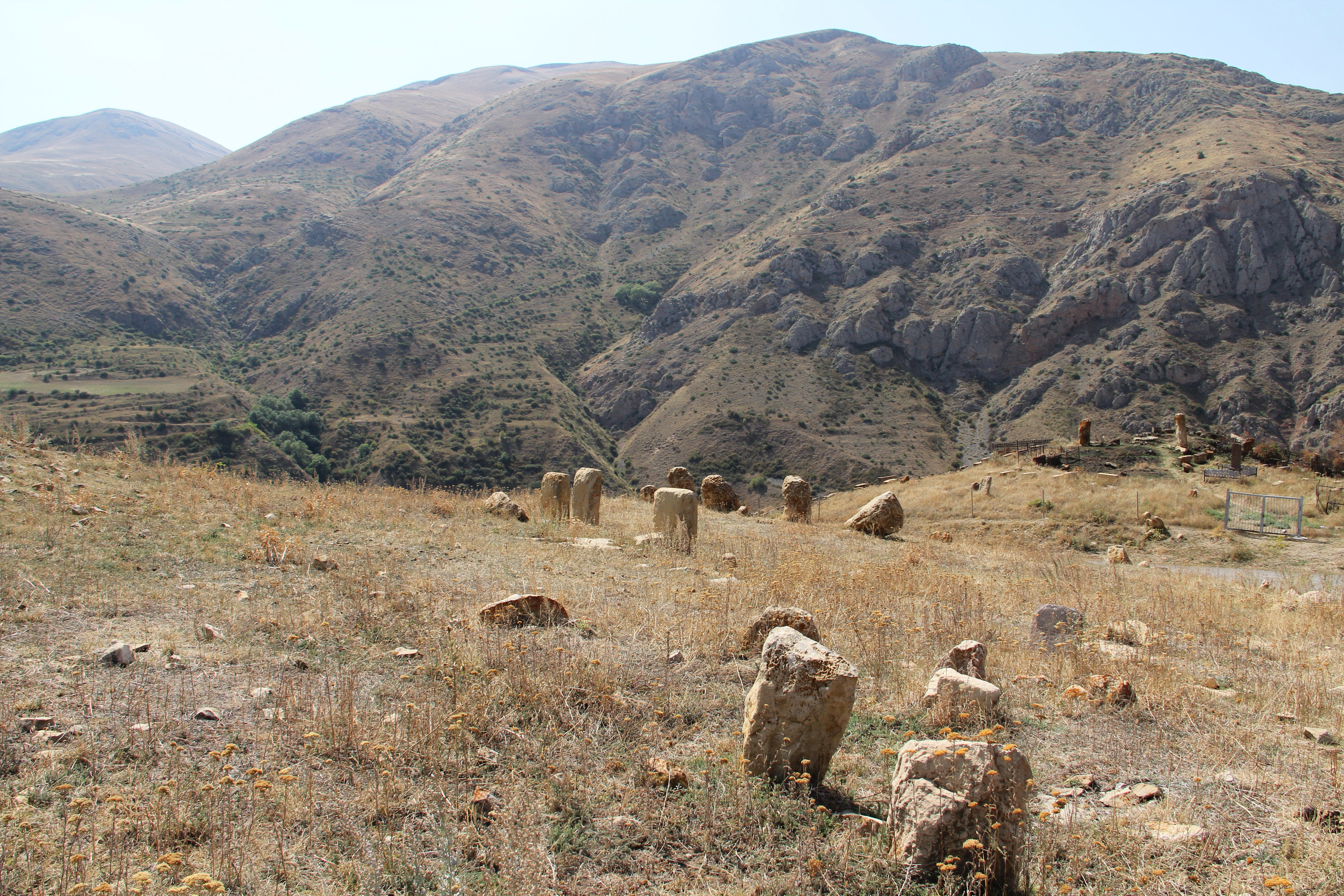

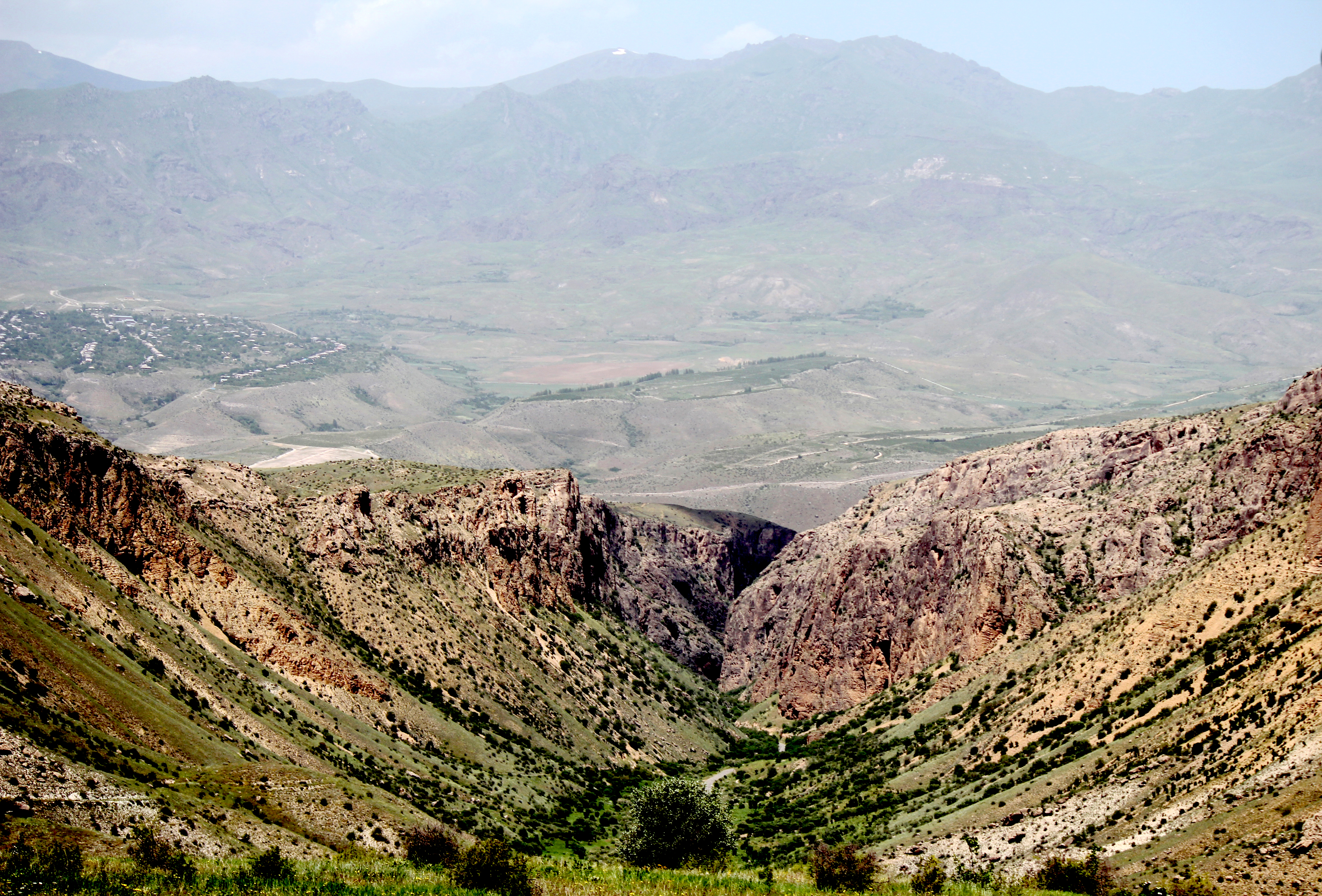

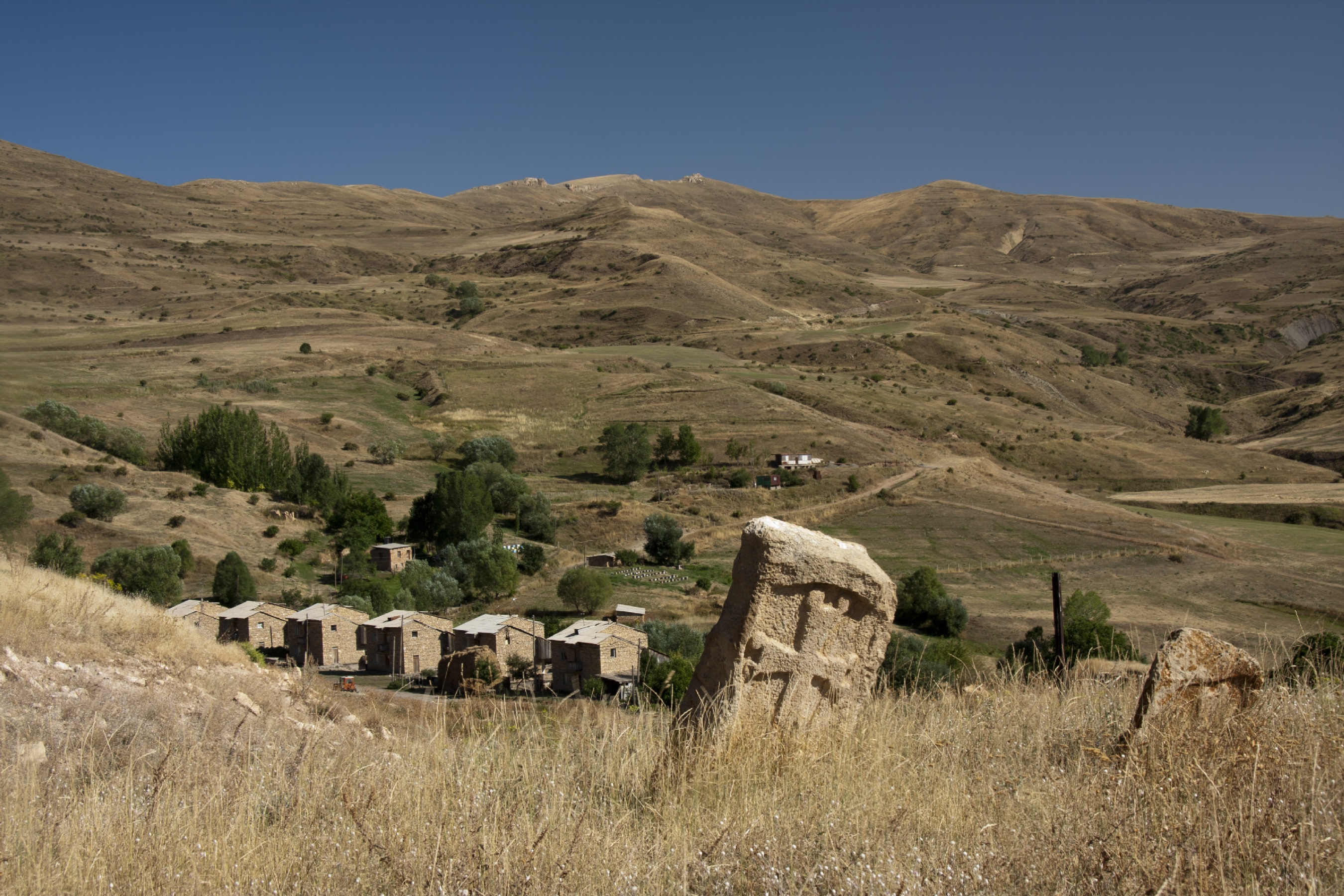
