= Evgeny Aramovich Abramyan =

Russian physicist (1930–2014)

Evgeny Abramyan
- Եվգենի Աբրամյան
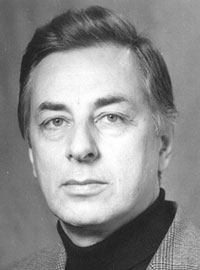
- Born: August 3, 1930; Tbilisi, Georgia
- Died: December 23, 2014 (aged 84); Moscow, Russia
- Awards: USSR State Prize, Order of the Badge of Honor
- Scientific career
- Fields: Physics

Evgeny Aramovich Abramyan (Russian: Евге́ний Ара́мович Абрамя́н; August 3, 1930 – December 23, 2014) was a Soviet-Armenian physicist, Professor, Doctor of Engineering Sciences, Winner of USSR State Prize, one of the founders of several research directions in the Soviet and Russian nuclear technology. Author of more than 100 inventions and several books on applied physics, Evgeny Abramyan led research teams at the Kurchatov Institute of Atomic Energy, Budker Institute of Nuclear Physics, and the Institute of High Temperatures of USSR Academy of Sciences. In the 1960s he supervised the creation of a new research discipline – engineering physics – at the Novosibirsk State Technical University, chaired the university's major faculty. In later years, Evgeny Abramyan published a number of works on political science and globalistics.

== Biography ==
Evgeny Abramyan was born in Tbilisi in 1930. In 1947 he graduated from the school with a gold medal and enrolled to study in the Bauman Moscow State Technical University (now renamed as State Technical University); Rocketry Department and Engineering Physics Department. At 4th course he received Stalin's scholarship.

In 1951 — transferred to the Moscow Engineering Physics Institute (then called Moscow Institute of Mechanics) and graduated in 1953.

1953-1958 — worked at the Kurchatov Institute of Atomic Energy.

1952-1957 — during summertime worked as mountain climbing instructor in the Caucasus.

1958-1972 — headed a laboratory at the Institute of Nuclear Physics of the Siberian Branch of the Russian Academy of Sciences (Novosibirsk), emerged among the founders of the institute.

1962-1971 — supervised the creation of the new research discipline "engineering physics" at the Novosibirsk State Technical University (NSTU), from May 1966 to February 1972 Evgeny Abramyan headed the Department of Electrophysical Installations and Accelerators and emerged among the founders of the university's Engineering Physics Department.

1972-1993 — headed a department at the Institute of High Temperatures of the Russian Academy of Sciences (Moscow) where he formed a new research team to study high-intensity electron beams.

== Publications ==
Evgeny Abramyan is the author of more than 90 scientific articles and 100 inventions. His major works address strong current electron beams, recuperation of the energy of charged particle beams, industrial accelerators, high intensity radiation generators, high-voltage transformers as well as the issues of political science, globalization and futurology.

- Е.А. Abramyan, G.I. Budker, G.V. Glagolev, A.A. Naumov: Betatron With Spiral Accumulation of Electrons // Journal of Technical Physics, 1965, Vol. 35, No. 4. (In Russian)
- E.A. Abramyan, On Possibilities of Transformer Type Accelerators // Nucl. Instrum. and Methods. 1968. Vol.59, №1.P.22-28
- Е.А. Abramyan, S.B. Vasserman, V.A. Tsukerman et al.: Short Pulse High Intensity Hard X-Ray Generator // Proceedings of the Russian Academy of Sciences, 1970, Vol. 192, No. 1. (In Russian)
- E.A. Abramyan, The Generation of Intensive Relativistic Electron Beams // The Gordon Conference on Plasma Physics, Seattle, June 1970, USA
- Е.А. Abramyan, A.N. Sharapa: Experiments on the Electron Beam Energy Recuperation // Laboratory Equipment and Techniques, 1971, No. 2. (In Russian)
- E.A. Abramyan, V.A.Gaponov. An Electron Tube, Patent №387667 (England), 1972
- E.A. Abramyan, High-Voltage Pulse Generators of the Base of the Shock Transformer // Pulsed Power Conf. Lubbocк, USA, nov. 1976
- E.A. Abramyan, B.A. Alterkop, G.D. Kuleshov. Report on the 2nd Intern. Topic. Conf. on High Power Electron and Ion Beam Res. and Technology. Ithaca, USA, Oct., 1977
- E.A. Abramyan, Industrial Electron Accelerators. Atomic Energy Review, vol.16, №3, 1978
- E.A. Abramyan, E.E.Finkel. Electron Beam in Cable Engineering // Trans. 2nd Intern. Meet. Rad. Proc. Miaimi, 1978
- Е.А. Abramyan, B.A. Alterkop, G.D. Kuleshov: Energy Transmission in Electron Beam: Problems and Prospects // Electricity Journal, 1983, No. 7. (In Russian)
- Е.А. Abramyan, B.A. Alterkop, G.D. Kuleshov: High Intensity Electron Beams: Physics, Engineering, Applications, М.: Energoatomizdat, 1984. — 231 с. (In Russian)
- Е.А. Abramyan: Industrial Electron Accelerators and Applications. — М.: Energoatomizdat, 1986. — 250 p. (In Russian)
- E.A. Abramyan: Industrial Electron Accelerators and Applications. — New York: Hemisphere Publishing Corp., 1988. — 302 p. (In English)
- Е.А. Abramyan: How Long Are We Expected to Live? Analysis of the World Situation and Prospects for the Future. — М.: Terika, 2006. — 536 p. (In Russian)
- Е.А. Abramyan: The Destiny of Civilization. What Awaits Us in the 21st Century. — М.: Terika, 2007. — 554 p. (In Russian)
- Е.А. Abramyan: Civilization in the 21st Century. Analysis of the World Situation and Prospects for the Future. — М.: Terika, 2008. — 555 p. (In Russian)
- E.A. Abramyan: Civilization in the 21st Century. Analysis of the World Situation and Prospects for the Future. — in print. (In English)
