= Atossa Araxia Abrahamian =

American journalist

- Born: July 19, 1986 (age 39); Vancouver, British Columbia, Canada
- Education: Columbia University (BA)
- Occupation: Journalist

Atossa Araxia Abrahamian (Persian: آتوسا آبراهامیان) is a New York-based journalist and a former senior editor of The Nation. Abrahamian is the author of the 2015 non-fiction book The Cosmopolites: The Coming of the Global Citizen.

== Life and career ==
Abrahamian was born in Canada and grew up in Switzerland. Her parents, who are Iranians of Armenian and Russian descent, worked for the United Nations. She holds United States, Swiss, Canadian, and Iranian citizenship and speaks English, French, and Russian.

Abrahamian is an alumna of the International School of Geneva. She earned an undergraduate degree in philosophy from Columbia College in 2008. She then earned her master's degree at the Columbia University Graduate School of Journalism.

She began her career as a business journalist for Thomson Reuters. Abrahamian later served as editor for the magazine The New Inquiry and Dissent. She also worked as an opinion editor for Al Jazeera America. From 2018, she was a senior editor of The Nation. Her work has appeared in The Atlantic and The New Yorker.

== Works ==
- Abrahamian, Atossa Araxia (2015). The Cosmopolites. New York: Columbia Global Reports. ISBN 978-0-9909763-6-3.
- Abrahamian, Atossa Araxia (2024-10-08). The Hidden Globe. New York: Penguin. ISBN 978-0-593-32985-6.
