= Abu Ghosh Vocal Music Festival =

Biannual festival in Israel

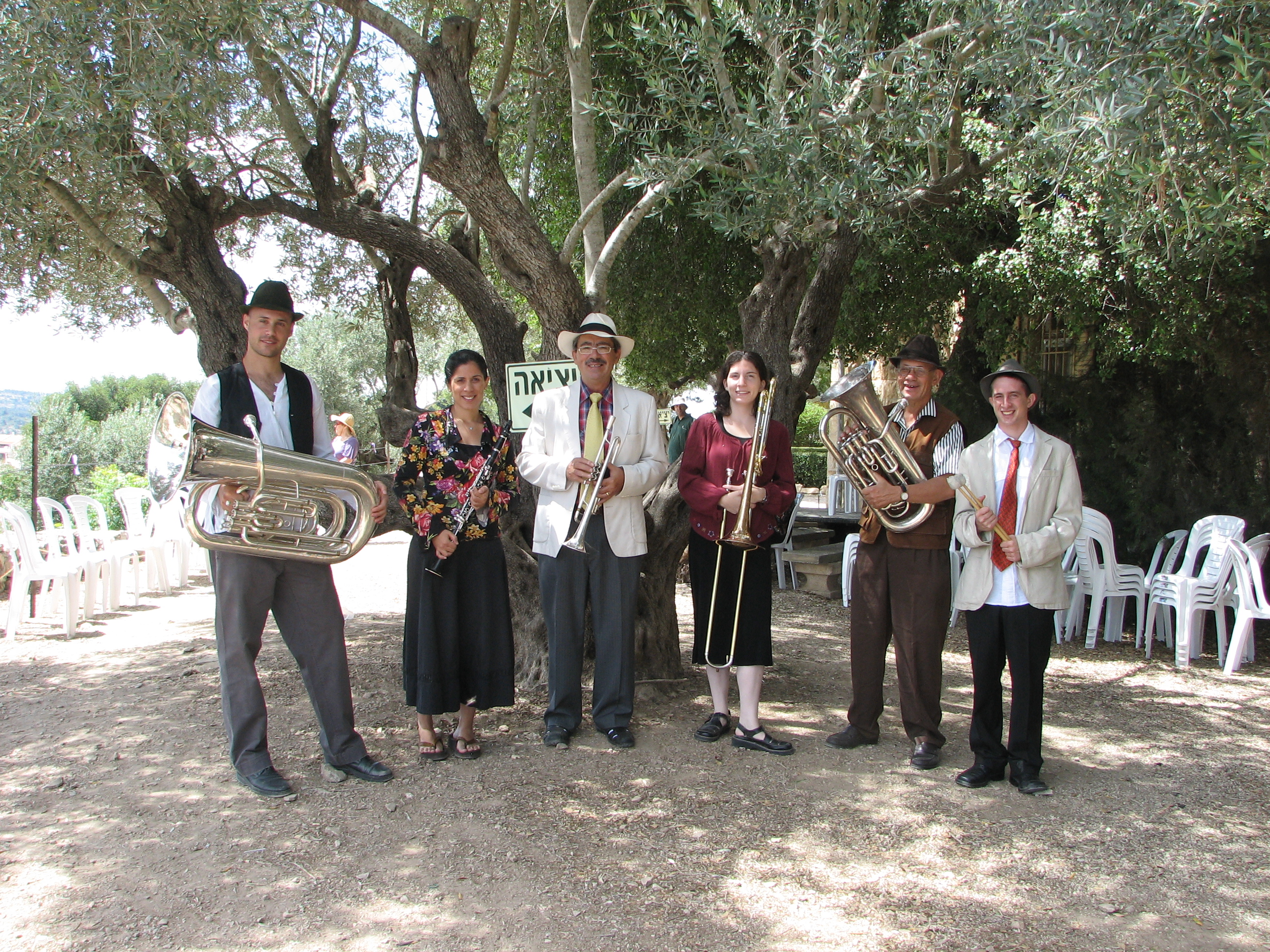
Abu Ghosh Vocal Music Festival, May 2010

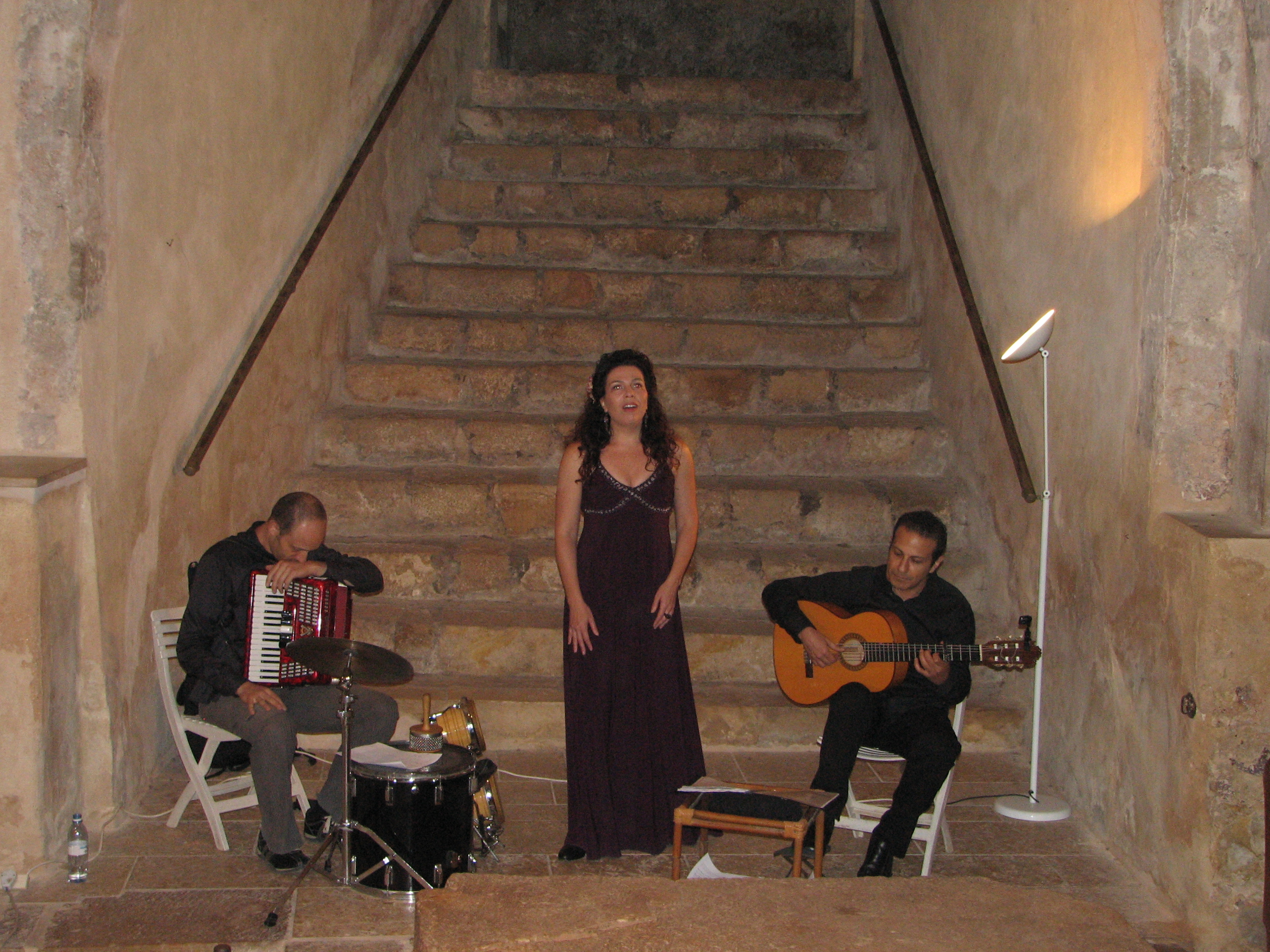
Irit Shterk during the Abu Ghosh Vocal Music Festival in May 2010, at the Benedictine monastery in Abu Ghosh

Abu Ghosh Vocal Music Festival (Hebrew: פסטיבל אבו גוש, romanized: Festival Abu Ghosh) is a vocal music festival that takes place semiannually during the Jewish holidays of Sukkot and Shavuot, at Our Lady of the Ark of the Covenant Church in Abu Ghosh, Israel.

== History ==
The music festival was inaugurated in 1957 by pharmacology professor, Felix Zolmann, and pianist and conductor Zigi Shtaderman, following the discovery of the excellent acoustics of the hilltop church in Abu Ghosh. Musicians and choir singers came from all over Israel and foreign countries, and the church hosted the festival free of charge. Since 1992, the festival has been organized by the Association for the Promotion of Music and Culture in Abu Ghosh and the Judean Mountains.
