= Edgar Hovhannisyan =

Armenian composer

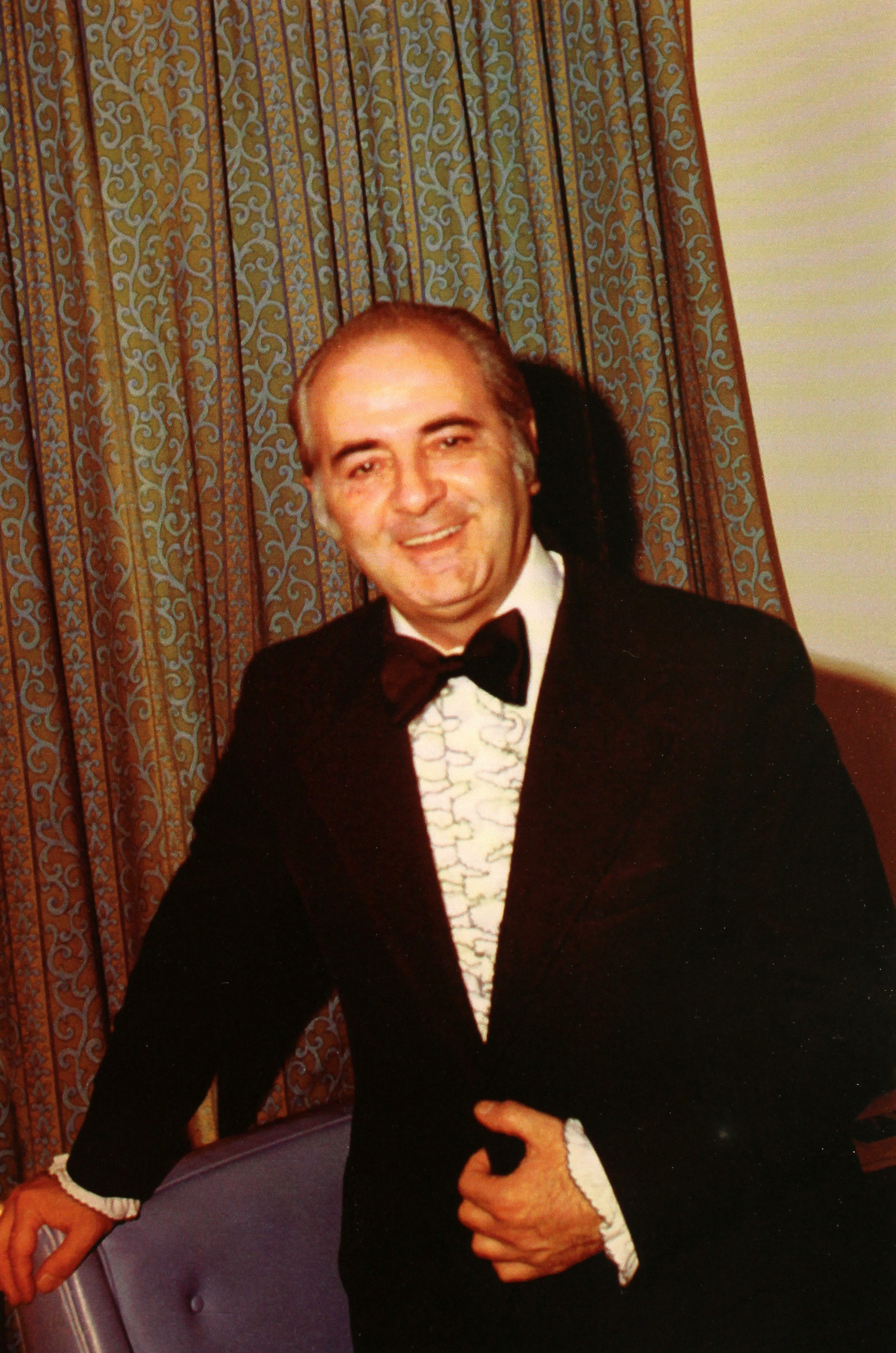
Edgar Hovhannisyan

Edgar Hovhannisyan, Hovhannisian or Oganesian (Armenian: Էդգար Հովհաննիսյան,Russian: Эдгар Сергеевич Оганесян; January 14, 1930 – December 28, 1998) was an Armenian composer, Professor of Composition at the Yerevan State Conservatory, People's Artist of the USSR (1986).

He graduated from the Yerevan State Conservatory in 1953, then pursued post-graduate work at the Moscow Conservatory, where he worked under famed Armenian composer Aram Khachaturian. He was the director of the State Opera and Ballet Theater in Yerevan from 1962 to 1968, and Deputy Chairman of the Board of the Union of Composers of the Armenian SSR from 1956 to 1973. He was the rector of the Yerevan State Conservatory from 1986 to 1991.

Hovhannisyan is widely considered among the most influential Armenian composers of the 20th century. He is the author of ballets, including Joan of Arc, Sulamif (Shulamith) and Marmar. He experimented with various musical styles, including neo-classical, folk-based styles, and even jazz — such as in the Concert Variations for Saxophone and Jazz Orchestra — opera (Journey to Arzrum), various vocal-orchestral works (e.g. the oratorio Grigor Narekatsi, the hymn of Yerevan), and numerous film scores.

== Awards ==
- State Prize of the USSR (1979)
- State Prize of Armenian SSR (1967)
- People's Artist of the Armenian SSR (1972)
- People's Artist of the USSR (1986)
- Honorary citizenship of Yerevan (1998)

== Works ==
Ballets:

- Marmar (1957)
- Blue Nocturne (1964)
- Eternal Idol (1966)
- Antuni (ballet-oratorio, 1969)
- David of Sasun (opera-ballet, 1976)
- Masquerade (to music by Aram Khachaturian, 1982)
- Joan of Arc
- Shulamith

Opera:

- Journey to Arzrum (after Pushkin, 1987)

Cantatas and oratorios:

- Peace to the world! (1950)
- Native country (1960)
- Erebuni (on ancient cuneiform texts, 1968)
- In the Armenian mountains (1969)
- Monument to the Heroes (choreographic, 1975)
- Glory to Lenin's Party (1977)
- Grigor Narekatsi (oratorio, 1995)

For orchestra:

- Ballet Suite (1953)
- Symphony No.1 (1958)
- Concert Variations for saxophone & jazz orchestra (1965)
- Chamber Concerto (1968)
- Symphony No.2 (1983)
- Baroque Concerto (1983)
- Symphony No.3 (1984)
- Symphonic poem Golgotha (1993)

"Chamber music:"

- Nocturne for cello & piano (1947)
- String Quartet No.1 (1950)
- Piano Quintet (1955)
- String Quartet No.2 (1958)
- String Quartet No.3 (1964)
- Sonata for solo cello (1969)
- cello sonata Epitaph (1975)
- Rondo-Sonata for cello & piano (1977)
- String Quartet No.4 (1981)

Choral music:

- The Communist Party (1952)
- Two shores (1952)
- Vitosha-Ararat (1967)
- Sardarapat (1968)
- Arpa-Sevan (1969)
- Rest (1969)

Additionally, many songs, arrangements of Armenian folk songs and dances, incidental music, piano pieces etc.

== Filmography ==
- 1956 – For Honor (Patvi hamar)
- 1960 – Northern Rainbow
- 1960 – Sponge Catchers
- 1960 – Born to Live
- 1961 – The Road
- 1961 – Night Passenger
- 1965 – Extraordinary assignment
- 1966 – Avdo's car (within the documentary People of our city)
- 1968 – There lived a man (Aprum er mi mard)
- 1969 – Explosion after midnight
- 1970 – Shot on the border "
- 1972 – Armenian frescoes
- 1973 – The last feat of Kamo
- 1978 – Star of Hope (Huso astgh)
- 1993 – Catastrophe (jointly with Yuri Harutyunyan).

== Sources ==
- Biography
- Biography (in Russian)
- Brief worklist (in Russian)
- Edgar Hovhannisyan at IMDb
- Shakhnazarova N., The composer in the context of national culture (about Edgar Oganesyan), "Soviet Music", 1987, No. 5.
