= Rouben Abrahamian =

Armenian linguist (1881–1951)

- Born: 1881; Gnishik, Erivan Governorate, Russian Empire (now Armenia)
- Died: 1951 (aged 69–70); Yerevan, Armenian SSR, Soviet Union (now Armenia)
- Scientific career
- Fields: Iranian studies, linguistics

Rouben Abrahamian (Armenian: Ռուբեն Աբրահամյան; 1881 – 1951) was an Armenian Iranologist, linguist and translator. Born in the Russian empire, he later moved to Tehran, where he served as the principal of an Armenian school and studied Persian. He wrote his thesis on dialects of Judeo-Persian. He is best known for his translation from Pahlavi to Armenian.

== Biography ==
Rouben Abrahamian was born in 1881 in the village of Gnishik (modern-day Vayots Dzor Province of Armenia), then part of the Russian Empire. He received his secondary education in Etchmiadzin and Yerevan, and then moved abroad for higher education in a number of places. First, he studied at the Faculty of History and Philology at the Kiev University (1907), then at Leipzig University (1909), and then at the Saint Petersburg Imperial University (1911). After his academic spell in Europe, he returned and started teaching Russian, linguistics, and classical philosophy in Yerevan. Between 1912 and 1921, he taught in Tiflis (Tbilisi), as well as at other schools in the Caucasus region. In 1921, he moved to neighboring Iran and taught for many years at various Armenian schools in Tabriz, New Julfa, and Tehran.

During his time in Tehran, Abrahamian served as the principal of a large Armenian school. At the same time, he also began his study of ancient and modern Persian. Some time later, he once again travelled to Europe for educational matters, and in 1935, he received his doctorate in philology from the Sorbonne University in Paris (nowadays University of Paris). He wrote his graduation thesis on the Judeo-Persian dialects of Judeo-Isfahani and Judeo-Hamadani. His interest for this topic stemmed from the time he translated the works of the 11th-century Iranian poet Baba Tahir into Armenian. Abrahamian's work on this matter was pivotal, for he found important commonalities between the language used in Baba Tahir’s poems and the Jewish dialects of the Iranian cities of Hamadān and Isfahan. His findings on behalf of Baba Tahir and the Jewish dialects were published in the following year under the title of Dialectologie iranienne: dialectes des Israélites de Hamadan et d’Ispahan et dialecte de Baba Tahir.

When the University of Tehran was founded in 1935, Abrahamian participated actively in the establishment of its department of Ancient Iranian Languages, where he subsequently started teaching Middle Persian (Pahlavi) and became head of the faculty as well. In 1946, following the Iran crisis of 1946, he moved to Soviet Armenia, where he worked at the Institute of Languages at the Academy of Sciences in Yerevan.

== Publications ==
- Kʻareakner ew ḡazalner: Baba Tʻahir Orian Hamadani (The quatrains and ḡazals of Bābā Ṭāher ʿOryān Hamadāni), Tehran, 1930.
- Ferdovsin ew ir Šahnamēn (Ferdowsi and his Shahnameh), Tehran, 1934.
- Hatuatsner Šahnameits (Excerpts from the Shahnameh), Tehran, 1934.
- Dialectologie iranienne : dialectes des Israélites de Hamadan et d’Ispahan et dialecte de Baba Tahir, Paris, 1936.
- Alefbā-ye pahlavi, Tehran, 1937.
- Rāhnemā-ye zabān-e pahlavi, Tehran, 1938.
- Sayatʻ-Novayi tagherě (The Verses of Sayat Nova), Tehran, 1943.
- Ardā Wīrāz-nāmag, Yerevan, 1958.
- Pahlaveren-parskeren-hayeren-ṛuseren-angleren baṛaran (Pahlavi-Persian-Armenian-Russian-English dictionary), Yerevan, 1965.

== Sources ==
- Manoukian, Jennifer. "ABRAHAMIAN, ROUBEN". Encyclopaedia Iranica.
- H. M. Ayvazean, Ov ov ē hayer: Kensagrakan hanragitaran (Who is Who among Armenians: Biographical encyclopedia), Yerevan, 2005, p. 22.
- B. L Chʻugaszean, Hayrenatardz iranahay dēmkʻer (Repatriated Iranian-Armenians), Yerevan, 1997, pp. 11–12.
